= 2026 Missouri State Senate election =

2026 Missouri Senate election
- November 3, 2026

17 even-numbered districts in the Missouri Senate 18 seats needed for a majority
	Majority party	Minority party
Leader	Cindy O'Laughlin (term limited)	Doug Beck
Party	Republican	Democratic
Leader since	January 8, 2025	June 30, 2024
Leader's seat	18th - Shelbina	1st - Affton
Seats before	24	10
Seats after	22	12
Seat change	▼2	▲2
- Map of the incumbents: Republican retiring or term-limited Republican incumbent Democrat retiring or term-limited Democratic incumbent No election
President pro tempore before election
Cindy O'Laughlin
Republican
Elected President pro tempore
TBD

The 2026 Missouri Senate election took place on Tuesday, November 3, 2026, with the primary election are to take place on Tuesday, August 4, 2026. Missouri voters selected state senators in the 17 even-numbered districts of the Senate to serve four-year terms. Missouri voters selected state senators in the 17 even-numbered districts of the Senate to serve four-year terms.

The election coincided with United States national elections and Missouri state elections, including U.S. House, auditor, and Missouri House.

Following the previous election in 2024, Republicans held a 24-to-10-seat supermajority over Democrats. The Missouri Democrats defeated the Republican Supermajority by flipping Senate Seats 8 and 30 to the Democrats.

== Retirements ==
=== Democratic ===
- District 4: Karla May is term-limited.
- District 14: Brian Williams is term-limited.

=== Republican ===
- District 6: Mike Bernskoetter is term-limited.
- District 8: Mike Cierpiot is term-limited.
- District 10: Travis Fitzwater is retiring.
- District 16: Justin Brown is term-limited.
- District 18: Cindy O'Laughlin is term-limited.
- District 22: Mary Elizabeth Coleman is retiring.
- District 28: Sandy Crawford is term-limited.
- District 30: Lincoln Hough is term-limited.
- District 34: Tony Luetkemeyer is term-limited.

== Predictions ==
Source	Ranking	As of
Sabato's Crystal Ball	Likely R	January 22, 2026
State Navigate	Safe R	October 23, 2026

== Summary of results by Senate district ==
Italics denote an open seat held by the incumbent party; bold text denotes a gain for a party.

District	2024 pres.	Incumbent	Party	Elected senator	Party
2	R+23.30	Nick Schroer	Rep	Nick Shroer	Rep
4	D+49.58	Karla May†	Dem	Gina Mitten	Dem
6	R+48.91	Mike Bernskoetter†	Rep	Jake Vogel	Rep
8	R+5.20	Mike Cierpiot†	Rep	**Keri Ingle**	**Dem**
10	R+46.44	Travis Fitzwater†	Rep	Mike Deering	Rep
12	R+57.04	Rusty Black	Rep	Rusty Black	Rep
14	D+52.64	Brian Williams†	Dem	Raychel Proudie	Dem
16	R+58.40	Justin Brown†	Rep	Bill Hardwick	Rep
18	R+53.83	Cindy O'Laughlin†	Rep	Greg Sharpe	Rep
20	R+48.05	Curtis Trent	Rep	Lori Rook	Rep
22	R+33.48	Mary Elizabeth Coleman†	Rep	Jim Avery	Rep
24	D+13.72	Tracy McCreery	Dem	Tracy McCreery	Dem
26	R+48.24	Ben Brown	Rep	Ben Brown	Rep
28	R+58.17	Sandy Crawford†	Rep	Sam Alexander	Rep
30	R+2.50	Lincoln Hough†	Rep	**Betsy Fogle**	**Dem**
32	R+50.89	Jill Carter	Rep	Jill Carter	Rep
34	R+11.06	Tony Luetkemeyer†	Rep	Mike Jones	Rep

† - Incumbent term-limited or retiring

== District 2 ==
The 2nd district encompasses south central St. Charles County and includes O'Fallon, Lake St. Louis, Dardenne Prairie and Cottleville. The incumbent is Republican Nick Schroer.

Estimated Partisan Voting Index	R+13

2nd District Republican primary details

=== Candidates ===
- Nick Schroer, incumbent senator

2nd District Democratic primary details

=== Candidates ===
- Susan Shumway, chaplain

== District 4 ==
The 4th district is split between southwestern St. Louis, including St. Louis Hills, North Hampton and Cheltenham, and St. Louis County, including Richmond Heights, Brentwood, Maplewood and part of Shrewsbury. The incumbent is Democrat Karla May, who is term-limited.

Estimated Partisan Voting Index	D+24

4th District Democratic primary details

=== Candidates ===
- Steve Butz, state representative of District 81
- Peter Merideth, former state representative of District 80
- Gina Mitten, former state representative of District 83

Withdrew

- Chris Clark, attorney

Endorsements

Steve Butz

Labor unions

- IAFF Local 73 & 2665
Gina Mitten

Labor unions

- Missouri-Kansas-Nebraska Conference of Teamsters

== District 6 ==
The 6th district is made up of Cole, Camden, Miller, Morgan and Moniteau counties, and includes the state capital of Jefferson City. The incumbent is Republican Mike Bernskoetter, who is term-limited.

Estimated Partisan Voting Index	R+25

6th District Republican primary details

=== Candidates ===
- Amber Buckles
- Isaac Skelton, Camden County commissioner
- Derrick Spicer, sales director and former Jefferson City councilman (2021–2025)
- Lisa Thomas, former state representative
- Rudy Veit, state representative of District 59
- Jake Vogel, former U.S. Army ranger and son of former state senator Carl Vogel

Declined

- Chuck Gatschenberger, former state representative (2009–2015)

Polling

Poll source	Date(s) administered	Sample size (Note: Key: A – all adults RV – registered voters LV – likely voters V – unclear)	Margin of error	Amber Buckles	Isaac Skelton	Derrick Spicer	Lisa Thomas	Rudy Veit	Jake Vogel	Undecided
Remington Research Group (R) (Note: Poll sponsored by the Missouri Scout)	July 14–16, 2026	315 (LV)	± 5.4%	4%	8%	12%	8%	20%	23%	25%

== District 8 ==
The 8th district is composed of southeastern Jackson County, including Lee's Summit, Blue Springs and Greenwood. The incumbent is Republican Mike Cierpiot, who is term-limited.

Estimated Partisan Voting Index	R+4

8th District Republican primary details

=== Candidates ===
- Jonathan Patterson, state representative and speaker of the Missouri House
- Dan Stacy, former state representative of District 31

Polling

Poll source	Date(s) administered	Sample size	Margin of error	Jonathan Patterson	Dan Stacy	Undecided
Remington Research Group (R)	July 14–16, 2026	303 (LV)	± 5.4%	34%	11%	55%
Remington Research Group (R)	June 9–12, 2026	–	± 4.9%	27%	13%	60%

8th District Democratic primary details

=== Candidates ===
- Keri Ingle, state representative of District 35

Polling

Poll source	Date(s) administered	Sample size	Margin of error	Jon Patterson (R)	Keri Ingle (D)	Undecided
Remington Research Group (R)	September 30 – October 1, 2026	596 (LV)	± 4.0%	45%	48%	7%

== District 10 ==
The 10th district is made up of Lincoln, Callaway, Pike and Montgomery counties, and northwestern St. Charles County. The incumbent is Republican Travis Fitzwater, who is retiring.

Estimated Partisan Voting Index	R+24

10th District Republican primary details

=== Candidates ===
- Tricia Byrnes, state representative
- Mike Deering, Missouri Cattlemen’s Association executive vice president

Declined

- Mike Carter, Wentzville municipal judge, candidate for this seat in 2022 and for secretary of state in 2024 (endorsed Byrnes)
- Travis Fitzwater, incumbent senator
- Doyle Justus, state representative
- Chad Perkins, speaker pro tempore of the Missouri House of Representatives
- Jim Schulte, state representative

Polling

Poll source	Date(s) administered	Sample size	Margin of error	Tricia Byrnes	Mike Deering	Undecided
Remington Research Group (R)	July 15–17, 2026	309 (LV)	± 5.4%	29%	33%	38%

== District 12 ==
The 12th district is located in northwestern Missouri and includes Nodaway, Clinton, Andrew, Livingston, Linn, DeKalb, Grundy, Caldwell, Carroll, Daviess, Harrison, Chariton, Gentry, Sullivan, Atchison, Holt, Mercer and Worth counties, as well as northeastern Buchanan County. The incumbent is Republican Rusty Black.

Estimated Partisan Voting Index	R+29

12th District Republican primary details

=== Candidates ===
- Rusty Black, incumbent senator
- Freddie Griffin Jr., heavy equipment operator and candidate for Missouri's 6th congressional district in 2024

== District 14 ==
The 14th district is based in northern St. Louis County and includes University City, Hazelwood, Ferguson and Overland. The incumbent is Democrat Brian Williams, who is term-limited.

Estimated Partisan Voting Index	D+27

14th District Democratic primary details

=== Candidates ===
- John Bowman, president of the St. Louis County NAACP and former state representative
- Shante Duncan, consultant
- Joe Palm, former Biden administration aide
- Raychel Proudie, state representative

Withdrew

- Doug Clemens, state representative (running for St. Louis County assessor)

Polling

Poll source	Date(s) administered	Sample size	Margin of error	John Bowman	Shante Duncan	Joe Palm	Raychel Proudie	Undecided
Remington Research Group (R)	July 14–17, 2026	313 (LV)	± 5.34%	8%	4%	3%	25%	60%

== District 16 ==
The 16th district encompasses south-central Missouri and includes Pulaski, Phelps, Laclede, Wright, Dent and Maries counties. The incumbent is Republican Justin Brown, who is term-limited.

Estimated Partisan Voting Index	R+30

16th District Republican primary details

=== Candidates ===
- Bill Hardwick, state representative of District 121
- Hannah Kelly, former state representative of District 141 (2017–2025)
- Jeff Knight, representative of Missouri House District 142
- Philip Lohmann, returning candidate
- Don Mayhew, state representative of District 124

Withdrew

- Joseph Steelman, businessman and son of David and Sarah Steelman

Polling

Poll source	Date(s) administered	Sample size	Margin of error	Bill Hardwick	Hannah Kelly	Philip Lohmann	Don Mayhew	Undecided
Remington Research Group (R)	July 17–20, 2026	304 (LV)	± 5.4%	30%	23%	1%	19%	27%

== District 18 ==
The 18th district is located in northeastern Missouri and includes Marion, Adair, Audrain, Randolph, Macon, Ralls, Lewis, Monroe, Clark, Shelby, Scotland, Putnam, Schuyler and Knox counties. The incumbent is Republican Cindy O'Laughlin, who is term-limited.

Estimated Partisan Voting Index	R+27

18th District Republican primary details

=== Candidates ===
- Dustin Blue, businessowner and Army veteran
- Ed Lewis, state representative
- Greg Sharpe, state representative of District 4

Withdrew

- Sarah Graff, Moberly city councilwoman and staff member of Congressman Sam Graves

Declined

- Louis Riggs, state representative

Endorsements

Sarah Graff (withdrew)

State legislators

- ~~Cindy O'Laughlin, incumbent state senator~~
Ed Lewis

State legislators

- Cindy O'Laughlin, incumbent state senator

Polling

Poll source	Date(s) administered	Sample size	Margin of error	Dustin Blue	Ed Lewis	Greg Sharpe	Undecided
Remington Research Group (R)	July 17–20, 2026	296 (LV)	± 5.4%	28%	21%	26%	25%

== District 20 ==
The 20th district is based in southwestern Missouri and includes Webster, Barton and Dade counties, as well as Greene County, excluding Springfield. The incumbent is Republican Curtis Trent.

Estimated Partisan Voting Index	R+25

20th District Republican primary details

=== Candidates ===
- Lori Rook, attorney and candidate for state treasurer in 2024
- Curtis Trent, incumbent senator

Declined

- Ann Kelley, state representative

Polling

Poll source	Date(s) administered	Sample size	Margin of error	Lori Rook	Curtis Trent	Undecided
Remington Research Group (R)	July 17–19, 2026	301 (LV)	± 5.4%	39%	35%	26%

20th District Democratic primary details
- Sean Falconer, medical instructor

== District 22 ==
The 22nd district encompasses northern Jefferson County and includes Arnold, Festus, De Soto, Pevely and Herculaneum. The incumbent is Republican Mary Elizabeth Coleman, who is retiring.

Estimated Partisan Voting Index	R+17

22nd District Republican primary details

=== Candidates ===
- Jim Avery, former state representative
- David Robertson, retired college professor

Withdrew

- David Casteel, state representative (running for re-election)
- Renee Reuter, state representative (running for Jefferson County associate judge)

Deceased

- Ken Waller, state representative

22nd District Democratic primary details

=== Candidates ===
- Jeff Abney, attorney

== District 24 ==
The 24th district is located in central St. Louis County and includes Kirkwood, Maryland Heights, Creve Coeur and Des Peres. The incumbent is Democrat Tracy McCreery.

Estimated Partisan Voting Index	D+6

24th District Democratic primary details

=== Candidates ===
- Tracy McCreery, incumbent senator

== District 26 ==
The 26th district is made up of several counties west of the Greater St. Louis metropolitan area, including Franklin, Warren, Gasconade and Osage counties, as well as a small portion of western St. Louis County. The incumbent is Republican Ben Brown.

Estimated Partisan Voting Index	R+25

26th District Republican primary details

=== Candidates ===
- Ben Brown, incumbent senator

26th District Democratic primary details

=== Candidates ===
- Victoria Taylor Wors, retired human resources manager

== District 28 ==
The 28th district is based in western Missouri and includes Pettis, Polk, Henry, Vernon, Benton, Dallas, Cedar, St. Clair and Hickory counties. The incumbent is Republican Sandy Crawford, who is term-limited.

Estimated Partisan Voting Index	R+30

28th District Republican primary details

=== Candidates ===
- Sam Alexander, ER physician and candidate for Missouri's 7th congressional district in 2022
- Chuck Lentz, Southwest Baptist University professor
- Brad Pollitt, state representative of District 52

Endorsements

Brad Pollitt

State legislators

- Sandy Crawford, incumbent state senator

Polling

Poll source	Date(s) administered	Sample size	Margin of error	Sam Alexander	Chuck Lentz	Brad Pollitt	Undecided
Remington Research Group (R)	July 17–19, 2026	304 (LV)	± 5.4%	28%	17%	25%	30%

28th District Democratic primary details

=== Candidates ===
- Mike McCaffree, real estate agent

== District 30 ==
The 30th district consists solely of the city of Springfield. The incumbent is Republican Lincoln Hough, who is term-limited.

Estimated Partisan Voting Index	R+2

30th District Republican primary details

=== Candidates ===
- Melanie Stinnett, state representative of District 133

30th District Democratic primary details

=== Candidates ===
- Betsy Fogle, state representative of District 135

30th District Libertarian primary details

=== Candidates ===
- Cecil Ince, Libertarian activist and perennial candidate

== District 32 ==
The 32nd district is located in southwest Missouri and includes Jasper and Newton counties. The incumbent is Republican Jill Carter.

Estimated Partisan Voting Index	R+26

32nd District Republican primary details

=== Candidates ===
- Jill Carter, incumbent senator
- Ellen Nichols, neurosurgeon

Polling

Poll source	Date(s) administered	Sample size	Margin of error	Jill Carter	Ellen Nichols	Undecided
Remington Research Group (R)	July 19–21, 2026	345 (LV)	± 5.2%	43%	26%	31%

== District 34 ==
The 34th district consists of Platte County and western Buchanan County. The incumbent is Republican Tony Luetkemeyer, who is term-limited.

Estimated Partisan Voting Index	R+6

34th District Republican primary details

=== Candidates ===
- Ryan Gerster, business owner
- Mike Jones, state representative
- Sean Pouche, state representative of District 13

Withdrew

- Brenda Shields, state representative and wife of former state senator Charlie Shields
- Nathan Willett, Kansas City councilman and teacher (running for Congress)

Polling

Poll source	Date(s) administered	Sample size	Margin of error	Ryan Gerster	Mike Jones	Sean Pouche	Undecided
Remington Research Group (R)	July 19–21, 2026	304 (LV)	± 5.4%	3%	36%	10%	51%

34th District Democratic primary details

=== Candidates ===
- Shereka Barnes, codirector of non-profit Kids Win Missouri
- Pam May, retired paralegal

== See also ==
- 2026 United States elections
- 2026 United States House of Representatives elections in Missouri
- 2026 Missouri elections
- 2026 Missouri House of Representatives election
- Missouri General Assembly
- Missouri Senate

== Notes ==
Partisan clients
