= 2022 Missouri Senate election =

- November 8, 2022

17 even-numbered districts in the Missouri Senate 18 seats needed for a majority
	Majority party	Minority party
Leader	Dave Schatz (retired)	John Rizzo
Party	Republican	Democratic
Leader since	January 9, 2019	January 5, 2018
Leader's seat	26th - Sullivan	11th - Independence
Seats before	24	10
Seats after	24	10
Seat change	Steady	Steady
Popular vote	682,007	313,588
Percentage	67.54%	31.05%
- Democratic hold Republican hold No election Republican: 50–60% 60–70% 70–80% 80–90% >90% Democratic: 50–60% 70–80% >90%
President pro tempore before election
Dave Schatz
Republican
Elected President pro tempore
Caleb Rowden
Republican

The 2022 Missouri Senate election took place on Tuesday, November 8, 2022, with the primary election held on Tuesday, August 2, 2022. Missouri voters selected state senators in the 17 even-numbered districts of the Senate to serve four-year terms. The last time that these seats were up for election was the 2018 Missouri Senate election, and the next time that these seats will be up for election will be the 2026 Missouri State Senate election.

The election coincided with United States national elections and Missouri state elections, including U.S. Senate, U.S. House, Auditor, and Missouri House.

Following the previous election in 2020, Republicans held a 24-to-10-seat supermajority over Democrats. The balance of power remained unchanged with Republicans keeping their supermajority of 24-to-10 over Democrats.

These were the first elections in Missouri following the 2020 United States redistricting cycle, which resulted in redrawn legislative district boundaries.

== Predictions ==
Source	Ranking	As of
Sabato's Crystal Ball	Safe R	May 19, 2022

== Retirements ==
- District 2: Bob Onder (R) was succeeded by Nick Schroer (R).
- District 10: Jeanie Riddle (R) was succeeded by Travis Fitzwater (R).
- District 12: Dan Hegeman (R) was succeeded by Rusty Black (R).
- District 20: Eric Burlison (R) was succeeded by Curtis Trent (R).
- District 22: Paul Wieland (R) was succeeded by Mary Elizabeth Coleman (R).
- District 24: Jill Schupp (D) was succeeded by Tracy McCreery (D).
- District 26: Dave Schatz (R) was succeeded by Ben Brown (R).

== Incumbents defeated ==
=== Defeated in primary election ===
- District 32: Bill White (R) was defeated by Jill Carter (R).

== Overview ==
=== Statewide ===
Party	Candi- dates	Votes		Seats		
Party	Candi- dates	No.	%	No.	+/–	%
Republican Party	16	682,007	67.54%	14	Steady	82.35%
Democratic Party	12	313,588	31.05%	3	Steady	17.65%
Libertarian Party	2	14,209	1.41%	0	Steady	0.00%
Write-Ins		24	0.00%	0	Steady	0.00%
Total	30	1,009,828	100.00%	17	Steady	100.00%

=== Close races ===
Districts where the margin of victory was under 10%:

1. District 24, 8.57%

== Summary of results by Senate district ==
Italics denote an open seat held by the incumbent party; bold text denotes a gain for a party.

Senate District	Incumbent	Party	Elected Senator	Party
2	Bob Onder	Rep	Nick Schroer	Rep
4	Karla May	Dem	Karla May	Dem
6	Mike Bernskoetter	Rep	Mike Bernskoetter	Rep
8	Mike Cierpiot	Rep	Mike Cierpiot	Rep
10	Jeanie Riddle	Rep	Travis Fitzwater	Rep
12	Dan Hegeman	Rep	Rusty Black	Rep
14	Brian Williams	Dem	Brian Williams	Dem
16	Justin Brown	Rep	Justin Brown	Rep
18	Cindy O'Laughlin	Rep	Cindy O'Laughlin	Rep
20	Eric Burlison	Rep	Curtis Trent	Rep
22	Paul Wieland	Rep	Mary Elizabeth Coleman	Rep
24	Jill Schupp	Dem	Tracy McCreery	Dem
26	Dave Schatz	Rep	Benjamin "Ben" Brown	Rep
28	Sandy Crawford	Rep	Sandy Crawford	Rep
30	Lincoln Hough	Rep	Lincoln Hough	Rep
32	Bill White	Rep	Jill Carter	Rep
34	Tony Luetkemeyer	Rep	Tony Luetkemeyer	Rep

== Polling ==
=== Primary election polling ===
==== District 2 ====
Poll source	Date(s) administered	Sample size (Note: Key: A – all adults RV – registered voters LV – likely voters V – unclear)	Margin of error	Nick Shroer	John D. Wiemann	Other	Undecided
Remington Research Group (R) (Note: Poll sponsored by the Missouri Scout)	July 19–21, 2022	344 (LV)	± 5.1%	36%	25%	–	39%
Public Opinion Strategies	June 26–29, 2022	250 (LV)	± 6.2%	36%	18%	2% (Note: "Refused" with 2%)	44%
Remington Research Group (R)	May 18–19, 2022	346 (LV)	± 5.3%	22%	9%	–	69%

==== District 10 ====
Poll source	Date(s) administered	Sample size	Margin of error	Mike Carter	Travis Fitzwater	Randy Pietzman	Jeff Porter	Joshua Price	Bryan Spencer	Undecided
Remington Research Group (R)	July 22–25, 2022	314 (LV)	± 5.5%	28%	18%	–	10%	8%	10%	25%
The Tarrance Group (R) (Note: Poll sponsored by Carter's campaign)	June 14–16, 2022	303 (LV)	± 5.8%	42%	13%	–	10%	3%	12%	25%
Remington Research Group (R)	April 9–11, 2022	301 (LV)	± 5.3%	10%	17%	15%	8%	3%	7%	40%

==== District 12 ====
Poll source	Date(s) administered	Sample size	Margin of error	Rusty Black	J. Eggleston	Delus Johnson	Undecided
Remington Research Group (R)	July 22–24, 2022	377 (LV)	± 5.1%	42%	24%	8%	25%

==== District 16 ====
Poll source	Date(s) administered	Sample size	Margin of error	Justin Brown	Suzie Pollock	Undecided
Remington Research Group (R)	June 8–9, 2022	326 (LV)	± 5.3%	40%	23%	37%

==== District 20 ====
Poll source	Date(s) administered	Sample size	Margin of error	Brian Gelner	Curtis Trent	Undecided
Remington Research Group (R)	July 23–26, 2022	303 (LV)	± 5.5%	29%	42%	29%
Remington Research Group (R)	May 31 – June 2, 2022	322 (LV)	± 5.3%	6%	17%	77%

==== District 22 ====
Poll source	Date(s) administered	Sample size	Margin of error	Mary Elizabeth Coleman	Shane Roden	Jeff Roorda	Dan Shaul	Undecided
Remington Research Group (R)	July 25–28, 2022	303 (LV)	± 5.5%	23%	14%	22%	16%	25%
Remington Research Group (R)	March 30 – April 1, 2022	326 (LV)	± 5.3%	15%	10%	16%	12%	47%

==== District 26 ====
Poll source	Date(s) administered	Sample size	Margin of error	Ben Brown	Jason Franklin	Bob Jones	Merry-Noella Skaggs	Nate Tate	Undecided
Remington Research Group (R)	July 24–27, 2022	309 (LV)	± 5.5%	18%	1%	22%	4%	23%	32%
Remington Research Group (R)	July 24–27, 2022	309 (LV)	± 5.5%	4%	1%	5%	5%	20%	65%

=== General election polling ===
==== District 24 ====
Poll source	Date(s) administered	Sample size	Margin of error	Tracy McCreery (D)	Georga Hruza (R)	LaDonna Higgins (L)	Undecided
Remington Research Group (R)	October 18–20, 2022	406 (LV)	± 4.9%	49%	44%	1%	7%
Remington Research Group (R)	September 13–16, 2022	441 (LV)	± 4.8%	50%	42%	1%	7%
Show Me Victories (D) (Note: Poll sponsord by McCreery's campaign)	May 21–22, 2022	638 (RV)	± 3.5%	49%	35%	–	16%

==== District 30 ====
Poll source	Date(s) administered	Sample size	Margin of error	Lincoln Hough (R)	Raymond Lampert (D)	Undecided
Remington Research Group (R)	September 21–22, 2022	406 (LV)	± 4.9%	52%	40%	8%

== Detailed Results by Senate District ==
Sources for election results:

=== District 2 ===
Primary Election Results
Party	Candidate	Votes	%
Republican Party Primary Results
Republican	Nick Schroer	12,047	57.60%
Republican	John D. Wiemann	8,868	42.40%
Total votes		20,915	100.00%
Democratic Party Primary Results
Democratic	Michael Sinclair	8,561	100.00%
Total votes		8,561	100.00%

General Election Results
Party	Candidate	Votes	%
Republican	Nick Schroer	42,568	63.00%
Democratic	Michael Sinclair	24,998	37.00%
Total votes		67,566	100.00%
Republican hold			

=== District 4 ===
Primary Election Results
Party	Candidate	Votes	%
Democratic Party Primary Results
Democratic	Karla May (incumbent)	24,644	100.00%
Total votes		24,644	100.00%
Republican Party Primary Results
Republican	Mary Theresa McLean	5,506	100.00%
Total votes		5,506	100.00%

General Election Results
Party	Candidate	Votes	%
Democratic	Karla May (incumbent)	51,419	74.17%
Republican	Mary Theresa McLean	17,906	25.83%
Total votes		69,325	100.00%
Democratic hold			

=== District 6 ===
Primary Election Results
Party	Candidate	Votes	%
Republican Party Primary Results
Republican	Mike Bernskoetter (incumbent)	17,441	55.49%
Republican	Scott Riedel	13,991	44.51%
Total votes		31,432	100.00%

General Election Results
Party	Candidate	Votes	%
Republican	Mike Bernskoetter (incumbent)	56,424	100.00%
Total votes		56,424	100.00%
Republican hold			

=== District 8 ===
Primary Election Results
Party	Candidate	Votes	%
Republican Party Primary Results
Republican	Mike Cierpiot (incumbent)	9,085	49.96%
Republican	Joe Nicola	5,600	30.79%
Republican	Rachl Aguirre	3,500	19.25%
Total votes		18,185	100.00%
Democratic Party Primary Results
Democratic	Antoine D. Jennings	12,713	100.00%
Total votes		12,713	100.00%

General Election Results
Party	Candidate	Votes	%
Republican	Mike Cierpiot (incumbent)	38,018	55.81%
Democratic	Antoine D. Jennings	30,100	44.19%
Total votes		68,118	100.00%
Republican hold			

=== District 10 ===
Primary Election Results
Party	Candidate	Votes	%
Republican Party Primary Results
Republican	Travis Fitzwater	7,625	31.46%
Republican	Mike (Michael) Carter	6,948	28.67%
Republican	Bryan Spencer	5,493	22.66%
Republican	Jeff Porter	3,343	13.79%
Republican	Joshua Price	827	3.41%
Total votes		24,236	100.00%
Libertarian Party Primary Results
Libertarian	Catherine Dreher	105	100.00%
Total votes		105	100.00%

General Election Results
Party	Candidate	Votes	%
Republican	Travis Fitzwater	44,169	77.63%
Libertarian	Catherine Dreher	12,728	22.37%
Total votes		56,897	100.00%
Republican hold			

=== District 12 ===
Primary Election Results
Party	Candidate	Votes	%
Republican Party Primary Results
Republican	Rusty Black	20,385	64.82%
Republican	J. Eggleston	8,153	25.92%
Republican	Delus Johnson	2,912	9.26%
Total votes		31,450	100.00%
Democratic Party Primary Results
Democratic	Michael J. Baumli	4,324	100.00%
Total votes		4,324	100.00%

General Election Results
Party	Candidate	Votes	%
Republican	Rusty Black	51,470	80.77%
Democratic	Michael J. Baumli	12,254	19.23%
Total votes		63,724	100.00%
Republican hold			

=== District 14 ===
Primary Election Results
Party	Candidate	Votes	%
Democratic Party Primary Results
Democratic	Brian Williams (incumbent)	18,063	100.00%
Total votes		18,063	100.00%

General Election Results
Party	Candidate	Votes	%
Democratic	Brian Williams (incumbent)	41,832	99.94%
Independent	John Winkler (Note: The candidate ran a write-in campaign in this election.)	24	0.06%
Total votes		41,856	100.00%
Democratic hold			

=== District 16 ===
Primary Election Results
Party	Candidate	Votes	%
Republican Party Primary Results
Republican	Justin Dan Brown (incumbent)	10,986	50.91%
Republican	Suzie Pollock	10,595	49.09%
Total votes		21,581	100.00%
Democratic Party Primary Results
Democratic	Tara Anura	2,805	100.00%
Total votes		2,805	100.00%

General Election Results
Party	Candidate	Votes	%
Republican	Justin Dan Brown (incumbent)	39,087	80.67%
Democratic	Tara Anura	9,363	19.33%
Total votes		48,450	100.00%
Republican hold			

=== District 18 ===
Primary Election Results
Party	Candidate	Votes	%
Republican Party Primary Results
Republican	Cindy O'Laughlin (incumbent)	19,720	100.00%
Total votes		19,720	100.00%
Democratic Party Primary Results
Democratic	Ayanna Shivers	3,850	100.00%
Total votes		3,850	100.00%

General Election Results
Party	Candidate	Votes	%
Republican	Cindy O'Laughlin (incumbent)	42,989	75.78%
Democratic	Ayanna Shivers	13,739	24.22%
Total votes		56,728	100.00%
Republican hold			

=== District 20 ===
Primary Election Results
Party	Candidate	Votes	%
Republican Party Primary Results
Republican	Curtis Trent	16,106	58.44%
Republican	Brian Gelner	11,452	41.56%
Total votes		27,558	100.00%

General Election Results
Party	Candidate	Votes	%
Republican	Curtis Trent	54,504	100.00%
Total votes		54,504	100.00%
Republican hold			

=== District 22 ===
Primary Election Results
Party	Candidate	Votes	%
Republican Party Primary Results
Republican	Mary Elizabeth Coleman	7,615	34.86%
Republican	Jeff Roorda	5,246	24.02%
Republican	Dan Shaul	5,095	23.33%
Republican	Shane Roden	3,886	17.79%
Total votes		21,842	100.00%
Democratic Party Primary Results
Democratic	Benjamin Hagin	7,680	100.00%
Total votes		7,680	100.00%

General Election Results
Party	Candidate	Votes	%
Republican	Mary Elizabeth Coleman	40,695	65.48%
Democratic	Benjamin Hagin	21,456	34.52%
Total votes		62,151	100.00%
Republican hold			

=== District 24 ===
Primary Election Results
Party	Candidate	Votes	%
Democratic Party Primary Results
Democratic	Tracy McCreery	18,367	100.00%
Total votes		18,367	100.00%
Republican Party Primary Results
Republican	George J. Hruza	8,325	59.25%
Republican	Brett A. Schenck	5,725	40.75%
Total votes		14,050	100.00%
Libertarian Party Primary Results
Libertarian	LaDonna Higgins	83	100.00%
Total votes		83	100.00%

General Election Results
Party	Candidate	Votes	%
Democratic	Tracy McCreery	43,081	53.37%
Republican	George J. Hruza	36,164	44.80%
Libertarian	LaDonna Higgins	1,481	1.83%
Total votes		80,726	100.00%
Democratic hold			

=== District 26 ===
Primary Election Results
Party	Candidate	Votes	%
Republican Party Primary Results
Republican	Ben Brown	10,811	39.00%
Republican	Bob Jones	7,735	27.90%
Republican	Nate Tate	7,394	26.67%
Republican	Merry-Noella Skaggs	1,041	3.76%
Republican	Jason Franklin	742	2.68%
Total votes		27,723	100.00%
Democratic Party Primary Results
Democratic	John Kiehne	5,720	100.00%
Total votes		5,720	100.00%

General Election Results
Party	Candidate	Votes	%
Republican	Ben Brown	48,469	73.90%
Democratic	John Kiehne	17,115	26.10%
Total votes		65,584	100.00%
Republican hold			

=== District 28 ===
Primary Election Results
Party	Candidate	Votes	%
Republican Party Primary Results
Republican	Sandy Crawford (incumbent)	18,995	63.66%
Republican	Janet Arnold	5,722	19.18%
Republican	Bill Yarberry	5,119	17.16%
Total votes		29,836	100.00%

General Election Results
Party	Candidate	Votes	%
Republican	Sandy Crawford (incumbent)	55,062	100.00%
Total votes		55,062	100.00%
Republican hold			

=== District 30 ===
Primary Election Results
Party	Candidate	Votes	%
Republican Party Primary Results
Republican	Lincoln Hough (incumbent)	8,771	56.62%
Republican	Angela Romine	6,721	43.38%
Total votes		15,492	100.00%
Democratic Party Primary Results
Democratic	Raymond Lampert	8,300	100.00%
Total votes		8,300	100.00%

General Election Results
Party	Candidate	Votes	%
Republican	Lincoln Hough (incumbent)	30,483	57.57%
Democratic	Raymond Lampert	22,464	42.43%
Total votes		52,947	100.00%
Republican hold			

=== District 32 ===
Primary Election Results
Party	Candidate	Votes	%
Republican Party Primary Results
Republican	Jill Carter	13,440	52.24%
Republican	William (Bill) White (incumbent)	12,286	47.76%
Total votes		25,726	100.00%

General Election Results
Party	Candidate	Votes	%
Republican	Jill Carter	46,763	100.00%
Total votes		46,763	100.00%
Republican hold			

=== District 34 ===
Primary Election Results
Party	Candidate	Votes	%
Republican Party Primary Results
Republican	Tony Luetkemeyer (incumbent)	14,881	100.00%
Total votes		14,881	100.00%
Democratic Party Primary Results
Democratic	Sarah Shorter	10,642	100.00%
Total votes		10,642	100.00%

General Election Results
Party	Candidate	Votes	%
Republican	Tony Luetkemeyer (incumbent)	37,236	59.10%
Democratic	Sarah Shorter	25,767	40.90%
Total votes		63,003	100.00%
Republican hold			

== See also ==
- 2022 United States elections
- 2022 United States Senate election in Missouri
- 2022 United States House of Representatives elections in Missouri
- 2022 Missouri elections
- 2022 Missouri House of Representatives election
- Missouri General Assembly
- Missouri Senate

== Notes ==
Partisan clients
