= Mike Deering =

American politician

Member-elect of the Missouri Senate from the 10th district
- Assuming office January 12, 2027
- Succeeding: Travis Fitzwater

Personal details
- Party: Republican
- Website: deeringformo.com

Mike Deering is an American politician of the Missouri Republican Party who is the representative-elect for the 10th district in the Missouri State Senate. He was elected at the 2026 election.
