= Missouri's 20th Senate district =

American legislative district

Missouri's 20th State Senate district
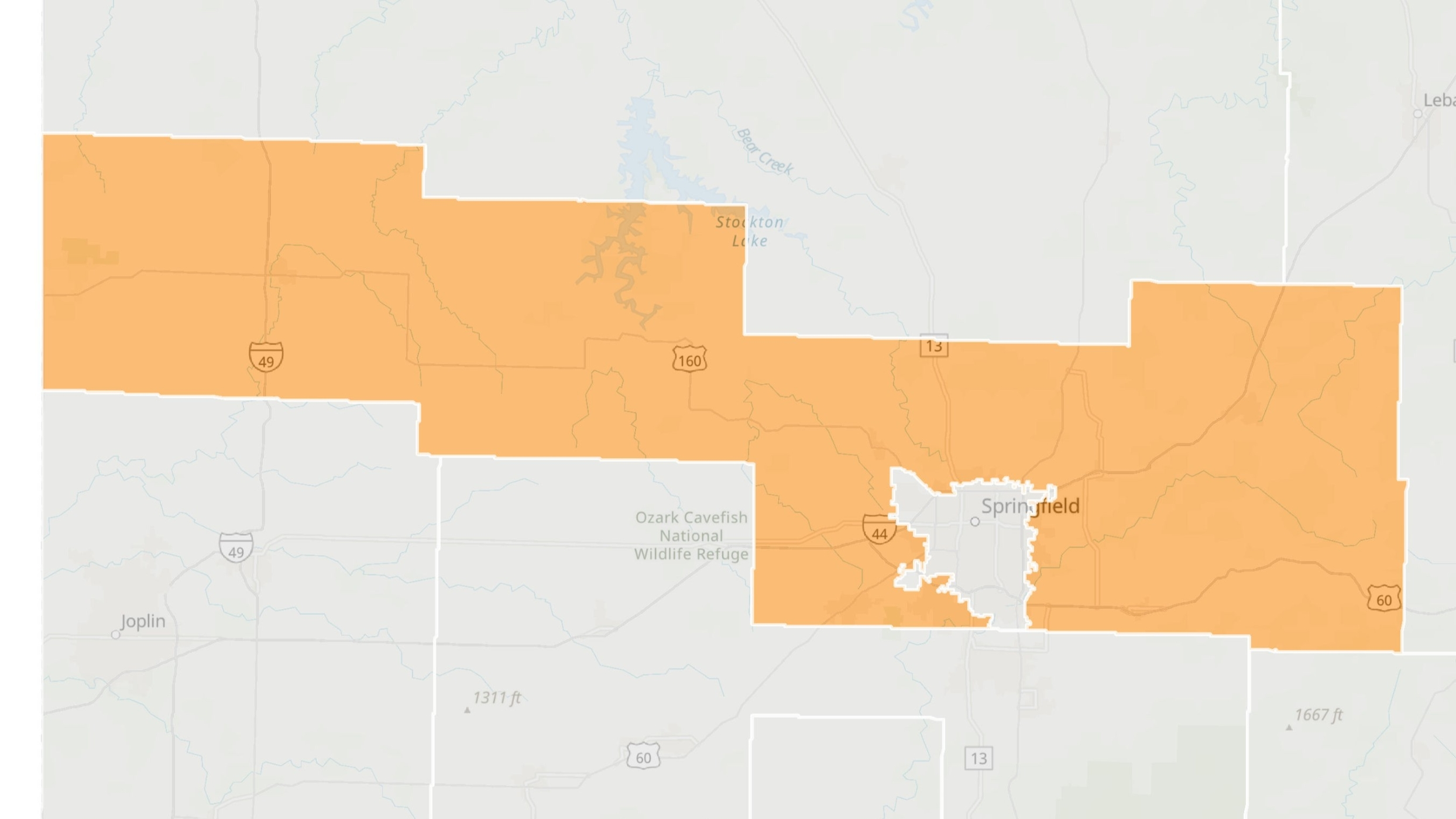
Senator
Curtis Trent; R–Battlefield
- Demographics: 89% White; 1% Black; 3% Hispanic; 2% Asian; 1% Other; 4% Multiracial
- Population (2023): 180,032

Missouri's 20th Senatorial District is one of 34 districts in the Missouri Senate. The district has been represented by Republican Curtis Trent since 2023.

== Geography ==
The district is based in southwestern Missouri and includes Barton, Dade, and Webster counties, and part of Greene County (the excluded portion is primarily Springfield city limits, which is District 30). Major municipalities in the district include Battlefield, Lamar, Marshfield, Republic, and Willard. The district is also home to the Harry S. Truman Birthplace State Historic Site and a portion of Stockton Lake.

== 2026 candidates ==
=== Republican primary ===
- Lori Rook, attorney
- Curtis Trent, incumbent senator

=== Democratic primary ===
- Sean Falconer, medical instructor

== Election results (1998–2022) ==
=== 1998 ===
Missouri's 20th Senatorial District election (1998)
Party	Candidate	Votes	%
Democratic	Danny Staples	24,814	60.2
Republican	Ed Doughty	11,753	28.5
Constitution	Alan Redburn	4,640	11.3
Total votes		41,207	100.0

=== 2002 ===
Missouri's 20th Senatorial District election (2002)
Party	Candidate	Votes	%
Republican	Dan Clemens	36,586	56.9
Democratic	Jim Kreider	27,721	43.1
Total votes		64,307	100.0
Republican gain from Democratic			

=== 2006 ===
Missouri's 20th Senatorial District election (2006)
Party	Candidate	Votes	%
Republican	Dan Clemens (incumbent)	51,495	64.5
Democratic	Barbie Kreider-Adams	28,352	35.5
Total votes		79,847	100.0
Republican hold			

=== 2010 ===
Missouri's 20th Senatorial District election (2010)
Party	Candidate	Votes	%
Republican	Jay Wasson	60,614	77.9
Democratic	Terry Traw	17,175	22.1
Total votes		77,789	100.0
Republican hold			

=== 2014 ===
Missouri's 20th Senatorial District election (2014)
Party	Candidate	Votes	%
Republican	Jay Wasson (incumbent)	40,191	100.0
Total votes		40,191	100.0
Republican hold			

=== 2018 ===
Missouri's 20th Senatorial District election (2018)
Party	Candidate	Votes	%
Republican	Eric Burlison	62,209	73.9
Democratic	Jim Billedo	22,004	26.1
Total votes		84,213	100.0
Republican hold			

=== 2022 ===
Missouri's 20th Senatorial District election (2022)
Party	Candidate	Votes	%
Republican	Curtis Trent	54,504	100.0
Total votes		54,504	100.0
Republican hold			

== Statewide election results ==
Year	Office	Results
2008	President	McCain 65.3 – 33.0%
2012	President	Romney 71.5 – 28.5%
2016	President	Trump 72.8 – 22.6%
2016	Senate	Blunt 66.4 – 29.7%
2016	Governor	Greitens 65.9 – 31.1%
2018	Senate	Hawley 67.5 – 29.6%
2020	President	Trump 73.6 – 24.8%
2020	Governor	Parson 73.9 – 24.1%
