= Jeff Porter (politician) =

American businessman and politician (born c.1962)

Member of the Missouri House of Representatives from the 42nd district
- In office January 2019 – January 2023
- Preceded by: Bart Korman
- Succeeded by: Jeff Myers

Personal details
- Born: c. 1962 (age 63–64)
- Party: Republican
- Spouse: Julie (m. 1985)
- Children: 2
- Education: University of Missouri

Jeff Porter (born c. 1962) is an American businessman and politician who served in the Missouri House of Representatives.

Porter is a member of the Republican Party. For 15 years he was mayor of Montgomery City.

In 2018, Porter accounced his candidacy for the 42nd district of the Missouri House of Representatives. He was elected and served from January 2019 to January 2023. Having succeeded Bart Korman, who was term limited, he represented Montgomery County and adjacent portions of Warren and Saint Charles counties.

During his tenure, Porter was chairman of the House Committee on Transportation, co-chair of the Joint Committee on Transportation Oversight, and vice-chairman of the Committee on Insurance; he was a member of the Committee on Homeland Security. He sponsored bills primarily regarding transportation and telecommunications. Three such bills were bans on distracted driving. He also supported lower taxes and smaller government oversight.

In 2022, Porter ran for the Missouri Senate from the 10th district, though lost in the primary to Travis Fitzwater. He was succeeded in the House by Jeff Myers. Outside of politics, he is also an insurance and real estate agent.

== Election results ==
2022 Republican primary – Missouri Senate – District 10
Party	Candidate	Votes	%	±%
Republican	Travis Fitzwater	7,625	31.5%	
Republican	Mike Carter	6,948	28.7%	
Republican	Bryan Spencer	5,493	22.7%	
Republican	Jeff Porter	3,343	13.8%	

2020 General election – Missouri House of Representatives – District 42 – Montgomery and parts of Warren and St. Charles Counties
Party	Candidate	Votes	%	±%
Republican	Jeff Porter	17,316	100.00%	30.38

2018 General election – Missouri House of Representatives – District 42 – Montgomery and parts of Warren and St. Charles Counties
Party	Candidate	Votes	%	±%
Republican	Jeff Porter	10,765	69.62%	13.92
Democratic	Joseph Widner	4,698	30.38%	–13.92

2018 Republican primary – Missouri House of Representatives – District 42 – Montgomery and parts of Warren and St. Charles Counties
Party	Candidate	Votes	%	±%
Republican	Jeff Porter	4,188	55.7%	
Republican	Jessica Catron	3,336	44.3%	
