= Renee Reuter =

American politician

Member of the Missouri House of Representatives from the 112th district
- Incumbent
- Assumed office January 4, 2023
- Preceded by: Rob Vescovo
- Succeeded by: Ed Callahan (elect)

Personal details
- Born: St. Louis, Missouri, U.S.
- Party: Republican
- Education: Colorado College
- Alma mater: Saint Louis University School of Law
- Website: reneereuter.info

Renee Reuter is an American attorney and politician serving as a Republican member of the Missouri House of Representatives, representing the state's 112th House district.

Reuter is a graduate from Colorado College. Reuter obtained a Juris Doctor from St. Louis University School of Law.

Reuter was a candidate for the 22nd district of the Missouri State Senate in the 2026 Missouri State Senate election.
