= Lori Rook =

American politician

Member-elect of the Missouri Senate from the 20th district
- Assuming office January 12, 2027
- Succeeding: Curtis Trent

Personal details
- Party: Republican
- Website: www.lorirook.com

Lori Rook is an American politician of the Missouri Republican Party who is the representative-elect for the 20th district in the Missouri State Senate. She defeated Republican Curtis Trent in the primary. She was elected in the 2026 general election.
