= David Robertson (Missouri politician) =

American politician

Member-elect of the Missouri House of Representatives from the 97th district
- Assuming office January 6, 2027
- Succeeding: David Casteel

Personal details
- Party: Republican
- Education: Lawrence University; Stanford University

David Robertson is an American politician of the Missouri Republican Party who is the representative-elect for the 97th district in the Missouri House of Representatives. He was elected in the 2026 general election. He defeated incumbent David Casteel in the primary.
