= Belinda Harris =

American politician (born 1951)

Member of the Missouri House of Representatives from the 110th district
- In office 2003–2011
- Succeeded by: Michael Frame

Personal details
- Born: April 29, 1951 (age 75)
- Party: Democratic Party

Belinda Harris (born April 29, 1951) is an American politician from the Democratic Party. She was member of the Missouri House of Representatives for the 110th district.
