= Tricia Byrnes =

Tricia Byrnes may refer to:

- Tricia Byrnes (snowboarder)
- Tricia Byrnes (politician)
