= Dering =

Dering is a surname, and may refer to:

- Charles L. Dering (1836–1921), American lawyer and politician
- Sir Cholmeley Dering, 4th Baronet (1679–1711), English politician
- Sir Edward Dering, 1st Baronet (1598–1644), English antiquary and politician
- Sir Edward Dering, 2nd Baronet (1625–1684), English politician
- Sir Edward Dering, 3rd Baronet (1650–1689), English politician
- Sir Edward Dering, 5th Baronet (c. 1705–1762), English politician
- Sir Edward Dering, 8th Baronet (1807–1896), English politician
- George Edward Dering (1831–1911), English inventor
- John Dering (disambiguation)
- Lady Mary Dering (1629–1704), English composer
- Richard Dering (c. 1580–1630), English composer
- Wladisław Dering, Polish physician, plaintiff in Dering v Uris

== See also ==
- Dering (1688 HBC vessel), see Hudson's Bay Company vessels
- Dering (1692 HBC vessel), see Hudson's Bay Company vessels
- Deering (disambiguation)
- Dearing (disambiguation)
