= Missouri's 6th Senate district =

American legislative district

Missouri's 6th State Senate district
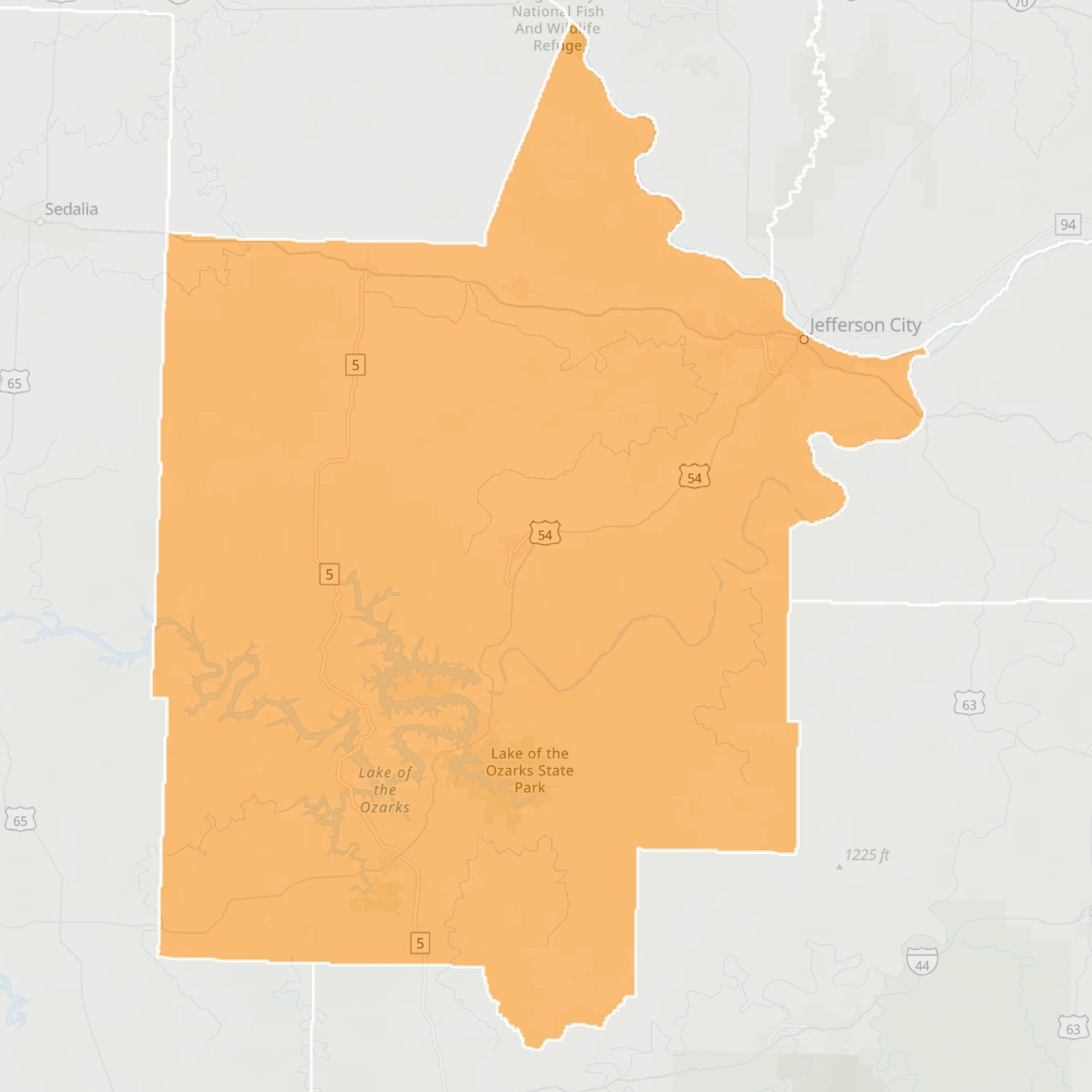
Senator
Mike Bernskoetter; R–Jefferson City
- Demographics: 87% White; 5% Black; 3% Hispanic; 1% Asian; 3% Multiracial
- Population (2023): 182,154

Missouri's 6th Senatorial District is one of 34 districts in the Missouri Senate. The district has been represented by Republican Mike Bernskoetter since 2019.

== Geography ==
The district is based in central Missouri including all of Cole, Camden, Miller, Moniteau and Morgan counties. The state capital of Jefferson City is within the district, with other municipalities including California, Camdenton, Eldon, and Osage Beach. The district is also home to the Lake of the Ozarks and Lincoln University of Missouri.

== 2026 candidates ==
=== Republican primary ===
- Amber Buckles
- Ike Skelton, Army veteran, current presiding commissioner of Camden County
- Derrick Spicer, sales director and Jefferson City Council member
- Lisa Thomas, former representative of the Missouri House
- Rudy Veit, representative of Missouri House District 59
- Jake Vogel, former U.S. Army ranger

== Election results (1998–2022) ==
=== 1998 ===
Missouri's 6th Senatorial District election (1998)
Party	Candidate	Votes	%
Republican	Larry Rohrbach	33,710	64.0
Democratic	Maurice Schulte	18,988	36.0
Total votes		52,698	100.0

=== 2002 ===
Missouri's 6th Senatorial District election (2002)
Party	Candidate	Votes	%
Republican	Carl M. Vogel	35,244	58.7
Democratic	W.W. Gratz	24,839	41.3
Total votes		60,083	100.0
Republican hold			

=== 2006 ===
Missouri's 6th Senatorial District election (2006)
Party	Candidate	Votes	%
Republican	Carl M. Vogel (incumbent)	44,103	67.9
Democratic	Ronald Bonar	20,862	32.1
Total votes		64,965	100.0
Republican hold			

=== 2010 ===
Missouri's 6th Senatorial District election (2010)
Party	Candidate	Votes	%
Republican	Mike Kehoe	52,402	100.0
Total votes		52,402	100.0
Republican hold			

=== 2014 ===
Missouri's 6th Senatorial District election (2014)
Party	Candidate	Votes	%
Republican	Mike Kehoe (incumbent)	37,561	79.1
Democratic	Mollie Kristen Freebairn	9,937	20.9
Total votes		47,498	100.0
Republican hold			

=== 2018 ===
Missouri's 6th Senatorial District election (2018)
Party	Candidate	Votes	%
Republican	Mike Bernskoetter	53,004	73.3
Democratic	Nicole Thompson	17,808	24.6
Libertarian	Steven Wilson	1,525	2.1
Total votes		72,356	100.0
Republican hold			

=== 2022 ===
Missouri's 6th Senatorial District election (2022)
Party	Candidate	Votes	%
Republican	Mike Bernskoetter (incumbent)	56,424	100.0
Total votes		56,424	100.0
Republican hold			

== Statewide election results ==
Year	Office	Results
2008	President	McCain 63.3 – 34.9%
2012	President	Romney 69.7 – 30.3%
2016	President	Trump 72.5 – 23.5%
2016	Senate	Blunt 62.2 – 33.7%
2016	Governor	Greitens 62.1 – 35.1%
2018	Senate	Hawley 67.5 – 29.4%
2020	President	Trump 73.2 – 25.3%
2020	Governor	Parson 74.1 – 23.8%
