= Senator Rohrbach =

Senator Rohrbach may refer to:

- Eric Rohrbach (born 1950s), Washington State Senate
- Larry Rohrbach (born 1946), Missouri State Senate
