= Henry Dering =

Henry Dering may refer to:

- Sir Henry Dering, 9th Baronet (1839–1906), British ambassador to Mexico and Brazil
- Sir Henry Edward Dering, 10th Baronet (1866–1931), of the Dering baronets

== See also ==
- Dering (surname)
