= Ed Callahan (politician) =

American politician

Member-elect of the Missouri House of Representatives from the 112th district
- Assuming office January 6, 2027
- Succeeding: Renee Reuter

Personal details
- Party: Republican
- Education: Southeast Missouri State University
- Website: Campaign website

Ed Callahan is an American politician of the Missouri Republican Party who is the representative-elect for the 112th district in the Missouri House of Representatives. He was elected in the 2026 general election. He succeeded Republican Renee Reuter. He is a pastor from Jefferson County, Missouri.
