= 2026 Missouri elections =

- November 3, 2026

A general election was held in the U.S. state of Missouri on November 3, 2026 as part of the 2026 United States elections.

== United States Congress ==
- 2026 United States House of Representatives elections in Missouri

== State ==
=== Ballot Measures ===
- 2026 Missouri Proposition A
- 2026 Missouri Amendment 3
- 2026 Missouri Amendment 4

=== State Elected Officers ===
- 2026 Missouri State Auditor election

=== Missouri General Assembly ===
- 2026 Missouri House of Representatives election
- 2026 Missouri State Senate election

== Local ==
=== St. Louis County ===
- 2026 St. Louis County Executive election

=== St. Charles County ===
- 2026 St. Charles County Executive election
