= Senator Staples =

Senator Staples may refer to:

- Abram Penn Staples (1885–1951), Virginia State Senate
- Danny Staples (politician) (1932–2002), Missouri State Senate
- Emily Anne Staples (1929–2018), Minnesota State Senate
- Todd Staples (born 1963), Texas State Senate
