= Jake Vogel =

American politician

Member-elect of the Missouri Senate from the 6th district
- Assuming office January 2027
- Succeeding: Mike Bernskoetter

Personal details
- Party: Republican

Jake Vogel is an American politician. A member of the Republican Party, he is the member-elect for the 6th district of the Missouri Senate.
