= George J. Hruza =

Dermatologist and researcher

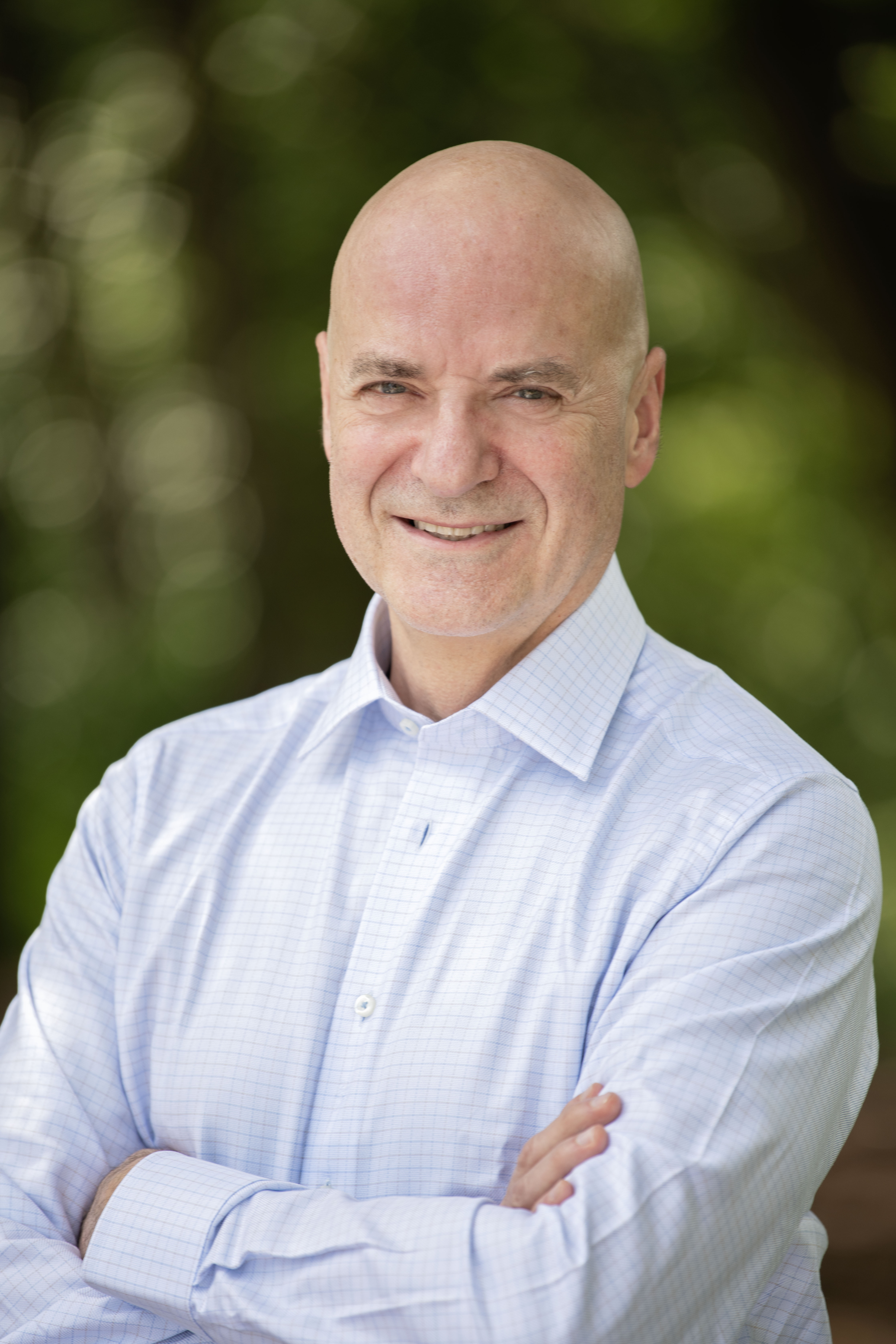

Member of the Missouri House of Representatives from the 89th district
- Incumbent
- Assumed office January 8, 2025
- Preceded by: Dean Plocher

Personal details
- Born: Prague, Czechoslovakia
- Party: Republican
- Website: https://hruzaformissouri.com/

George J. Hruza is an American politician serving as a member of the Missouri House of Representatives for the 89th district. Elected in November 2024, he assumed office on January 8, 2025. A member of the Republican Party, he worked as a dermatologist for 40 years and was a medical author affiliated with Saint Louis University School of Medicine as a clinical professor before entering politics.

== Biography ==
Hruza was born in Prague, Czechoslovakia before moving with his family to New York City and attended New York University, earning a bachelor's degree (1978) and medical degree (1982) before undertaking his dermatology residency there. After his residency he completed a laser surgery fellowships at Harvard and the University of Wisconsin-Madison and an MBA from Washington University in St. Louis.

Hruza was the president of the American Academy of Dermatology. He has written and published over 150 articles and 4 dermatology textbooks and previously led the St. Louis Metropolitan Medical Society, the American Society for Dermatologic Surgery, and the American Society for Laser Medicine and Surgery. He recently received the American Academy of Dermatology Association Advocate of the Year award for 2022.

George J. Hruza is a Republican politician from Missouri who ran for the Missouri Senate District 24 in 2022. He was elected to the Missouri House of Representatives in District 89 in the 2024 Missouri House of Representatives election as a Republican.

== Publications ==
A list of academic publications can be found here.

== Legislative Actions ==
Hruza's principal legislative effort concerned antisemitism in education. He filed a bill in 2025 requiring public schools and public postsecondary institutions to address antisemitic discrimination; a version was incorporated into a broader education bill that year, and he amended the provision to clarify that its adoption of the International Holocaust Remembrance Alliance working definition of antisemitism was not legally binding.

He refiled the measure as HB 2061 in 2026. Hruza said he sponsored it out of concern for the safety of Jewish students following the October 7, 2023 attacks on Israel, telling the House that Missouri Jewish students should not be held responsible for events in Israel and Gaza. The bill passed the House on February 16, 2026 by a vote of 109 to 21, after Hruza added language shielding conduct protected by the First Amendment. It was signed into law by Governor Mike Kehoe on April 23, 2026.

As enacted, the law was broadened to require reporting of all forms of discrimination rather than antisemitism alone, and amended to apply only in the context of harassment or intimidation. It requires public schools and universities to define antisemitic behavior in their codes of conduct and report incidents to state officials. The law took effect in September 2026 and continued to draw criticism that its ambiguity leaves administrators to determine whether criticism of Israel constitutes antisemitism.

== Committee Assignments (2025-26) ==
- Economic Development
- Emerging Issues
- Health and Mental Health
- Joint Committee on Tax Policy
- Joint Committee on the Life Sciences
- Professional Registration and Licensing

Missouri House of Representatives Election, November 5, 2024, District 89
| Party | Candidate | Votes | % | ±% |
|---|---|---|---|---|
| Republican | George Hruza | 12,711 | 57.30 | |
| Democratic | Eric Morse | 9,471 | 42.70 | |
| Total votes | | 22,182 | 100.00 | |
