= Michael Frame (politician) =

American politician

Member of the Missouri House of Representatives from the 110th district
- In office January 9, 2013 – January 7, 2015
- Preceded by: Belinda Harris
- Succeeded by: Shane Roden

Personal details
- Party: Democratic Party

Michael Frame is an American politician from the Democratic Party. He was member of the Missouri House of Representatives for the 110th district.

He is a union member from Eureka, Missouri.
