= David Casteel =

American politician

Member of the Missouri House of Representatives from the 97th district
- Incumbent
- Assumed office January 4, 2023
- Preceded by: Mary Elizabeth Coleman
- Succeeded by: David Robertson

Personal details
- Born: St. Louis, Missouri, U.S.
- Party: Republican
- Website: Campaign website

David Casteel is an American politician serving as a Republican member of the Missouri House of Representatives, representing the state's 97th House district.

== Career ==
Casteel is a small-business owner. He lost to David Robertson in the District 97 Republican Primary for the 2026 Missouri House of Representatives election.

He was a candidate for the 22nd district of the State Senate in the 2026 Missouri State Senate election.
