= Steve Stoll =

Steve Stoll may refer to:

- Steve Stoll (musician) (born 1967), American techno musician and label owner
- Steve Stoll (politician) (born 1947), American politician
