= Jay Wasson =

American politician

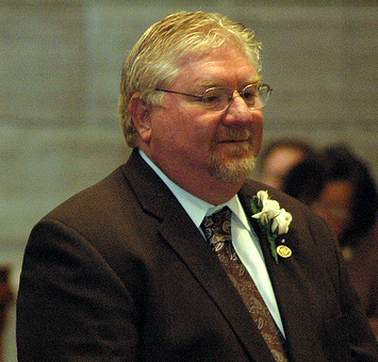

Member of the Missouri Senate from the 20th district
- In office January 5, 2011 – November 1, 2018
- Preceded by: Dan Clemens
- Succeeded by: Eric Burlison

Member of the Missouri House of Representatives from the 141st district
- In office January 8, 2003 – January 5, 2011
- Preceded by: Judy Berkstresser
- Succeeded by: Kevin Elmer

Personal details
- Born: October 24, 1956 (age 69) Springfield, Missouri, U.S.
- Party: Republican
- Spouse: Retha
- Education: Drury University

Jay Wasson (born October 24, 1956) is an American politician and businessman who served as a member of the Missouri Senate for the 20th district from 2011 to 2019. Previously, Wasson served four terms in the Missouri House of Representatives (2002–2010).

== Early life and education ==
Born in nearby Springfield, Jay Wasson was raised in Nixa, Missouri. His ancestors settled in Nixa in 1867. After graduation from Nixa Public High School in 1974, Wasson attended Drury University.

== Career ==
Outside of politics, Wasson works as a real estate developer. He is also a company officer for St. John's Health Systems, Inc.

=== Missouri Legislature ===
Wasson first entered statewide politics in 2002, winning the first of four consecutive terms to the Missouri House of Representatives. Term-limited by Missouri law from running for Representative again, Wasson mounted a successful campaign in 2010 for the Missouri Senate, defeating Democrat Terry Traw to replace term-limited Senator Dan Clemens. During his tenure in the Senate, Wasson served as chair of the Economic Development Committee.

=== 2022 congressional election ===
In September 2021, Wasson declared his candidacy for Missouri's 7th congressional district in the 2022 election.

== Personal life ==
Wasson and his wife, Retha, live in Nixa.
