= Dan Clemens =

American politician (1945–2019)

Member of the Missouri Senate from the 20th district
- In office January 8, 2003 – January 5, 2011
- Preceded by: Danny Staples
- Succeeded by: Jay Wasson

Personal details
- Born: January 3, 1945 Webster County, Missouri, U.S.
- Died: July 22, 2019 (aged 74) Marshfield, Missouri, U.S.
- Party: Republican
- Children: one
- Education: University of Missouri
- Occupation: farmer

Dan J. Clemens (January 3, 1945 – July 22, 2019) was a Republican member of the Missouri State Senate.

== Biography ==
He was born in Webster County, Missouri, and educated in the schools of Marshfield, where he was an active member of Future Farmers of America. He later went to the University of Missouri, where he was elected to the Missouri Senate, and obtained a master's degree in agriculture there. He was the owner and operator of a third-generation family farm where he raised row crops.

He attended the First Baptist Church, and served on the Soil and Water District Commission, the Agriculture Advisory Commission, and a farmer representative on the James River Partnership. He also served as president of the Marshfield School Board and the Webster Electric Co-op Foundation Board, and as state corporate board member of the Missouri Farmer's Association.

He was first elected to the Missouri State Senate in 2002, defeating Democratic state house speaker Jim Kreider. Due to Missouri term limit restrictions he was ineligible to run again in 2010. He died on July 22, 2019, at the age of 74. No cause was given.
