= Deering =

Deering may refer to:

== Places in the United States ==
- Deering, Alaska, a city
- Deering, Maine, a former town annexed to Portland in 1898
- Deering, Missouri, an unincorporated community
- Deering, New Hampshire, a town
  - Deering Reservoir
- Deering, North Dakota, a city

== People ==
- Adolph A. Deering, American politician
- Charles Deering (1852–1927), American business man and philanthropist
- Fred Deering (1923-2010), American politician
- James Deering (1859–1925), American industrialist, developer of Miami, Florida
- John Deering (baseball) (1879–1943), Major League Baseball pitcher
- John Deering (murderer) (1898–1938), American murderer executed by firing squad in Utah
- John Deering (politician) (1833-1904), American politician and mayor of Portland, Maine
- Mike Deering, American politician
- Myles Deering (born 1953), Army National Guard major general
- Pat Deering (born 1967), Irish politician
- Richard Dering (c. 1580–1630), also spelled Deering, English Renaissance and Baroque composer
- Rupert Deering, commandant of the penal settlement at Norfolk Island
- Steve Deering, Canadian computer scientist
- Terry Deering, American politician
- William Deering (1826–1913), American business man and philanthropist

== Companies ==
- Deering Harvester Company, founded in 1894 by William Deering
- Deering Banjo Company, founded in 1975 by Greg and Janet Deering

== Other uses ==
- Deering Library, Northwestern University, Evanston, Illinois, United States
- Deering High School, Portland, Maine, United States
- Deering Bridge, near Sutton, Nebraska, United States, on the National Register of Historic Places
- Carroll A. Deering, a sailing vessel found run aground in 1921
- Wilma Deering, a major fictional character associated with Buck Rogers
