= Missouri's 10th Senate district =

American legislative district

Missouri's 10th State Senate district
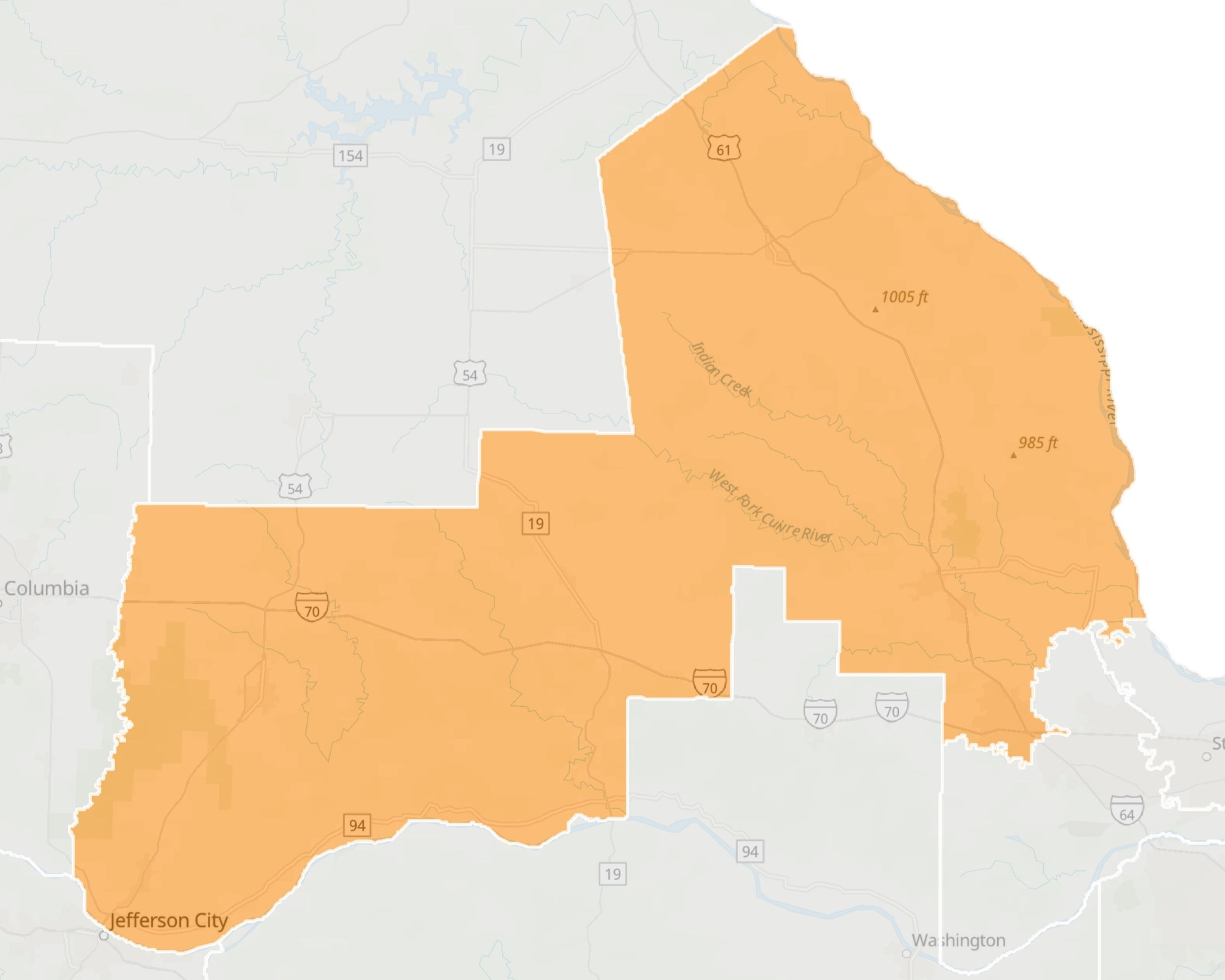
Senator
| Travis Fitzwater; R–Holts Summit |
- Demographics: 89% White; 3% Black; 3% Hispanic; 1% Asian; 3% Multiracial
- Population (2023): 185,536

Missouri's 10th Senatorial District is one of 34 districts in the Missouri Senate. The district has been represented by Republican Travis Fitzwater since 2023.

== Geography ==
The district is based northwest of the St. Louis metropolitan area and includes Callaway, Lincoln, Montgomery, Pike and northwestern St. Charles counties. Major municipalities in the district include Fulton, Troy, and Wentzville. The district is also home to Cuivre River State Park, William Woods University, and several other conservation areas.

== 2026 candidates ==
=== Republican primary ===
- Tricia Byrnes, state representative of House District 63
- Mike Deering, executive vice president of Missouri Cattlemen's Association

== Election results (1998–2022) ==
=== 1998 ===
Missouri's 10th Senatorial District election (1998)
| Party | Candidate | Votes | % |
|---|---|---|---|
| Democratic | Harry Wiggins | 27,936 | 60.4 |
| Republican | Ron Freeman | 18,350 | 39.6 |
| Total votes | | 46,286 | 100.0 |

=== 2002 ===
Missouri's 10th Senatorial District election (2002)
| Party | Candidate | Votes | % |
|---|---|---|---|
| Democratic | Charles B. Wheeler Jr. | 38,731 | 100.0 |
| Total votes | | 38,731 | 100.0 |
| Democratic hold | | | |

=== 2006 ===
Missouri's 10th Senatorial District election (2006)
| Party | Candidate | Votes | % |
|---|---|---|---|
| Democratic | Jolie L. Justus | 37,563 | 72.1 |
| Republican | M.J. Mounts | 14,536 | 27.9 |
| Total votes | | 52,099 | 100.0 |
| Democratic hold | | | |

=== 2010 ===
Missouri's 10th Senatorial District election (2010)
| Party | Candidate | Votes | % |
|---|---|---|---|
| Democratic | Jolie L. Justus (incumbent) | 33,634 | 76.4 |
| Libertarian | Bob Ludlow | 10,402 | 23.6 |
| Total votes | | 44,036 | 100.0 |
| Democratic hold | | | |

=== 2014 ===
Missouri's 10th Senatorial District election (2014)
| Party | Candidate | Votes | % |
|---|---|---|---|
| Republican | Jeanie Riddle | 28,871 | 67.6 |
| Democratic | Ed Schieffer | 13,856 | 32.4 |
| Total votes | | 42,727 | 100.0 |
| Republican gain from Democratic | | | |

=== 2018 ===
Missouri's 10th Senatorial District election (2018)
| Party | Candidate | Votes | % |
|---|---|---|---|
| Republican | Jeanie Riddle (incumbent) | 48,322 | 70.3 |
| Democratic | Ayanna Shivers | 20,412 | 29.7 |
| Total votes | | 68,734 | 100.0 |
| Republican hold | | | |

=== 2022 ===
Missouri's 10th Senatorial District election (2022)
| Party | Candidate | Votes | % |
|---|---|---|---|
| Republican | Travis Fitzwater | 44,169 | 77.6 |
| Libertarian | Catherine Dreher | 12,728 | 22.4 |
| Total votes | | 56,897 | 100.0 |
| Republican hold | | | |

== Statewide election results ==
| Year | Office | Results |
|---|---|---|
| 2008 | President | McCain 56.9 – 41.9% |
| 2012 | President | Romney 65.0 – 35.0% |
| 2016 | President | Trump 70.1 – 25.1% |
| 2016 | Senate | Blunt 56.7 – 37.9% |
| 2016 | Governor | Greitens 58.3 – 38.2% |
| 2018 | Senate | Hawley 60.8 – 35.4% |
| 2020 | President | Trump 71.0 – 27.1% |
| 2020 | Governor | Parson 70.0 – 27.7% |
