= 2026 Missouri State Auditor election =

- November 3, 2026
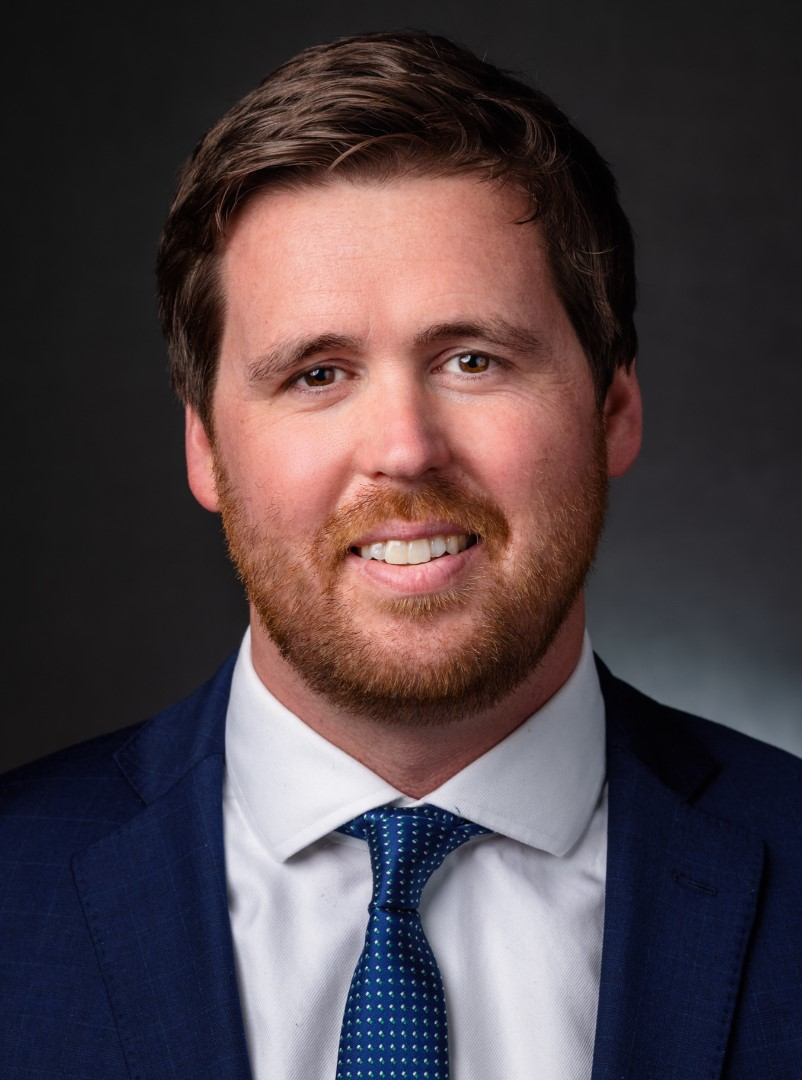

| Nominee | Scott Fitzpatrick | Quentin Wilson |
| Party | Republican | Democratic |
| Popular vote | 1,058,853 | 967,009 |
| Percentage | 50.92% | 46.50% |
- County results Fitzpatrick: 50–60% 60–70% 70–80% 80–90% Wilson: 50–60% 60–70% 80–90%
State Auditor before election
Scott Fitzpatrick
Republican
Elected State Auditor
Scott Fitzpatrick
Republican

The 2026 Missouri State Auditor election was held on November 3, 2026, to elect the state auditor of Missouri. Primary elections will take place on August 4, 2026. Republican incumbent Scott Fitzpatrick won re-election to a second term.

== Republican primary ==
=== Candidates ===
==== Nominee ====
- Scott Fitzpatrick, incumbent state auditor of Missouri (2023–present)

==== Eliminated in primary ====
- Gerald (Jerry) Wistrand Jr., IT auditing specialist

=== Endorsements ===
Scott Fitzpatrick

Labor unions

- Missouri AFL-CIO

Newspapers

- St. Louis Post-Dispatch

=== Results ===
Republican primary results
| Party | Candidate | Votes | % |
|---|---|---|---|
| Republican | Scott Fitzpatrick (incumbent) | 549,997 | 85.5 |
| Republican | Gerald (Jerry) Wistrand Jr. | 93,012 | 14.5 |
| Total votes | | 643,009 | 100.0 |

== Democratic primary ==
=== Candidates ===
==== Nominee ====
- Quentin Wilson, former director of the Missouri Department of Revenue

==== Eliminated in primary ====
- Greg Upchurch, small business owner

=== Endorsements ===
Quentin Wilson

Labor unions

- Missouri AFL-CIO
- Missouri and Kansas Laborers District Council

Organizations

- Freedom, Inc.

Newspapers

- St. Louis Post-Dispatch

=== Results ===
Democratic primary results
| Party | Candidate | Votes | % |
|---|---|---|---|
| Democratic | Quentin Wilson | 325,648 | 67.8 |
| Democratic | Gregory Upchurch | 154,346 | 32.2 |
| Total votes | | 479,994 | 100.0 |

== Libertarian primary ==
=== Candidates ===
==== Nominee ====
- Dustin Coffell, chair of the Libertarian Party of Missouri

=== Results ===
Libertarian primary results
| Party | Candidate | Votes | % |
|---|---|---|---|
| Libertarian | Dustin Coffell | 6,716 | 100.0 |
| Total votes | | 6,716 | 100.0 |

== General election ==
=== Polling ===
| Poll source | Date(s) administered | Sample size (Note: Key: A – all adults RV – registered voters LV – likely voters V – unclear) | Margin of error | Scott Fitzpatrick (R) | Quentin Wilson (D) | Other | Undecided |
|---|---|---|---|---|---|---|---|
| YouGov/Saint Louis University | August 13–24, 2026 | 449 (LV) | ± 5.9% | 45% | 43% | 2% | 10% |

==== Post-primary endorsements ====
Quentin Wilson (D)

Labor unions

- United Auto Workers

=== Results ===
2026 Missouri State Auditor election
| Party | Candidate | Votes | % | ±% |
|---|---|---|---|---|
| Republican | Scott Fitzpatrick (incubment) | | | |
| Democratic | Quentin Wilson | | | |
| Libertarian | Dustin Coffell | | | |
| Total votes | | | 100.0 | |
