= Jim Avery (politician) =

American politician

Member of the Missouri House of Representatives from the 95th district
- In office 2003–2009

Personal details
- Party: Republican
- Education: Saint Louis University School of Law
- Website: www.jimavery.com

Jim Avery is an American politician who was a Republican member of the Missouri House of Representatives, representing the state's 95th House district.

Avery is a candidate in the 2026 Missouri State Senate election for Missouri's 22nd Senate district.
