= Missouri's 22nd Senate district =

American legislative district

Missouri's 22nd State Senate district
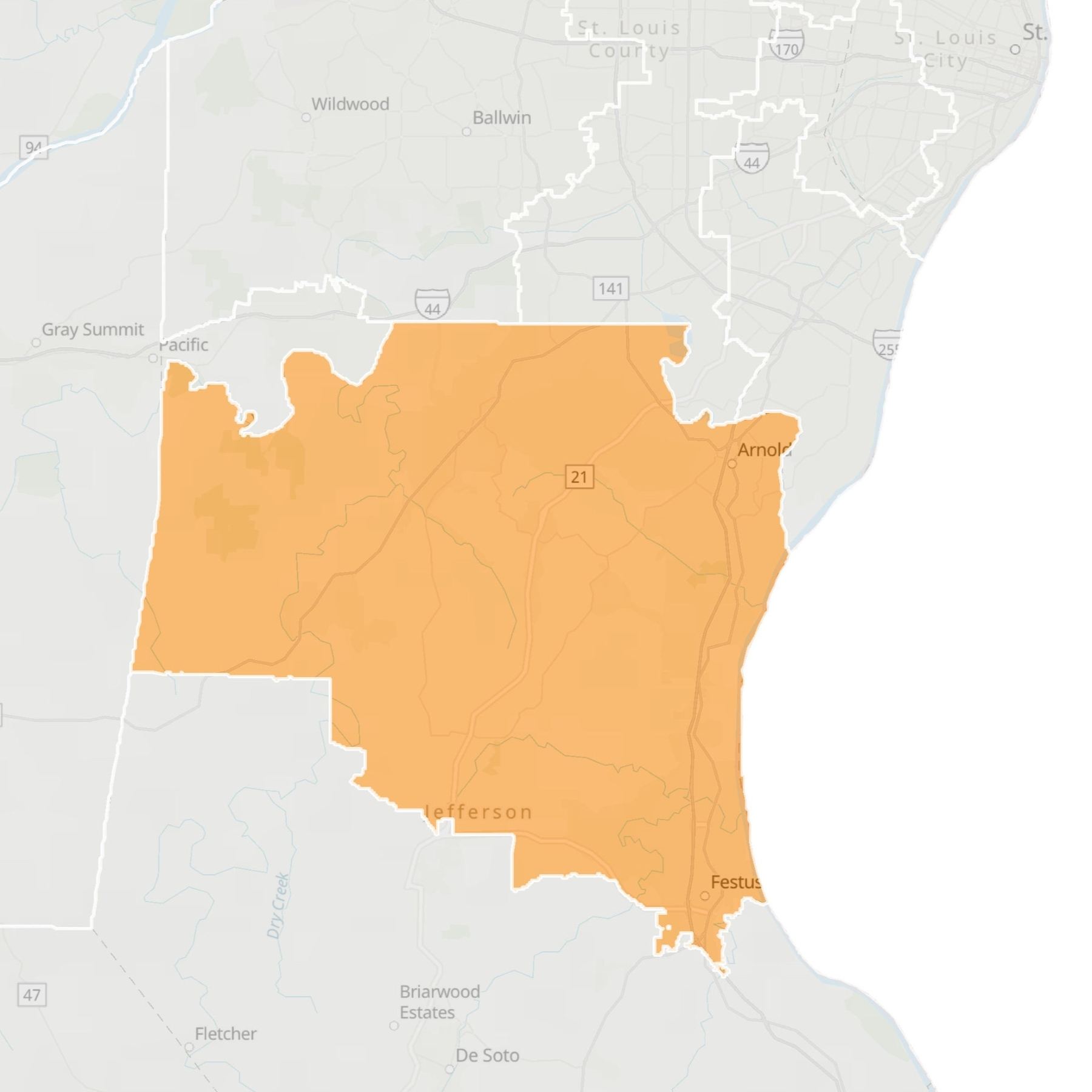
Senator
Mary Elizabeth Coleman; R–Arnold
- Demographics: 89% White; 1% Black; 3% Hispanic; 1% Asian; 6% Multiracial
- Population (2023): 181,241

Missouri's 22nd Senatorial District is one of 34 districts in the Missouri Senate. The district has been represented by Republican Mary Elizabeth Coleman since 2023.

== Geography ==
The district is based in northern Jefferson County on the south side of the St. Louis metropolitan area. Major municipalities in the district include Arnold, Crystal City, Festus, and Pevely. The district is also home to the Mastodon State Historic Site.

== 2026 candidates ==
=== Republican primary ===
- Jim Avery, former state representative
- David Robertson, retired college professor

=== Democratic primary ===
- Jeff Abney, attorney

== Election results (1998–2022) ==
=== 1998 ===
Missouri's 22nd Senatorial District election (1998)
Party	Candidate	Votes	%
Democratic	Steve Stoll	22,615	57.0
Republican	David Broach	17,050	43.0
Total votes		39,665	100.0

=== 2002 ===
Missouri's 22nd Senatorial District election (2002)
Party	Candidate	Votes	%
Democratic	Steve Stoll (incumbent)	28,854	60.0
Republican	George Engelbach	19,254	40.0
Total votes		48,108	100.0
Democratic hold			

=== 2005 ===
Missouri's 22nd Senatorial District special election (2005)
Party	Candidate	Votes	%
Republican	Bill Alter	6,865	30.1
Democratic	Rick Johnson	6,797	29.8
Independent	Harold R. Selby	6,277	27.5
Independent	Zip Rzeppa	2,854	12.5
Total votes		22,793	100.0
Republican gain from Democratic			

=== 2006 ===
Missouri's 22nd Senatorial District election (2006)
Party	Candidate	Votes	%
Democratic	Ryan McKenna	34,682	60.5
Republican	Bill Alter (incumbent)	22,675	39.5
Total votes		57,357	100.0
Democratic gain from Republican			

=== 2010 ===
Missouri's 22nd Senatorial District election (2010)
Party	Candidate	Votes	%
Democratic	Ryan McKenna (incumbent)	27,380	52.6
Republican	Greg Zotta	24,701	47.4
Total votes		52,081	100.0
Democratic hold			

=== 2014 ===
Missouri's 22nd Senatorial District election (2014)
Party	Candidate	Votes	%
Republican	Paul Wieland	22,208	54.2
Democratic	Jeff Roorda	18,774	45.8
Total votes		40,982	100.0
Republican gain from Democratic			

=== 2018 ===
Missouri's 22nd Senatorial District election (2018)
Party	Candidate	Votes	%
Republican	Paul Wieland (incumbent)	40,556	58.3
Democratic	Robert Butler	26,903	38.7
Libertarian	Richie Camden	2,078	3.0
Total votes		69,537	100.0
Republican hold			

=== 2022 ===
Missouri's 22nd Senatorial District election (2022)
Party	Candidate	Votes	%
Republican	Mary Elizabeth Coleman	40,695	65.5
Democratic	Benjamin Hagin	21,456	34.5
Total votes		62,151	100.0
Republican hold			

== Statewide election results ==
Year	Office	Results
2008	President	Obama 50.2 – 48.4%
2012	President	Romney 56.7 – 43.3%
2016	President	Trump 64.2 – 30.5%
2016	Senate	Blunt 50.1 – 44.8%
2016	Governor	Greitens 53.7 – 42.7%
2018	Senate	Hawley 53.8 – 42.5%
2020	President	Trump 64.6 – 33.5%
2020	Governor	Parson 62.8 – 34.7%
