= Rocky Miller =

American politician

Member of the Missouri House of Representatives from the 124th district
- In office 2013 – January 5, 2021
- Succeeded by: Lisa Thomas

Personal details
- Born: October 22, 1965 (age 60) West Palm Beach, Florida, U.S.
- Party: Republican
- Spouse: Della
- Children: 4

Rocky Miller (born October 22, 1965) is an American politician. who served as a member of the Missouri House of Representatives for the 124th district from 2013 to 2021. He is a member of the Republican Party.
