= Richard West (Missouri politician) =

Missouri politician

Member of the Missouri House of Representatives from the 102nd district
- Incumbent
- Assumed office January 2023
- Preceded by: Ron Hicks (redistricted)

Member of the Missouri House of Representatives from the 63rd district
- In office January 2021 – January 2023
- Preceded by: Bryan Spencer
- Succeeded by: Tricia Byrnes

Mayor of New Melle, Missouri
- In office April 2014 – April 2022
- Succeeded by: Steve Burt

Personal details
- Party: Republican
- Education: Western International University

Richard West is an American politician, businessman, and retired law enforcement officer. He is a Republican member of the Missouri House of Representatives from the 102nd district. Prior to redistricting he represented the 63rd district, which consisted of parts of western St. Charles County and parts of eastern Warren County. West is a former mayor of New Melle, Missouri, and completed his 4th two-year mayoral term in 2022.

When West was in law enforcement he served as a criminal investigator of 21 years, and served 28 months overseas working as an international police advisor in Iraq.

== Education ==
West graduated Bishop Du Bourg High School in 1985 and attended Western International University.

== Electoral history ==
Missouri House of Representatives Primary Election, August 4, 2020, District 63
Party	Candidate	Votes	%	±%
Republican	Richard West	3,748	65.08%	
Republican	Dale Shaper	2,011	34.92%	
Total votes		5,759	100.00%	

General election for Missouri House of Representatives – District 63 (2020)
Party	Candidate	Votes	%	±%
Republican	Richard West	23,062	100%	

Missouri House of Representatives Election, November 8, 2022, District 102
Party	Candidate	Votes	%	±%
Republican	Richard West	12,034	100.00%	0.00

Missouri House of Representatives Election, November 5, 2024, District 102
Party	Candidate	Votes	%	±%
Republican	Richard West	14,344	64.56%	
Democratic	Alex Hissong	7,873	35.44%	
Total votes		22,217	100.00%	
