= Bart Korman =

American politician

Member of the Missouri House of Representatives from the 42nd district
- In office January 2013 – January 2019
- Preceded by: Leonard Hughes IV
- Succeeded by: Jeff Porter

Member of the U.S. House of Representatives from Missouri's 99th district
- In office January 2011 – January 2013
- Succeeded by: Andrew Koenig

Personal details
- Born: December 20, 1975 (age 50) Hermann, Missouri
- Party: Republican
- Children: 2
- Education: University of Missouri

Bart Korman is an American businessman and politician from the state of Missouri. A Republican, he is a former member of the Missouri House of Representatives, first elected from what was then Missouri's 99th District in November 2010, and re-elected each two years through 2016 from the 42nd District, unopposed except in 2014. Korman represented Montgomery County and adjacent portions of Warren and Saint Charles counties. He was term-limited in 2018 and Republican Jeff Porter was elected to succeed him. Korman works as a land surveyor and engineer, and is an auctioneer for his family's auction business.

== Election results ==
Missouri House of Representatives — District 42 — Montgomery and parts of Warren and St. Charles Counties (2016)
| Party | Candidate | Votes | % | ±% |
|---|---|---|---|---|
| Republican | Bart Korman | 15,803 | 100.00% | |

Missouri House of Representatives — District 42 — Montgomery and parts of Warren and St. Charles Counties (2014)
| Party | Candidate | Votes | % | ±% |
|---|---|---|---|---|
| Republican | Bart Korman | 7,054 | 73.3% | |
| Democratic | Rod Sturgeon | 2,567 | 26.7% | |

Missouri House of Representatives — District 42 — Montgomery and parts of Warren and St. Charles Counties (2012)
| Party | Candidate | Votes | % | ±% |
|---|---|---|---|---|
| Republican | Bart Korman | 14,452 | 100.00% | |

Missouri House of Representatives — District 99 (2010)
| Party | Candidate | Votes | % | ±% |
|---|---|---|---|---|
| Republican | Bart Korman | 12,030 | 100.00% | |
