= Bill Alter =

Missouri Republican politician

Bill Alter (May 15, 1944 - November 29, 2024) was a former Missouri Republican politician who served in the Missouri Senate. He lived in High Ridge, Missouri, with his wife Merijo.

He was born in Iowa City, Iowa, in 1944. After moving to Missouri, and he graduated from the Parkway School District. He then entered the United States Navy and attended their Electronics School from 1963 to 1965. From 1982 through 1984 he attended the Jefferson College Law Enforcement Training Center. He has since gained twenty-two years of law enforcement experience.

Alter was a reserve police officer, starting out with the Jefferson County Sheriff’s Office. However, Bill spent the majority of his career with the Byrnes Mill Police Department, where he retired in 2022 with over 40 years in law enforcement. He is the owner of a management business, and a vice president of a national company. He is a member of the National Rifle Association of America and the former president of the High Ridge Rotary Club.

He was elected to the Missouri House of Representatives in 1989, and served in that body through 2000. He was elected to the Missouri Senate in a special election in 2005.

He served on the following committees:

- Aging, Families, Mental and Public Health
- Education
- Judiciary and Civil and Criminal Jurisprudence
- Small Business, Insurance, and Industrial Relations
- Transportation
- Joint Committee on Terrorism, Bioterrorism and Homeland Security
- Senate Interim Committee on Adoption Promotion and Child Support Enforcement
