= Jeanie Riddle =

American politician (born c.1954)

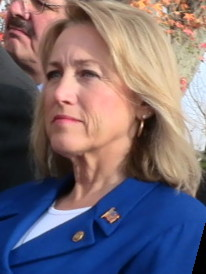

Member of the Missouri State Senate from the 10th district
- In office January 7, 2015 – January 4, 2023
- Preceded by: Jolie Justus
- Succeeded by: Travis Fitzwater

Member of the Missouri House of Representatives from the 49th district
- In office January 7, 2009 – January 7, 2015
- Preceded by: Danielle Moore
- Succeeded by: Travis Fitzwater

Personal details
- Party: Republican
- Education: Drury University
- Profession: Teacher, coach

Jeanie Riddle (born c. 1954) is an American politician from Missouri. A Republican, she served as a member of the Missouri House of Representatives from the 49th District in Callaway County and as a member of the Missouri Senate from the 10th District which includes the counties of Audrain, Callaway, Lincoln, Monroe, Montgomery and Warren.

== Personal history ==
Riddle is a 1972 graduate of McCluer High School in Florissant, Missouri. She received her higher education at Drury College in Springfield, earning a Bachelor's Degree in Education in 1976. Following college, she worked briefly in St. Louis in the accounting department of Southwestern Bell Telephone Company. In 1977, Riddle moved to Callaway County where she took a job as teacher and coach for the South Callaway R-II school district for 28 years. Riddle has two grown children — a son and a daughter and four grandchildren.

== Political career ==
Riddle was first elected to the Missouri House in 2008. She ran unopposed and was reelected in 2010, and was once again reelected to the newly drawn 49th district in 2012. She was then elected to the Missouri Senate in 2014 representing the 10th district. In her last term in the House, she served as Chair of the Rules Committee and was also a member of the Utilities committee and the Emerging Issues in Health Care committee. In 2010, she was elected by her fellow caucus members to serve as the Assistant Majority Floor Leader through 2012. In her first term, Riddle served as vice-chair of the Public Safety committee as well as a member of the Tax Reform, Energy and Environment committees, also the Appropriations-Public Safety and Corrections subcommittee.

Currently, Riddle serves as Chairwoman of the Joint Committee on Capitol Security, Chairwoman of the Joint Committee on Child Abuse and Neglect, Chairwoman of the Professional Registration Committee, and Vice-Chairwoman of the Seniors, Families and Children Committee.

== Electoral history ==
=== State representative ===
Missouri House of Representatives Primary Election, August 5, 2008, District 20
Party	Candidate	Votes	%	±%
Republican	Jeanie Riddle	2,029	65.16%	
Republican	Tom Scheppers	1,085	34.84%	

Missouri House of Representatives Election, November 4, 2008, District 20
Party	Candidate	Votes	%	±%
Republican	Jeanie Riddle	10,228	63.00%	+2.20
Democratic	David Moen	6,008	37.00%	−2.20

Missouri House of Representatives Election, November 2, 2010, District 20
Party	Candidate	Votes	%	±%
Republican	Jeanie Riddle	9,838	100.00%	+37.00

Missouri House of Representatives Election, November 6, 2012, District 49
Party	Candidate	Votes	%	±%
Republican	Jeanie Riddle	10,314	70.20%	−29.80
Democratic	Pamela (Pam) Murray	4,378	29.80%	+29.80

=== State Senate ===
Missouri Senate Primary Election, August 5, 2014, District 10
Party	Candidate	Votes	%	±%
Republican	Jeanie Riddle	17,503	100.00%	

Missouri Senate Election, November 4, 2014, District 10
Party	Candidate	Votes	%	±%
Republican	Jeanie Riddle	28,871	67.57%	+67.57
Democratic	Ed Schieffer	13,856	32.43%	−43.95

Missouri Senate Election, November 6, 2018, District 10
Party	Candidate	Votes	%	±%
Republican	Jeanie Riddle	48,322	70.30%	+2.73
Democratic	Ayanna Shivers	20,412	29.70%	−2.73
