= Judy Berkstresser =

American politician

Judy Berkstresser is a former American Republican politician who served in the Missouri House of Representatives.

She graduated from Crane High School and attended the College of the Ozarks. She has worked as a cosmetologist, the owner of a beef cattle operation, the owner and operator of a dairy farm, and as a real state appraiser.
