= Curtis Trent =

American politician (1983)

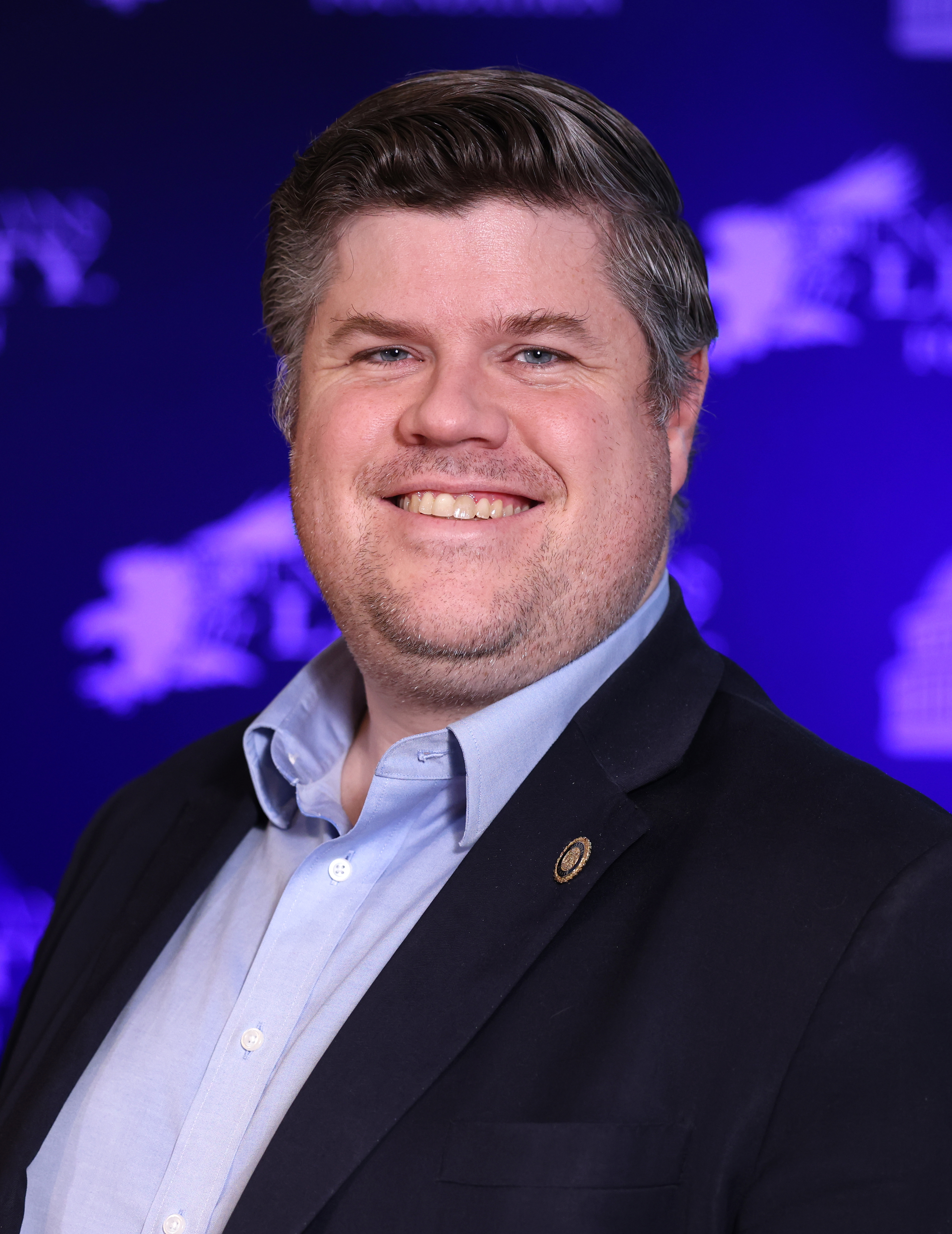
- Trent at the 2024 Hazlitt Summit hosted by Young Americans for Liberty Foundation

Member of the Missouri Senate from the 20th district
- Incumbent
- Assumed office January 4, 2023
- Preceded by: Eric Burlison
- Succeeded by: Lori Rook (elect)

Member of the Missouri House of Representatives from the 133rd district
- In office January 4, 2017 – January 4, 2023
- Preceded by: Eric Burlison
- Succeeded by: Melanie Stinnett

Personal details
- Born: July 4, 1983 (age 43) Springfield, Missouri, U.S.
- Party: Republican

Curtis Trent (born July 4, 1983) is an American politician who served in the Missouri House of Representatives from the 133rd district from 2017 to 2023, and is now serving in the Missouri Senate from District 20. Trent was defeated by Lori Rook in the 2026 primary.

== Electoral history ==
=== State representative ===
Missouri House of Representatives Primary Election, August 2, 2016, district 133
Party	Candidate	Votes	%
Republican	Curtis Trent	1,913	41.07%
Republican	Mike Goodart	1,029	22.09%
Republican	Matthew Sims	918	19.71%
Republican	David Cort	798	17.13%
Total votes		4,658	100.00%

Missouri House of Representatives Election, November 8, 2016, District 133
Party	Candidate	Votes	%
Republican	Curtis Trent	12,368	68.30%
Democratic	Jim Clemmons	5,741	31.70%
Total votes		18,109	100.00%

Missouri House of Representatives Election, November 6, 2018, district 133
Party	Candidate	Votes	%	±%
Republican	Curtis Trent	10,530	64.36%	−3.94
Democratic	Cindy Slimp	5,831	35.64%	+3.94
Total votes		16,361	100.00%	

Missouri House of Representatives Election, November 3, 2020, district 133
Party	Candidate	Votes	%	±%
Republican	Curtis Trent	13,037	65.05%	+0.69
Democratic	Cindy Slimp	7,005	34.95%	−0.69
Total votes		20,042	100.00%	

=== State Senate ===
Missouri Senate Primary Election, August 2, 2022, District 20
Party	Candidate	Votes	%
Republican	Curtis Trent	16,106	58.44%
Republican	Brian Gelner	11,452	41.56%
Total votes		27,558	100.00%

Missouri Senate General Election, November 8, 2022, District 20
Party	Candidate	Votes	%
Republican	Curtis Trent	54,504	100.00%
