= Larry Rohrbach =

American politician

Larry Rohrbach (born November 12, 1946, in California, Missouri) is an American former Republican politician who served in the Missouri Senate and the Missouri House of Representatives where he rose to the level of House Assistant Minority Floor Leader.

Rohrbach graduated from the California, Missouri, public school system and from Central Missouri State University with a bachelor's degree in agribusiness. He has worked as a farmer and has served in the U.S. Army from 1968 until 1970. In 2014, Rohrbach announced his retirement from Missouri politics after 32 years in Jefferson City, Missouri. After retiring from the state senate in 2002, he joined a then newly-founded lobbying firm.
