= John Dering =

John Dering may refer to:

- John Dering (MP for New Romney), represented New Romney (UK Parliament constituency)
- John Dering (MP for Southampton) in 1397

== See also ==
- John Dering Nettleton
