= Steve Stoll (politician) =

American politician and educator

Member of the Missouri Public Service Commission
- In office January 24, 2013 – December 13, 2017
- Governor: Jay Nixon

Member of the Missouri Senate
- In office 1998–2004

Member of the Missouri House of Representatives
- In office 1992–1998

Personal details
- Born: Stephen Stoll; April 3, 1947 (age 79) St. Louis, Missouri
- Party: Democratic
- Education: University of Missouri (BA); University of Missouri–St. Louis (MEd)

Stephen Stoll (born April 3, 1947) is an American politician and educator from the state of Missouri. He served 12 years in the Missouri General Assembly.

== Early life and education ==
Stoll was born in St. Louis and raised in Jefferson County. He attended Catholic Schools in Festus and attended Southeast Missouri State University. In 1970 he received a Bachelor of Arts degree in political science from the University of Missouri in Columbia, Missouri. He served in the United States Army from 1971 to 1973 and graduated from the University of Missouri–St. Louis in 1979 with a Master of Education. Following graduation, he worked as a classroom teacher for nearly 20 years.

== Career ==
Stoll's political career began with his election to a part-time position on the Crystal City City Council in 1983. He served on the City Council until his election to the Missouri House of Representatives in 1992. He was re-elected to the Missouri House in 1994 and 1996. In 1998, he was elected to the Missouri Senate. He was re-elected to his senate seat in 2002. In 2004, Stoll sought election to the United States House of Representatives to replace retiring Representative Dick Gephardt. Stoll placed third in a ten-candidate Democratic primary election, losing to the eventual winner, Russ Carnahan. In 2005, Stoll retired from his Senate seat and took a position as City Administrator for the city of Festus, Missouri.

After serving as city administrator for four years, Stoll was named Director of Administration for Jefferson County, Missouri. The County was beginning the transition from a Commission to a Charter form of government and he became the first director under the Jefferson County Home Rule Charter.

In December 2011, then-Missouri Governor Jay Nixon appointed Stoll to serve as one of five commissioners on the Missouri Public Service Commission. Because the appointment was made in the interim between legislative sessions, it fell under a 30-day deadline for confirmation when the Senate convened in regular session in January 2012. A second vacancy on the commission resulted in the appointment being delayed when lawmakers expressed their desire to have both positions filled simultaneously.

Stoll's appointment was withdrawn and resubmitted by Nixon after the General Assembly session adjourned in May 2012. On January 24, 2013, Stoll's appointment to the PSC was confirmed by a unanimous vote of the Missouri Senate. Stoll's term on the commission expired on December 13, 2017.

== Sources ==
- Biography from Missouri Senate
- Appearances on C-SPAN
