= Rudy Veit =

American politician

Member of the Missouri House of Representatives from the 59th district
- Incumbent
- Assumed office 2019
- Preceded by: Mike Bernskoetter

Personal details
- Born: August 16, 1953 (age 72) Jefferson City, Missouri, U.S.
- Party: Republican
- Profession: lawyer

Rudolph L. Veit (born August 16, 1953) is an American politician. He is a member of the Missouri House of Representatives from the 59th District, serving since 2019. He is a member of the Republican party.

== Electoral history ==
Missouri House of Representatives Primary Election, August 7, 2018, District 59
Party	Candidate	Votes	%	±%
Republican	Rudy Veit	3,671	50.52%	
Republican	Karen Leydens	1,899	26.13%	
Republican	Rik Combs	1,225	16.86%	
Republican	Randy Dinwiddie	251	3.45%	
Republican	Kendra Lane	221	3.04%	
Total votes		7,267	100.00%	

Missouri House of Representatives Election, November 6, 2018, District 59
Party	Candidate	Votes	%	±%
Republican	Rudy Veit	11,863	75.88%	
Democratic	Linda Ellen Greeson	3,770	24.12%	
Total votes		15,663	100.00%	

Missouri House of Representatives Election, November 3, 2020, District 59
Party	Candidate	Votes	%	±%
Republican	Rudy Veit	16,649	100.00%	+24.12
Total votes		16,649	100.00%	

Missouri House of Representatives Primary Election, August 2, 2022, District 59
Party	Candidate	Votes	%	±%
Republican	Rudy Veit	4,905	63.78%	
Republican	George Bacon	2,786	36.22%	
Total votes		7,691	100.00%	

Missouri House of Representatives Election, November 8, 2022, District 59
Party	Candidate	Votes	%	±%
Republican	Rudy Veit	13,613	100.00%	0.00
Total votes		13,613	100.00%	
