= Mary Elizabeth Coleman =

American politician

Member of the Missouri Senate from the 22nd district
- Incumbent
- Assumed office January 4, 2023
- Preceded by: Paul Wieland

Member of the Missouri House of Representatives from the 97th district
- In office January 9, 2019 – January 4, 2023
- Preceded by: Mike Revis
- Succeeded by: David Casteel

Personal details
- Party: Republican
- Spouse: Chris Coleman
- Children: 6
- Education: Saint Louis University (BS); St. Mary's University, Texas (JD)

Mary Elizabeth Coleman is an American politician, attorney, and anti-abortion activist from Arnold, Missouri. She has served in the Missouri Senate since 2023, representing the 22nd district. Coleman was previously a state representative from 2019 to 2023 and a Arnold city councilwoman from 2013 to 2015.

On January 5, 2023, Coleman announced that she would be a candidate for Missouri's 3rd District in the United States House of Representatives in 2024. On March 26, 2024, Coleman withdrew from that race and instead joined the crowded 2024 Republican primary for Missouri Secretary of State. In March 2025, Coleman said she would not run for re-election at the end of her term in the Missouri Senate in 2027.

== Early life and education ==
Coleman was raised in Georgetown, Texas. She earned a Bachelor of Science in Business Administration from Saint Louis University and a Juris Doctor from St. Mary's University School of Law.

== Career ==
From 2007 to 2009, Coleman worked as an associate at Oppenheimer, Blend, Harrison and Tate. She was then a member of the Arnold, Missouri City Council. Coleman operated an independent law firm from 2009 to 2015 and joined TuckerAllen in 2015. Coleman has also worked for the Thomas More Society, a Pro-Life law firm.

=== Arnold City Council ===
On April 2, 2013, Coleman won an open seat on the Arnold City Council, representing the 2nd ward. Her term began on April 11. She did not run for re-election in 2015.

=== Missouri House of Representatives ===
In March 2018, Coleman announced her campaign for the Missouri House of Representatives in the 97th district. The seat was considered competitive after Democrat Mike Revis narrowly flipped it from the Republicans in a February 2018 special election.

In the House, Coleman served as chair of the House Children and Families Committee. In December 2021, Coleman introduced a bill that would ban abortion in Missouri after eight weeks, modeled after the Texas Heartbeat Act. In 2022, Coleman proposed that Missouri women who leave the state to get an abortion should be prohibited from doing so, and introduced a provision to allow private citizens to sue anyone they suspect aided an out of state abortion.

=== Missouri Senate ===
In February 2021, Coleman declared her candidacy for a seat in the Missouri Senate. She came in first place against three opponents in the Republican primary, and then won the general election of 2022.

In 2024, Coleman reinstated "ballot candy" provisions to a bill that would add barriers to citizen-initiated constitutional amendments. The provisions were previously removed in bipartisan negotiations in which the language was criticized by Democrats as "deceptive" and "unnecessary" while Republicans described it a means of being inclusive of rural voters.

In May 2025, Coleman opposed legislation establishing tax credit assistance for childcare, an issue identified as a priority by both preceding and current governors Mike Parson and Mike Kehoe. She stalled action on the measure by reading Little House on the Prairie out loud on the senate floor, leading it to being pulled from consideration.

Missouri Senate Primary Election, August 2, 2022, district 22
Party	Candidate	Votes	%	±%
Republican	Mary Elizabeth Coleman	7,615	34.86%	
Republican	Jeff Roorda	5,246	24.02%	
Republican	Dan Shaul	5,095	23.33%	
Republican	Shane Roden	3,886	17.79%	
Total votes		21,842	100.00%	

Missouri Senate Election, November 8, 2022, district 22
Party	Candidate	Votes	%	±%
Republican	Mary Elizabeth Coleman	40,695	65.48%	
Democratic	Benjamin Hagin	21,456	34.52%	
Total votes		62,151	100.00%	

== Personal life ==
Coleman is Catholic. She is married with six children, including two who are adopted. Her husband Chris is an accountant.
