= Danny Staples (politician) =

American politician

Danny Lew Staples (April 1, 1932 – July 22, 2003) was a Missouri politician and former state senator from Eminence, Missouri. He served for 20 years in the Missouri Senate (1983-2003) and 6 years in the Missouri House (1976-1982). Before becoming a politician, Stapes was a truck driver. During his career in the state senate, he chaired committees for the Missouri state transportation and prison systems.

== Personal life ==
Danny Staples was married to Barbara Staples. He had 2 children from a previous marriage, Robin and Richard. Barbara had 3 children from a previous marriage, Jeannine, Janet, and Joe.
