= Mike Bernskoetter =

American politician

Member of the Missouri Senate from the 6th district
- Incumbent
- Assumed office January 9, 2019
- Preceded by: Mike Kehoe
- Succeeded by: Jake Vogel (elect)

Member of the Missouri House of Representatives from the 59th district
- In office January 5, 2011 – January 9, 2019
- Succeeded by: Rudy Veit

Personal details
- Born: November 29, 1959 (age 66) Jefferson City, Missouri
- Party: Republican
- Spouse: Jeannette
- Children: 4
- Profession: pest control/businessman

Mike Bernskoetter (born November 29, 1959) is an American politician. He is a member of the Missouri Senate from the 6th district, serving since 2019. He previously represented the 59th district in the Missouri House of Representatives from 2011 to 2019. He is a member of the Republican Party.

In 2025, Bernskoetter sponsored legislation to rescind paid sick leave and a provision that requires the minimum wage to be indexed to inflation. The paid sick leave and minimum wage provisions were passed in a November 2024 ballot initiative by Missouri voters.

== Electoral history ==
=== State representative ===
Missouri House of Representatives Primary Election, August 3, 2010, District 113
Party	Candidate	Votes	%	±%
Republican	Mike Bernskoetter	3,960	63.61%	
Republican	Dan Klindt	2,265	36.39%	
Total votes		6,225	100	

Missouri House of Representatives Election, November 2, 2010, District 113
Party	Candidate	Votes	%	±%
Republican	Mike Bernskoetter	7,744	63.93%	+2.44
Democratic	Cyrus (Cy) Dashtaki	4,369	36.07%	−2.44
Total votes		12,113	100	

Missouri House of Representatives Election, November 6, 2012, District 59
Party	Candidate	Votes	%	±%
Republican	Mike Bernskoetter	13,406	80.58%	+16.65
Democratic	Vonnieta E. Trickey	3,230	19.42%	−16.65
Total votes		16,636	100	

Missouri House of Representatives Election, November 4, 2014, District 59
Party	Candidate	Votes	%	±%
Republican	Mike Bernskoetter	8,824	88.51%	+7.93
Constitution	Michael Eberle	1,146	11.49%	+11.49
Total votes		9,970	100	

Missouri House of Representatives Primary Election, August 2, 2016, District 59
Party	Candidate	Votes	%	±%
Republican	Mike Bernskoetter	6,643	87.32%	
Republican	Randy Dinwiddie	965	12.68%	
Total votes		7,608	100	

Missouri House of Representatives Election, November 8, 2016, District 59
Party	Candidate	Votes	%	±%
Republican	Mike Bernskoetter	15,864	100.00%	+12.68
Total votes		15,864	100	

=== State Senate ===
Missouri Senate Election, November 6, 2018, District 6
Party	Candidate	Votes	%	±%
Republican	Mike Bernskoetter	53,004	73.25%	−5.83
Democratic	Nicole Thompson	17,808	24.61%	+3.69
Libertarian	Steven Wilson	1,525	2.11%	+2.11
Write-In	Christina Smith	19	0.03%	+0.03
Total votes		72,356	100	

Missouri Senate Election, November 8, 2022, District 6
Party	Candidate	Votes	%	±%
Republican	Mike Bernskoetter	56,424	100.00%	+26.75%
Total votes		56,424	100.00%	
