= Shane Roden =

American politician

Member of the Missouri House of Representatives from the 111th district
- In office January 7, 2015 – January 4, 2023
- Preceded by: Michael Frame
- Succeeded by: Gary Bonacker

Personal details
- Born: March 5, 1983 (age 43) Franklin County, Missouri, U.S.
- Party: Republican

Shane Roden (born March 5, 1983) is an American politician who served in the Missouri House of Representatives, representing the 111th district from 2015 to 2023.
