= Lisa Thomas =

American politician and psychiatrist

Member of the Missouri House of Representatives
- In office January 6, 2021 – January 8, 2025
- Preceded by: Rocky Miller
- Succeeded by: Jeff Vernetti
- Constituency: 124th district (2021–2023); 123rd district (2023–2025)

Personal details
- Party: Republican
- Education: Washington University in St. Louis (BA, MA); University of Missouri (MD)

Lisa Thomas is an American politician and psychiatrist who served as a member of the Missouri House of Representatives from 2021 to 2025. Elected in November 2020 from district 124, she assumed office on January 6, 2021. After redistricting in 2022, she was reelected from district 123. She was defeated in the Republican Primary election on August 6, 2024.

== Education ==
Thomas earned a Bachelor of Arts degree in biology and psychology and Master of Arts in clinical psychology from the Washington University in St. Louis, followed by a Doctor of Medicine from the University of Missouri School of Medicine.

== Career ==
Thomas worked as a psychiatrist at the Harry S. Truman Memorial Veterans' Hospital until 2016. She is the part-time medical director of the Missouri Physicians Health Program. Thomas was elected to the Missouri House of Representatives in November 2020 and assumed office on January 6, 2021.

== Electoral history ==
=== State representative ===
Missouri House of Representatives Primary Election, November 2, 2020, District 124
Party	Candidate	Votes	%	±%
Republican	Lisa Thomas	2,304	31.07%	
Republican	Benny Earl Thomas	1,944	26.21%	
Republican	Luke Hagedorn	1,515	20.43%	
Republican	Duell Wayne Lauderdale	1,401	18.89%	
Republican	Bernie Mowinski	252	3.40%	
Total votes		7,416	100.00%	

Missouri House of Representatives Election, November 3, 2020, District 124
Party	Candidate	Votes	%	±%
Republican	Lisa Thomas	17,736	100.00%	
Total votes		17,736	100.00%	

Missouri House of Representatives Election, November 8, 2022, District 123
Party	Candidate	Votes	%	±%
Republican	Lisa Thomas	13,903	100.00%	0.00
Total votes		13,903	100.00%	
