= Bryan Spencer =

American politician (born 1967)

Member of the Missouri House of Representatives from the 63rd district
- In office January 2013 – January 2021
- Preceded by: Tishaura Jones
- Succeeded by: Richard West

Personal details
- Born: September 25, 1967 (age 58) Rolla, Missouri, U.S.
- Party: Republican
- Profession: teacher

Bryan Spencer (born September 25, 1967) is an American politician. He was a member of the Missouri House of Representatives from 2013 to 2021. He is a member of the Republican Party.

== Election results ==
Missouri House of Representatives — District 63 — St. Charles County (2016)
Party	Candidate	Votes	%	±%
Republican	Bryan Spencer	12,588	70.49%	+1.86
Democratic	Liz Gratta	5,269	29.51%	−1.86

Missouri House of Representatives — District 63 — St. Charles County (2014)
Party	Candidate	Votes	%	±%
Republican	Bryan Spencer	5,734	68.63%	+5.26
Democratic	Bryan Pinette	2,621	31.37%	−5.26

Missouri House of Representatives — District 63 — St. Charles County (2012)
Party	Candidate	Votes	%	±%
Republican	Bryan Spencer	8,928	63.37%	
Democratic	Bill Stinson	5,161	36.63%	
