= Tricia Byrnes (politician) =

American politician

Member of the Missouri House of Representatives from the 63rd district
- Incumbent
- Assumed office January 4, 2023
- Preceded by: Richard West

Personal details
- Party: Republican
- Education: Southeast Missouri State University; Lindenwood University
- Occupation: Real estate agent
- Website: triciabyrnes.com

Tricia K. Byrnes is an American politician serving as a Republican member of the Missouri House of Representatives, representing the state's 63rd House district. In 2026, Byrnes is running to represent Missouri's 10th Senate district.

== Education ==
Byrnes is a graduate of Francis Howell High School and received a bachelor's degree in Mass Communication/Media Studies from Southeast Missouri State University and a master's degree in education from Lindenwood University.
