= Travis Fitzwater =

American politician (born 1981)

Member of the Missouri Senate from the 10th district
- In office 2023 – May 15, 2026
- Preceded by: Jeanie Riddle
- Succeeded by: Mike Deering (elect)

Member of the Missouri House of Representatives from the 49th district
- In office 2015–2023
- Preceded by: Jeanie Riddle
- Succeeded by: Jim Schulte

Personal details
- Born: May 22, 1981 (age 45) Cleveland, Ohio, U.S.
- Party: Republican
- Spouse: Amy
- Children: 3
- Profession: Association Executive, Business Owner

Travis Fitzwater (born May 22, 1981) is an American politician. He is a served as a member of the Missouri Senate from 2023 to 2026, and a former member of the Missouri House of Representatives, having served in the House from 2015 to 2023. He is a member of the Republican Party. He resigned from the Missouri Senate in May 2026 in order to lead the Missouri Technology Corporation.

== Electoral history ==
=== State representative ===
Missouri House of Representatives Election, November 4, 2014, District 49
Party	Candidate	Votes	%	±%
Republican	Travis Fitzwater	5,568	61.98%	−8.22
Democratic	Gracia Yancey Backer	3,416	38.02%	+8.22
Total votes		8,984	100.00%	

Missouri House of Representatives Election, November 8, 2016, District 49
Party	Candidate	Votes	%	±%
Republican	Travis Fitzwater	13,366	100.00%	+38.02
Total votes		13,366	100.00%	

Missouri House of Representatives Election, November 6, 2018, District 49
Party	Candidate	Votes	%	±%
Republican	Travis Fitzwater	9,383	67.19%	−32.81
Democratic	Lisa Buhr	4,581	32.81%	+32.81
Total votes		13,964	100.00%	

Missouri House of Representatives Election, November 3, 2020, District 49
Party	Candidate	Votes	%	±%
Republican	Travis Fitzwater	14,881	100.00%	+32.81
Total votes		14,881	100.00%	

=== State Senate ===
Missouri Senate Primary Election, August 2, 2022, District 10
Party	Candidate	Votes	%	±%
Republican	Travis Fitzwater	7,625	31.46%	
Republican	Mike (Michael) Carter	6,948	28.67%	
Republican	Bryan Spencer	5,493	22.66%	
Republican	Jeff Porter	3,343	13.79%	
Republican	Joshua Price	827	3.41%	
Total votes		24,236	100.00%	

Missouri Senate Election, November 8, 2022, District 10
Party	Candidate	Votes	%	±%
Republican	Travis Fitzwater	44,169	77.63%	
Libertarian	Catherine Dreher	12,728	22.37%	
Total votes		56,897	100.00%	
