= Missouri Democratic Party =

Missouri affiliate of the Democratic Party

- Chairperson: Russ Carnahan
- Senate leader: Doug Beck
- House leader: Ashley Aune
- Headquarters: Kansas City, MO
- National affiliation: Democratic Party
- Colors: Blue
- Seats in the Missouri Senate: 10 / 34
- Seats in the Missouri House of Representatives: 52 / 163
- U.S. House of Representatives: 2 / 8

Election symbol

Website
- www.missouridemocrats.org

The Missouri Democratic Party is the affiliate of the Democratic Party in the U.S. state of Missouri. Its chair is Russ Carnahan, the vice chair is Yvonne Reeves-Chong, the treasurer is Glenda Bainbridge, and the secretary is Joshua Dunne.

Although the party was in the majority in state government as recently as the 1990s, the rival Republican Party has since substantially overtaken it. As a result of the 2022 Missouri elections, the Democratic Party controls none of Missouri's statewide offices for the first time since Reconstruction.

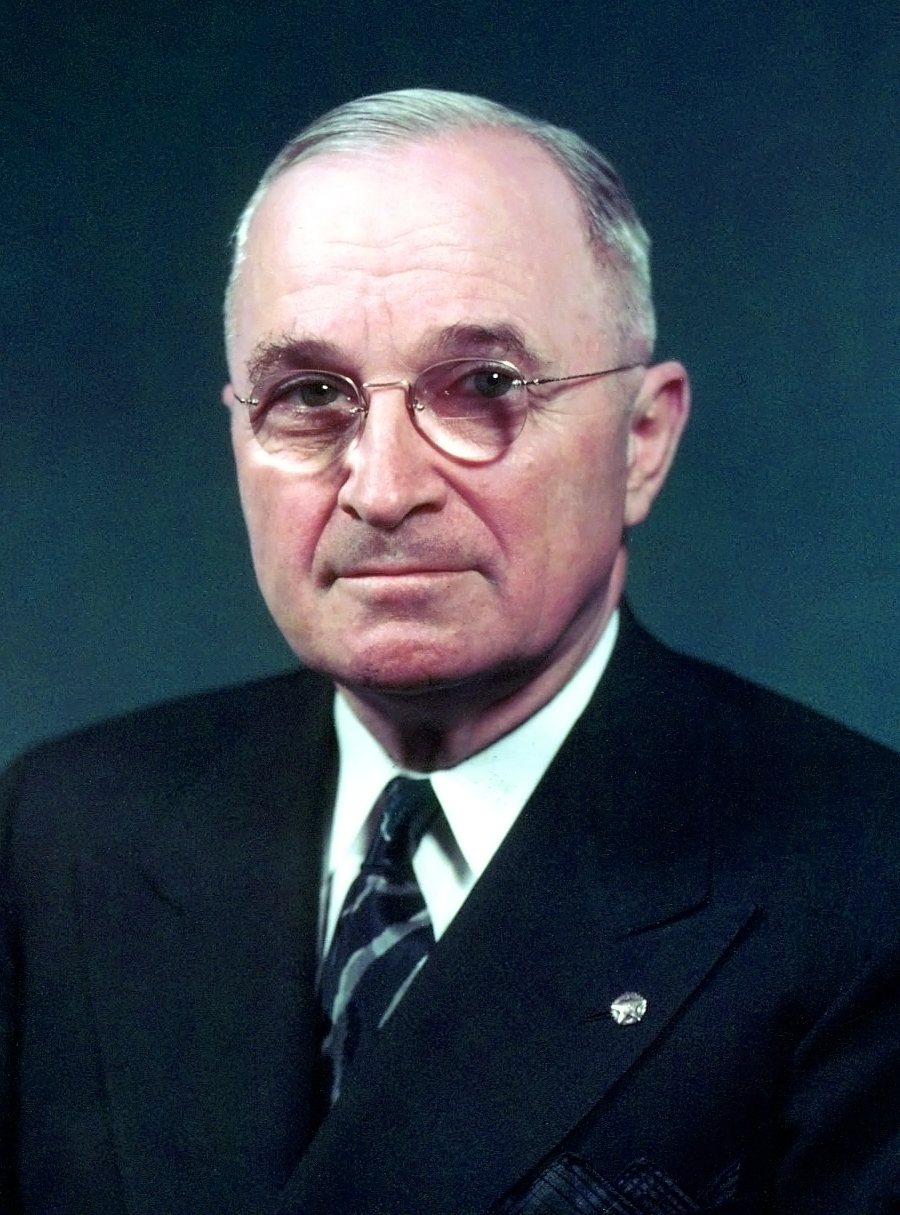
President Harry S. Truman (1945−1953)

== History ==
=== 20th century ===
The Missouri Democratic Party politics were characterized by diverse cultural, economic and social issues which led to antagonism between two party factions in the 1920s. The conflicts, mainly due to the dysfunctional relationship between Senator Jim Reed and President Woodrow Wilson, led to a disruption for the Missouri Democratic Party, degrading the party to minority status throughout most of the 1920s.

The dispute was over whether the US should join the League of Nations or not. Reed strongly opposed this while President Wilson was a strong supporter of it. This question led to debate in many states but none was so affected as Missouri. President Wilson wanted to form a strong national leadership, while Reed wanted more state control. Despite most Missourian Democrats favoring entrance to the organization, Reed remained firm in his stand, which caused some state Democrats to create their own pro-League club called "The Missouri State Democratic Club". Among the supporters for Reed were mainly Irish immigrants settled in the urban part of Missouri. The supporters for the President mainly resided in the more rural parts of the state.

Another big issue within Democratic politics was the prohibition issue. In the state of Missouri, wet candidates tended to win office, although dry candidates were found both in the Democratic and the Republican party. Republicans managed to agree to a higher degree than Democrats on a wet stand, which might be one of the reasons why they managed to win all of the presidential and gubernatorial elections during the 1920s. The African-American part of the state population, who earlier had favored the GOP, for the most part switched sides in the beginning of the 1930s. This was partly caused by the Democratic Party's 1928 backing of Joseph L. McLemore for Congress, making it the first ever nomination of an African-American for Congress. Also contributing to the change was the Republicans' inability to handle the Great Depression. During the phase-out of the party bosses, power moved from Kansas City to St. Louis, which had been a Democratic city since 1933.

Harry S. Truman is probably the most influential person in the history of the Missouri Democratic Party. Truman played an important role in Missouri politics after the depression in 1929. He was one of the main beneficiaries of the powerful Tom Pendergast organization. The backing of the organization helped Truman secure Missouri's senator seat in the 1932 election. Truman later on, in 1944, got elected vice president to Franklin D. Roosevelt. After Roosevelt's death Missouri got its first President. Truman remained in the seat even after the 1948 election, given a large support from his home state. Especially the African-American part of the population, appreciative of Roosevelt's New Deal and Truman's Fair Deal program, stayed loyal to the Democratic Party.

=== 21st century ===
In the 2010 elections, the Missouri Democratic Party won three of the nine House of Representatives districts. That is a loss of one seat compared to the 2008 House of Representative elections. On a national level Missouri is known as a swing state. The voters of Missouri have voted against the eventual winner four times in the presidential elections, favoring Adlai Stevenson over Dwight Eisenhower in 1956, John McCain over Barack Obama in 2008, Mitt Romney over Barack Obama in 2012 and Donald Trump over Joe Biden in 2020.

In 2023, former Missouri Congressman Russ Carnahan became the Chair of the Missouri Democratic Party, replacing Michael Butler.

The Missouri Democratic Party has seen some policy success in the state in recent years, with 2020 Missouri Amendment 2 expanding Medicaid and 2024 Missouri Amendment 3 ensuring legal access to abortion.

== Current Democratic officeholders ==
The Missouri Democratic Party holds none of the six statewide offices, none of the state's U.S. Senate seats and two of the state's eight U.S. House seats.

=== Legislative Leadership ===
- Senate Minority Leader: Doug Beck
- Senate Assistant Minority Floor Leader: Steven Roberts
- Senate Minority Caucus Chair: Angela Mosley
- Senate Minority Caucus Whip: Brian Williams
- House Minority Leader: Ashley Aune
- Assistant House Minority Floor Leader: Marlon Anderson
- House Minority Whip: Aaron Crossley
- House Minority Caucus Chair: Emily Weber
- House Minority Caucus Vice-Chair: Kimberly-Ann Collins
- House Minority Caucus Secretary: Eric Woods
- House Minority Policy Chair: Bridget Walsh Moore

Nicole Galloway was the last elected statewide Democrat, elected as State Auditor of Missouri.

=== Federal ===
- U.S. Senate
  - None

Both of Missouri's U.S. Senate seats have been held by Republicans since 2019. Claire McCaskill was the last Democrat to represent Missouri in the U.S. Senate.

==== U.S. House of Representatives ====
Out of the eight seats Missouri has in the U.S. House of Representatives, two are held by Democrats, both of whom are African American:

District	Member	Photo
1st	Wesley Bell	
2nd	Fred Wellman (elect)	
5th	Emanuel Cleaver	

==== Mayors ====
- Kansas City: Quinton Lucas (1)
- St. Louis: Cara Spencer (2)
- Columbia: Barbara Buffaloe

== Election results ==
=== Federal ===
==== U.S. House ====
Election	Votes	%	Seats (MO)	±	%
2016	1,041,306	37.86	2 / 8	0	1.85
2018	1,027,969	42.51	2 / 8	0	4.65
2020	1,172,135	39.42	2 / 8	0	3.09
2022	794,978	38.59	2 / 8	0	0.83
2024	1,125,671	38.49	2 / 8	0	0.10
2026	1,008,238	48.21	3 / 8	▲1	9.72

=== State ===
==== Executive offices ====
Governor
Election	Candidate	Votes	%	Result
1960	John M. Dalton	1,095,200	58.03%	Won ✓
1964	Warren E. Hearnes	1,110,651	62.06%	Won ✓
1968	Warren E. Hearnes	1,072,805	60.80%	Won ✓
1972	Edward L. Dowd	832,751	44.64%	Lost ✗
1976	Joseph Teasdale	971,184	50.23%	Won ✓
1980	Joseph Teasdale	981,884	47.02%	Lost ✗
1984	Ken Rothman	913,700	43.34%	Lost ✗
1988	Betty Cooper Hearnes	724,919	34.75%	Lost ✗
1992	Mel Carnahan	1,375,425	58.68%	Won ✓
1996	Mel Carnahan	1,224,801	57.17%	Won ✓
2000	Bob Holden	1,152,752	49.12%	Won ✓
2004	Claire McCaskill	1,301,442	47.85%	Lost ✗
2008	Jay Nixon	1,680,661	58.40%	Won ✓
2012	Jay Nixon	1,494,056	54.77%	Won ✓
2016	Chris Koster	1,277,360	45.57%	Lost ✗
2020	Nicole Galloway	1,225,771	40.69%	Lost ✗
2024	Crystal Quade	1,146,173	38.72%	Lost ✗

== See also ==
- Political party strength in Missouri
