= Missouri Republican Party =

Missouri affiliate of the Republican Party

- Chairperson: Peter Kinder
- Governor: Mike Kehoe
- Lieutenant Governor: David Wasinger
- Senate President (pro tempore): Cindy O'Laughlin
- House Speaker: Jonathan Patterson
- Headquarters: Jefferson City, Missouri
- Ideology: Conservatism
- National affiliation: Republican Party
- Colors: Red
- U.S. Senate Seats: 2 / 2
- U.S. House Seats: 6 / 8
- Statewide Executive Offices: 6 / 6
- Seats in the Missouri Senate: 24 / 34
- Seats in the Missouri House of Representatives: 111 / 163

Election symbol

Website
- www.missouri.gop

The Missouri Republican Party is the affiliate of the United States Republican Party in Missouri. Its chair is former lieutenant governor Peter Kinder, who was elected in February 2025. It is currently the dominant party in the state, controlling most of Missouri's U.S. House seats, both U.S. Senate seats, both houses of the state legislature, and all statewide offices, including the governorship.

== History ==
Francis Preston Blair Jr. was the only Republican member of congress from a border state at the beginning of the American Civil War. However, he proposed that the state party instead merge with unionist Whigs and Democrats to form the Union Party.

Blair and other Unionists in Missouri supported the removal of John C. Frémont's military command and the rescinding of his emancipation order. However, B. Gratz Brown, the former chair, supported Frémont. Blair and Brown disagreed on gradual compensated emancipation and slave colonization with Blair in support and Brown in opposition.

The Radical Republicans, including Brown, held a separate convention in 1864. They sent an uncommitted delegation to the 1864 National Union National Convention which was seated. Brown wanted to send a delegation to Frémont's Radical Democratic convention. This delegation was the only one to vote against Lincoln.

The Radical wrote the state constitution in 1865, which emancipated slaves while Blair returned to the Democratic Party.

Members of the party left to form the Liberal Republican Party. Brown, their gubernatorial nominee, won the 1870 election.

After around 58% of Missouri voters approved November 2024 Proposition A to introduce a Missouri law to mandate that most employers are to provide sick leave to employees and also raise the minimum wage in line with inflation, Missouri's Republican lawmakers responded in May 2025 by repealing those portions of Proposition A, pending governor approval.

== Current Republican officeholders ==
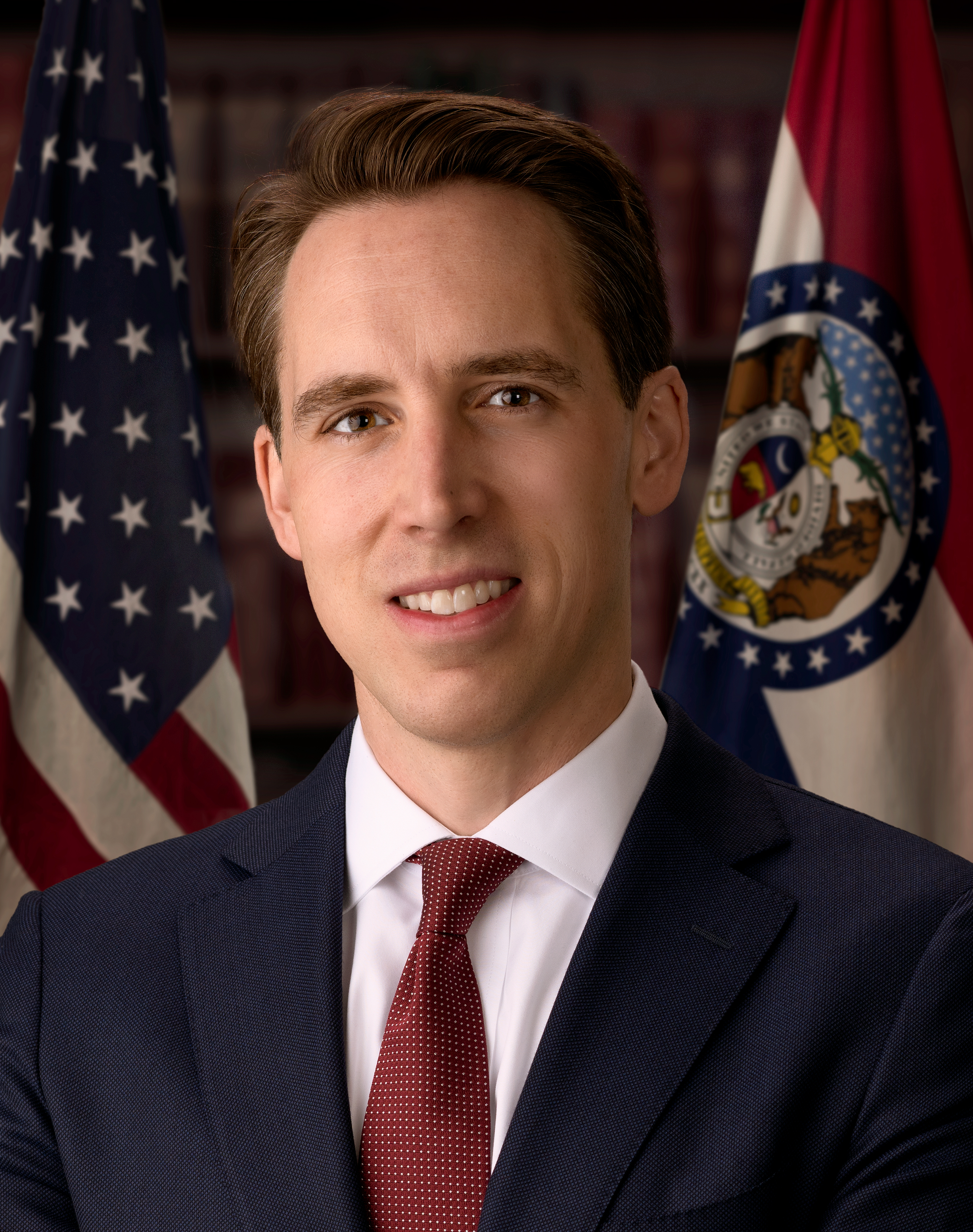
Senior U.S. Senator Josh Hawley

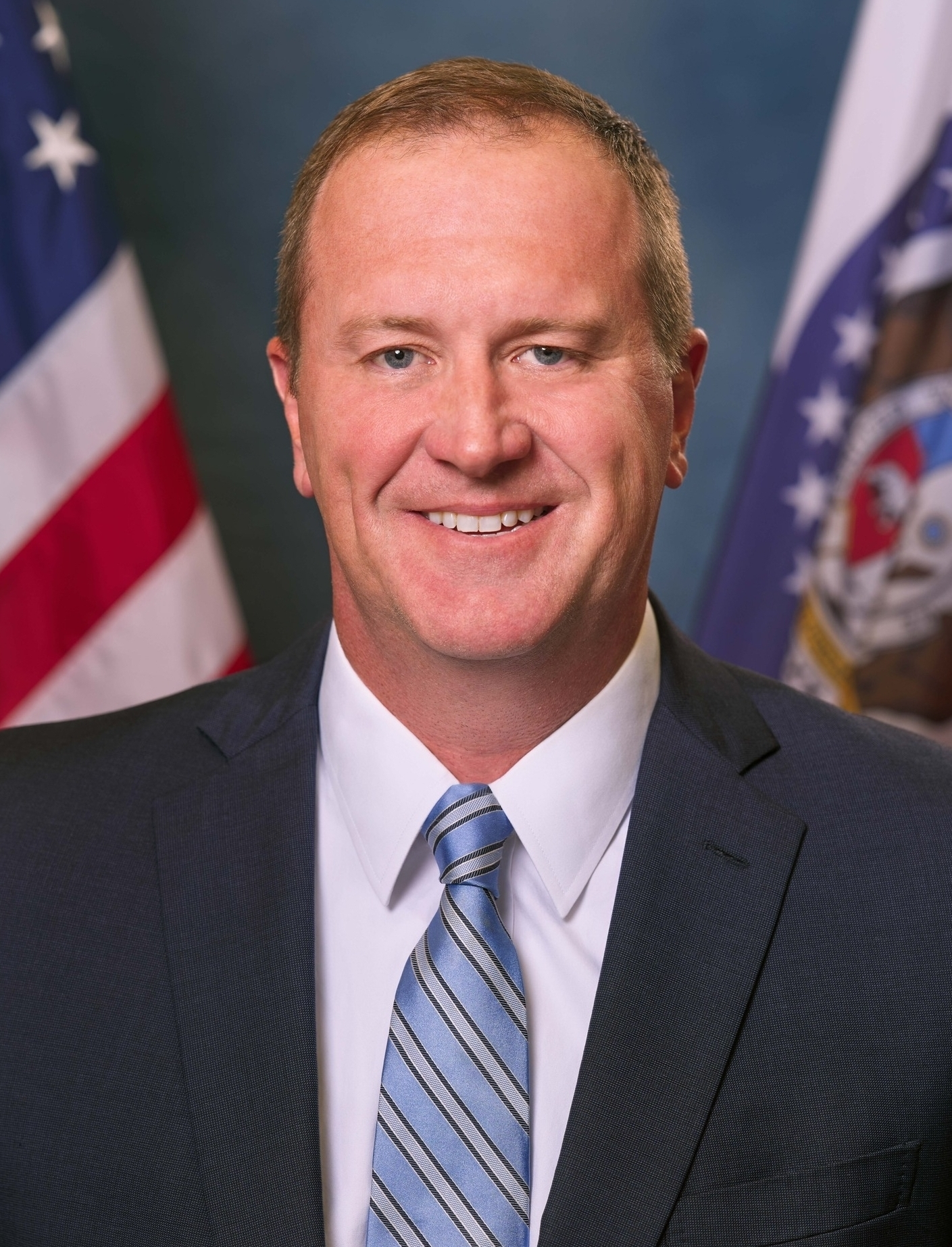
Junior U.S. Senator Eric Schmitt

=== Members of Congress ===
==== U.S. Senate ====
- Josh Hawley
- Eric Schmitt

==== U.S. House of Representatives ====
District	Member	Photo
2nd	Ann Wagner	
3rd	Bob Onder	
4th	Mark Alford	
6th	Sam Graves	
6th	Chris Stigall (elect)	
7th	Eric Burlison	
8th	Jason Smith	

=== Statewide offices ===
- Governor: Mike Kehoe
- Lieutenant Governor: David Wasinger
- Attorney General: Catherine Hanaway
- Secretary of State: Denny Hoskins
- State Auditor: Scott Fitzpatrick
- State Treasurer: Vivek Malek

== Works cited ==
- Abbott, Richard (1986). The Republican Party and the South, 1855-1877: The First Southern Strategy. University of North Carolina Press. ISBN 0807816809.
