= Missouri Senate =

Upper chamber of the Missouri General Assembly

Coordinates: 38°34′44″N 92°10′22″W

- Missouri General Assembly

Type
- Type: Upper house
- Term limits: 2 terms (8 years)

History
- New session started: January 8, 2025

Leadership
- President: David Wasinger (R) since January 13, 2025
- President pro tempore: Cindy O'Laughlin (R) since January 8, 2025
- Majority Leader: Tony Luetkemeyer (R) since January 8, 2025
- Minority Leader: Doug Beck (D) since June 30, 2024

Structure
- Seats: 34
- Political groups: Majority: Republican (24); Minority: Democratic (10)
- Length of term: 4 years
- Authority: Article III, Missouri Constitution
- Salary: $35,915/year + per diem

Elections
- Last election: November 5, 2024 (17 seats)
- Next election: November 3, 2026 (17 seats)
- Redistricting: Legislative Control

Meeting place
- State Senate Chamber; Missouri State Capitol; Jefferson City, Missouri

Website
- Missouri Senate

Rules
- Senate Rules

The Missouri Senate is the upper chamber of the Missouri General Assembly, the lower chamber being the Missouri House of Representatives. It has 34 members, representing districts with an average population of 181,000. Its members serve four-year terms, with half the seats being up for election every two years. The Senate chooses a President Pro Tempore to serve in the absence of the lieutenant governor or when he shall have to exercise the office of governor of Missouri if there is a vacancy in that office due to death, resignation, impeachment, or incapacitation.

Members of the Missouri General Assembly are prohibited from serving more than eight years in either the state house of representatives or state senate, or a total of sixteen years, due to statutory term limits.

== Composition ==
After the 2024 general election the party representation in the Senate was:

Affiliation	Party (Shading indicates majority caucus)		Total	Vacant
Affiliation	Republican	Democratic	Total	Vacant
Current legislature	24	10	34	0
Latest voting share	70.6%	29.4%		

↓
24	10
Republican	Democratic

=== Officers ===
Position	Name	Party	District
Lieutenant Governor and President of the Senate	David Wasinger	Republican	Missouri
President pro tempore	Cindy O'Laughlin	Republican	18th – Shelbina
Majority Leader	Tony Luetkemeyer	Republican	34th – Parkville
Assistant Majority Leader	Curtis Trent	Republican	20th – Battlefield
Majority Caucus Chair	Ben Brown	Republican	26th – Washington
Majority Caucus Secretary	Sandy Crawford	Republican	28th – Buffalo
Majority Caucus Whip	Jill Carter	Republican	32nd – Granby
Minority Floor Leader	Doug Beck	Democratic	1st – Affton
Assistant Minority Floor Leader	Steven Roberts	Democratic	5th – St. Louis
Minority Caucus Chair	Angela Mosley	Democratic	13th – Florissant
Minority Caucus Whip	Brian Williams	Democratic	14th – University City

=== Members of the Missouri Senate ===
District	Name	Party	Residence	Start	Term Limited
1	Doug Beck	Democratic	Affton	2021	2029
2	Nick Schroer	Republican	Defiance	2023	2031
3	Mike Henderson	Republican	Desloge	2025	2033
4	Karla May	Democratic	St. Louis	2019	2027
5	Steve Roberts	Democratic	St. Louis	2021	2029
6	Mike Bernskoetter	Republican	Jefferson City	2019	2027
7	Patty Lewis	Democratic	Kansas City	2025	2033
8	Mike Cierpiot	Republican	Lee's Summit	2018 (Note: Elected in a special election.)	2027
9	Barbara Washington	Democratic	Kansas City	2021	2029
10	Vacant (Note: Republican Travis Fitzwater resigned on May 15, 2026)				
11	Joe Nicola	Republican	Grain Valley	2025	2033
12	Rusty Black	Republican	Chillicothe	2023	2031
13	Angela Mosley	Democratic	Florissant	2021	2029
14	Brian Williams	Democratic	University City	2019	2027
15	David Gregory	Republican	Chesterfield	2025	2033
16	Justin Brown	Republican	Rolla	2019	2027
17	Maggie Nurrenbern	Democratic	Kansas City	2025	2033
18	Cindy O'Laughlin	Republican	Shelbina	2019	2027
19	Stephen Webber	Democratic	Columbia	2025	2033
20	Curtis Trent	Republican	Battlefield	2023	2031
21	Kurtis Gregory	Republican	Marshall	2025	2033
22	Mary Elizabeth Coleman	Republican	Arnold	2023	2031
23	Adam Schnelting	Republican	St. Charles	2025	2033
24	Tracy McCreery	Democratic	Olivette	2023	2031
25	Jason Bean	Republican	Poplar Bluff	2021	2029
26	Ben Brown	Republican	Washington	2023	2031
27	Jamie Burger	Republican	Benton	2025	2033
28	Sandy Crawford	Republican	Buffalo	2017	2027
29	Mike Moon	Republican	Ash Grove	2021	2029
30	Lincoln Hough	Republican	Springfield	2019	2027
31	Rick Brattin	Republican	Lee's Summit	2021	2029
32	Jill Carter	Republican	Granby	2023	2031
33	Brad Hudson	Republican	Cape Fair	2025	2033
34	Tony Luetkemeyer	Republican	Parkville	2019	2027

== Committees ==
Under Rule 25 of the Senate Rules, all committees are appointed by the President Pro Tempore, who is currently Cindy O'Laughlin.

=== Standing committees ===
Committee	Chair	Vice-chair
Administration	Cindy O'Laughlin	Tony Luetkemeyer
Agriculture, Food Production and Outdoor Resources	Jason Bean	Jamie Burger
Appropriations	Rusty Black	Brad Hudson
Commerce, Consumer Protection, Energy and the Environment	Mike Cierpiot	Mike Henderson
Economic and Workforce Development	Ben Brown	Kurtis Gregory
Education	Rick Brattin	Brad Hudson
Emerging Issues and Professional Registration	Justin Brown	Jamie Burger
Families, Seniors and Health	Jill Carter	Joe Nicola
Fiscal Oversight	Mike Bernskoetter	Rusty Black
General Laws	Curtis Trent	Kurtis Gregory
Government Efficiency	Mary Elizabeth Coleman	Brad Hudson
Gubernatorial Appointments	Cindy O'Laughlin	Tony Luetkemeyer
Insurance and Banking	Sandy Crawford	David Gregory
Judiciary and Civil and Criminal Jurisprudence	Nick Schroer	David Gregory
Local Government, Elections and Pensions	Mike Henderson	Jamie Burger
Progress and Development	Brian Williams	Barbara Washington
Rules, Joint Rules, Resolutions and Ethics	Tony Luetkemeyer	Cindy O'Laughlin
Transportation, Infrastructure and Public Safety	Travis Fitzwater	Adam Schnelting
Veterans and Military Affairs	Mike Moon	Adam Schnelting

== See also ==
- Political party strength in Missouri
- Missouri House of Representatives
- Missouri Constitution
