= Missouri's 32nd Senate district =

American legislative district

Missouri's 32nd State Senate district
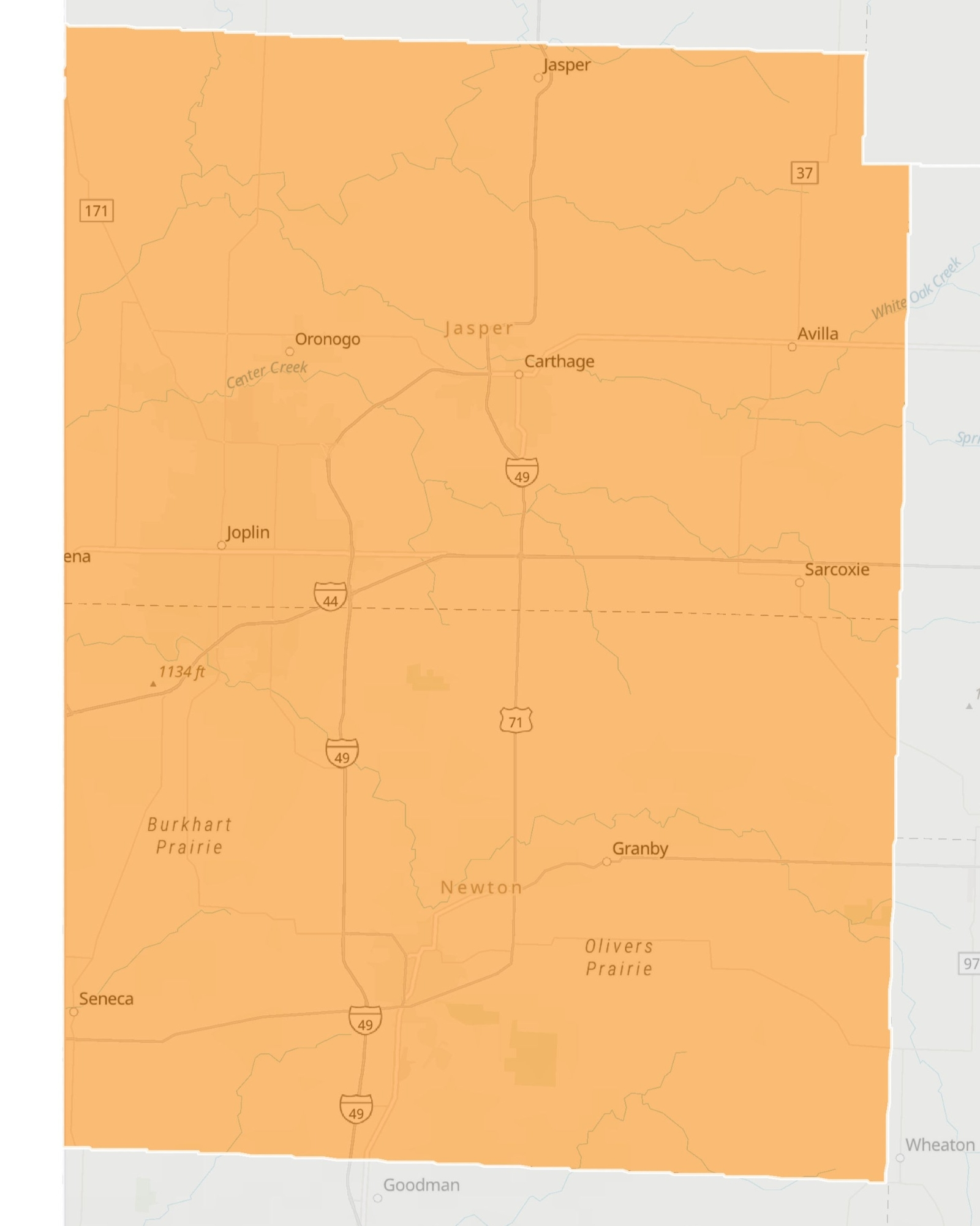
Senator
Jill Carter; R–Granby
- Demographics: 81% White; 1% Black; 9% Hispanic; 1% Asian; 1% Native American; 1% Hawaiian/Pacific Islander; 6% Multiracial
- Population (2023): 183,022

Missouri's 32nd Senatorial District is one of 34 districts in the Missouri Senate. The district has been represented by Republican Jill Carter since 2023.

== Geography ==
The district is based in southwest Missouri, and includes Jasper and Newton counties, the core of the Joplin metropolitan area. Major municipalities in the district include Carthage, Joplin, Neosho, and Webb City. The district is also home to the Battle of Carthage Historic Site and Missouri Southern State University.

== 2026 candidates ==
=== Republican primary ===
- Jill Carter, incumbent senator
- Ellen Nichols, neurosurgeon

== Election results (1998–2022) ==
=== 1998 ===
Missouri's 32nd Senatorial District election (1998)
Party	Candidate	Votes	%
Republican	Marvin Singleton	27,122	69.0
Democratic	Doug Brooks	12,184	31.0
Total votes		39,306	100.0

=== 2002 ===
Missouri's 32nd Senatorial District election (2002)
Party	Candidate	Votes	%
Republican	Gary Nodler	36,993	100.0
Total votes		36,993	100.0
Republican hold			

=== 2006 ===
Missouri's 32nd Senatorial District election (2006)
Party	Candidate	Votes	%
Republican	Gary Nodler (incumbent)	35,240	63.6
Independent	Kim Wright	20,198	36.4
Total votes		55,428	100.0
Republican hold			

=== 2010 ===
Missouri's 32nd Senatorial District election (2010)
Party	Candidate	Votes	%
Republican	Ron Richard	45,190	100.0
Total votes		45,190	100.0
Republican hold			

=== 2014 ===
Missouri's 32nd Senatorial District election (2014)
Party	Candidate	Votes	%
Republican	Ron Richard (incumbent)	32,558	100.0
Total votes		32,558	100.0
Republican hold			

=== 2018 ===
Missouri's 32nd Senatorial District election (2018)
Party	Candidate	Votes	%
Republican	Bill White	48,412	73.7
Democratic	Carolyn McGowan	15,140	23.1
Green	Conon Gillis	2,117	3.2
Total votes		65,669	100.0
Republican hold			

=== 2022 ===
Missouri's 32nd Senatorial District election (2022)
Party	Candidate	Votes	%
Republican	Jill Carter	46,763	100.0
Total votes		46,763	100.0
Republican hold			

== Statewide election results ==
Year	Office	Results
2008	President	McCain 66.7 – 31.4%
2012	President	Romney 72.1 – 27.9%
2016	President	Trump 74.4 – 20.8%
2016	Senate	Blunt 67.6 – 27.3%
2016	Governor	Greitens 70.1 – 26.5%
2018	Senate	Hawley 70.4 – 25.0%
2020	President	Trump 74.1 – 24.0%
2020	Governor	Parson 74.3 – 23.5%
