= 2022 United States House of Representatives elections in Missouri =

- November 8, 2022

All 8 Missouri seats to the United States House of Representatives
	Majority party	Minority party
Party	Republican	Democratic
Last election	6	2
Seats won	6	2
Seat change	Steady	Steady
Popular vote	1,223,617	794,978
Percentage	59.40%	38.59%
Swing	▲1.42%	▼0.83%

Republican
50–60%
60–70%
70–80%
80–90%
Democratic
50–60%
60–70%
70–80%

The 2022 United States House of Representatives elections in Missouri were held on November 8, 2022, to elect the eight U.S. representatives from the state of Missouri, one from each of the state's congressional districts. The elections coincided with other elections to the House of Representatives, elections to the United States Senate, and various state and local elections.

This was the first House of Representatives elections held in Missouri following the 2020 redistricting cycle. The associated primary elections were held on August 2, 2022.

== Redistricting ==
Ahead of the 2022 elections, Missouri redrew its congressional districts as part of the 2020 redistricting cycle. This process was marked by controversy in the Missouri Legislature. On January 19, 2022, the Missouri House of Representatives passed a map with six Republican-leaning and two Democratic-leaning districts. This map was opposed by the Conservative Caucus, a group of hard-line Republicans in the Missouri Senate. The Caucus supported a map with seven Republican-leaning districts. Senate Democrats also opposed the map because they wanted three Democratic-leaning districts. Members of the Conservative Caucus filibustered to block the House map. On March 24, Missouri senators reached a deal and passed a map with six Republican-leaning districts. However, the Senate's version was rejected by the House. The House passed a new map, again with six Republican-leaning districts, which passed the Senate on May 12. Missouri became the last state in the 2020 redistricting cycle to pass a congressional map. Governor Mike Parson approved the map on May 18.

== District 1 ==
2022 Missouri's 1st congressional district election
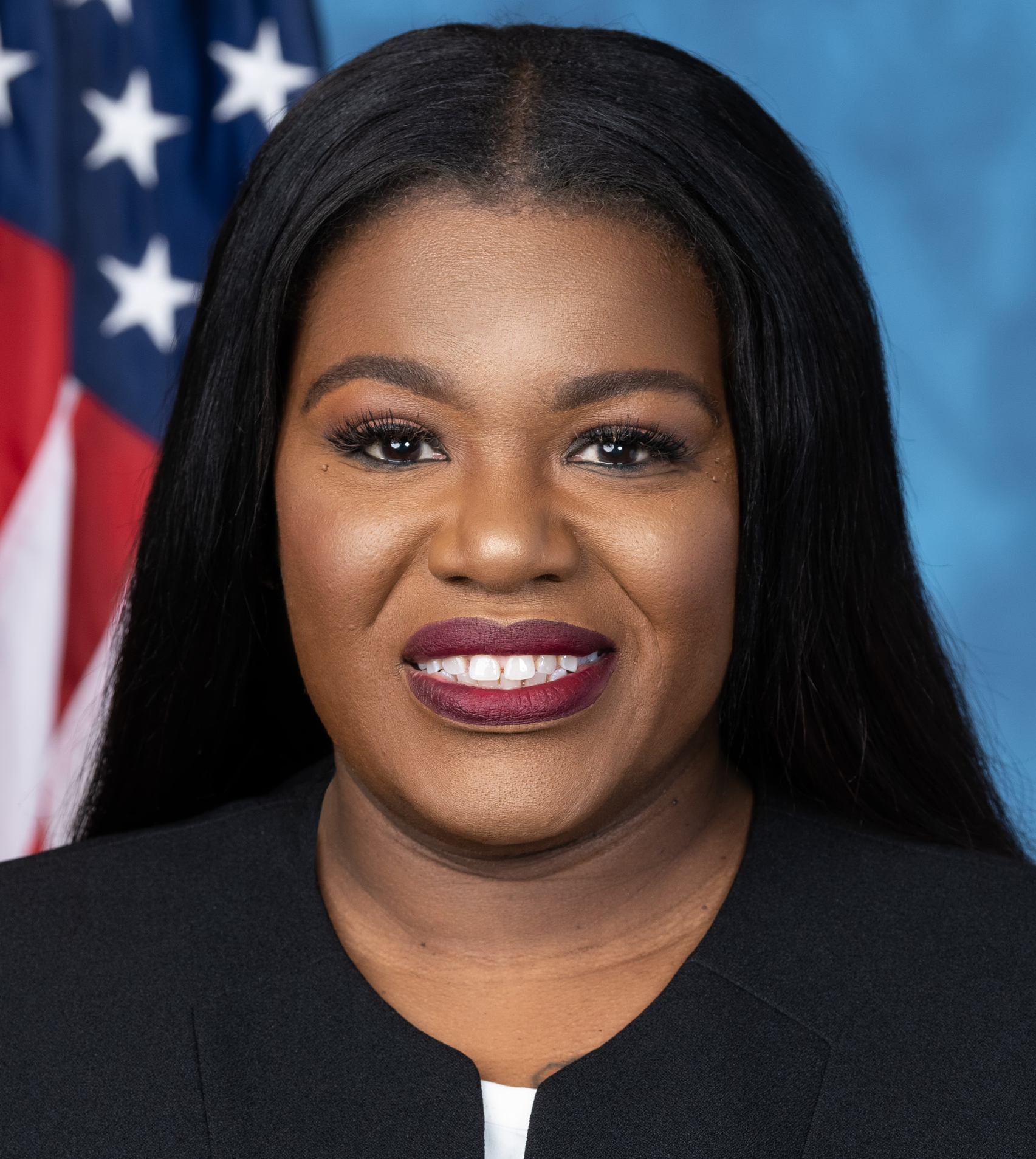

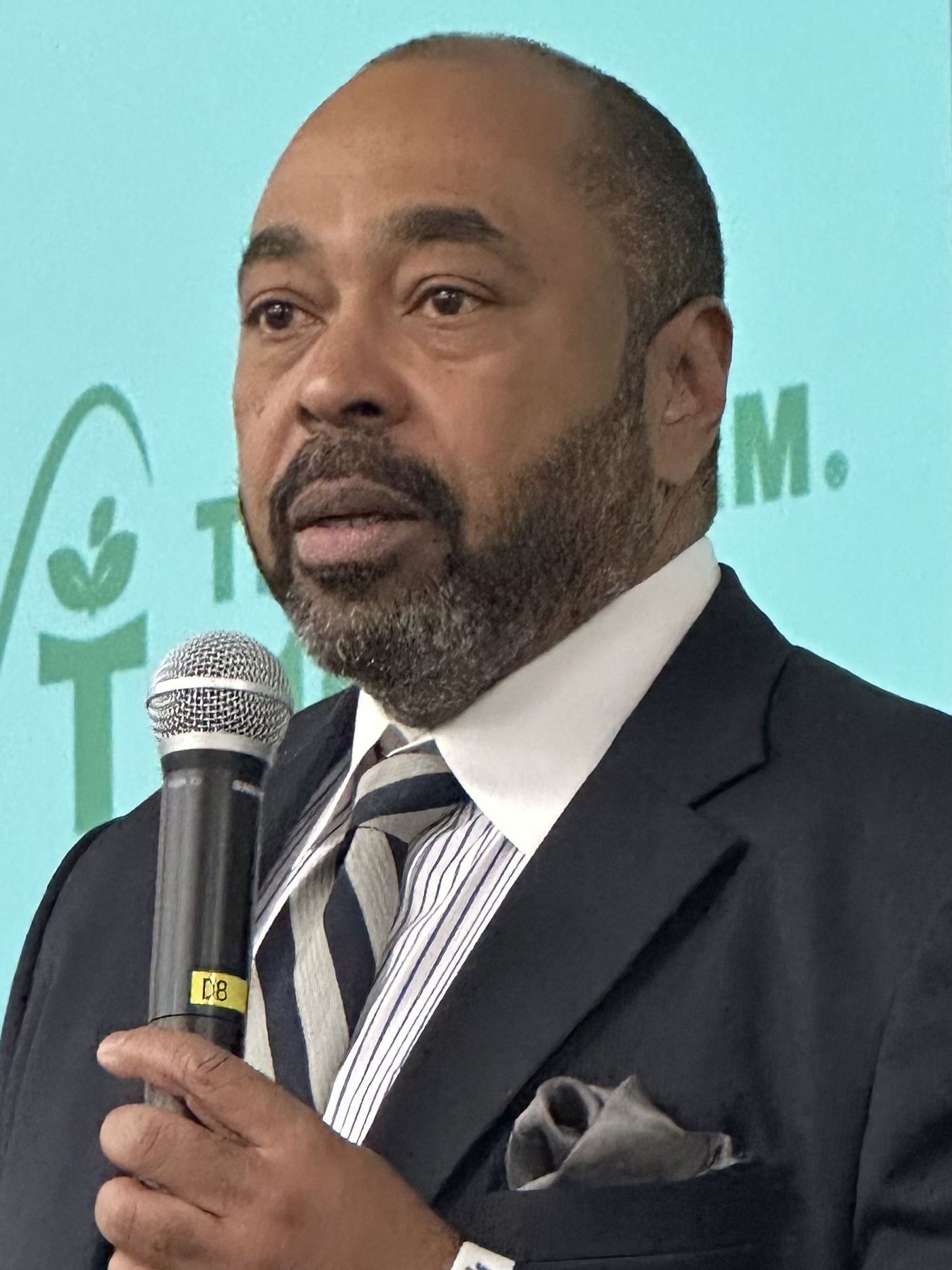
Nominee	Cori Bush	Andrew Jones
Party	Democratic	Republican
Popular vote	160,999	53,767
Percentage	72.9%	24.3%
- County results Bush: 70–80%
U.S. Representative before election
Cori Bush
Democratic
Elected U.S. Representative
Cori Bush
Democratic

The 1st district encompasses the city of St. Louis and much of northern St. Louis County, including Florissant and University City. The incumbent was Democrat Cori Bush, who was elected with 78.8% of the vote in 2020 after defeating the incumbent, Lacy Clay, in the Democratic primary.

=== Democratic primary ===
==== Candidates ====
===== Nominee =====
- Cori Bush, incumbent U.S. representative

===== Eliminated in primary =====
- Earl Childress, pastor
- Michael Daniels, former aide to St. Louis mayor Freeman Bosley Jr.
- Ron Harshaw, assistant high school football coach
- Steve Roberts, state senator for the 5th district

===== Withdrew =====
- David Koehr, Republican candidate for this district in 2014

===== Endorsements =====
Cori Bush

U.S. senators

- Bernie Sanders, U.S. senator from Vermont (2007–present)
- Elizabeth Warren, U.S. senator from Massachusetts (2013–present)

State legislators

- Rasheen Aldridge Jr., state representative for Missouri's 78th district (2019–present)

Organizations

- Brand New Congress
- Congressional Black Caucus PAC
- Democracy for America
- Democratic Socialists of America
- Jewish Voice for Peace Action Fund
- Justice Democrats
- NARAL Pro-Choice America
- National Women's Political Caucus
- Planned Parenthood Action Fund
- Progressive Democrats of America
- Sierra Club
- Sunrise Movement
- Working Families Party
Steve Roberts

U.S. representatives

- Lacy Clay, U.S. representative from Missouri's 1st congressional district (2001–2021)

State legislators

- Marlon Anderson, state representative for Missouri's 76th district (2021–present)

==== Polling ====
Poll source	Date(s) administered	Sample size (Note: Key: A – all adults RV – registered voters LV – likely voters V – unclear)	Margin of error	Cori Bush	Steve Roberts	Other	Undecided
Remington Research (R)/Missouri Scout (Note: Non-partisan poll conducted for the tip sheet Missouri Scout)	July 6–7, 2022	460 (LV)	± 4.6%	40%	20%	9% (Note: Harshaw with 4%; Childress with 3%; Daniels with 2%)	32%
Lincoln Park Strategies (D) (Note: This poll was sponsored by Roberts's campaign.)	May 24–29, 2022	500 (LV)	± 4.4%	36%	18%	–	45%

==== Results ====
Democratic primary results 60–70% Bush 70–80% Bush

Democratic primary results
Party	Candidate	Votes	%
Democratic	Cori Bush (incumbent)	65,326	69.5
Democratic	Steve Roberts	25,015	26.6
Democratic	Michael Daniels	1,683	1.8
Democratic	Ron Harshaw	1,065	1.1
Democratic	Earl Childress	929	1.0
Total votes		94,018	100.0

=== Republican primary ===
==== Candidates ====
===== Nominee =====
- Andrew Jones, utility executive, nominee for mayor of St. Louis in 2017, and candidate in 2021

===== Eliminated in primary =====
- Steven Jordan
- Laura Mitchell-Riley

==== Results ====
Republican primary results
Party	Candidate	Votes	%
Republican	Andrew Jones	6,937	42.4
Republican	Steven Jordan	5,153	31.5
Republican	Laura Mitchell-Riley	4,260	26.1
Total votes		16,350	100.0

=== Libertarian primary ===
==== Candidates ====
===== Nominee =====
- George A. Zsidisin, professor and author

==== Results ====
Libertarian primary results
Party	Candidate	Votes	%
Libertarian	George A. Zsidisin	206	100.0
Total votes		206	100.0

=== General election ===
==== Predictions ====
Source	Ranking	As of
The Cook Political Report	Solid D	May 19, 2022
Inside Elections	Solid D	June 3, 2022
Sabato's Crystal Ball	Safe D	May 25, 2022
Politico	Solid D	May 19, 2022
RCP	Safe D	June 9, 2022
Fox News	Solid D	July 11, 2022
DDHQ	Solid D	July 20, 2022
538	Solid D	June 30, 2022
The Economist	Safe D	September 28, 2022

==== Results ====
2022 Missouri's 1st congressional district election
Party	Candidate	Votes	%
Democratic	Cori Bush (incumbent)	160,999	72.9
Republican	Andrew Jones	53,767	24.3
Libertarian	George A. Zsidisin	6,192	2.8
Total votes		220,958	100.0
Democratic hold			

== District 2 ==
2022 Missouri's 2nd congressional district election
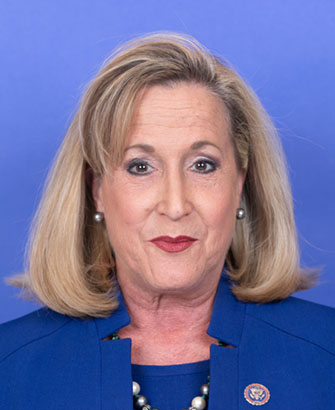

Nominee	Ann Wagner	Trish Gunby
Party	Republican	Democratic
Popular vote	173,277	135,895
Percentage	54.9%	43.1%
- County results Wagner: 50–60% 60–70% 70–80%
U.S. Representative before election
Ann Wagner
Republican
Elected U.S. Representative
Ann Wagner
Republican

The 2nd district is based in eastern Missouri, and includes the southern and western suburbs of St. Louis, including Arnold, Town and Country, Wildwood, Chesterfield, and Oakville. The incumbent was Republican Ann Wagner, who was re-elected with 51.9% of the vote in 2020.

=== Republican primary ===
==== Candidates ====
===== Nominee =====
- Ann Wagner, incumbent U.S. representative

===== Eliminated in primary =====
- Paul Berry III, 2018 and 2020 Republican nominee for St. Louis County executive
- Tony Salvatore
- Wesley Smith, U.S. Army veteran

==== Endorsements ====
Ann Wagner

Organizations

- Maggie's List
- Pro-Israel America

==== Results ====
Republican primary results
Party	Candidate	Votes	%
Republican	Ann Wagner (incumbent)	54,440	67.1
Republican	Tony Salvatore	12,516	15.4
Republican	Wesley Smith	7,317	9.0
Republican	Paul Berry III	6,888	8.5
Total votes		81,161	100.0

=== Democratic primary ===
==== Candidates ====
===== Nominee =====
- Trish Gunby, state representative

===== Eliminated in primary =====
- Ray Reed, political organizer

===== Withdrew =====
- Ben Samuels, former director of special projects for Governor Charlie Baker

===== Endorsements =====
Trish Gunby

Organizations

- National Women's Political Caucus
- Sierra Club

==== Results ====
Democratic primary results
Party	Candidate	Votes	%
Democratic	Trish Gunby	50,457	85.2
Democratic	Ray Reed	8,741	14.8
Total votes		59,198	100.0

=== Libertarian primary ===
==== Candidates ====
===== Nominee =====
- Bill Slantz, consulting firm executive

==== Results ====
Libertarian primary results
Party	Candidate	Votes	%
Libertarian	Bill Slantz	384	100.0
Total votes		384	100.0

=== General election ===
==== Predictions ====
Source	Ranking	As of
The Cook Political Report	Solid R	May 19, 2022
Inside Elections	Solid R	June 3, 2022
Sabato's Crystal Ball	Safe R	May 25, 2022
Politico	Likely R	May 19, 2022
RCP	Likely R	June 9, 2022
Fox News	Solid R	July 11, 2022
DDHQ	Solid R	July 20, 2022
538	Solid R	June 30, 2022
The Economist	Safe R	September 28, 2022

==== Results ====
2022 Missouri's 2nd congressional district election
Party	Candidate	Votes	%
Republican	Ann Wagner (incumbent)	173,277	54.9
Democratic	Trish Gunby	135,895	43.1
Libertarian	Bill Slantz	6,494	2.1
Total votes		315,666	100.0
Republican hold			

== District 3 ==
2022 Missouri's 3rd congressional district election
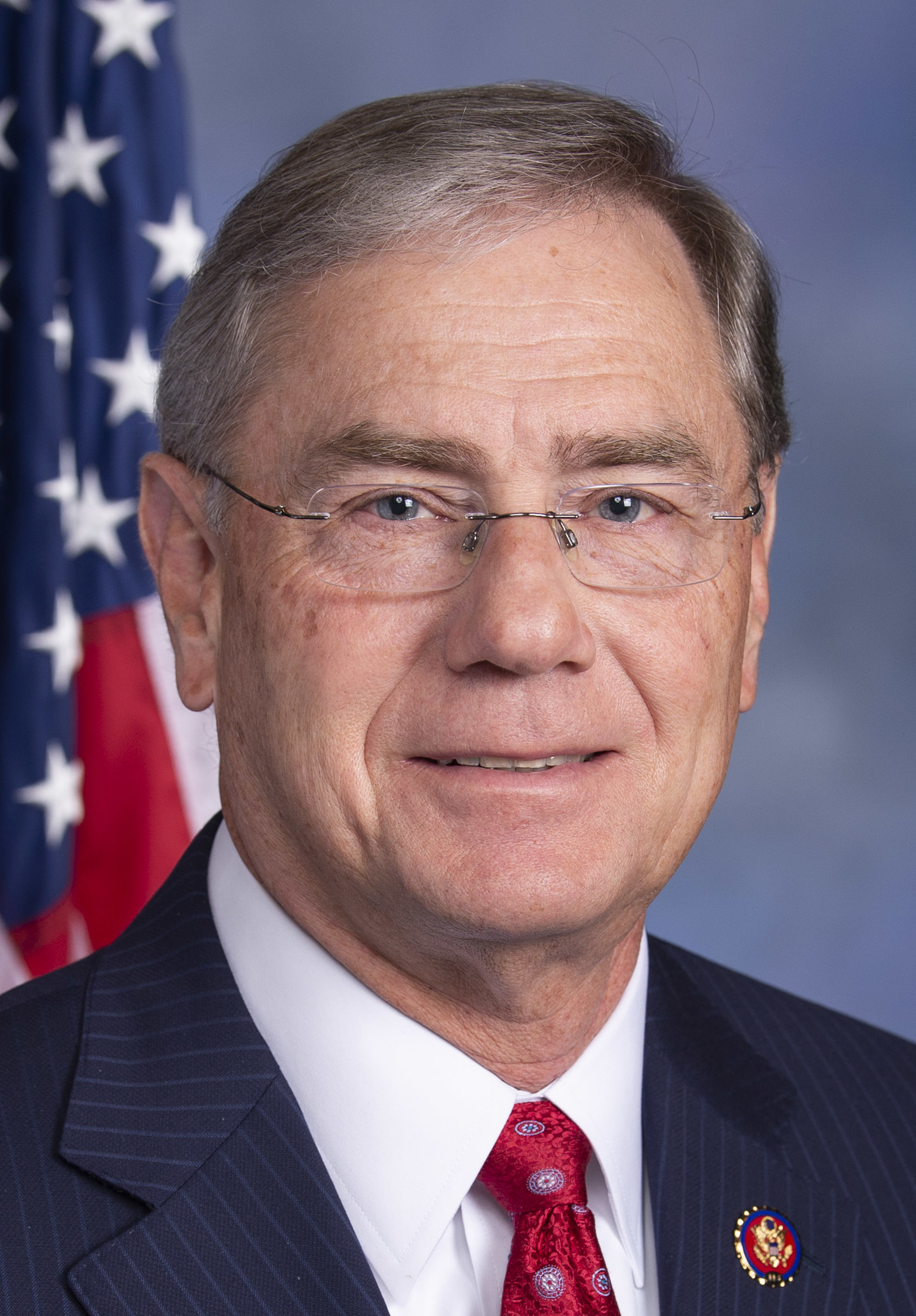

Nominee	Blaine Luetkemeyer	Bethany Mann
Party	Republican	Democratic
Popular vote	180,746	96,851
Percentage	65.1%	34.9%
- County results Luetkemeyer: 50–60% 60–70% 70–80% 80–90% Mann: 50–60%
U.S. Representative before election
Blaine Luetkemeyer
Republican
Elected U.S. Representative
Blaine Luetkemeyer
Republican

The third district encompasses east-central Missouri, taking in Jefferson City, Troy, O'Fallon, and Washington. The incumbent was Republican Blaine Luetkemeyer, who was re-elected with 69.4% of the vote in 2020.

=== Republican primary ===
==== Candidates ====
===== Nominee =====
- Blaine Luetkemeyer, incumbent U.S. representative

===== Eliminated in primary =====
- Dustin Hill
- Richard Skwira Jr.
- Brandon Wilkinson, truck driver and candidate for this seat in 2020

===== Withdrew =====
- Josh Ciskowski

==== Endorsements ====
Blaine Luetkemeyer

Executive branch officials

- Donald Trump, former president of the United States

==== Results ====
Republican primary results
Party	Candidate	Votes	%
Republican	Blaine Luetkemeyer (incumbent)	66,430	69.6
Republican	Brandon Wilkinson	15,796	16.5
Republican	Dustin Hill	11,610	12.2
Republican	Richard Skwira Jr.	1,616	1.7
Total votes		95,452	100.0

=== Democratic primary ===
==== Candidates ====
===== Nominee =====
- Bethany Mann, technology specialist

===== Eliminated in primary =====
- Andrew Daly, director of the Missouri School for the Deaf Activities
- Dylan Durrwachter
- Jon Karlen

===== Withdrawn =====
- Josh Nicoloff, audit manager

==== Results ====
Democratic primary results
Party	Candidate	Votes	%
Democratic	Bethany Mann	22,638	62.2
Democratic	Jon Karlen	7,349	20.2
Democratic	Andrew Daly	5,184	14.3
Democratic	Dylan Durrwachter	1,197	3.3
Total votes		36,368	100.0

=== General election ===
==== Predictions ====
Source	Ranking	As of
The Cook Political Report	Solid R	May 19, 2022
Inside Elections	Solid R	June 3, 2022
Sabato's Crystal Ball	Safe R	May 25, 2022
Politico	Solid R	May 19, 2022
RCP	Safe R	June 9, 2022
Fox News	Solid R	July 11, 2022
DDHQ	Solid R	July 20, 2022
538	Solid R	June 30, 2022
The Economist	Safe R	September 28, 2022

==== Results ====
2022 Missouri's 3rd congressional district election
Party	Candidate	Votes	%
Republican	Blaine Luetkemeyer (incumbent)	180,746	65.1
Democratic	Bethany Mann	96,851	34.9
Total votes		277,597	100.0
Republican hold			

== District 4 ==
2022 Missouri's 4th congressional district election
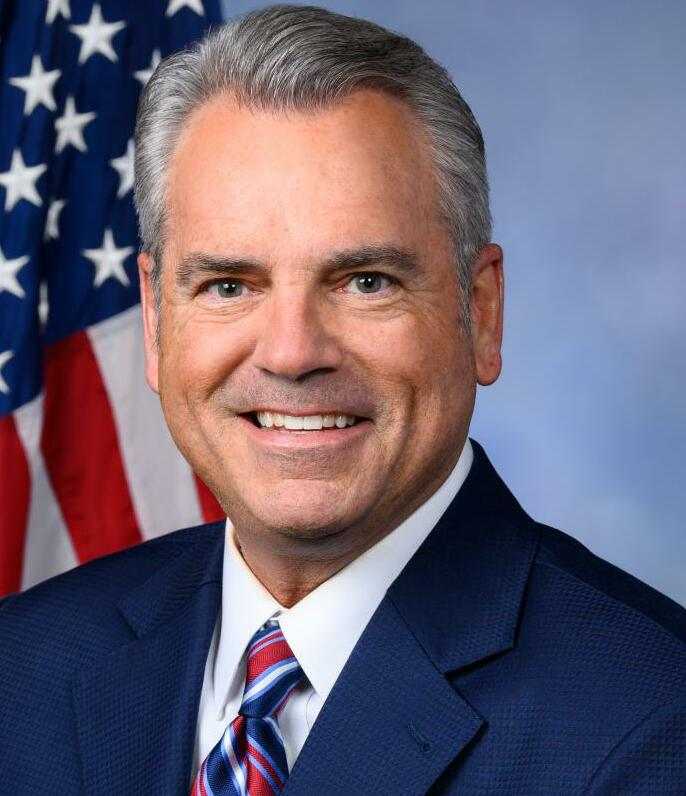

Nominee	Mark Alford	Jack Truman
Party	Republican	Democratic
Popular vote	181,890	67,069
Percentage	71.3%	26.3%
- County results Alford: 60–70% 70–80% 80–90% Truman: 50–60%
U.S. Representative before election
Vicky Hartzler
Republican
Elected U.S. Representative
Mark Alford
Republican

The 4th district is based in predominantly rural west-central Missouri, taking in Columbia, Sedalia, Warrensburg, and Lebanon. The incumbent was Republican Vicky Hartzler, who was re-elected with 67.6% of the vote in 2020. Hartzler chose not to run for re-election and instead ran for U.S. Senate.

=== Republican primary ===
==== Candidates ====
===== Nominee =====
- Mark Alford, former news anchor at WDAF-TV

===== Eliminated in primary =====
- Rick Brattin, state senator
- Kalena Bruce, cattle farmer
- Taylor Burks, former Boone County clerk
- Jim Campbell, former professional ice hockey player
- Bill Irwin, retired Navy Seal captain and former Lee's Summit police officer
- Kyle LaBrue, land developer

===== Deceased =====
- Ed Emery, former state senator (died August 6, 2021)

===== Withdrew =====
- Ryan Johnson, Cass County commissioner
- Sara Walsh, state representative

===== Declined =====
- Sandy Crawford, state senator (running for re-election)
- Vicky Hartzler, incumbent U.S. representative (running for U.S. senate)
- Caleb Rowden, majority leader of the Missouri Senate

==== Endorsements ====
Mark Alford

Local officials

- Carl Bettels, Bates County recorder of deeds
- Ken Mooney, Bates County commissioner
- Trent Nelson, Bates County commissioner
- Jim Wheatly, Bates County commissioner
Rick Brattin

Organizations

- American Conservative Union
- FreedomWorks
Kalena Bruce

Statewide officials

- Mike Parson, governor of Missouri (2018–present), lieutenant governor of Missouri (2017–2018), state senator for the 28th district (2011–2017), state representative for the 133rd district (2005–2011), and sheriff of Polk County (1993–2004)
Taylor Burks

U.S. senators

- Tom Cotton, U.S. senator from Arkansas (2015–present)

Organizations

- International Association of Firefighters
- With Honor Action

==== Polling ====
Poll source	Date(s) administered	Sample size	Margin of error	Mark Alford	Rick Brattin	Kalena Bruce	Taylor Burks	Bill Irwin	Sara Walsh	Undecided
Remington Research (R)/Missouri Scout	January 19–20, 2022	617 (LV)	± 3.8%	21%	9%	6%	4%	4%	14%	42%

==== Results ====
Primary results by county: Alford: 20–30%; 40–50%; 50–60%; 70–80%; Brattin: 20–30%; 30–40%; 50–60%; Bruce: 20–30%; 30–40%; 40–50%; 50–60%; Burks: 20–30%; 30–40%

Republican primary results
Party	Candidate	Votes	%
Republican	Mark Alford	36,981	35.2
Republican	Rick Brattin	22,509	21.4
Republican	Kalena Bruce	16,677	15.9
Republican	Taylor Burks	10,624	10.1
Republican	Bill Irwin	9,648	9.2
Republican	Jim Campbell	4,642	4.4
Republican	Kyle LaBrue	4,026	3.8
Total votes		105,107	100.0

=== Democratic primary ===
==== Candidates ====
===== Nominee =====
- Jack Truman, candidate for this district in 2016

==== Results ====
Democratic primary results
Party	Candidate	Votes	%
Democratic	Jack Truman	25,641	100.0
Total votes		25,641	100.0

=== Libertarian primary ===
==== Candidates ====
===== Nominee =====
- Randy Langkraehr

==== Results ====
Libertarian primary results
Party	Candidate	Votes	%
Libertarian	Randy Langkraehr	426	100.0
Total votes		426	100.0

=== General election ===
==== Predictions ====
Source	Ranking	As of
The Cook Political Report	Solid R	May 19, 2022
Inside Elections	Solid R	June 3, 2022
Sabato's Crystal Ball	Safe R	May 25, 2022
Politico	Solid R	May 19, 2022
RCP	Safe R	June 9, 2022
Fox News	Solid R	July 11, 2022
DDHQ	Solid R	July 20, 2022
538	Solid R	June 30, 2022
The Economist	Safe R	September 28, 2022

==== Post-primary endorsements ====
Mark Alford

Federal officials

- Donald Trump, former president of the United States (2017–2021)

==== Results ====
2022 Missouri's 4th congressional district election
Party	Candidate	Votes	%
Republican	Mark Alford	181,890	71.3
Democratic	Jack Truman	67,069	26.3
Libertarian	Randy Langkraehr	6,117	2.4
Write-in		3	0.0
Total votes		255,079	100.0
Republican hold			

== District 5 ==
2022 Missouri's 5th congressional district election
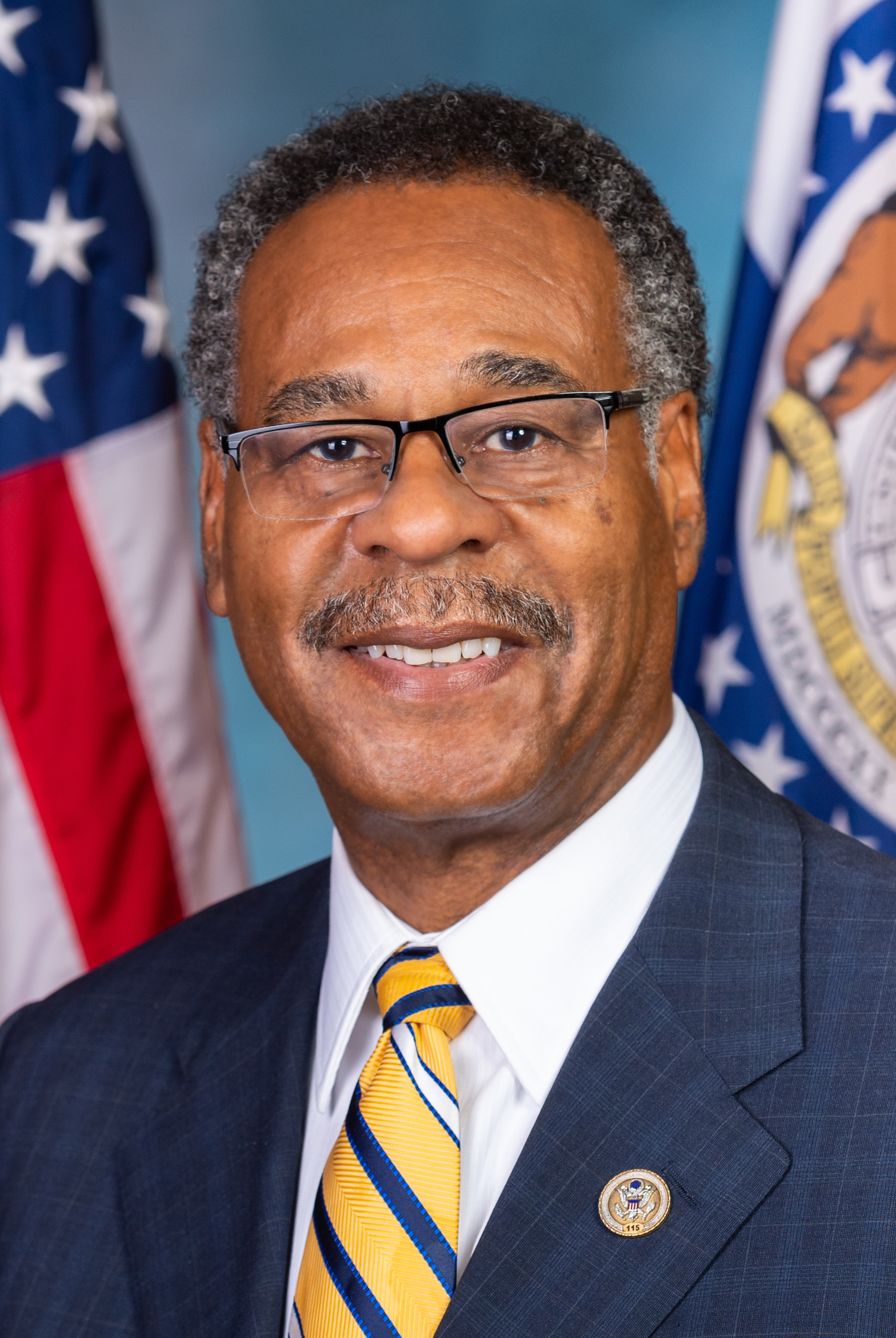

Nominee	Emanuel Cleaver	Jacob Turk
Party	Democratic	Republican
Popular vote	140,688	84,008
Percentage	61.0%	36.4%
- County results Cleaver: 50–60% 60–70%
U.S. Representative before election
Emanuel Cleaver
Democratic
Elected U.S. Representative
Emanuel Cleaver
Democratic

The 5th district primarily consists of the inner ring of the Kansas City metropolitan area, including nearly all of Kansas City south of the Missouri River. The incumbent was Democrat Emanuel Cleaver, who was re-elected with 58.8% of the vote in 2020.

=== Democratic primary ===
==== Candidates ====
===== Nominee =====
- Emanuel Cleaver, incumbent U.S. representative

===== Eliminated in primary =====
- Maite Salazar, progressive activist and candidate for this district in 2020

==== Endorsements ====
Emanuel Cleaver

Organizations

- Planned Parenthood Action Fund
- Sierra Club

==== Results ====
Democratic primary results
Party	Candidate	Votes	%
Democratic	Emanuel Cleaver (incumbent)	60,399	85.6
Democratic	Maite Salazar	10,147	14.4
Total votes		70,546	100.0

=== Republican primary ===
==== Nominee ====
- Jacob Turk, perennial candidate for this seat in 2006, 2008, 2010, 2012, 2014, 2016, and 2018

==== Eliminated in primary ====
- Jerry Barham, candidate for this district in 2020
- Herschel L. Young, former Cass County commissioner and perennial candidate

==== Results ====
Republican primary results
Party	Candidate	Votes	%
Republican	Jacob Turk	20,475	51.8
Republican	Jerry Barham	13,246	33.5
Republican	Herschel L. Young	5,833	14.7
Total votes		39,554	100.0

=== Libertarian primary ===
==== Candidates ====
===== Nominee =====
- Robin Dominick, truck driver and nominee for this district in 2020

==== Results ====
Libertarian primary results
Party	Candidate	Votes	%
Libertarian	Robin Dominick	589	100.0
Total votes		589	100.0

=== General election ===
==== Predictions ====
Source	Ranking	As of
The Cook Political Report	Solid D	May 19, 2022
Inside Elections	Solid D	June 3, 2022
Sabato's Crystal Ball	Safe D	May 25, 2022
Politico	Solid D	May 19, 2022
RCP	Safe D	June 9, 2022
Fox News	Solid D	July 11, 2022
DDHQ	Solid D	July 20, 2022
538	Solid D	June 30, 2022
The Economist	Safe D	September 28, 2022

==== Results ====
2022 Missouri's 5th congressional district election
Party	Candidate	Votes	%
Democratic	Emanuel Cleaver (incumbent)	140,688	61.0
Republican	Jacob Turk	84,008	36.4
Libertarian	Robin Dominick	5,859	2.5
Total votes		230,555	100.0
Democratic hold			

== District 6 ==
2022 Missouri's 6th congressional district election
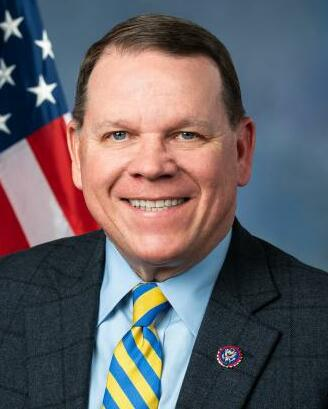

Nominee	Sam Graves	Henry Martin
Party	Republican	Democratic
Popular vote	184,865	72,253
Percentage	70.3%	27.5%
- County results Graves: 50–60% 60–70% 70–80% 80–90%
U.S. Representative before election
Sam Graves
Republican
Elected U.S. Representative
Sam Graves
Republican

The 6th district encompasses rural northern Missouri, St. Joseph and much of Kansas City north of the Missouri River. The incumbent was Republican Sam Graves, who was re-elected with 67.1% of the vote in 2020.

=== Republican primary ===
==== Candidates ====
===== Nominee =====
- Sam Graves, incumbent U.S. representative

===== Eliminated in primary =====
- John Dady
- Brandon Kleinmeyer, tax preparer
- Christopher Ryan, perennial candidate
- Dakota Shultz, software developer

==== Results ====
Republican primary results
Party	Candidate	Votes	%
Republican	Sam Graves (incumbent)	72,996	75.7
Republican	Christopher Ryan	7,848	8.1
Republican	Brandon Kleinmeyer	7,414	7.7
Republican	Dakota Shultz	5,902	6.1
Republican	John Dady	2,309	2.4
Total votes		96,469	100.0

=== Democratic primary ===
==== Candidates ====
===== Nominee =====
- Henry Martin, U.S. Army veteran and candidate for this district in 2020

===== Eliminated in primary =====
- Michael Howard
- Charles West, Clark County school board member and candidate for this district in 2020

==== Results ====
Democratic primary results
Party	Candidate	Votes	%
Democratic	Henry Martin	13,488	46.2
Democratic	Charles West	9,761	33.4
Democratic	Michael Howard	5,959	20.4
Total votes		29,208	100.0

=== Libertarian primary ===
==== Candidates ====
===== Nominee =====
- Edward A (Andy) Maidment U.S. Army veteran and computer security professional

==== Results ====
Libertarian primary results
Party	Candidate	Votes	%
Libertarian	Edward A (Andy) Maidment	350	100.0
Total votes		350	100.0

=== General election ===
==== Predictions ====
Source	Ranking	As of
The Cook Political Report	Solid R	May 19, 2022
Inside Elections	Solid R	June 3, 2022
Sabato's Crystal Ball	Safe R	May 25, 2022
Politico	Solid R	May 19, 2022
RCP	Safe R	June 9, 2022
Fox News	Solid R	July 11, 2022
DDHQ	Solid R	July 20, 2022
538	Solid R	June 30, 2022
The Economist	Safe R	September 28, 2022

==== Results ====
2022 Missouri's 6th congressional district election
Party	Candidate	Votes	%
Republican	Sam Graves (incumbent)	184,865	70.3
Democratic	Henry Martin	72,253	27.5
Libertarian	Edward A (Andy) Maidment	5,774	2.2
Total votes		262,892	100.0
Republican hold			

== District 7 ==
2022 Missouri's 7th congressional district election
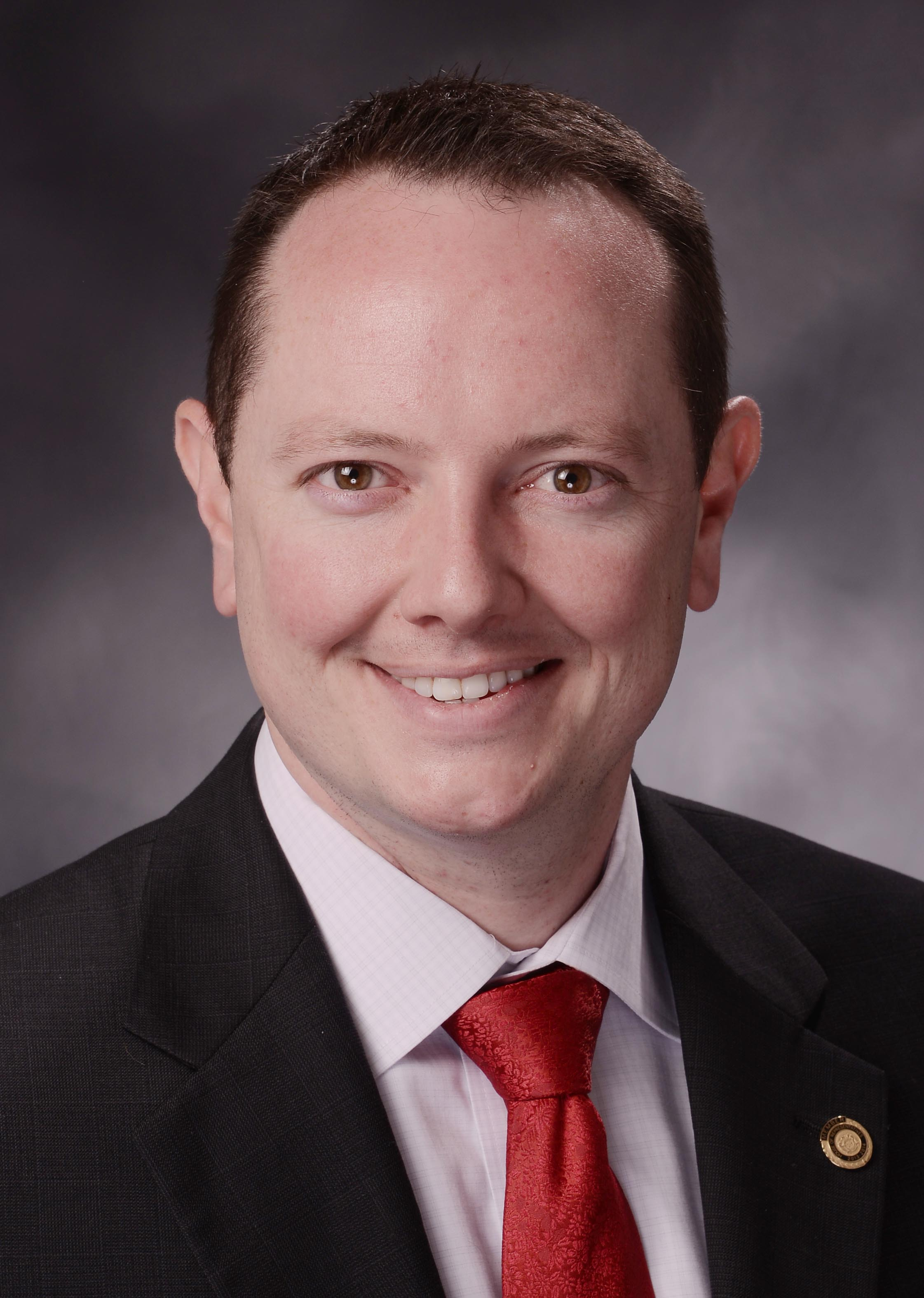

Nominee	Eric Burlison	Kristen Radaker-Sheafer
Party	Republican	Democratic
Popular vote	178,592	67,485
Percentage	70.9%	26.9%
- County results Burlison: 50–60% 70–80% 80–90%
U.S. Representative before election
Billy Long
Republican
Elected U.S. Representative
Eric Burlison
Republican

The 7th district is located in southwestern Missouri, taking in Springfield, Joplin, Branson, and Nixa. The incumbent was Republican Billy Long, who had been re-elected with 68.9% of the vote in 2020. Long chose not to run for re-election and instead ran for U.S. senate.

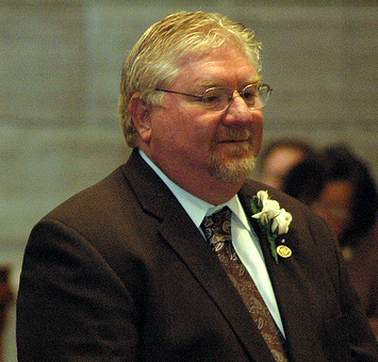
Former state senator Jay Wasson from Nixa

=== Republican primary ===
==== Candidates ====
===== Nominee =====
- Eric Burlison, state senator

===== Eliminated in primary =====
- Sam Alexander, physician
- Alex Bryant, minister
- Camille Lombardi-Olive, candidate for this district in 2020 and Missouri's 1st congressional district in 2018
- Mike Moon, state senator
- Audrey Richards, nonprofit consultant and independent write-in candidate for this district in 2020
- Paul Walker
- Jay Wasson, former mayor of Nixa and former state senator

===== Declined =====
- Bob Dixon, Greene County presiding commissioner and former state senator
- Tim Garrison, former United States attorney for the Western District of Missouri
- Elijah Haahr, former speaker of the Missouri House of Representatives
- Lincoln Hough, state senator (running for re-election)
- Billy Long, incumbent U.S. representative (running for U.S. senate)
- Gary Nodler, former state senator
- Ron Richard, former state senator and former speaker of the Missouri House of Representatives
- Cody Smith, state representative
- Bill White, state senator

==== Endorsements ====
Eric Burlison

U.S. senators

- Ted Cruz, U.S. senator from Texas (2013–present)

Organizations

- American Conservative Union
- Club for Growth
- FreedomWorks
- House Freedom Fund

==== Polling ====
Poll source	Date(s) administered	Sample size	Margin of error	Sam Alexander	Eric Burlison	Mike Moon	Audrey Richards	Jay Wasson	Other	Undecided
WPA Intelligence (R) (Note: This poll was sponsored by Burlison's campaign.)	May 20–22, 2022	404 (LV)	± 4.4%	–	24%	16%	–	14%	6%	40%
American Viewpoint (R) (Note: This poll was sponsored by Wasson's campaign.)	May 10–12, 2022	400 (LV)	± 4.9%	–	15%	17%	–	21%	16%	31%
Remington Research (R)/Missouri Scout	January 6–7, 2022	797 (LV)	± 3.4%	6%	21%	12%	3%	9%	–	49%

==== Results ====
Republican primary results
Party	Candidate	Votes	%
Republican	Eric Burlison	39,443	38.2
Republican	Jay Wasson	23,253	22.5
Republican	Alex Bryant	18,522	17.9
Republican	Mike Moon	8,957	8.7
Republican	Sam Alexander	5,665	5.5
Republican	Audrey Richards	3,095	3.0
Republican	Paul Walker	3,028	2.9
Republican	Camille Lombardi-Olive	1,363	1.3
Total votes		103,326	100.0

=== Democratic primary ===
==== Candidates ====
===== Nominee =====
- Kristen Radaker-Sheafer, business owner

===== Eliminated in primary =====
- Bryce F. Lockwood
- John M. Woodman, business owner

==== Results ====
Democratic primary results
Party	Candidate	Votes	%
Democratic	Kristen Radaker-Sheafer	13,680	63.3
Democratic	John M. Woodman	5,493	25.4
Democratic	Bryce F. Lockwood	2,430	11.2
Total votes		21,603	100.0

=== Libertarian primary ===
==== Candidates ====
===== Nominee =====
- Kevin Craig, founder of a Christian anarchist group and perennial candidate

==== Results ====
Libertarian primary results
Party	Candidate	Votes	%
Libertarian	Kevin Craig	416	100.0
Total votes		416	100.0

=== General election ===
==== Predictions ====
Source	Ranking	As of
The Cook Political Report	Solid R	May 19, 2022
Inside Elections	Solid R	June 3, 2022
Sabato's Crystal Ball	Safe R	May 25, 2022
Politico	Solid R	May 19, 2022
RCP	Safe R	June 9, 2022
Fox News	Solid R	July 11, 2022
DDHQ	Solid R	July 20, 2022
538	Solid R	June 30, 2022
The Economist	Safe R	September 28, 2022

==== Post-primary endorsements ====
Eric Burlison

Federal officials

- Donald Trump, former president of the United States (2017–2021)

==== Results ====
2022 Missouri's 7th congressional district election
Party	Candidate	Votes	%
Republican	Eric Burlison	178,592	70.9
Democratic	Kristen Radaker-Sheafer	67,485	26.8
Libertarian	Kevin Craig	5,869	2.3
Write-in		1	0.0
Total votes		251,947	100.0
Republican hold			

== District 8 ==
2022 Missouri's 8th congressional district election
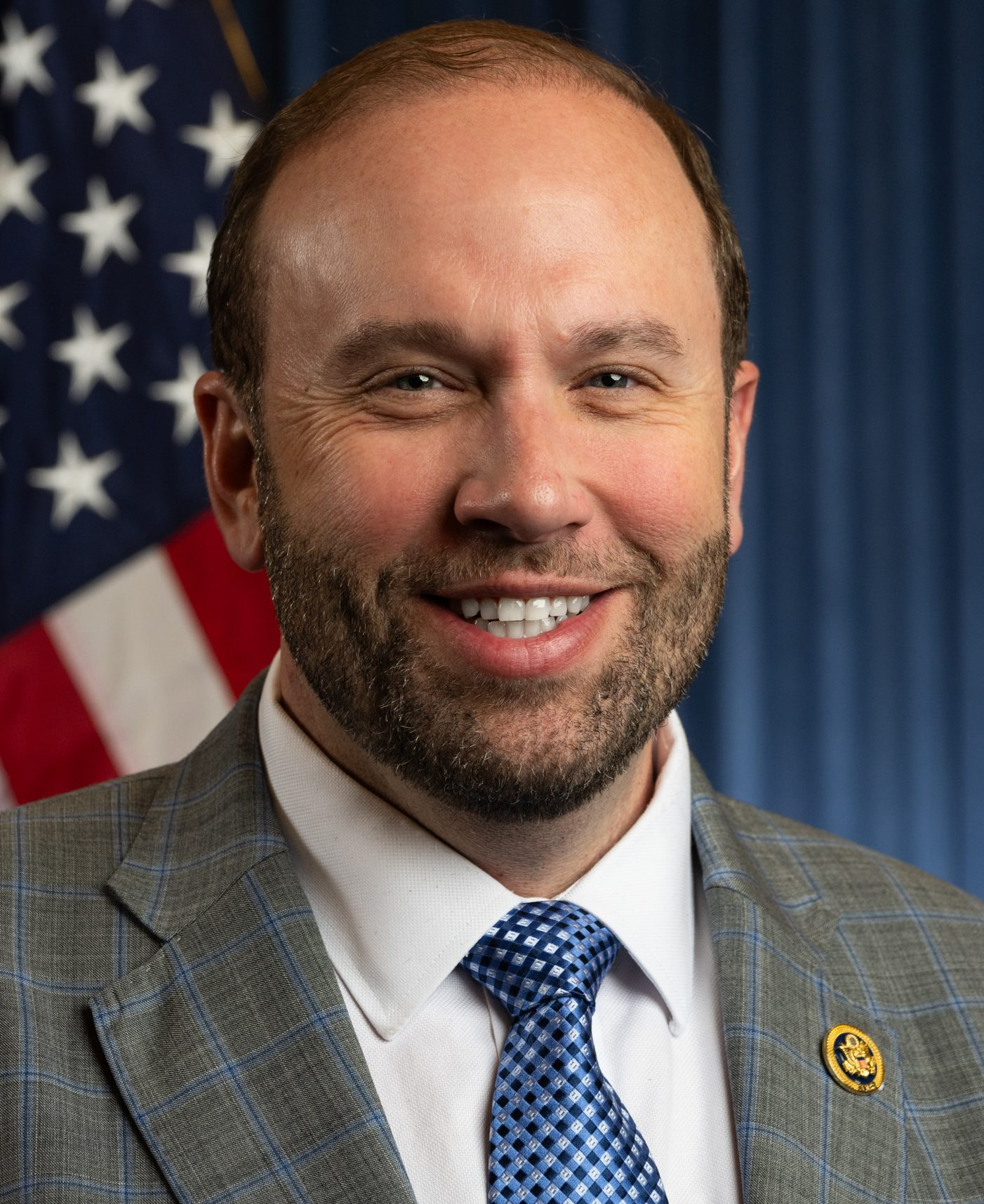

Nominee	Jason Smith	Randi McCallian
Party	Republican	Democratic
Popular vote	186,472	53,738
Percentage	76.0%	21.9%
- County results Smith: 60–70% 70–80% 80–90%
U.S. Representative before election
Jason Smith
Republican
Elected U.S. Representative
Jason Smith
Republican

The 8th district is the most rural district of Missouri, taking in rural southeastern Missouri, including the Missouri Bootheel, as well as the cities of Cape Girardeau and Poplar Bluff. The incumbent was Republican Jason Smith, who was re-elected with 76.9% of the vote in 2020.

=== Republican primary ===
==== Candidates ====
===== Nominee =====
- Jason Smith, incumbent U.S. representative

===== Eliminated in primary =====
- Jacob Turner

==== Endorsements ====
Jason Smith

Executive branch officials

- Donald Trump, former president of the United States

==== Results ====
Republican primary results
Party	Candidate	Votes	%
Republican	Jason Smith (incumbent)	78,342	82.0
Republican	Jacob Turner	17,242	18.0
Total votes		95,584	100.0

=== Democratic primary ===
==== Candidates ====
===== Nominee =====
- Randi McCallian

==== Results ====
Democratic primary results
Party	Candidate	Votes	%
Democratic	Randi McCallian	16,691	100.0
Total votes		16,691	100.0

=== Libertarian primary ===
==== Candidates ====
===== Nominee =====
- Jim Higgins, perennial candidate

==== Results ====
Libertarian primary results
Party	Candidate	Votes	%
Libertarian	Jim Higgins	232	100.0
Total votes		232	100.0

=== General election ===
==== Predictions ====
Source	Ranking	As of
The Cook Political Report	Solid R	May 19, 2022
Inside Elections	Solid R	June 3, 2022
Sabato's Crystal Ball	Safe R	May 25, 2022
Politico	Solid R	May 19, 2022
RCP	Safe R	June 9, 2022
Fox News	Solid R	July 11, 2022
DDHQ	Solid R	July 20, 2022
538	Solid R	June 30, 2022
The Economist	Safe R	September 28, 2022

==== Results ====
2022 Missouri's 8th congressional district election
Party	Candidate	Votes	%
Republican	Jason Smith (incumbent)	186,472	76.0
Democratic	Randi McCallian	53,738	21.9
Libertarian	Jim Higgins	5,185	2.1
Total votes		245,395	100.0
Republican hold			

== See also ==
- 2022 Missouri elections

== Notes ==
Partisan clients
