= Senator Singleton =

Senator Singleton may refer to:

- Bobby Singleton (politician) (born 1962), Alabama State Senate
- Marvin Singleton (born 1939), Missouri State Senate
- Otho R. Singleton (1814–1889), Mississippi State Senate
- Troy Singleton (born 1973), New Jersey Senate
