= James Duard Marshall =

American artist

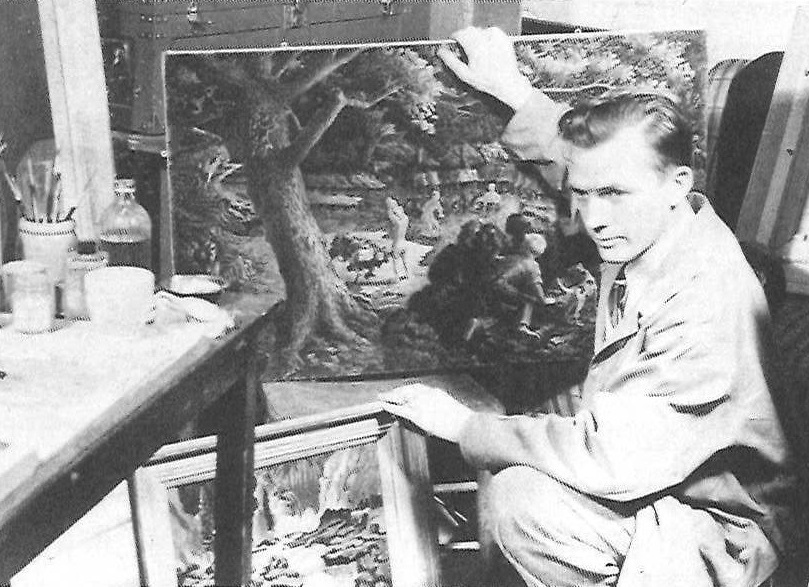
- Born: September 29, 1914; Springfield, Missouri, US
- Died: January 26, 2010 (aged 95); Lumberton, New Jersey, US
- Other name: Duard Marshall
- Education: University of Arkansas; Kansas City Art Institute; Colorado Springs Fine Arts Center; University of Denver
- Occupation: Artist
- Known for: Lithography, egg tempera, woodcut

James Duard Marshall (September 29, 1914 – January 26, 2010) was a painter, lithographer, museum director, and art conservator who lived most of his life in Kansas City. Duard [pronounced "doo-erd"] was a student of Thomas Hart Benton and is best known for his 30-foot mural created for the centennial of Neosho, Missouri in 1939. The civic leaders of Neosho had approached Benton to produce the mural, as Benton had been born in Neosho, but he suggested that his student Marshall do the job. That mural hangs in the Neosho Newton County Library.

== Family and academic life ==
Marshall was born to James Claude Marshall and Bertha Dee Shipley in Springfield, Missouri. Marshall's father died in 1918 when Marshall was just four years old. After the death of his father, Marshall and his family moved to Fayetteville, Arkansas, his mother's hometown. His mother died in 1933 when Duard was 19. Marshall graduated from high school in Fayetteville, Arkansas, in 1933. In 1934 and 1935, he worked for the Federal Emergency Relief Administration teaching art classes in Fayetteville. In 1935, Marshall began to study art at the University of Arkansas with Elizabeth Galbraith, but in September 1935, he entered the Kansas City Art Institute to study with Thomas Hart Benton. In 1937, Marshall married fellow KCAI student, Helen Mitchell of Neosho, Missouri. He remained at KCAI for five years, graduating with a four-year certificate in May 1940. In the summer of 1940, Marshall studied with Boardman Robinson at the Colorado Springs Fine Arts Center, later part of Colorado College. Marshall returned to Colorado College, after a few years in government service during World War II, and finished his bachelor's degree at Colorado College in 1945. Marshall's only child was born in Neosho, Missouri in 1945. In 1951, Marshall and his wife Helen divorced and he was remarried to Bonnie L. Davis. Marshall and Davis remained married until her death in 2006. After completing his undergraduate work at Colorado College, Marshall enrolled at the University of Denver and completed his master's degree in 1951, with a thesis titled "Several Methods for Facilitating Drawing, Painting and Sculptural Art Expression."

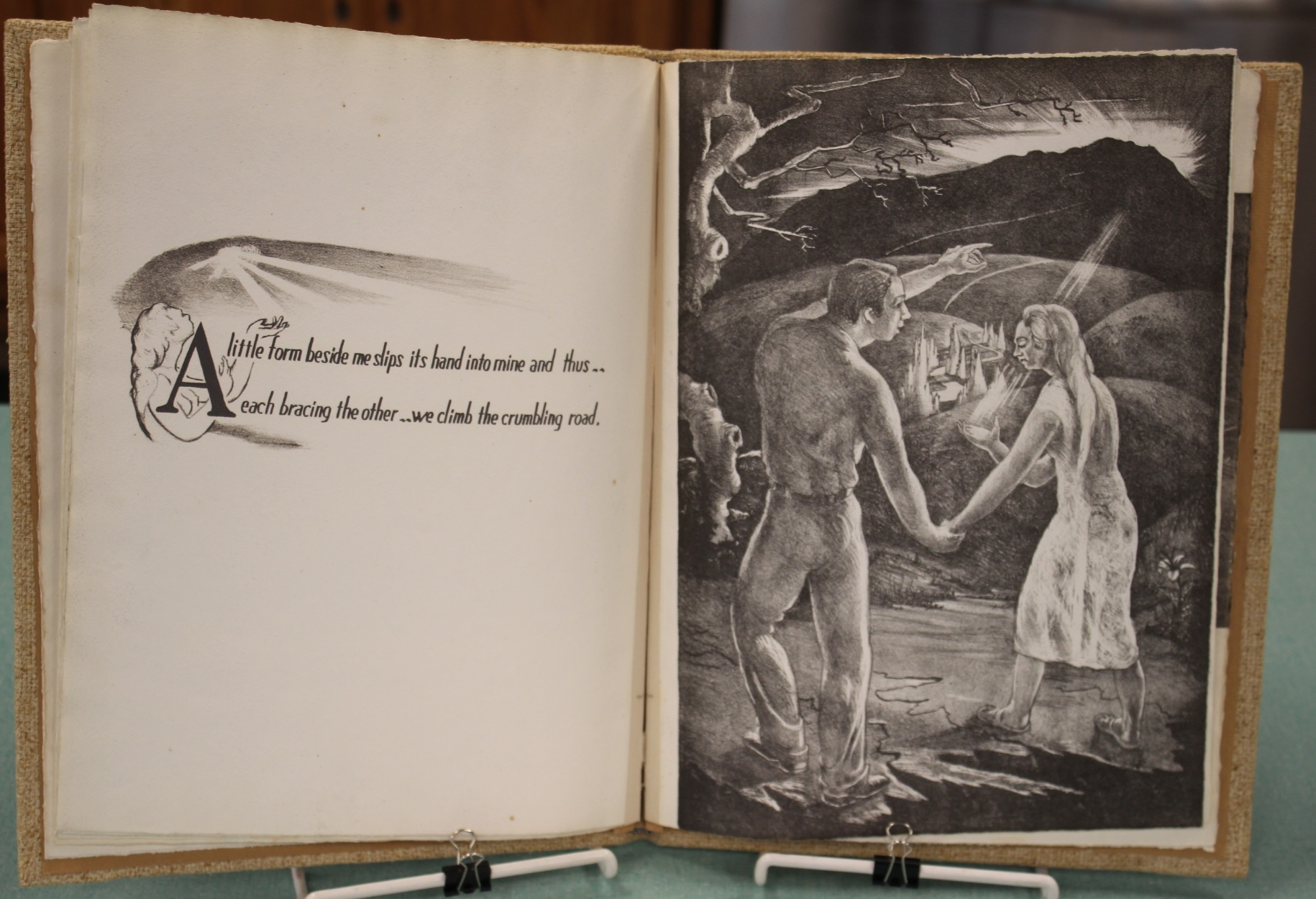
My Road (1941) by Duard Marshall, handmade book, with eight lithographs.

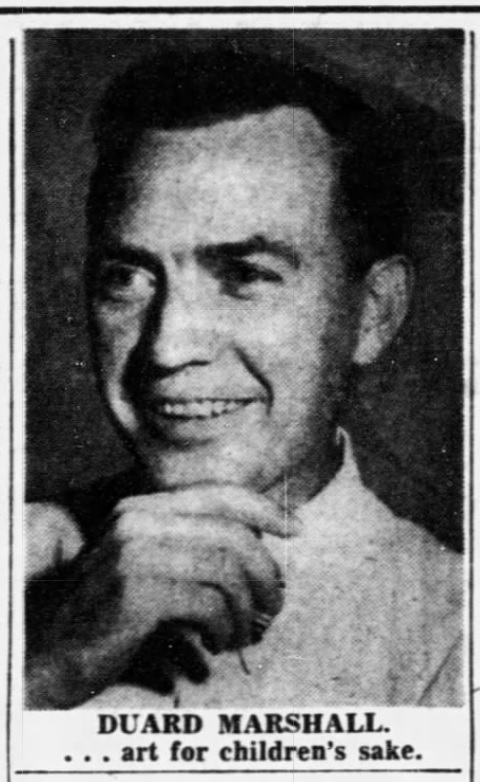
Duard Marshall in 1951.

== Art career ==
Marshall was very active exhibiting his work in the 1930s and 1940s. For example, he was represented in at least 10 shows in 1940. World War II did interrupt his art career, but following the war he became active in the Denver, Colorado, art scene, participating in the groundbreaking "15 Colorado Arts" show at the Denver Art Museum in 1948. Marshall remained in Denver until 1952 after which he become the director of the Fort Worth (Texas) Children's Museum. He also was an art instructor at Texas Wesleyan College (now Texas Wesleyan University). In 1954, Marshall took a two-year assignment to work for the United States Special Services Division in Germany, teaching art to soldiers of the US Army. After his initial enlistment, Marshall remained in Germany until 1960. In 1956, Marshall exhibited his block print Tourist in Munich at the Knickerbocker Show at the National Arts Club in New York City and the Beaumont Art Museum, now called the Art Museum of Southeast Texas in Beaumont, Texas. In 1960, Marshall returned to Kansas City to help Thomas Hart Benton prepare his mural "Independence and the Opening of the West" in the Truman Library. Marshall also assisted Benton prepare his murals for the New York Power Authority. Back in Kansas City, Marshal made his living doing art restoration, continuing to create art, but not exhibiting very often. In his last years, he went to live with his daughter in Lumberton, New Jersey, where he died in 2010.

Marshall has been included in two important retrospective group shows. The 1993 "Under the Influence: the Students of Thomas Hart Benton" exhibition at the Albrecht-Kemper Museum of Art in St. Joseph, Missouri assembled more than 50 artists who studied with Benton, including Marshall. This show also resulted in an important book-length catalog by museum curator Marianne Bernardi and academic art historian Henry Adams which dedicates three full pages to Marshall. The 2011 "15 Colorado Artists" show at Kirkland Museum of Fine & Decorative Art in Denver, Colorado attempted to reconstitute the groundbreaking 1948 show of the 15 Colorado Artists group. Hugh Grant and Deb Wadsworth, both long involved in the work of the Kirkland Museum and the Colorado arts scene, produced an eight-page color-illustrated article in American Art Review covering the 2011 show.

In 2021, the Neosho Arts Council sponsored a lecture on Duard Marshall and an exhibition of his work at the Neosho Newton County Library, which houses Marshall's 1939 Neosho centennial mural. Guest speaker Daniel Paul Morrison discussed Marshall's biography and art career. A total of seven works were exhibited (in addition to the centennial mural): one oil on canvas, "Missouri Landscape" (1938); two watercolors, "Colorado Landscape" (1940) and "Kansas Wheat Harvest" (1970); one lithograph, "Going Home (1946); two block prints, "Tourist in Munich" (1956) and "At Bat" (1971); and My Road, Marshall's 1941 handmade book with eight lithographs. This was the largest single public exhibition of Marshall's work since the 1940s. "Colorado Landscape" and My Road are part of the collection of the Longwell Museum at Crowder College. All other works are in private collections.

== Neosho Centennial Mural ==
Marshall's most well-known and often-seen work is his Neosho Centennial Mural in the Neosho Newton County Library, in Neosho, Missouri. Consisting of three canvas panels, each seven feet by ten feet, the mural shows the history of the county seat of Newton County from its first settlement in 1839. Initially, civic leaders approached Thomas Hart Benton, who was then on the faculty at the Kansas City Art Institute to prepare the mural which was intended for the new Newtown County courthouse. But Benton's many obligations caused him to decline the offer and suggest in his stead his student, Duard Marshall. And the mural, after being exhibited out-of-doors during the annual Harvest Festival, found its home in the local library, which at that time was housed in the Municipal Hall. Marshall painted the mural in the Haas Building on the Neosho courthouse square in about two months. Marshall was paid $500 for the commission and the mural was first exhibited on September 27, 1939, during the town's centennial celebration.

Foreground figures, from left to right: Two Osage Indians; B. J. Pearman, long-time Neosho city marshal posing as a Union soldier; unknown individual posing as Confederate soldier; Helen Mitchell Marshall, wife of Duard Marshall; perhaps George Washington Carver, who lived in Neosho during his schooldays, but did not smoke a pipe; Paul Hays honing a scythe; Congressman Maecenas Eason Benton, Thomas Hart Benton's father; Congressman M. C. M. Shartel, who represented Newton County at the time the mural was created; William H. Buehler posing as a WWI doughboy; Kenneth Smith, 13, of Neosho; and Mary Louise Stephens.

The mural was not in pristine condition. It was housed in the Municipal Auditorium for 68 years until it was removed in 2007 and reinstalled in the Neosho Newton County Library in 2008. While in the Municipal Auditorium, it was exposed to soot and cooking grease. A portion was cut out to make way for a vent. In 2021, the Neosho Arts Council engaged an art conservator to examine the mural and make a report regarding its treatment. The Council soliciting donations for the mural's restoration. In total, $15,000 was raised and the mural was clean and restored by a conservator in Kansas City. On November 29, 2022, the mural was official welcomed back at the Neosho Newton County Library with a public reception.

== Exhibitions ==
- 1935: Fayetteville Daily Democrat Building. One man show in lobby.
- 1937: Kansas State Teachers College, Emporia. Group show of students of James H. FitzGerald of KCAI.
- 1937: Country Club Annual Art Fair. Marshall wins third prize in the watercolor division.
- 1937: Washington County (Arkansas) Fair.
- 1938: Mid-Western Art Gallery, Kansas City, Kansas.
- 1940: San Francisco Water Color Annual.
- 1940: Arkansas Water Color Society, Shreveport, Louisiana, State Capitol. Purchase prize for “Lost Grandeur."
- 1940: Midwestern Artists’ Exhibition. Kansas City Art Institute. Lithograph titled “The Once Had Leaves.”
- 1941: One-man show. University of Arkansas, Fayetteville.
- 1942: Midwestern Artists’ Exhibition. Kansas City Art Institute. “Colorado Landscape” lithograph.
- 1946: Seventh annual exhibition of the American Color Print Society, Print Club, Philadelphia. Marshall receives honorable mention for “Winter”.
- 1952: Terry National Art Exhibit. Dinner Key Auditorium, Miami, Florida.
- 1960: Sun Carnival Art Exhibit (El Paso, Texas). Entered “Winter” a lithograph from 1946.
- 1993: Under the Influence: the Students of Thomas Hart Benton. Albrecht-Kemper Art Museum, St. Joseph, Missouri.
- 2011: 15 Colorado Artists. Vance Kirkland Museum, Denver, Colorado.
- 2012: Colorado on Paper: Watercolors, Prints, and Drawings from the Moffett Collection. Albrecht-Kemper Art Museum, St. Joseph, Missouri. Included three works by Marshall: "Leadville, Colorado," "Christmas in Colorado," and "Litho Shop."
- 2021: Neosho Arts Council organized a lecture by Daniel Paul Morrison on Marshall and an exhibition of seven works by Marshall, at the Neosho Newton County Library, in Neosho, Missouri.
- 2022: Centennial Mural is reinstalled in the Neosho City County Library after a $15,000 restoration project.

== Public collections ==
Works of art by Duard Marshall are held in a number of public collections.

- The Neosho Newton County Library: Neosho, Missouri. 1 mural (commission 1939).
- The Longwell Museum of Crowder College: Neosho, Missouri. 1 watercolor, 1 handmade book with 8 lithographs (accessions 1981, 1988).
- The Wolfsonian-FIU: Miami, Florida. 6 prints (accessions in 1984, 1986, 1993).
- The Albrecht-Kemper Museum of Art: St. Joseph, Missouri. 1 lithograph (accession 1993).
- The National Gallery of Art: Washington, DC. 2 lithograph (accession 2008).
- The Kirkland Museum of Fine & Decorative Art: Denver, Colorado. 1 oil, 2 watercolors, 1 gouache, 1 ink on paper, 1 lithograph (accessions in 2009, 2011, 2012, 2021).
- The Denver Public Library: Denver, Colorado. 1 pen and ink on paper (accession 2018).
- The Ashby-Hodge Gallery of Central Methodist University: Fayette, Missouri. 1 watercolor and 1 woodcut (accession 1992), 1 tempera (accession 2018).
