= List of mayors of Joplin, Missouri =

Joplin, Missouri mayors

The following is a list of mayors of the city of Joplin, Missouri, United States.

- Elliot R. Moffett, 1873
- Lee Taylor, 1873–1874
- Patrick Murphy, 1875
- F.J. Thompson, 1876
- Frank E. Williams, 1877–1878
- F.M. Roberts, 1879
- W.E. Maynard, 1880–1881
- Galen Spencer, 1882–1883
- W.B. Halyard, 1884, 1893–1894
- A.B. McCarthy, 1885–1886
- J.L. Briggs, 1887
- C. Livingston, 1888
- R.B. Tyler, 1889–1892
- E.D. Porter, 1895–1896
- Tom W. Cunningham, 1897–1898, 1903–1904
- J.H. Spencer, 1899–1900
- John C. Trigg, 1901–1902
- C.W. Lyon, 1905–1906
- Jesse F. Osborne, 1907–1908, 1911–1913, 1918–1922, 1926
- Guy Humes, 1909–1910
- Hugh McIndoe, 1914–1917
- C.S. Poole, 1917–1918
- F. Taylor Snapp, c.1922–1926
- Charles A. Patterson, 1926–1936
- A.C. Maher, 1936–1938
- O.P. Mahoney, 1938–1941
- John M. Temples, 1941–1946
- L. Russel McKee, c.1946
- H. Chris Oltman, c.1951–1954
- Freeman R. Johnson, c.1955–1957
- C. C. Haynes, c.1962–1967
- Lena G. Beal, c.1973
- Jack M. Belden, c.1978–1981
- Joanna Kay Wells, c. 1984-1985
- Ron Richard, 1994–1997
- Darieus Adams, c.2001
- Melodee Colbert-Kean, c.2013
- Ryan Stanley, c. 2020–2022
- Doug Lawson, c.2022–2024
- Keenan Cortez, c.2024–2026
- Robert O'Brian, c.2026

== See also ==
- Joplin history
