= Allen Barbre =

American football player (born 1984)

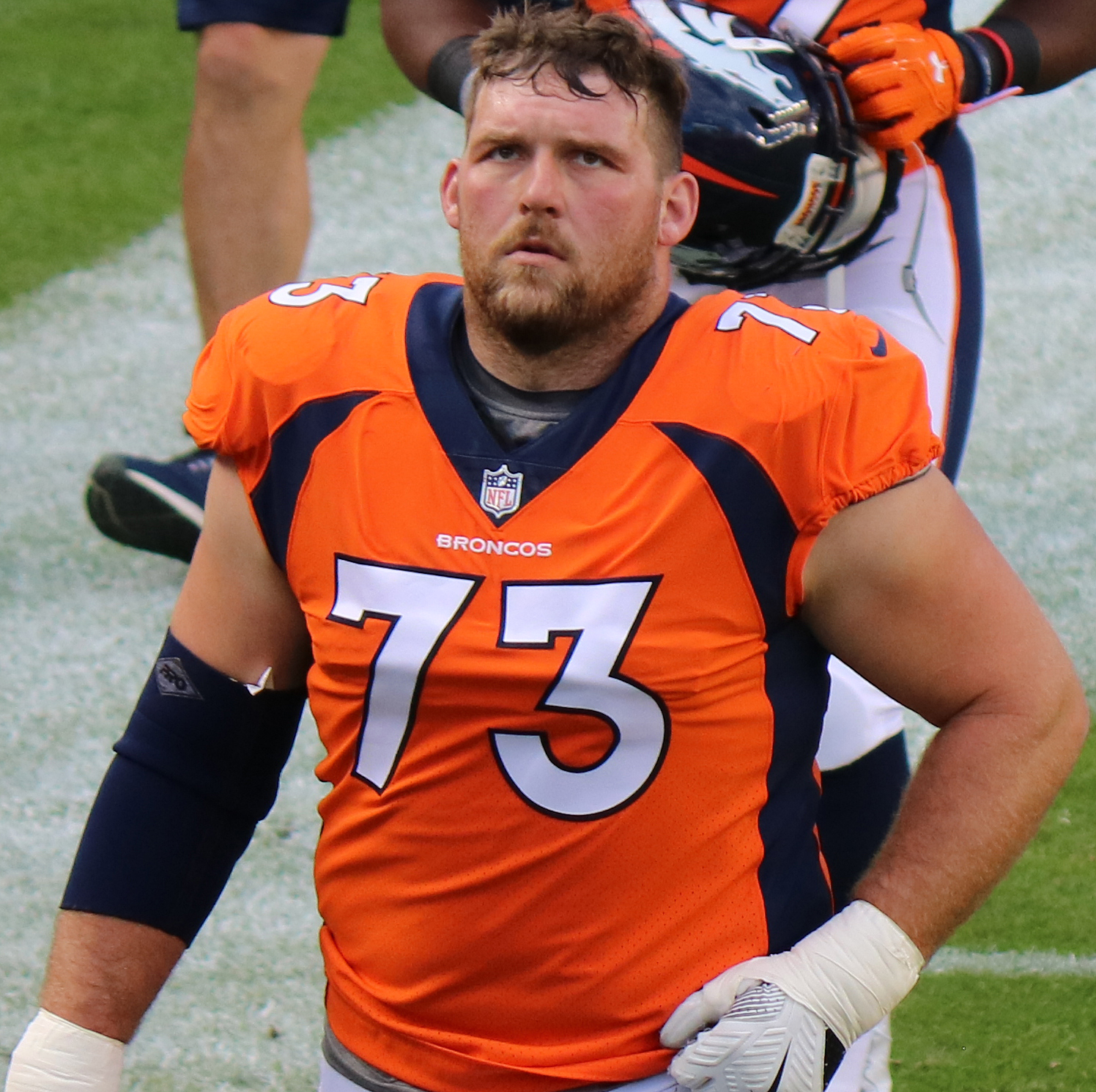
- Barbre with the Denver Broncos in 2017

No. 78, 67, 76, 73
- Position: Offensive guard

Personal information
- Born: June 22, 1984 (age 42); Neosho, Missouri, U.S.
- Listed height: 6 ft 4 in (1.93 m)
- Listed weight: 310 lb (141 kg)

Career information
- High school: East Newton County (Granby, Missouri)
- College: Missouri Southern (2003–2006)
- NFL draft: 2007: 4th round, 119th overall pick

Career history
- Green Bay Packers (2007–2009); Seattle Seahawks (2010); Miami Dolphins (2010); Seattle Seahawks (2011–2012); Philadelphia Eagles (2013–2016); Denver Broncos (2017)

Career NFL statistics
- Games played: 92
- Games started: 40
- Fumble recoveries: 1
- Stats at Pro Football Reference

Allen Wade Barbre (born June 22, 1984) is an American former professional football player who was an offensive guard in the National Football League (NFL). He was selected by the Green Bay Packers in the fourth round of the 2007 NFL draft. He played college football for the Missouri Southern Lions. He was also a member of the Seattle Seahawks, Miami Dolphins, Philadelphia Eagles, and Denver Broncos.

== College career ==
Barbre was a consensus All-American, All-MIAA and All-Region first-team selection in 2006. He helped lead an offensive line that saw quarterback Adam Hinspeter become just the second passer in school history to throw for 2,000 yards twice in a career. The offense amassed 3,461 yards for the season, including 2,527 passing. He finished with a career-high 94 knockdowns at left tackle and also excelled on the punt coverage unit, coming up with seven solo tackles.

Barbre was Southern's first All-American since Josh Chapman in 2002, and was the first to be named First-team since Richard Jordan in 1996. He was the fifth offensive lineman at Southern to be named First-team All-American joining the likes of Terron Jackson (1972), Willie Williams (1976), Joel Tupper (1982) and Yancy McNight (1995). He was the ninth Lion overall to be named First-team All-American.

For his career, Barbre started 33 of 37 contests. All but one of those starting assignments came at the demanding left tackle position. He was credited with 254 knockdown blocks and registered ten tackles (9 solos) on special teams. He was the first player from Southern to be invited to the NFL Combine.

== Professional career ==
Pre-draft measurables
Height	Weight	Arm length	Hand span	40-yard dash	10-yard split	20-yard split	20-yard shuttle	Three-cone drill	Vertical jump	Broad jump	Bench press
6 ft 4 in (1.93 m)	300 lb (136 kg)	33 1/2 in (0.85 m)	10 1/2 in (0.27 m)	4.88 s	1.72 s	2.85 s	4.63 s	7.40 s	32.0 in (0.81 m)	8 ft 9 in (2.67 m)	28 reps
All values from NFL Combine

=== Green Bay Packers ===
Barbre was the highest-ever drafted player to come out of Missouri Southern until Brandon Williams. He joined Richard Jordan (1997) and Jim Hoots (1971) both of whom went in the seventh round, as the only players to be drafted from the school. Barbre joined current NFL and Southern alums Rod Smith (Denver Broncos) and James Thrash (Washington Redskins) as one of three former Lions in the NFL.

In three seasons with the Packers, Barbre struggled to find a role on the team. Originally tried at left guard for two seasons, Barbre failed to earn a starting spot and was tried at right tackle for the 2009 season. Barbre began the season as the starter, but was ineffective and soon removed from the starting lineup. He was waived by the Packers on September 6, 2010.

=== Seattle Seahawks (first stint) ===
Barbre signed with the Seattle Seahawks on September 28, 2010. He played in three games before being waived on November 23, 2010.

=== Miami Dolphins ===
Barbre was signed by the Miami Dolphins on December 28, 2010. He was placed on injured reserve on August 30, 2011, and released on September 6, 2011. He did not appear in any games for the Dolphins.

=== Seattle Seahawks (second stint) ===
Barbre signed with the Seahawks again on November 24, 2011, and played in four games for the team during the 2011 season. He was suspended for the first four games of the 2012 season for violating the NFL's performance enhancing drugs policy. Once his suspension ended, Barbre was released by the Seahawks on October 1, 2012.

=== Philadelphia Eagles ===
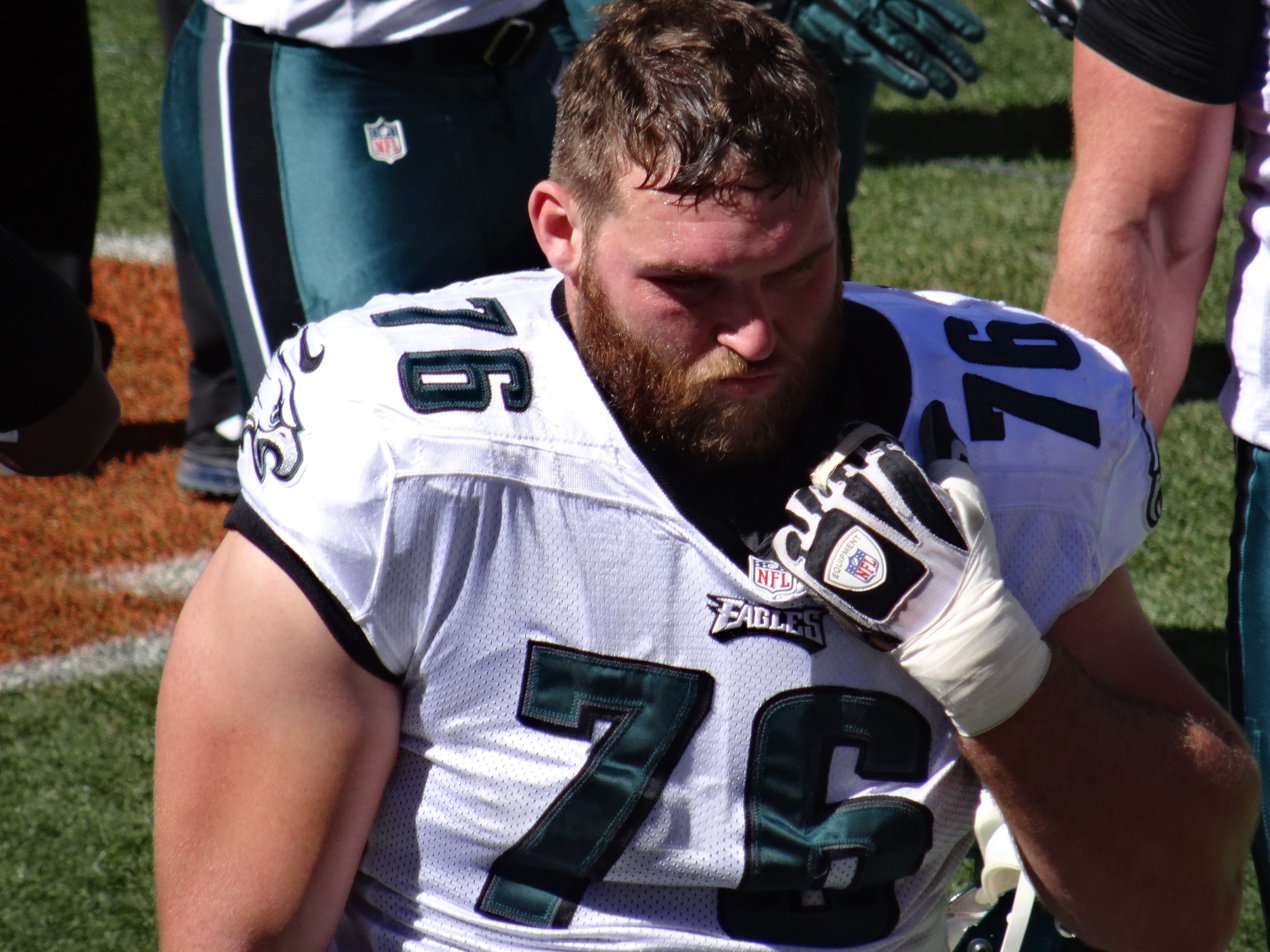
Barbre with the Philadelphia Eagles in 2013

Barbre signed with the Eagles in 2013. He played left tackle against the Packers in week 10 when starter Jason Peters was injured. Barbre played effectively and was the top reserve offensive lineman for the remainder of the season.

On June 3, 2014, Barbre signed a 3-year extension with the Eagles. Barbre suffered a season ending ankle injury in the opener on September 7, 2014 against the Jacksonville Jaguars. He was placed on injured reserve on September 9.

In 2015, Barbre started all 16 games for the Philadelphia Eagles. Under new coach Doug Pederson in 2016, Barbre won the starting left guard position.

=== Denver Broncos ===
On July 26, 2017, the Eagles traded Barbre to the Denver Broncos for a 2019 conditional late round draft pick. He played in all 16 games with four starts at right tackle in 2017 for the Broncos.
