= Rod Jetton =

American politician

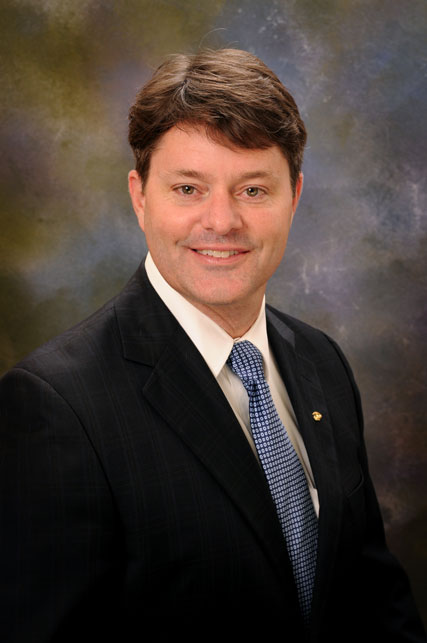

70th Speaker of the Missouri House of Representatives
- In office 2005–2009
- Preceded by: Catherine Hanaway
- Succeeded by: Ron Richard

Personal details
- Born: September 9, 1967 (age 59) De Soto, Missouri, U.S.
- Party: Republican
- Education: Southwest Baptist University

Rod Jetton (born September 9, 1967) is an American politician, author, and businessman. He served as a Republican member of the Missouri House of Representatives who represented Missouri's 156th District from 2001 to 2009 and was Speaker of the Missouri House of Representatives from 2005 to 2009. Jetton has authored four books about biblical teachings and how to recover from personal crisis.

== Personal ==
Jetton is a member of Veterans of Foreign Wars (VFW) Post 5900, the American Legion, Farm Bureau, National Rifle Association of America and National Federation of Independent Business. The Bollinger County Chamber of Commerce gave him the "One Year VIP Business Achievement Award" in 1998 for his leadership and service to the community.

He was married to the former Cassandra (Cassie) James from 1988 until their divorce in October 2009. He has three children, Callie, Elaine and Will. Jetton told The Southeast Missourian newspaper in July 2011 that he had remarried and is working for civil engineering company in Poplar Bluff, Missouri. He also serves as a contributing blogger for a political website, The Recovering Politician, and has written several books.

In 2017, Jetton moved to Greece to pursue a Master of Arts degree at the University of Macedonia. The master's program focused on the politics and economics of eastern and southeastern Europe with sections on the how refugees are impacting the European Union

Jetton is a member of the evangelical Christian group, Gideons International.

== Early life ==
Jetton was born in De Soto, Missouri, to Bill and Judy Jetton. His father is a Southern Baptist minister. Jetton graduated from Charleston High School in 1986 and from Southwest Baptist University in Bolivar, Missouri in May 1990, with a double major in history and political science and was student body president his senior year.

After graduating, Jetton joined the United States Marine Corps and served as an Infantry Officer for four years. He was stationed at Camp Lejeune, North Carolina and was involved in the Bosnia and Somalia operations. After finishing his tour in 1995, Jetton received an honorable discharge.

After leaving the Marine Corps, Jetton started Jetton James Real Estate Company.

== Political career ==
=== Bollinger County Commissioner ===
After college, Jetton joined Congressman Bill Emerson's campaign team as a field coordinator, and gained valuable experience in local grass roots politics. In 1996, he was elected to the Bollinger County Commission. He was the youngest County Commissioner in the state at that time During his time as County Commissioner, Jetton worked with other commissioners to eliminate the county's $350,000 debt within his first term.

=== Speaker of the House ===
In 2000, Jetton was elected to the Missouri House of Representatives where he served until 2009, when term limits required that he leave the legislature. In his second term, he was chosen Speaker pro Tempore of the Missouri House. On January 5, 2005, he was sworn in as the 70th Speaker of the Missouri House of Representatives. He served on the Agriculture, Judicial, Banking, and Natural Resources committees.

In 2002, Jetton led political efforts for the minority Republican caucus. He assisted in re-drawing House legislative districts and developing plans to recruit and train Republican candidates. These efforts contributed to the Republicans picking up fourteen new seats and establishing a majority for the first time in 48 years.

As speaker, he proposed and passed rules changes giving the minority equal debate time and establishing other policies that more evenly distributed power between the House minority and majority. These changes were opposed by some elements of his own party.

In Jetton's first term as speaker he launched Common Sense Conservative Consulting which advised some people who were seeking legislation in the state. The Missouri State Ethics Commission said it was a legal but questionable practice.

In 2007, he unintentionally voted for a rider to repeal Missouri's law banning gay sex. The rider was attached to a Jessica's Law bill. Jetton said he did not know about the rider. While Jetton acknowledged the ban was unenforceable because of the Supreme Court's Lawrence v. Texas ruling, he said, "Thanks to that deletion, it is now legal to engage in deviate sexual intercourse with someone of the same sex here in Missouri." In response, Jetton removed state representative Scott A. Lipke of Jackson, Missouri, as chair of the Committee on Crime Prevention and Public Safety because he thought Lipke should have told lawmakers about the rider.

In 2007, Jetton proposed and passed one of Missouri's largest tax cuts. The cut eliminated taxes on Social Security benefits.

During his tenure he helped to convert a $600 million deficit into a $500 million surplus. Jetton also increased nutrition program funding during his time in the House and was an advocate for Missouri's ethanol fuel mandate and the development of Missouri ethanol plants.

==== 2009 assault arrest ====
On December 7, 2009, Jetton was charged with felony assault related to an incident that occurred on November 15, 2009, in which Jetton allegedly "recklessly caused serious physical injury" to an unnamed woman.

Jetton originally met the accuser while attending high school in Charleston Missouri. The woman reported that she had renewed contact with Jetton via Facebook to push for legislation on behalf of victims of sexual abuse spurred by her affiliation with the Rape, Abuse & Incest National Network. The initial reconnection was followed by what both parties described as flirtatious or sexual communication over the phone and text messages. Jetton's lawyer in a February 24, 2010 hearing released text messages from the woman implying that she might be open to rough sex. The woman at the hearing said the texts were meant to be playful and had been taken out of context, however it has been shown that she and Jetton established a safeword of "green balloons", a common practice when engaging in sadomasochistic sex.

According to the complaint Jetton met the woman, with whom he had previously engaged in "rough sex", on November 15 and 16, 2009 in Sikeston, Missouri to have sadomasochistic sex. The woman said that she began 'fading' in and out and remembered losing consciousness several times" after drinking a glass of wine that Jetton had prepared for her. He is accused of "hitting her on the head and choking her, resulting in unconsciousness and the loss of the function of a part of her body" during the encounter. The woman claimed that her hands had been bound during a segment of the encounter and that she had struggled against the restraints, but photos of her wrists after the incident did not show any bruising on her wrists. Jetton is accused of telling the woman the following morning, "You should have said 'green balloons," a reference to the safeword they had established before meeting as a safety measure.

The woman reported the case two days after the incident. The Missouri Highway Patrol initially recommended that the accuser file rape and assault charges against Jetton, however this recommendation was dropped after the accuser's story changed and investigators examined text messages that had been sent between the accuser and Jetton. It was also found that the accuser had a history of filing sexual assault charges and restraining orders before dropping them. While seeking full custody of his children, the accuser's ex-husband was quoted as saying that the accuser, who had attempted to file a restraining order against him, "suffers from various and sundry mental diseases and defects" and "is at risk of exposing the minor children to inappropriate behavior on her part and that of men with whom she continues to have casual sexual relationships with."

Following the arrest he closed Rod Jetton & Associate, which catered to many high-profile clients, including Mitt Romney.

A trial on the case moved from October 2010 to February 3, 2011. and then to June 2, 2011. In May 2011 it was reported that he pleaded guilty to misdemeanor assault, was placed on probation. He is to pay $950 in restitution, and $300 in court costs.

==== 2010 bribery investigation ====
In early 2010 various state officials said they testified before a grand jury investigation in the United States District Court for the Western District of Missouri in Kansas City. Some of those testifying said they questioning the handling of a 2005 bill regulating adult entertainment. The bill introduced by Matt Bartle would have enacted a $5 per customer admission fee for strip clubs, adult movie houses and other sexually oriented businesses, along with a 20 percent tax on the revenue. After the bill was introduced a political action committee with connections to Jetton adviser Don Lograsso accepted a $35,000 donation from the adult entertainment industry.

Jetton assigned the bill to a committee chaired by Robert T. Johnson of Lee's Summit, Missouri and Johnson killed the bill. Jetton has said there was no quid pro quo and that he assigned the bill to an unfriendly committee because he did not like the bill.

The Grand Jury adjourned without filing any indictments. Missouri law says the statute of limitations is 5 years in bribery cases and 2010 was five years after the event took place.

=== Electoral history ===
2000 Republican Primary for Missouri's 156th District House of Representatives
Party	Candidate	Votes	%
Republican	Rod Jetton	1,800	55.76
Republican	Tim Slayton	1,428	44.24
Total votes		3,228	100

2000 General Election for Missouri's 156th District House of Representatives
Party	Candidate	Votes	%
Republican	Rod Jetton	8,281	57.5
Democratic	Katherine Golden	6,119	42.5
Total votes		14,400	100

2002 Republican Primary for Missouri's 156th District House of Representatives
Party	Candidate	Votes	%
Republican	Rod Jetton	0	100
Total votes		0	100

2002 General Election for Missouri's 156th District House of Representatives
Party	Candidate	Votes	%
Republican	Rod Jetton	0	100
Total votes		0	100

2004 Republican Primary for Missouri's 156th District House of Representatives
Party	Candidate	Votes	%
Republican	Rod Jetton	0	100
Total votes		0	100

2004 General Election for Missouri's 156th District House of Representatives
Party	Candidate	Votes	%
Republican	Rod Jetton	10,031	65.08
Democratic	John Howser	5,383	34.92
Total votes		15,414	100

2006 Republican Primary for Missouri's 156th District House of Representatives
Party	Candidate	Votes	%
Republican	Rod Jetton	0	100
Total votes		0	100

2006 General Election for Missouri's 156th District House of Representatives
Party	Candidate	Votes	%
Republican	Rod Jetton	7,503	56.51
Democratic	Michael Winder	5,774	43.49
Total votes		13,277	100

== Post-Politics ==
After leaving politics, Jetton fell into financial trouble, stating "I got an application in to drive a garbage truck, and I got turned down to sell appliances, ... I've got no reputation. I have no money. I've got nothing" to Tony Messenger of the St. Louis Post-Dispatch. These difficulties were eventually rectified when he joined Schultz Surveying and Engineering Inc. He has since continued to have a career in content marketing and crisis management. He has also become the author of several books on biblical teachings and how to recover from personal crisis.

Jetton attributed his failings to alcoholism, disconnection from his faith, and a lack of balance in his life. He has said that his time in the House of Representatives was a hectic self-indulgent period, that increasingly led him to a lifestyle standing in opposition to his personal beliefs. The restoration of personal Christian values and a more balanced lifestyle are reoccurring themes in his writing. He has credited support from his family and his returning faith in God for helping him to rebuild his life.

=== Schultz Surveying and Engineering Inc. ===
Jetton was the director of marketing for Schultz Surveying and Engineering Inc. from 2010 to 2013. During this period, the company made the Inc. 500/5000 list three times, increased federal revenue from $800,000 in 2009 to over $3 million by 2011, and reached #54th on the ZweigWhite Hot Firm's List, making it the second fastest growing engineering company in Missouri to be placed on the ZweigWhite Hot Firm's List. The company's owners, attributed much of the company's success to Jetton's aggressive marketing efforts, especially the customer database he created, the revisions he made to the company's website, and the contact plan that he helped to develop. For his work, Jetton was recognized as the top marketing director in Southwest Missouri by the Springfield Business Journal.

=== Missouri Times ===
In 2013 Jetton co-founded The Missouri Times, a newspaper intended to report on Jefferson City politics in an unbiased and bipartisan manner. The paper was marketed to lobbyists, political insiders, trade associations, and others involved directly with the Missouri political process; to that end, the newspaper featured a lobbyist, trade association, or staffer in every issue. The paper was presented both online and in printed form.

=== Second Act Strategies ===
Jetton is a partner in Second Act Strategies, an organization that provides team building seminars focused on crisis management. The seminars are led by a bipartisan collection of "recovering" political figures, who have experienced professional crises. Instruction, based on The Recovering Politician's Twelve Step Program to Survive Crisis, leads participants through a simulated crisis scenario that is developed based on an organization's specific mission and culture. The skills presented during the seminars include: crisis assessment techniques, resource planning, on-camera media and message development training, ethics instruction, advice on building strategic alliances with opinion leaders and repairing reputation damage, leadership training on how to remove emotion from decisions during high-stakes-crisis situations, strategies to rebuild trust post-crisis, and online strategies for crisis diffusion.

=== Targeted Communications ===
In 2012, Jetton opened Targeted Communications, a content marketing company that focuses on connecting with customers and building customer relations. Targeted Communications assists with the development of digital marketing strategies and the authorship of targeted content. Their speciality is the development of contact plans that assist with customer acquisition, retention, and relations.

== Authorship ==
In 2013, Jetton co-authored The Recovering Politician's Twelve Step Program to Survive Crisis along with thirteen other authors. The book, featured on MSNBC's "Hardball with Chris Matthews" and HuffPost Live, featured a number of "recovering politicians" writing about how to manage personal crises. His first book was followed later in 2013 with Son of a Preacher Man: Growing up in the Seventies and Eighties, an autobiography that detailed Jetton's struggle when trying to follow the teachings of his father who was a Southern Baptist preacher. Success Can Kill You: One man's story of success, failure and forgiveness, published in 2014, explorers Jetton's political success and eventual disgrace; examining the causes of his behavior and his eventual return to Christian teachings. Jetton's 2016 book, Prayer Warrior Bootcamp, examines biblical teachings about prayer and prayer techniques. Cussing Christians, written in 2017, looks at biblical references to profanity.

=== Bibliography ===
Title	Year	ISBN
The Recovering Politician's Twelve Step Program to Survive Crisis	2013	978-0615819044
Son of a Preacher Man: Growing up in the Seventies and Eighties	2013	978-0991312603
Success Can Kill You: One Man's Story of Success, Failure and Forgiveness	2014	978-0991312627
Cussing Christians: We Love Jesus (but we cuss a little)	2017	978-0991312641
Prayer Warrior Bootcamp	2016	978-0991312634

== Awards ==
Award	Year	Organization
One Year VIP Business Achievement Award	1998	Bollinger County Chamber of Commerce
"Friend of Agriculture" Award	2002	Missouri Farm Bureau
"Friend of Agriculture" Award	2004	Missouri Farm Bureau
"Friend of Agriculture" Award	2006	Missouri Farm Bureau
Lewis & Clark Statesman Award	2003	Regional Chamber & Growth Association
Lewis & Clark Statesman Award	2005	Regional Chamber & Growth Association
Lewis & Clark Statesman Award	2008	Regional Chamber & Growth Association
"Spirit of Enterprise" Award	2003	Missouri Chamber of Commerce
Eagle Award	2003	Eagle Forum
Legislative Award	2005	St. Louis Business Journal
Legislative Award	2007	St. Louis Business Journal
Guardian of Small Business Award	2005	National Federation of Independent Businesses
Pachyderm of the Year	2005	Missouri Republican Party
Legislative Leadership Award	2006	Association of Missouri Electric Cooperatives
Legislator of the Year	2007	Missouri Retired Teacher Association
Distinguished Service to Missouri Bicycling Award	2008	Missouri Bicycle Federation
Top Marketing Director in Southwest Missouri	2011	Springfield Business Journal

Political offices
Preceded by Catherine Hanaway	Speaker of the Missouri House of Representatives; 2005–2009	Succeeded by Ron Richard
