= Crowder College =

Community college in Neosho, Missouri, U.S.

- Type: Public community college
- Established: 1963; 63 years ago
- President: Chett Daniel
- Students: 3,864
- Location: Neosho, Missouri, United States
- Mascot: Roughrider
- Website: www.crowder.edu

Crowder College is a public community college in Neosho, Missouri, United States. It serves the Community College District of Newton and McDonald counties in southwestern Missouri and other outlying areas. The school enrolled 3,864 in 2023.

Established in 1963 on the grounds of the former Fort Crowder, the college grants certificates, diplomas, and associate degrees. Its name honors General Enoch Crowder, a prominent Missourian, soldier, and statesman, as well as the veterans of World War I, who received their training at Fort Crowder.

== Accreditations ==
Crowder College is accredited by the Higher Learning Commission and approved by the Missouri Department of Elementary and Secondary Education and Coordinating Board for Higher Education. Specific programs are approved or accredited by the Missouri State Board of Nursing, Teacher Education Certification, through the Department of Elementary and Secondary Education, and the National Institute for Automotive Excellence (ASE).

Graduates of the Associate of Arts programs are admitted without examination to junior standing in all public universities and colleges in Missouri and many outside the state of Missouri. Crowder is a member of the Missouri Community College Association and the American Association of Community Colleges.

== Longwell Museum ==
The Longwell Museum, located in the Crowder College Elsie Plaster Community Center, has many displays and artifacts from the Fort Crowder days, when over 50,000 soldiers were stationed there. The museum also holds artwork by artists associated with Neosho, including Thomas Hart Benton and James Duard Marshall. In 1989, the Longwell Museum hosted the "Benton and Friends" exhibition in honor of the centennial of Thomas Hart Benton's birth. That exhibition brought together more than 80 works by Benton, John Steuart Curry, James Duard Marshall, Charles Banks Wilson, and Grant Wood.

== Solar team ==
Crowder's solar team designed and built the first solar powered vehicle to successfully complete a coast to coast journey across the United States in 1984. Since then Crowder has continued to distinguish itself in world and national solar energy competitions, most recently the Solar Decathlon in Washington, D.C., where the solar house entry from Crowder was selected as the "People's Choice" and placed 6th overall in the competition. Crowder was the only community college in the competition. This house is located on the Crowder campus. The Crowder campus also includes a wind powered turbine supplying energy to the MARET (Missouri Alternative & Renewable Energy Technology) Center.

== Notable people ==
- Aaron Ashby – professional baseball player
- Jalen Beeks – professional baseball player
- Jill Carter – politician
- Dirk Deaton – politician
- Sam Hilliard – professional baseball player
- Mike Kickham – professional baseball player
- Preston Lacy – actor, comedian, and writer
- Jacob Misiorowski - professional baseball player
- Gary Nodler – politician
- Alvin Robertson – professional basketball player
