= Jill Carter (Missouri politician) =

American politician

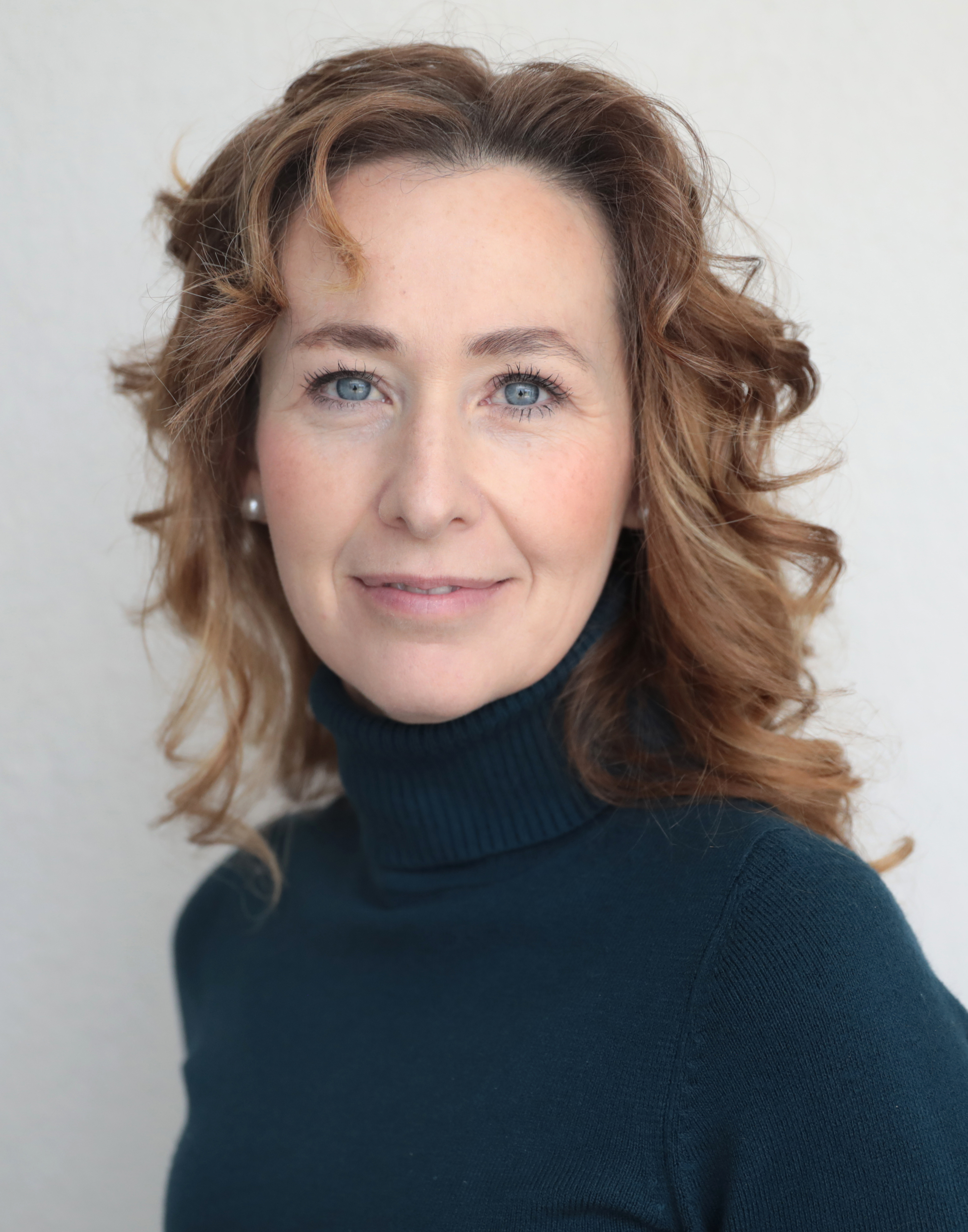

Member of the Missouri Senate from the 32nd district
- Incumbent
- Assumed office January 4, 2023
- Preceded by: Bill White

Personal details
- Party: Republican
- Education: Crowder College

Jill Carter is an American politician and activist serving as a member of the Missouri Senate for the 32nd district. Elected in November 2022, she assumed office on January 4, 2023.

== Education ==
Carter graduated from East Newton High School in Granby, Missouri, and Crowder College.

== Career ==
Outside of politics, Carter operates her family's farm. She is also an anti-abortion and gun rights activist. Carter is a member of The Church of Jesus Christ of Latter-day Saints and has participated in civic engagement activities involving Latter-day Saint youth and Missouri state government officials.

=== Senate ===
Carter was elected to the Missouri Senate in November 2022 and assumed office on January 4, 2023. She was initially a member of the Missouri Freedom Caucus, but left in May 2024 after the group staged a 41 hour filibuster on the Senate floor without results.

In 2023, Carter proposed legislation that would allow school districts to opt out of Missouri's school accreditation program.

In 2024, Carter sponsored legislation to impose environmental protections on meatpacking sludge.

In 2025, Carter sponsored legislation to add work requirements to state medicare. At the bill's hearing, there were no testimonies in favor, and opposition raised concerns that increased bureaucratic structure could further burden Missouri's ailing medicare offices and jeopardize care for the most vulnerable.

In 2026, Carter sponsored a bill to require Missouri voter lists, including each voters' date of birth and address, be published online. The bill would also expand powers of the Missouri Secretary of State office.
