= Granby, Missouri =

- City
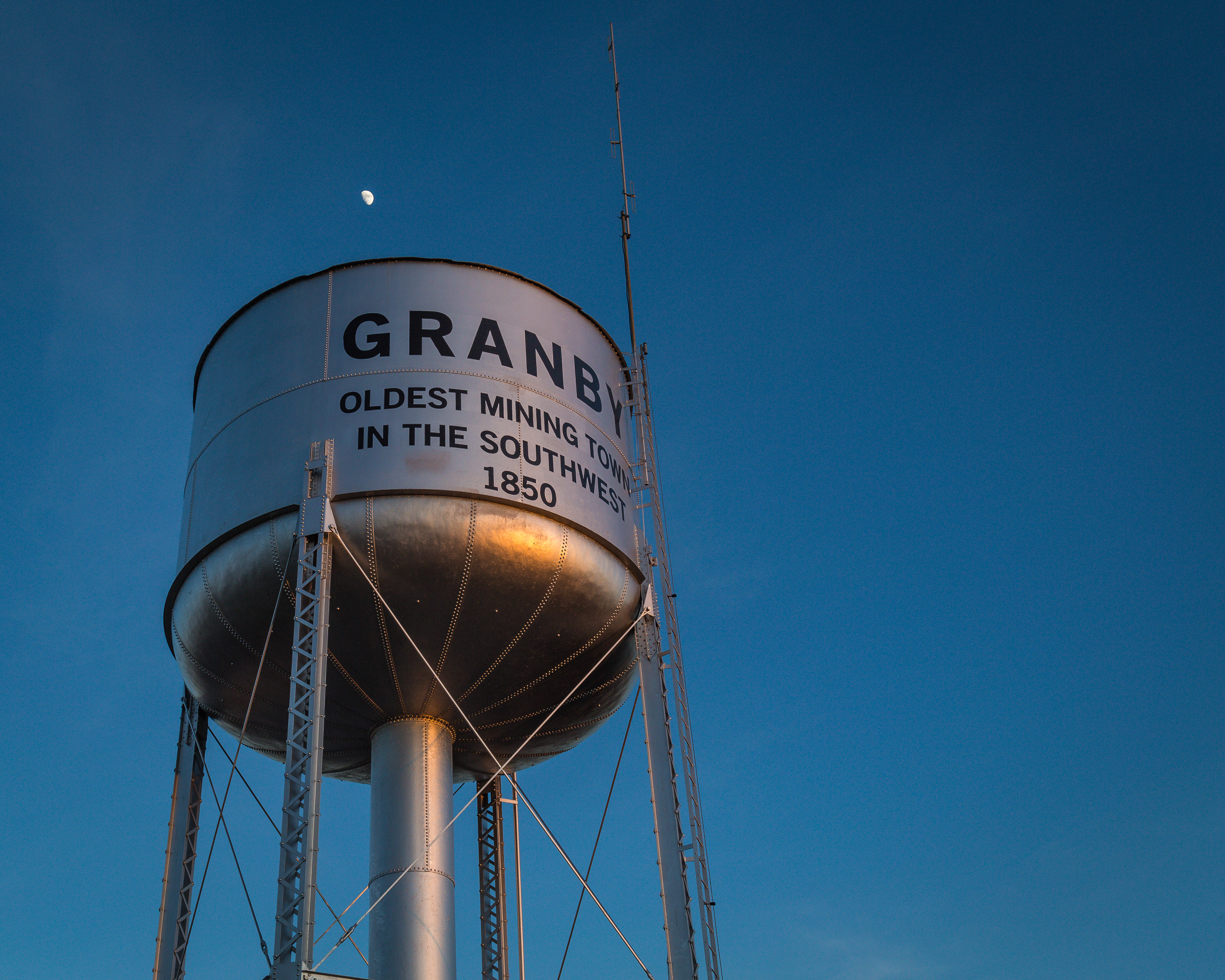
- Nickname: Oldest Mining Town in the Southwest
- Location of Granby, Missouri
- Coordinates: 36°55′04″N 94°15′39″W
- Country: United States
- State: Missouri
- County: Newton

Government
  - Mayor: Dustin Elder

Area
  - Total: 4.43 sq mi (11.47 km^{2})
  - Land: 4.42 sq mi (11.46 km^{2})
  - Water: 0.0039 sq mi (0.01 km^{2})
- Elevation: 1,171 ft (357 m)

Population (2020)
  - Total: 2,050
  - Estimate (2024): 2,097
  - Density: 463.4/sq mi (178.92/km^{2})
- Time zone: UTC-6 (Central (CST))
  - Summer (DST): UTC-5 (CDT)
- ZIP code: 64844
- Area code: 417
- FIPS code: 29-28108
- GNIS feature ID: 2394948
- Website: granby-mo.com

Granby is a city in Newton County, Missouri, United States. The population was 2,048 at the 2020 census. It is part of the Joplin, Missouri Metropolitan Statistical Area.

== History ==
In 1850, while traveling through Missouri on his way to St. Louis, Missouri, William Foster discovered galena ore while digging along Gum Spring Branch (Creek) on the property of settler Madison Vickery. Mr. Foster & Mr. Vickery opened the first shaft harvesting this ore, leading to the "Granby Stampede" two years later, a mine rush that populated the town. A post office was founded in Granby and has been in operation since 1856. The community took its name from Granby, Massachusetts.That same year, the towns first railroad tracks were laid. In 1857, Peter F. Blow and F. B. Kennett formed The Granby Mining and Smelting Company to smelt the mined lead. By 1859, Granby was a boom town of more than 8,000 people. The Granby Mining and Smelting Company lasted throughout most of the Civil War, held at various times by both Union and Confederate troops, until the Confederates finally blew up the furnaces to keep them out of Union hands.

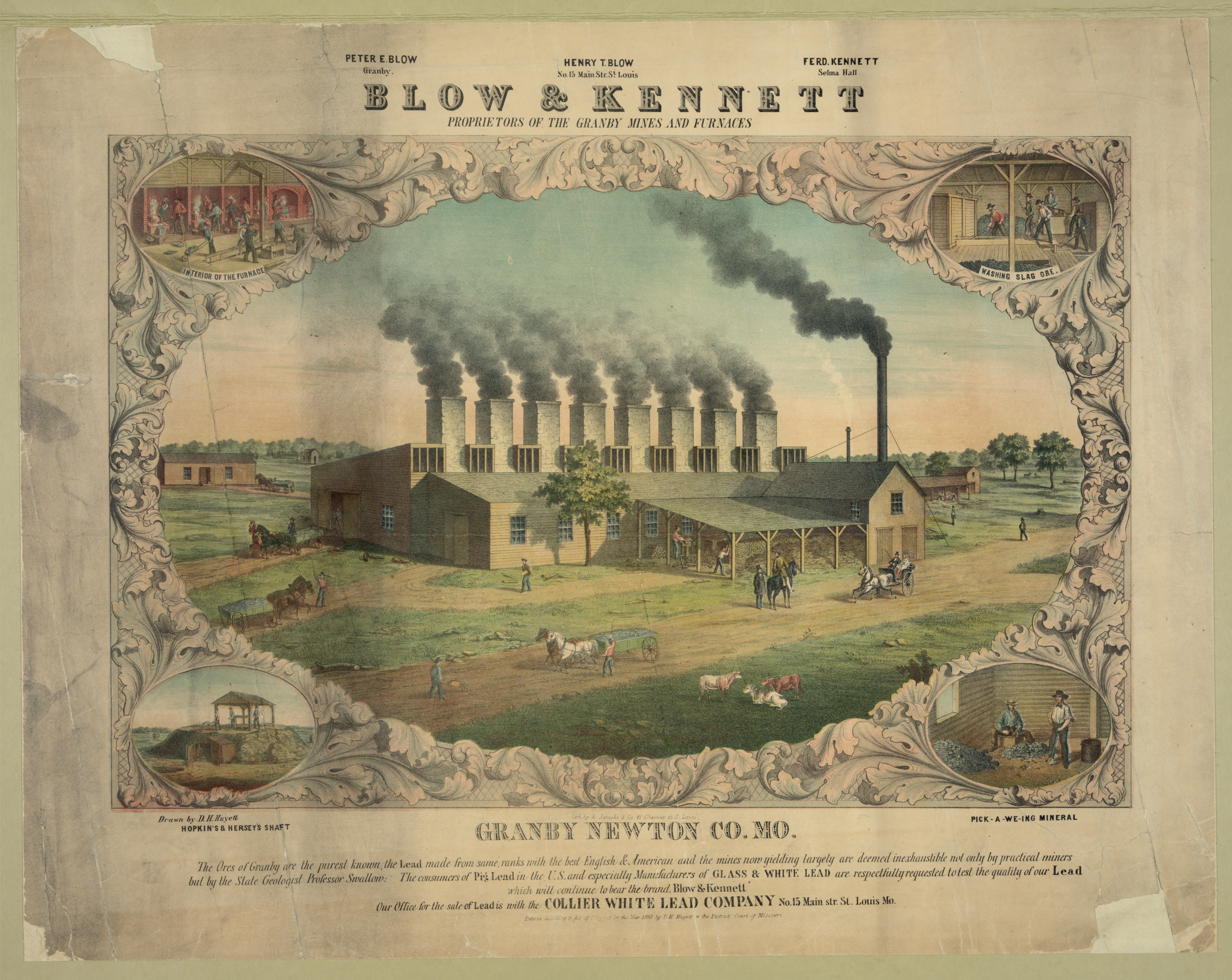
Blow & Kennett, Collier White Lead Co., Granby, Missouri,

Many residents fled the town after the Civil War occupations. The Granby Mining and Smelting Company was reorganized after the war by Henry Taylor Blow.

Mining was the chief industrial activity in Granby throughout the 19th century, with heavy concentrations of lead, zinc, galena, and calamine, Until the early 1950's when the ore, once thought to be inexhaustible, petered out. The company dissolved and shut down the mines.

== Demographics ==
Historical population
Census	Pop.	Note	%±
1880	1,882		—
1890	1,400		−25.6%
1900	1,400		0.0%
1910	2,315		65.4%
1920	2,442		5.5%
1930	1,736		−28.9%
1940	1,445		−16.8%
1950	1,455		0.7%
1960	1,670		14.8%
1970	1,808		8.3%
1980	1,678		−7.2%
1990	1,908		13.7%
2000	2,121		11.2%
2010	2,134		0.6%
2020	2,050		−3.9%
U.S. Decennial Census

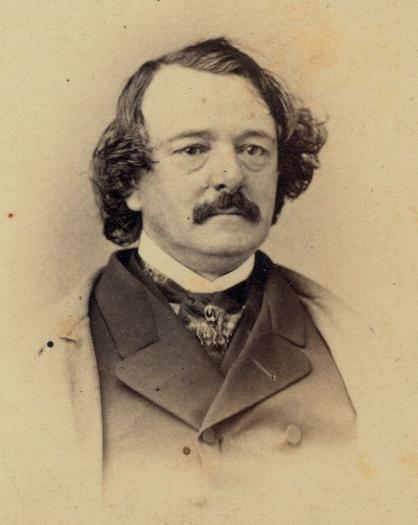
Henry Taylor Blow

=== 2020 census ===
As of the 2020 census, Granby had a population of 2,050. The median age was 39.2 years. 24.9% of residents were under the age of 18 and 19.4% were 65 years of age or older. For every 100 females there were 95.1 males, and for every 100 females age 18 and over there were 86.8 males.

Of residents, 0.0% lived in urban areas and 100.0% lived in rural areas.

There were 771 households, of which 32.9% had children under the age of 18 living in them. Of all households, 45.4% were married-couple households, 16.2% were households with a male householder and no spouse or partner present, and 28.9% were households with a female householder and no spouse or partner present. About 27.8% of all households were made up of individuals and 14.4% had someone living alone who was 65 years of age or older.

There were 873 housing units, of which 11.7% were vacant. The homeowner vacancy rate was 2.7% and the rental vacancy rate was 5.7%.

Racial composition as of the 2020 census
Race	Number	Percent
White	1,784	87.0%
Black or African American	6	0.3%
American Indian and Alaska Native	45	2.2%
Asian	7	0.3%
Native Hawaiian and Other Pacific Islander	7	0.3%
Some other race	13	0.6%
Two or more races	188	9.2%
Hispanic or Latino (of any race)	41	2.0%

=== 2010 census ===
As of the census of 2010, there were 2,134 people, 821 households, and 573 families living in the city. The population density was 482.8 inhabitants per square mile (186.4/km^{2}). There were 940 housing units at an average density of 212.7 per square mile (82.1/km^{2}). The racial makeup of the city was 92.5% White, 0.3% African American, 2.8% Native American, 1.1% Asian, 0.6% from other races, and 2.8% from two or more races. Hispanic or Latino of any race were 1.7% of the population.

There were 821 households, of which 36.4% had children under the age of 18 living with them, 48.0% were married couples living together, 15.8% had a female householder with no husband present, 6.0% had a male householder with no wife present, and 30.2% were non-families. 27.4% of all households were made up of individuals, and 11.5% had someone living alone who was 65 years of age or older. The average household size was 2.54 and the average family size was 3.05.

The median age in the city was 36 years. 28% of residents were under the age of 18; 9.2% were between the ages of 18 and 24; 23.2% were from 25 to 44; 24.4% were from 45 to 64; and 15.3% were 65 years of age or older. The gender makeup of the city was 48.8% male and 51.2% female.

=== 2000 census ===
As of the census of 2000, there were 2,121 people, 850 households, and 589 families living in the city. The population density was 478.1 inhabitants per square mile (184.6/km^{2}). There were 934 housing units at an average density of 210.5 per square mile (81.3/km^{2}). The racial makeup of the city was 95.57% White, 2.03% Native American, 0.14% Asian, 0.14% Pacific Islander, 0.52% from other races, and 1.60% from two or more races. Hispanic or Latino of any race were 0.94% of the population.

There were 850 households, out of which 31.5% had children under the age of 18 living with them, 51.4% were married couples living together, 13.1% had a female householder with no husband present, and 30.6% were non-families. 27.1% of all households were made up of individuals, and 13.3% had someone living alone who was 65 years of age or older. The average household size was 2.44 and the average family size was 2.93.

In the city the population was spread out, with 65.6% under the age of 18, 9.8% from 18 to 24, 26.8% from 25 to 44, 22.2% from 45 to 64, and 15.7% who were 65 years of age or older. The median age was 36 years. For every 100 females, there were 88.2 males. For every 100 females age 18 and over, there were 81.2 males.

The median income for a household in the city was $28,625, and the median income for a family was $32,455. Males had a median income of $26,515 versus $18,208 for females. The per capita income for the city was $13,371. About 13.0% of families and 16.1% of the population were below the poverty line, including 21.9% of those under age 18 and 17.3% of those age 65 or over.

== Education ==
Granby is a part of the East Newton R-6 School District

- Granby Intermediate School - K-4 & 5-8
- East Newton High School

== Culture ==
=== Old Mining Town Days ===
Old Mining Town Days is a summer festival held around the 4th of July, with vendors, games, rides, music, and fireworks. Celebrating the history of the town and birth of The Nation.

== Notable people ==
- Allen Barbre - NFL Football Player
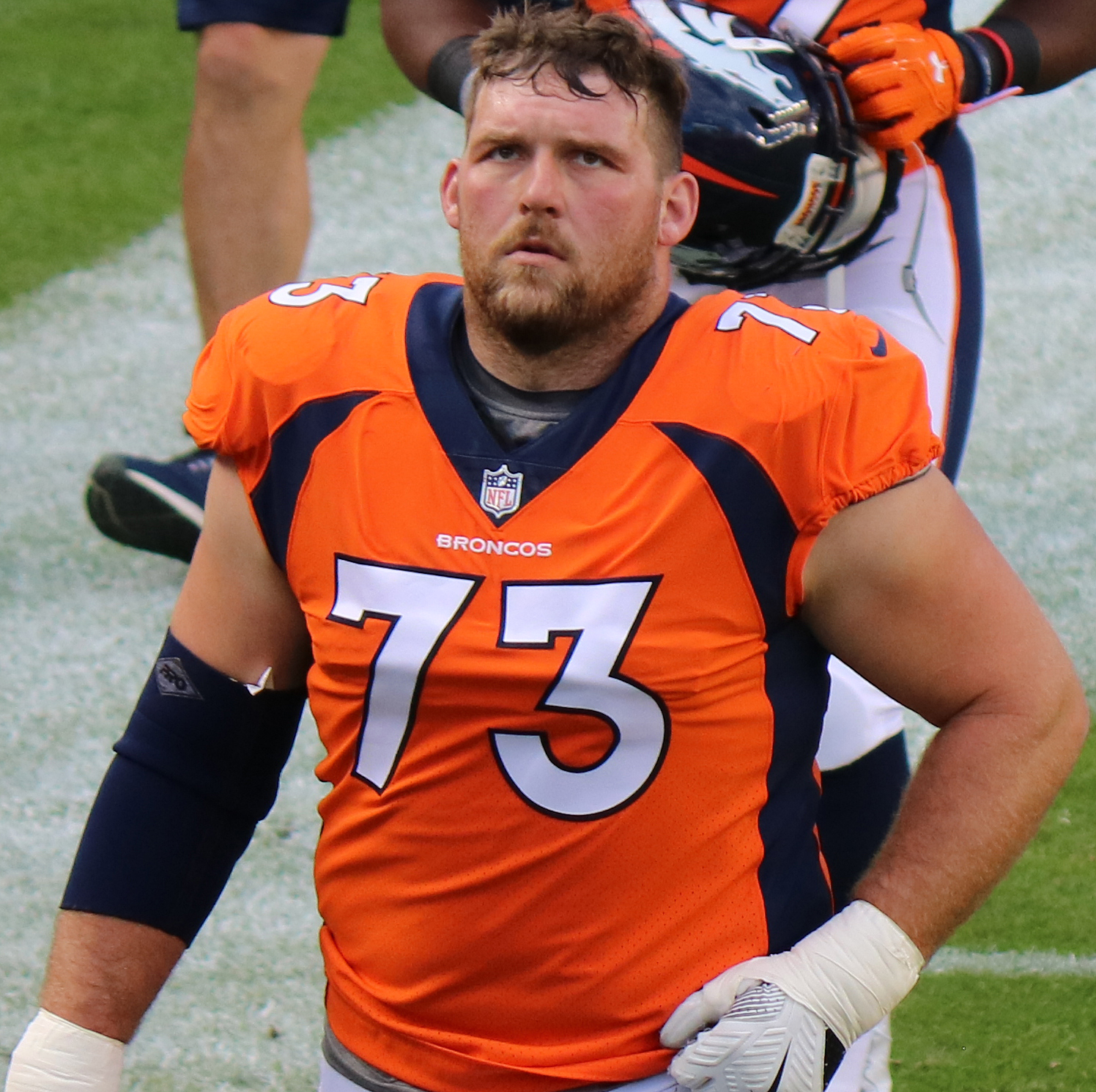
  Allen Barbre with the Denver Broncos
- Henry Taylor Blow - U.S. Representative from Missouri, Ambassador to Venezuela and Brazil, President of The Granby Mining and Smelting Company
- Jill Carter (politician) - Missouri Senator 32nd District

== Geography ==
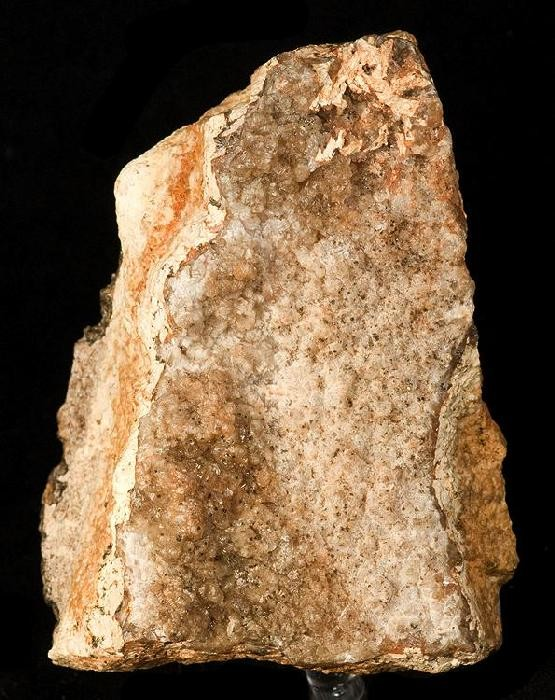
Specimen of calamine from mine at Granby, Missouri

Granby is located at 36°55′04″N 94°15′39″W.

According to the United States Census Bureau, the city has a total area of 4.43 square miles (11.47 km^{2}), of which 4.42 square miles (11.45 km^{2}) is land and 0.01 square miles (0.03 km^{2}) is water.

There are virtually no chat piles left in Granby today as evidence of the boom of lead and zinc mining as part of the Tri-State district back in the early 20th century.
