= Gary Nodler =

American politician

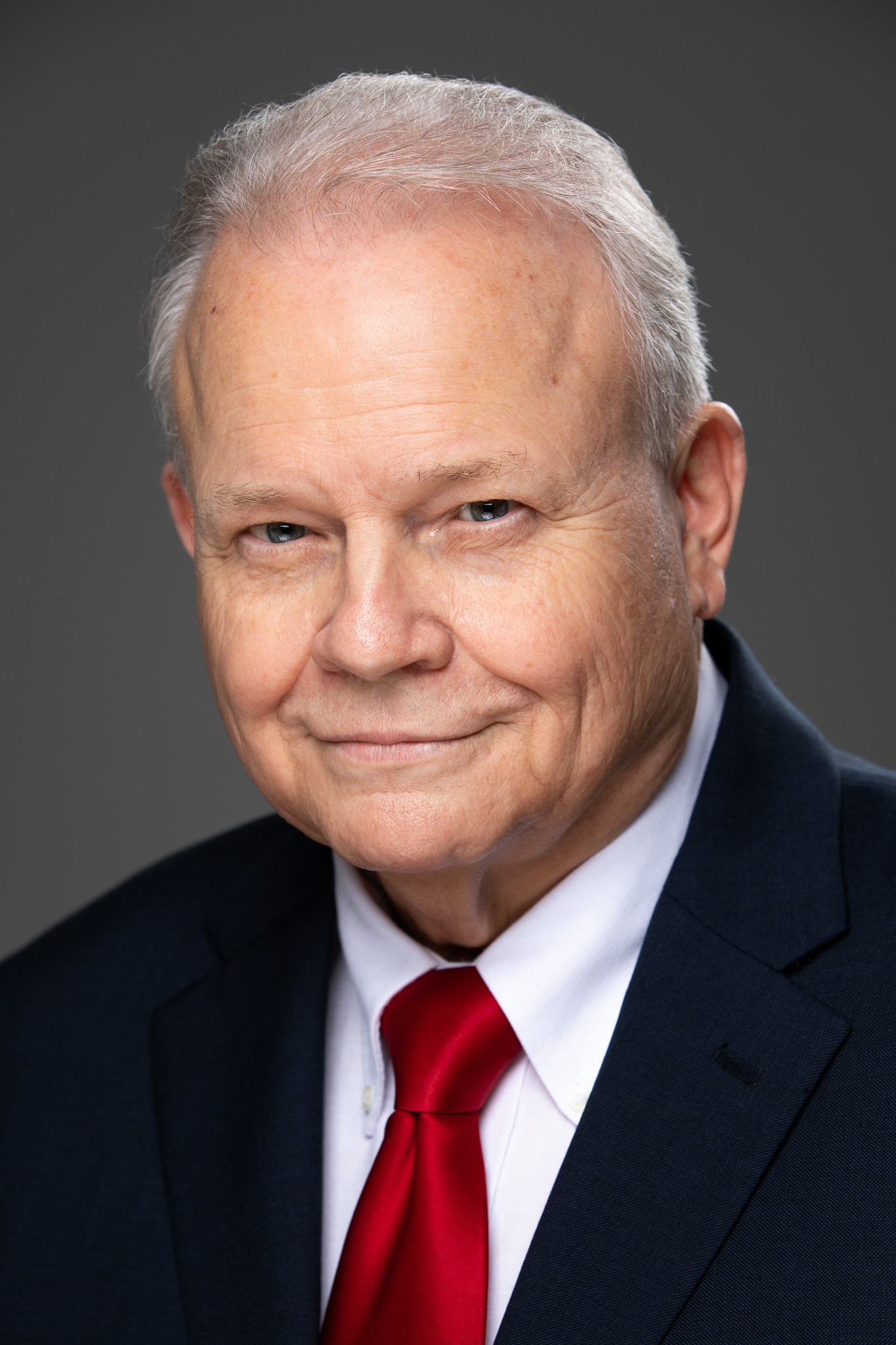

Member of the Missouri Senate from the 32nd district
- In office 2003–2011
- Preceded by: Marvin Singleton
- Succeeded by: Ron Richard

Personal details
- Born: August 10, 1950 (age 75)
- Party: Republican
- Spouse: Joncee Edwards Nodler
- Profession: Public service

Gary Nodler (born August 10, 1950) is an American politician who served as a Republican in the Missouri State Senate, where he chaired the Senate Appropriations Committee. He is a resident of Joplin, Missouri, married to the former Joncee Edwards with one son, Justin and one granddaughter Rachel.

== Biography ==
He was born in Champaign, Illinois raised in Neosho, Missouri, and attended Crowder College and Missouri Southern State University, where he received his B.A. degree in political science in 1972. In 1985, he was selected as one of the Outstanding Young Men in America. In 2007 he was awarded an Honorary Doctor of Education degree from Missouri Western State University. He has served in the United States Army and in the Missouri National Guard. He is a member of the First Christian Church of Webb City and the American Legion. He served as Congressman Gene Taylor's district staff director from 1973 to 1988. While there he completed the Library of Congress's Congressional Staff Institute. Nodler built and operated the cable television system in Seneca, Missouri. He served on the Board of Directors of First State Bank in Monett, Missouri. He also served for three years as the Executive Director of the Monett Chamber of Commerce. He became a regional administrator of the Small Business Administration in 1989, serving through 1992. He completed the OPM Federal Executive Training Program and was admitted to the Senior Executive Service of the United States. He was also a member of the Rural Economic Policy Working Group of the White House Economic Policy Council from 1991 to 1992. He served as staff for the Missouri Congressional delegation from 1997 through 2000. He served on Governor Bob Holden's Commission on the Future of Higher Education. He was first elected to the Missouri State Senate in 2002. Nodler wrote Senate Bill 55 elevating Missouri Southern State College to university status and renaming it Missouri Southern State University. He also authored Senate Bill 389 which included the Lewis & Clark Discovery Initiative, providing capital improvements to Missouri higher education institutions, including $20 million to Missouri Southern State University for the school's new Health Sciences Building. He represented the Missouri Senate as a Member of the Missouri Investment Trust Board advising the State Treasurer. He also served as the Senate member of the Missouri Second Capitol Commission. He served as Assistant Majority Floor Leader and on the following committees: Appropriations-Chairman, Education-Chairman, Pensions/ Veterans' Affairs and General Laws, Joint Committee on Capital Improvements and Leases Oversight, Joint Committee on Education, Joint Committee on Government Accountability, Joint Committee on Legislative Research and Oversight-Chairman, Joint Committee on the Life Sciences.

After leaving the Senate, Nodler served 3 years on the Board of the Joplin Sports Authority and also served as a member of the Joplin School Board. In August 2018 he was appointed by Governor Mike Parson to the Missouri Coordinating Board for Higher Education, In December 2022 he was elected chairman of the board. In late 2022 Nodler became an author publishing "Experiencing Life and the Universe". The book surprisingly is not about politics but metaphysics.

== Awards ==
Awards Presented to Senator Nodler:

- Missouri Laborers' "Legislator of the Year" Award, 2003
- Missouri Southern State University Outstanding Alumnus, 2003
- Missouri Association for Career and Technical Education Legislative Recognition Award, 2005
- Missouri Community College Association Distinguished Legislator Award, 2005
- Missouri Chamber of Commerce and Industry "100% For Jobs" Award, 2005
- American Institute of Architects Appreciation Award, 2006 and 2008
- The Missouri Bar's Legislative Award, 2007
- Missouri Court Appointed Special Advocates Association Legislative Award, 2007
- Missouri Society of Professional Engineers Legislator of Year Award, 2007
- Missouri Chamber of Commerce & Industry Spirit of Enterprise Award, 2007
- LIFT Missouri, Legislators For Literacy Award, 2008
- Gateway Chapter of the Autism Society of America Certificate of Recognition, 2008
- St. Louis Business Journal Legislative Award, 2008
- Missouri Healthcare Association Senior Advocate of the Year, 2009
- St. Louis Regional Chamber and Growth Association Lewis & Clark Statesman Award, 2009
- Judicial Conference of Missouri, Recognition for the Advancement of the Administration of Justice in Missouri, 2009
- Freeman Health Care, Freeman Fellow
- Missouri Association of Veterans Organizations Legislator of the Year, 2010
- Richard M. Webster Medallion for public Service, 2018
