= Bill White (Missouri politician) =

American politician

Member of the Missouri Senate from the 32nd district
- In office January 3, 2019 – January 3, 2023
- Succeeded by: Jill Carter

Member of the Missouri House of Representatives from the 161st district
- In office January 5, 2011 – January 3, 2019
- Preceded by: Ron Richard
- Succeeded by: Lane Roberts

Personal details
- Born: June 16, 1953 (age 73) Kansas City, Missouri, U.S.
- Party: Republican

Bill White (born June 16, 1953) is an American politician. He served a member of the Missouri House of Representatives from 2011 to 2019, and a member of the Missouri Senate from 2019 to 2023. He is a member of the Republican Party. White ran for reelection in 2022 for a second term in the Senate, but lost the Republican primary to challenger Jill Carter.

== Electoral history ==
=== State representative ===
Missouri House of Representatives Primary Election, August 3, 2010, district 129
Party	Candidate	Votes	%	±%
Republican	William (Bill) White	3,163	71.11%	
Republican	Shelly Dreyer	1,285	28.89%	

Missouri House of Representatives Election, November 2, 2010, District 129
Party	Candidate	Votes	%	±%
Republican	William (Bill) White	6,341	70.69%	−29.31
Democratic	Jim West	2,629	29.31%	+29.31

Missouri House of Representatives Election, November 6, 2012, District 161
Party	Candidate	Votes	%	±%
Republican	William (Bill) White	11,115	100.00%	+29.31

Missouri House of Representatives Election, November 4, 2014, District 161
Party	Candidate	Votes	%	±%
Republican	William (Bill) White	4,593	73.84%	−26.16
Democratic	Charles (Hugh) Shields	1,627	26.16%	+26.16

Missouri House of Representatives Election, November 8, 2016, District 161
Party	Candidate	Votes	%	±%
Republican	William (Bill) White	12,292	100.00%	+26.16

=== State Senate ===
Missouri Senate Primary Election, August 7, 2018, District 32
Party	Candidate	Votes	%	±%
Republican	William (Bill) White	17,478	64.16%	
Republican	Rob O'Brian	9,765	35.84%	

Missouri Senate Election, November 6, 2018, District 32
Party	Candidate	Votes	%	±%
Republican	William (Bill) White	48,412	73.72%	−26.28
Democratic	Carolyn McGowan	15,140	23.06%	+23.06
Green	Colon Gillis	2,117	3.22%	+3.22

Missouri Senate Primary Election, August 2, 2022, District 32
Party	Candidate	Votes	%	±%
Republican	Jill Carter	13,440	52.24%	
Republican	William (Bill) White	12,286	47.76%	
Total votes		25,726	100.00%	
