= Ron Richard =

American politician (1947–2023)

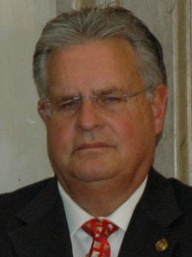
- Richard in 2010

President pro tempore of the Missouri Senate
- In office September 15, 2015 – January 9, 2019
- Preceded by: Tom Dempsey
- Succeeded by: Dave Schatz

Member of the Missouri Senate from the 32nd district
- In office January 5, 2011 – January 9, 2019
- Preceded by: Gary Nodler
- Succeeded by: Bill White

71st Speaker of the Missouri House of Representatives
- In office January 7, 2009 – January 5, 2011
- Preceded by: Rod Jetton
- Succeeded by: Steven Tilley

Member of the Missouri House of Representatives from the 129th district
- In office January 8, 2003 – January 5, 2011
- Preceded by: Chuck Surface
- Succeeded by: Bill White

Personal details
- Born: Ronald Francis Richard; July 4, 1947 Parsons, Kansas, U.S.
- Died: June 9, 2023 (aged 75)
- Party: Republican
- Spouse: Patty Richard
- Children: 2
- Education: Missouri Southern State University (BA); Southwest Missouri State College (MA)
- Website: Official website

Ronald Francis Richard (July 4, 1947 – June 9, 2023) was an American politician from the state of Missouri. A Republican, Richard served in the Missouri House of Representatives, including as Speaker of the House before being elected to the State Senate in 2010. He was the first speaker to later be elected Missouri senator in more than 100 years and became the first in Missouri's history to serve as top leader in both houses of his state's legislature, and the fifth person in United States history to do such after winning election for President Pro Tem of the Missouri Senate. Richard represented the 32nd Senatorial District.

== Background ==
=== Personal life ===
Richard was born in Parsons, Kansas. After moving to Joplin during his childhood, Richard graduated from McAuley Catholic High School in 1965. Richard attended Missouri Southern State University, receiving a Bachelor of Arts in 1969. He then furthered his education by attending graduate school at Southwest Missouri State College, receiving his Master of Arts in 1971.

Richard lived in Joplin, Missouri with his wife, Patty. They had two children together: Kara and Chad.

Richard died from complications of bladder cancer on June 9, 2023, at the age of 75.

=== Career ===
Richard was a partner in A&R Development and C&R Development Corporation. Additionally, Richard had full duties with C&N Bowl Corporation, a company owning bowling alleys.

==== Group memberships and awards ====
Richard was a member of the Joplin Elks Lodge, the Joplin Chamber of Commerce, the National Federation of Independent Businesses, the Joplin Industrial and Development Authority, the Joplin Kiwanis Club, Missouri Farm Bureau, Scottish Rite Bodies, the Valley of Joplin, the Joplin Knights of Columbus, and the Missouri Higher Education Savings Program Board (MOST). He was a member of the Professional Bowlers Association and was the chairman of the Joplin 353 Downtown Development Corporation.

Richard was the recipient of the Missouri Southern State University Outstanding Alumni award in 2003, the RCGA Statesman Award in 2004, the St. Louis Business Journal Legislative Award, the Community College Award, and has served as the 7th District delegate to the Republican National Convention on multiple occasions.

== Political career ==
Richard's first role in politics came in 1990, when he was elected to the Joplin City Council. He served on the city council until 1994, when he was elected mayor. Richard served as Joplin mayor until 1997.

In 2002, Richard ran to replace the outgoing Chuck Surface, in the first session where term limits were enacted in 1992 and starting in 1994 fully affected all prior members. Richard won a primary battle with fellow Republican Edward Duff, garnering over 75% of the vote. He then won the general election in a three-way race with Democrat Fred Coombes and Libertarian Jack Stults, earning nearly 69% of the vote. He has run unopposed in every election since.

In 2005, Richard was appointed chairman of the influential Committee on Job Creation and Economic Development. Richard helped lead several key pieces of legislation through the Missouri House, including a bill that would have helped Canadian aerospace manufacturer Bombardier construct a mega-plant in the Kansas City metropolitan area. Despite successful passage through the General Assembly and approval by Governor Matt Blunt, Bombardier decided not to relocate.

In September 2007, the House Republican caucus chose to meet and choose a successor to then-Speaker Rod Jetton for the 95th General Assembly. This election was held "to fend off any fight during what could be a difficult election cycle," and to allow the prospective incoming speaker to attend leadership meetings in preparation for their new role. In a caucus meeting, Richard beat out fellow Republican and Budget Committee chair Allen Icet to be preliminarily named Speaker of the 95th General Assembly. Upon convening the 95th General Assembly, Richard was named speaker by acclamation.

In 2010 he ran unopposed in both the primary and general election to assume the 32nd district state senate position formerly held by Gary Nodler, becoming the first House speaker to serve in the Senate in 100 years. He was chosen to serve as majority floor leader in 2012. Senator Richard was elected to a second Senate term in 2014 and again was selected as majority floor leader. In 2015 his colleagues elected him to serve as President Pro Tem of the Senate. He is the only person in Missouri history to serve as both Speaker of the House and President Pro Tem of the Senate.

== Electoral history ==
2002 General Election for Missouri’s 129th District House of Representatives
Party	Candidate	Votes	%	±%
Republican	Ron Richard	6,137	68.6	
Democratic	Fred E. Coombes	2,385	26.7	
Libertarian	Jack L. Stults	422	4.7	

2002 Primary Election for Missouri’s 129th District House of Representatives
Party	Candidate	Votes	%	±%
Republican	Ron Richard	2,715	75.4	
Republican	Edward Duff	886	24.6	

== See also ==
- List of mayors of Joplin, Missouri

Missouri House of Representatives
Preceded by Chuck Surface	Member of the Missouri House of Representatives from the 129th district 2003–2011	Succeeded by Bill White
Political offices
Preceded by Rod Jetton	Speaker of the Missouri House of Representatives; 2009–2011	Succeeded by Steven Tilley
Missouri Senate
Preceded by Gary Nodler	Member of the Missouri Senate from the 32nd district 2011–2019	Succeeded by Bill White
Preceded by Tom Dempsey	President pro tempore of the Missouri Senate; 2015–2019	Succeeded by Dave Schatz
