= Marvin Singleton =

American politician

Marvin A Singleton

Member of the Missouri Senate from the 32nd district
- In office 1990 – January 8, 2003
- Preceded by: Richard M. Webster
- Succeeded by: Gary Nodler

Personal details
- Born: October 7, 1939 (age 86) Baytown, Texas
- Party: Republican

Marvin A Singleton (born October 7, 1939) is an American politician who served in the Missouri Senate from the 32nd district from 1990 to 2003.
