= 2024 United States House of Representatives elections in Missouri =

- November 5, 2024

All 8 Missouri seats to the United States House of Representatives
	Majority party	Minority party
Party	Republican	Democratic
Last election	6	2
Seats won	6	2
Seat change	Steady	Steady
Popular vote	1,711,050	1,125,671
Percentage	58.50%	38.49%
Swing	▼0.90%	▼0.10%

Republican
50–60%
60–70%
70–80%
80–90%
Democratic
50–60%
60–70%
70–80%

The 2024 United States House of Representatives elections in Missouri were held on November 5, 2024, to elect the eight U.S. representatives from the state of Missouri, one from each of the state's congressional districts. The elections coincided with the U.S. presidential election, as well as other elections to the House of Representatives, elections to the United States Senate, and various state and local elections. Primary elections took place on August 6, 2024.

== Overview ==
=== Statewide ===
Party	Candi- dates	Votes		Seats		
Party	Candi- dates	No.	%	No.	+/–	%
Republican Party	8	1,711,050	58.50%	6	Steady	75%
Democratic Party	8	1,125,671	38.49%	2	Steady	25%
Libertarian Party	8	65,284	2.23%	0	Steady	0%
Green Party	5	20,577	0.70%	0	Steady	0%
Better Party	1	2,279	0.08%	0	Steady	0%
Write-ins	–	2	0.00%	0	Steady	0%
Total	30	2,924,863	100%	8	Steady	100%

Popular vote
Republican	58.50%
Democratic	38.49%
Other	3.01%

House seats
Republican	75.00%
Democratic	25.00%

=== District ===
District	Republican		Democratic		Others		Total		Result
District	Votes	%	Votes	%	Votes	%	Votes	%	Result
District 1	56,453	18.37%	233,312	75.93%	17,500	5.70%	307,265	100.0%	Democratic hold
District 2	233,444	54.49%	182,056	42.50%	12,892	3.01%	428,392	100.0%	Republican hold
District 3	240,620	61.31%	138,532	35.30%	13,311	3.39%	392,463	100.0%	Republican hold
District 4	259,886	71.07%	96,568	26.41%	9,242	2.53%	365,696	100.0%	Republican hold
District 5	120,957	36.44%	199,900	60.22%	11,072	3.34%	331,929	100.0%	Democratic hold
District 6	265,210	70.69%	100,999	26.92%	8,977	2.39%	375,186	100.0%	Republican hold
District 7	263,231	71.56%	96,655	26.27%	7,982	2.17%	367,868	100.0%	Republican hold
District 8	271,249	76.18%	77,649	21.81%	7,166	2.01%	356,064	100.0%	Republican hold
Total	1,711,050	58.50%	1,125,671	38.49%	88,142	3.01%	2,924,863	100.0%	

== District 1 ==
2024 Missouri's 1st congressional district election
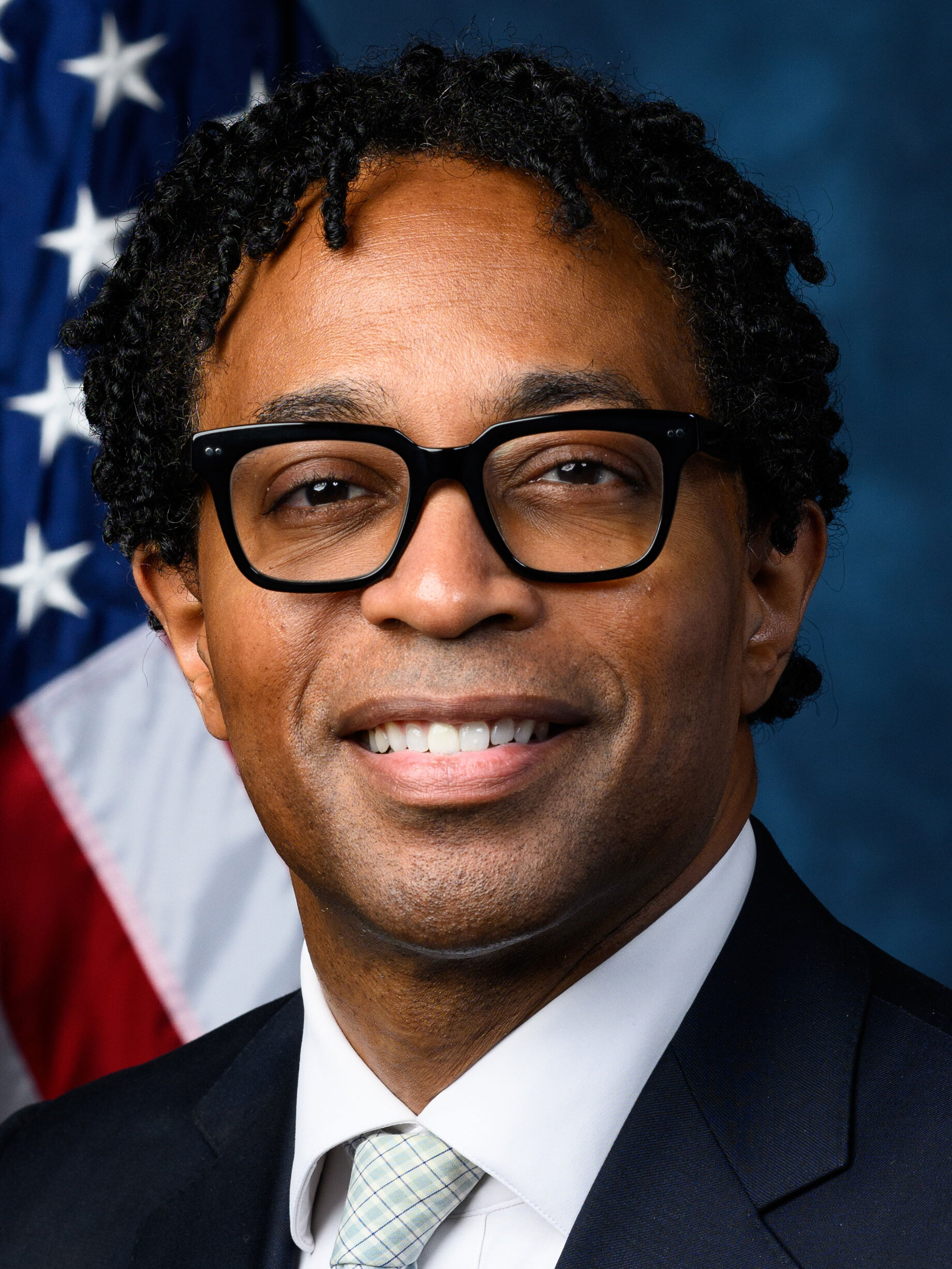

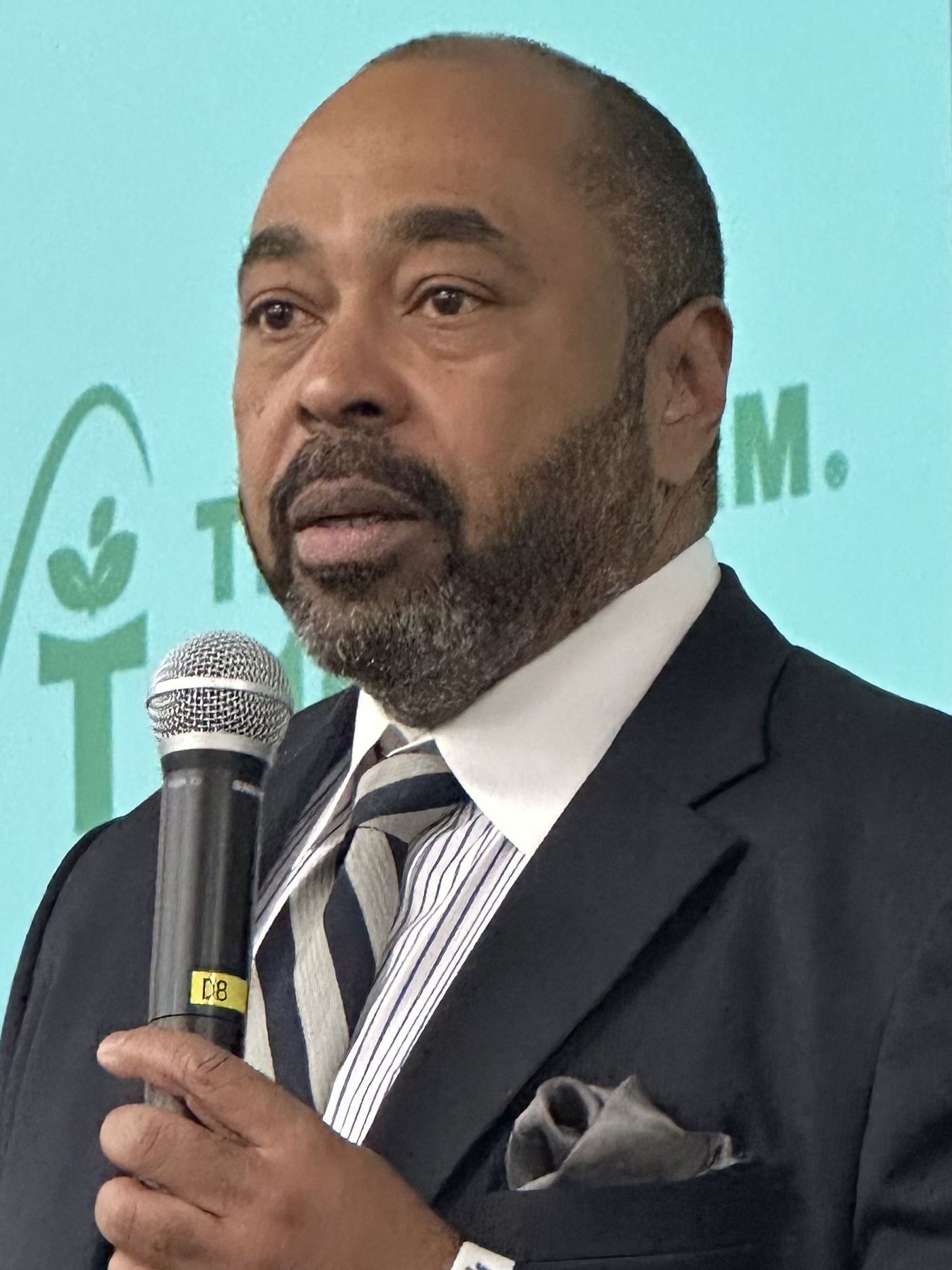
Nominee	Wesley Bell	Andrew Jones
Party	Democratic	Republican
Popular vote	233,312	56,453
Percentage	75.9%	18.4%
- Bell: 40–50% 50–60% 60–70% 70–80% 80–90% >90% Jones: 40–50% 60–70% 80–90% >90% Tie: 50% No votes
U.S. Representative before election
Cori Bush
Democratic
Elected U.S. Representative
Wesley Bell
Democratic

The 1st district encompasses the city of St. Louis and much of northern St. Louis County, including Florissant and University City. The incumbent was Democrat Cori Bush, who was elected with 72.9% of the vote in 2022. Bush was considered vulnerable in this race and lost her primary to Wesley Bell.

=== Democratic primary ===
The primary, held on August 6, 2024, was the second most-expensive House primary in history, with a record $9 million in spending against Bush from United Democracy Project, AIPAC's super PAC. The organization targeted Bush after her criticism of Israel during the Gaza war.

==== Nominee ====
- Wesley Bell, St. Louis County prosecuting attorney

==== Eliminated in primary ====
- Cori Bush, incumbent U.S. representative
- Maria Chappelle-Nadal, former state senator and state representative, and candidate for this district in 2016
- Ron Harshaw, high school football coach and candidate for this district in 2022

==== Declined ====
- Brian Williams, state senator

==== Endorsements ====
Wesley Bell

State legislators

- Jill Schupp, former state senator from the 24th district (2015–2023)

County officials

- Charlie Dooley, former St. Louis County Executive (2003–2015)

Local officials

- Ella Jones, mayor of Ferguson (2020–present)
- 7 other mayors
- 5 St. Louis County police chiefs

Organizations

- AIPAC
- Democratic Majority for Israel
- Indivisible St. Louis
- Jewish Democratic Council of America
- Pro-Israel America

Labor unions

- Insulators Union Local 1
- Missouri-Kansas Laborers’ District Council
- Sheet Metal Workers Local 36
- United Association Local 562
- United Food and Commercial Workers Local 655

Newspapers

- St Louis Post-Dispatch
Cori Bush

U.S. senators

- Bernie Sanders, U.S. Senator from Vermont (2007–present)

U.S. representatives

- Pete Aguilar, chair of the House Democratic Caucus from CA-33 (2015–present)
- Jamaal Bowman, NY-16 (2021–present)
- Katherine Clark, House Minority Whip from MA-05 (2021–present)
- Hakeem Jeffries, House Minority Leader from NY-08 (2013-present)
- Summer Lee, PA-12 (2023–present)
- Alexandria Ocasio-Cortez, NY-14 (2019–present)
- Ilhan Omar, MN-05 (2019–present)
- Ayanna Pressley, MA-07 (2019–present)
- Delia Ramirez, IL-03 (2023–present)
- Rashida Tlaib, MI-12 (2019–present)

Local officials

- Rasheen Aldridge, St. Louis alder (2023–present)
- Megan Green, president of the St. Louis Board of Aldermen
- Tishaura Jones, mayor of St. Louis (2021–present)
- Sharon Pace, mayor of Northwoods (2021–present)
- 4 other St. Louis alders

Individuals

- Damon Davis, multi-media artist
- Percy Green II, social worker
- Tef Poe, musician
- LJ Punch, critical care surgeon
- Blake Strode, civil rights lawyer

Organizations

- Congressional Black Caucus PAC
- Democratic Socialists of America
- Friends of the Earth Action
- Jewish Voice for Peace Action fund
- Justice Democrats
- League of Conservation Voters
- National Women's Political Caucus
- Peace Action
- Planned Parenthood Action Fund
- Sierra Club
- Sunrise Movement
- Working Families Party

Labor unions

- American Federation of Government Employees Local 96
- Coalition of Black Trade Unionists
- Communications Workers of America
- National Nurses United
- Service Employees International Union Missouri/Kansas council

Newspapers

- The St. Louis American
Declined to endorse

Local officials

- Sam Page, St. Louis county executive (2019–present)

==== Fundraising ====
Campaign finance reports as of July 17, 2024
Candidate	Raised	Spent	Cash on hand
Wesley Bell (D)	$4,775,400	$2,995,107	$1,780,293
Cori Bush (D)	$2,915,881	$2,572,286	$354,442
Maria Chappelle-Nadal (D)	$18,695	$13,711	$4,983
Source: Federal Election Commission

==== Polling ====
Poll source	Date(s) administered	Sample size (Note: Key: A – all adults RV – registered voters LV – likely voters V – unclear)	Margin of error	Wesley Bell	Cori Bush	Other	Undecided
Mellman Group (Note: Poll conducted by Democratic Majority for Israel PAC, which supports Bell)	July 21–24, 2024	400 (LV)	–	48%	42%	0% (Note: Maria Chappelle-Nadal and Ron Harshaw with 0%)	8%
McLaughlin & Associates (D) (Note: Poll sponsored by the CCA Action Fund, which supports Bell)	June 28 – July 1, 2024	300 (LV)	± 5.7%	56%	33%	–	11%
Mellman Group	June 18–22, 2024	400 (LV)	± 4.9%	43%	42%	4% (Note: "Other candidates on the ballot" with 4%)	11%
Remington Research (R) (Note: Poll conducted for the tip sheet Missouri Scout)	February 7–9, 2024	401 (LV)	± 4.95%	50%	28%	4% (Note: Maria Chappelle-Nadal with 4%)	18%

==== Results ====

Bell

50–60%

Bush

50–60%

Bell

40–50%
50–60%
60–70%
70–80%
80–90%
90–100%

Bush

40–50%
50–60%
60–70%
70–80%
80–90%
90–100%

Other

40–50% tie
50% tie
No votes

Democratic primary results
Party	Candidate	Votes	%
Democratic	Wesley Bell	63,521	51.12%
Democratic	Cori Bush (incumbent)	56,723	45.65%
Democratic	Maria Chappelle-Nadal	3,279	2.64%
Democratic	Ron Harshaw	735	0.59%
Total votes		124,258	100.00%

=== Republican primary ===
==== Nominee ====
- Andrew Jones, energy executive, perennial candidate, and nominee for this district in 2022

==== Eliminated in primary ====
- Timothy Gartin, teacher
- Stan Hall, pastor
- Mike Hebron, St. Louis Ward 6 Republican Committee member and perennial candidate
- Laura Mitchell-Riley, candidate for this district in 2022

==== Fundraising ====
Campaign finance reports as of March 31, 2024
Candidate	Raised	Spent	Cash on hand
Andrew Jones (R)	$14,930	$832	$14,098
Source: Federal Election Commission

==== Results ====
Republican primary results
Party	Candidate	Votes	%
Republican	Andrew Jones	4,209	26.9%
Republican	Stan Hall	4,008	25.6%
Republican	Mike Hebron	3,247	20.7%
Republican	Laura Mitchell-Riley	3,215	20.5%
Republican	Timothy Gartin	996	6.4%
Total votes		15,675	100.0%

=== Third-party and independent candidates ===
==== Declared ====
- Blake Ashby (Better Party), former Ferguson city councilor and perennial candidate
- Don Fitz (Green), research psychologist, nominee for governor in 2016, and nominee for state auditor in 2018
- Rochelle Riggins (Libertarian)

=== General election ===
==== Predictions ====
Source	Ranking	As of
Cook Political Report	Solid D	February 2, 2023
Inside Elections	Solid D	March 10, 2023
Sabato's Crystal Ball	Safe D	February 23, 2023
Elections Daily	Safe D	October 26, 2023
CNalysis	Solid D	November 16, 2023
Decision Desk HQ	Solid D	June 1, 2024

==== Results ====
2024 Missouri's 1st congressional district election
Party	Candidate	Votes	%
Democratic	Wesley Bell	233,312	75.9%
Republican	Andrew Jones	56,453	18.4%
Libertarian	Rochelle Riggins	10,070	3.3%
Green	Don Fitz	5,151	1.7%
Better Party	Blake Ashby	2,279	0.7%
Total votes		307,265	100.0%
Democratic hold			

== District 2 ==
2024 Missouri's 2nd congressional district election
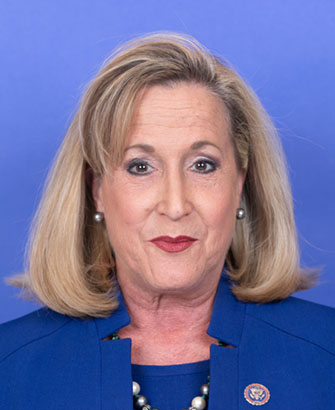

Nominee	Ann Wagner	Ray Hartmann
Party	Republican	Democratic
Popular vote	233,444	182,056
Percentage	54.5%	42.5%
- Wagner: 40–50% 50–60% 60–70% 70–80% 80–90% >90% Hartmann: 40–50% 50–60% 60–70% 70–80% 80–90% >90% Tie: 40–50% 50% No votes
U.S. Representative before election
Ann Wagner
Republican
Elected U.S. Representative
Ann Wagner
Republican

The 2nd district is based in eastern Missouri, and includes the southern and western suburbs of St. Louis, including Arnold, Town and Country, Wildwood, Chesterfield, and Oakville. The incumbent was Republican Ann Wagner, who was re-elected with 54.9% of the vote in 2022.

=== Republican primary ===
==== Nominee ====
- Ann Wagner, incumbent U.S. representative

==== Eliminated in primary ====
- Peter Pfeifer, college professor and candidate for U.S. Senate in 2018

==== Endorsements ====
Ann Wagner

Organizations

- AIPAC
- Pro-Israel America

==== Fundraising ====
Campaign finance reports as of March 31, 2024
Candidate	Raised	Spent	Cash on hand
Ann Wagner (R)	$2,555,170	$1,215,522	$2,797,128
Source: Federal Election Commission

==== Results ====
Republican primary results
Party	Candidate	Votes	%
Republican	Ann Wagner (incumbent)	56,865	64.8%
Republican	Peter Pfeifer	30,847	35.2%
Total votes		87,712	100.0%

=== Democratic primary ===
==== Nominee ====
- Ray Hartmann, founder of the Riverfront Times

==== Eliminated in primary ====
- Chuck Summers

==== Withdrawn ====
- John Kiehne, digital media consultant and perennial candidate

==== Fundraising ====
Campaign finance reports as of March 31, 2024
Candidate	Raised	Spent	Cash on hand
Ray Hartmann (D)	$23,253	$3,316	$19,937
Source: Federal Election Commission

==== Results ====
Democratic primary results
Party	Candidate	Votes	%
Democratic	Ray Hartmann	42,605	77.7%
Democratic	Chuck Summers	12,200	22.3%
Total votes		54,805	100.0%

=== Third-party and independent candidates ===
==== Declared ====
- Brandon Daugherty (Libertarian), hospitality manager
- Shelby Davis (Green), research director

=== General election ===
==== Predictions ====
Source	Ranking	As of
Cook Political Report	Solid R	February 2, 2023
Inside Elections	Solid R	March 10, 2023
Sabato's Crystal Ball	Safe R	February 23, 2023
Elections Daily	Likely R	October 26, 2023
CNalysis	Very Likely R	November 16, 2023
Decision Desk HQ	Safe R	October 11, 2024

==== Results ====
2024 Missouri's 2nd congressional district election
Party	Candidate	Votes	%
Republican	Ann Wagner (incumbent)	233,444	54.49%
Democratic	Ray Hartmann	182,056	42.50%
Libertarian	Brandon Daugherty	8,951	2.09%
Green	Shelby Davis	3,941	0.92%
Total votes		428,392	100.00%
Republican hold			

== District 3 ==
2024 Missouri's 3rd congressional district election
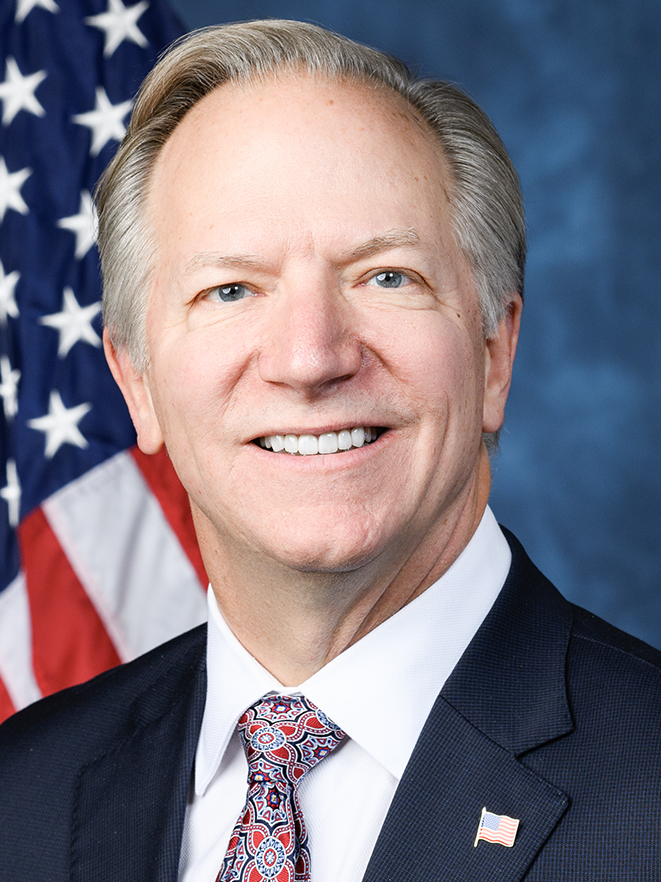

Nominee	Bob Onder	Bethany Mann
Party	Republican	Democratic
Popular vote	240,620	138,532
Percentage	61.3%	35.3%
- Onder: 40–50% 50–60% 60–70% 70–80% 80–90% >90% Mann: 40–50% 50–60% 60–70% 70–80%
U.S. Representative before election
Blaine Luetkemeyer
Republican
Elected U.S. Representative
Bob Onder
Republican

The third district encompasses east-central Missouri, taking in Jefferson City, Troy, O'Fallon, and Washington. The incumbent was Republican Blaine Luetkemeyer, who was re-elected with 65.1% of the vote in 2022. Luetkemeyer initially ran for re-election, but in January 2024, he suspended his campaign and announced that he would retire.

=== Republican primary ===
==== Nominee ====
- Bob Onder, former state senator from the 2nd district (2015–2023) and candidate for this district (Note: This district was numbered as the 9th district prior to the 2010 redistricting cycle) in 2008

==== Eliminated in primary ====
- Chad Bicknell, salesman
- Kyle Bone, aerospace engineer
- Bruce Bowman, consultant
- Arnie Dienoff, property manager and perennial candidate
- Kurt Schaefer, former state senator from the 19th district (2009–2017)

==== Withdrawn ====
- Taylor Burks, former Boone County Clerk and candidate for the 4th district in 2022
- Mary Elizabeth Coleman, state senator from the 22nd district (2023–present) (ran for Secretary of State)
- Justin Hicks, state representative from the 108th district (remained on ballot)
- Blaine Luetkemeyer, incumbent U.S. representative (endorsed Schaefer)
- Brandon Wilkinson, truck driver and candidate for this district in 2020 and 2022 (endorsed Onder)

==== Declined ====
- Andrew Bailey, Missouri Attorney General (ran for re-election)
- Mike Bernskoetter, state senator from the 6th district (2019–present)
- Bill Eigel, state senator from the 23rd district (2017–present) (ran for governor)
- Travis Fitzwater, state senator from the 10th district (2023–present)
- Caleb Jones, former state representative from the 50th district (2011–2017)
- Mike Kehoe, lieutenant governor of Missouri (2018–present) (ran for governor)
- Tony Luetkemeyer, state senator from the 34th district (2019–present) and cousin of incumbent Blaine Luetkemeyer
- Caleb Rowden, president pro tempore of the Missouri Senate (2023–present) from the 19th district (2017–present) (ran for secretary of state)
- Nick Schroer, state senator from the 2nd district (2023–present)
- Adam Schwadron, state representative from the 105th district (2021–present) (ran for secretary of state)
- Sara Walsh, former state representative from the 50th district (2017–2023) and candidate for the 4th district in 2022

==== Endorsements ====
Bob Onder

U.S. presidents

- Donald Trump, former president of the United States (2017–2021)

U.S. senators

- Ted Cruz, U.S. senator from Texas (2013–present)

U.S. representatives

- Jim Banks, U.S. representative from IN-03
- Eric Burlison, U.S. representative from MO-07
- Byron Donalds, U.S. representative from FL-19
- Chip Roy, U.S. representative from TX-21

State legislators

- Nick Schroer, state senator from the 2nd district

Individuals

- Brandon Wilkinson, truck driver and former candidate for this district

Organizations

- Club for Growth
- House Freedom Fund
- Republicans for National Renewal
Kurt Schaefer

U.S. representatives

- Blaine Luetkemeyer, U.S. representative for this district

Organizations

- Missouri Farm Bureau PAC

==== Polling ====
Poll source	Date(s) administered	Sample size	Margin of error	Justin Hicks	Bob Onder	Kurt Schaefer	Other	Undecided
Remington Research (R) (Note: Poll sponsored by Onder's campaign)	July 14–15, 2024	401 (LV)	± 4.9%	3%	34%	14%	13% (Note: Arnie Dienoff with 6%; Kyle Bone with 4%; Chad Bicknell with 2%; Bruce Bowman with 1%)	35%
Remington Research (R)	February 28 - March 1, 2024	411 (LV)	± 4.9%	4%	19%	5%	10% (Note: Mary Elizabeth Coleman with 9%; Brandon Wilkinson with 1%)	62%

==== Fundraising ====
Campaign finance reports as of July 17, 2024
Candidate	Raised	Spent	Cash on hand
Justin Hicks (R) (Note: Withdrawn candidate)	$151,461 (Note: $27,900 of this total was self-funded by Hicks.)	$96,787	$54,673
Bob Onder (R)	$1,155,303 (Note: $500,000 of this total was self-funded by Onder.)	$733,631	$421,671
Kurt Schaefer (R)	$272,780	$82,573	$190,206
Mary Elizabeth Coleman (R)	$125,054	$30,911	$94,142
Blaine Luetkemeyer (R)	$1,009,923	$1,299,556	$1,481,480
Source: Federal Election Commission

==== Results ====
Republican primary results by county: Onder: 40–50% 50–60%; 60–70%; Schaefer: 40–50%; 50–60%

Republican primary results
Party	Candidate	Votes	%
Republican	Bob Onder	48,833	47.37%
Republican	Kurt Schaefer	38,375	37.22%
Republican	Bruce Bowman	4,508	4.37%
Republican	Justin Hicks (withdrawn)	4,425	4.29%
Republican	Kyle Bone	3,548	3.44%
Republican	Chad Bicknell	1,842	1.79%
Republican	Arnie Dienoff	1,560	1.51%
Total votes		103,091	100.00%

=== Democratic primary ===
==== Nominee ====
- Bethany Mann, environmental chemist and nominee for this district in 2022

==== Eliminated in primary ====
- Andrew Daly, Missouri School for the Deaf activities director and candidate for this district in 2022

==== Fundraising ====
Campaign finance reports as of July 17, 2024
Candidate	Raised	Spent	Cash on hand
Jon Karlen (D) (Note: Has not filed since June 30, 2023)	$165	$0	$3,523
Bethany Mann (D)	$4,569	$16,871	$1,690
Source: Federal Election Commission

==== Results ====
Democratic primary results
Party	Candidate	Votes	%
Democratic	Bethany Mann	25,769	73.45%
Democratic	Andrew Daly	9,313	26.55%
Total votes		35,082	100.00%

=== Third-party and independent candidates ===
==== Declared ====
- Bill Hastings (Green), retired college instructor
- Jordan Rowden (Libertarian), realtor

=== General election ===
==== Predictions ====
Source	Ranking	As of
Cook Political Report	Solid R	February 2, 2023
Inside Elections	Solid R	March 10, 2023
Sabato's Crystal Ball	Safe R	February 23, 2023
Elections Daily	Safe R	October 26, 2023
CNalysis	Solid R	November 16, 2023
Decision Desk HQ	Solid R	June 1, 2024

==== Results ====
2024 Missouri's 3rd congressional district election
Party	Candidate	Votes	%
Republican	Bob Onder	240,620	61.31%
Democratic	Bethany Mann	138,532	35.30%
Libertarian	Jordan Rowden	9,298	2.37%
Green	William Hastings	4,013	1.02%
Total votes		392,463	100.00%
Republican hold			

== District 4 ==
2024 Missouri's 4th congressional district election
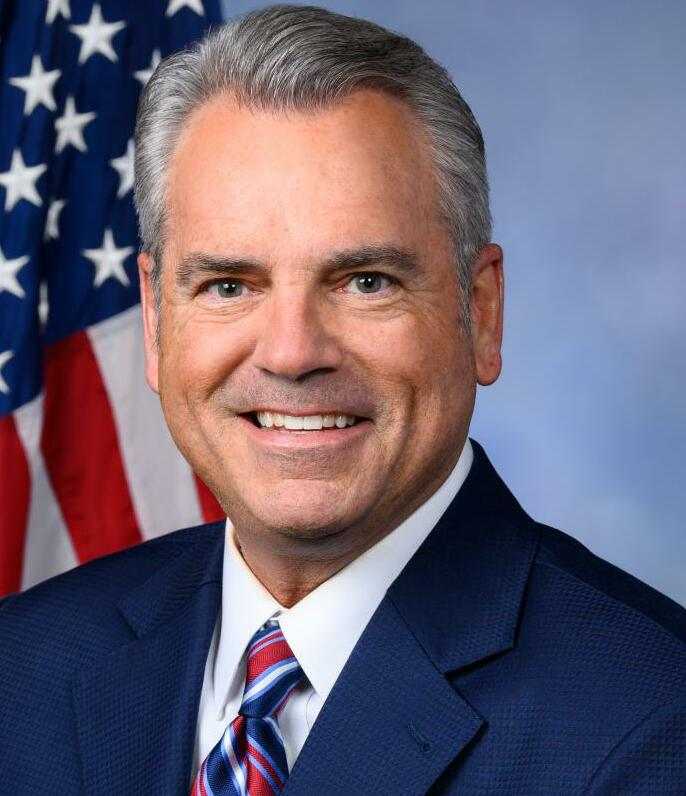

Nominee	Mark Alford	Jeanette Cass
Party	Republican	Democratic
Popular vote	259,886	96,568
Percentage	71.1%	26.4%
- Alford: 40–50% 50–60% 60–70% 70–80% 80–90% >90% Cass: 50–60% 60–70% 70–80% 80–90% >90%
U.S. Representative before election
Mark Alford
Republican
Elected U.S. Representative
Mark Alford
Republican

The 4th district is based in predominantly rural west-central Missouri, taking in Columbia, Sedalia, Warrensburg, and Lebanon. The incumbent was Republican Mark Alford, who was elected with 71.3% of the vote in 2022.

=== Republican primary ===
==== Nominee ====
- Mark Alford, incumbent U.S. representative

==== Endorsements ====
Mark Alford

Organizations

- AIPAC

==== Fundraising ====
Campaign finance reports as of March 31, 2024
Candidate	Raised	Spent	Cash on hand
Mark Alford (R)	$920,865	$648,579	$328,928
Source: Federal Election Commission

==== Results ====
Republican primary results
Party	Candidate	Votes	%
Republican	Mark Alford (incumbent)	99,650	100.0%
Total votes		99,650	100.0%

=== Democratic primary ===
==== Nominee ====
- Jeanette Cass, postal worker

==== Eliminated in primary ====
- Mike McCaffree, real estate broker

==== Results ====
Democratic primary results
Party	Candidate	Votes	%
Democratic	Jeanette Cass	16,077	61.5%
Democratic	Mike McCaffree	10,053	38.5%
Total votes		26,130	100.0%

=== Third-party and independent candidates ===
==== Declared ====
- Alexander Heidenreich (Independent), taxi company owner and progressive activist
- Thomas Holbrook (Libertarian), store cashier and nominee for this district in 2012

=== General election ===
==== Predictions ====
Source	Ranking	As of
Cook Political Report	Solid R	February 2, 2023
Inside Elections	Solid R	March 10, 2023
Sabato's Crystal Ball	Safe R	February 23, 2023
Elections Daily	Safe R	October 26, 2023
CNalysis	Solid R	November 16, 2023
Decision Desk HQ	Solid R	June 1, 2024

==== Results ====
2024 Missouri's 4th congressional district election
Party	Candidate	Votes	%
Republican	Mark Alford (incumbent)	259,886	71.1%
Democratic	Jeanette Cass	96,568	26.4%
Libertarian	Thomas Holbrook	9,240	2.5%
Write-in		2	0.0%
Total votes		365,696	100.0%
Republican hold			

== District 5 ==
2024 Missouri's 5th congressional district election
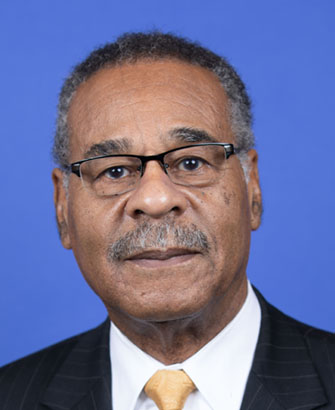

Nominee	Emanuel Cleaver	Sean Smith
Party	Democratic	Republican
Popular vote	199,900	120,957
Percentage	60.2%	36.4%
- Cleaver: 40–50% 50–60% 60–70% 70–80% 80–90% >90% Smith: 40–50% 50–60% 60–70% Tie: 50% No votes
U.S. Representative before election
Emanuel Cleaver
Democratic
Elected U.S. Representative
Emanuel Cleaver
Democratic

The 5th district primarily consists of the inner ring of the Kansas City metropolitan area, including nearly all of Kansas City south of the Missouri River. The incumbent was Democrat Emanuel Cleaver, who was re-elected with 61.0% of the vote in 2022.

=== Democratic primary ===
==== Nominee ====
- Emanuel Cleaver, incumbent U.S. representative

==== Endorsements ====
Emanuel Cleaver

Organizations

- AIPAC
- Humane Society Legislative Fund
- Sierra Club

==== Fundraising ====
Campaign finance reports as of March 31, 2024
Candidate	Raised	Spent	Cash on hand
Emanuel Cleaver (D)	$640,144	$733,050	$868,152
Source: Federal Election Commission

==== Results ====
Democratic primary results
Party	Candidate	Votes	%
Democratic	Emanuel Cleaver (incumbent)	65,248	100.0%
Total votes		65,248	100.0%

=== Republican primary ===
==== Nominee ====
- Sean Smith, Jackson County legislator

==== Fundraising ====
Campaign finance reports as of March 31, 2024
Candidate	Raised	Spent	Cash on hand
Sean Smith (R)	$53,123 (Note: $32,495 of this total was self-funded by Smith.)	$13,961	$39,162
Source: Federal Election Commission

==== Results ====
Republican primary results
Party	Candidate	Votes	%
Republican	Sean Smith	32,574	100.0%
Total votes		32,574	100.0%

=== Third-party and independent candidates ===
==== Declared ====
- Michael Day (Green)
- Bill Wayne (Libertarian), businessman and perennial candidate

=== General election ===
==== Predictions ====
Source	Ranking	As of
Cook Political Report	Solid D	February 2, 2023
Inside Elections	Solid D	March 10, 2023
Sabato's Crystal Ball	Safe D	February 23, 2023
Elections Daily	Safe D	October 26, 2023
CNalysis	Solid D	November 16, 2023
Decision Desk HQ	Solid D	June 1, 2024

==== Results ====
2024 Missouri's 5th congressional district election
Party	Candidate	Votes	%
Democratic	Emanuel Cleaver (incumbent)	199,900	60.2%
Republican	Sean Smith	120,957	36.4%
Libertarian	Bill Wayne	6,658	2.0%
Green	Michael Day	4,414	1.3%
Total votes		331,929	100.0%
Democratic hold			

== District 6 ==
2024 Missouri's 6th congressional district election
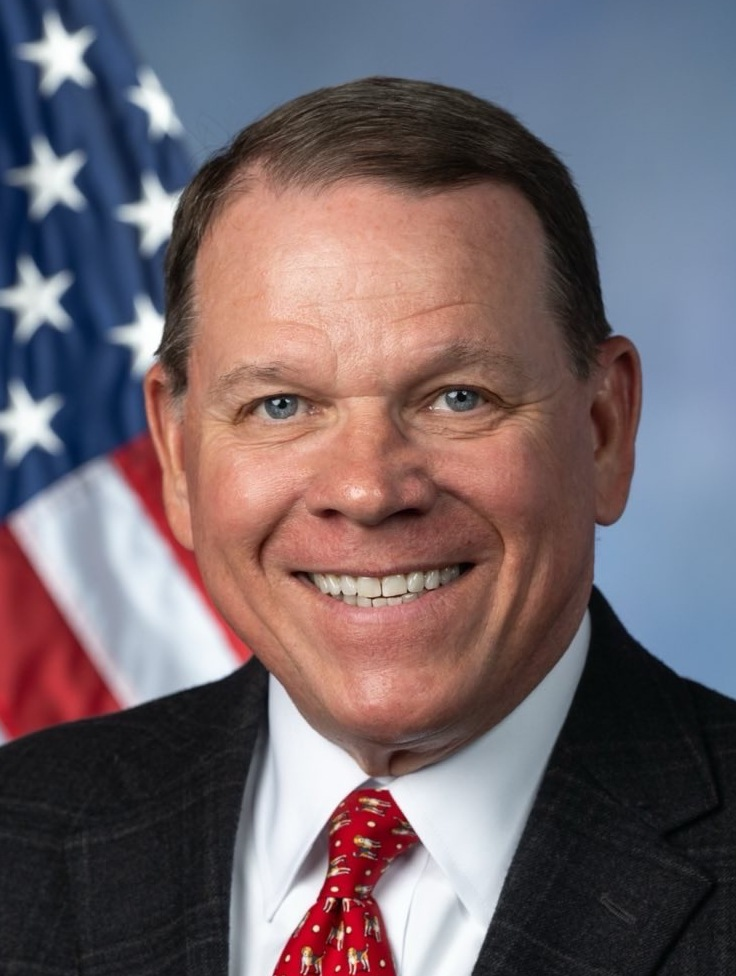

Nominee	Sam Graves	Pam May
Party	Republican	Democratic
Popular vote	265,210	100,999
Percentage	70.7%	26.9%
- Graves: 40–50% 50–60% 60–70% 70–80% 80–90% >90% May: 40–50% 50–60% 80–90%
U.S. Representative before election
Sam Graves
Republican
Elected U.S. Representative
Sam Graves
Republican

The 6th district encompasses rural northern Missouri, St. Joseph and much of Kansas City north of the Missouri River. The incumbent was Republican Sam Graves, who was re-elected with 70.3% of the vote in 2022.

=== Republican primary ===
==== Nominee ====
- Sam Graves, incumbent U.S. representative

==== Eliminated in primary ====
- Freddie Griffin
- Brandon Kleinmeyer, tax preparer and candidate for this district in 2022
- Weldon Woodward, prison guard and candidate for the 5th district in 2020

==== Endorsements ====
Sam Graves

Organizations

- AIPAC

==== Fundraising ====
Campaign finance reports as of March 31, 2024
Candidate	Raised	Spent	Cash on hand
Sam Graves (R)	$1,977,767	$1,051,782	$2,309,258
Source: Federal Election Commission

==== Results ====
Republican primary results
Party	Candidate	Votes	%
Republican	Sam Graves (incumbent)	80,531	78.1%
Republican	Brandon Kleinmeyer	11,086	10.7%
Republican	Freddie Griffin	8,749	8.5%
Republican	Weldon Woodward	2,776	2.7%
Total votes		103,142	100.0%

=== Democratic primary ===
==== Nominee ====
- Pam May

==== Eliminated in primary ====
- Rich Gold, hotel manager

==== Fundraising ====
Campaign finance reports as of March 31, 2024
Candidate	Raised	Spent	Cash on hand
Erik Richardson (D)	$8,920	$3,454	$5,466
Source: Federal Election Commission

==== Results ====
Democratic primary results
Party	Candidate	Votes	%
Democratic	Pam May	20,135	72.1%
Democratic	Rich Gold	7,781	27.9%
Total votes		27,916	100.0%

=== Third-party and independent candidates ===
==== Declared ====
- Mike Diel (Green), landlord and nominee for this district in 2016
- Andy Maidment (Libertarian), network security analyst and nominee for this district in 2022

=== General election ===
==== Predictions ====
Source	Ranking	As of
Cook Political Report	Solid R	February 2, 2023
Inside Elections	Solid R	March 10, 2023
Sabato's Crystal Ball	Safe R	February 23, 2023
Elections Daily	Safe R	October 26, 2023
CNalysis	Solid R	November 16, 2023
Decision Desk HQ	Solid R	June 1, 2024

==== Results ====
2024 Missouri's 6th congressional district election
Party	Candidate	Votes	%
Republican	Sam Graves (incumbent)	265,210	70.7%
Democratic	Pam May	100,999	26.9%
Libertarian	Andy Maidment	5,919	1.6%
Green	Mike Diel	3,058	0.8%
Total votes		375,186	100.0%
Republican hold			

== District 7 ==
2024 Missouri's 7th congressional district election
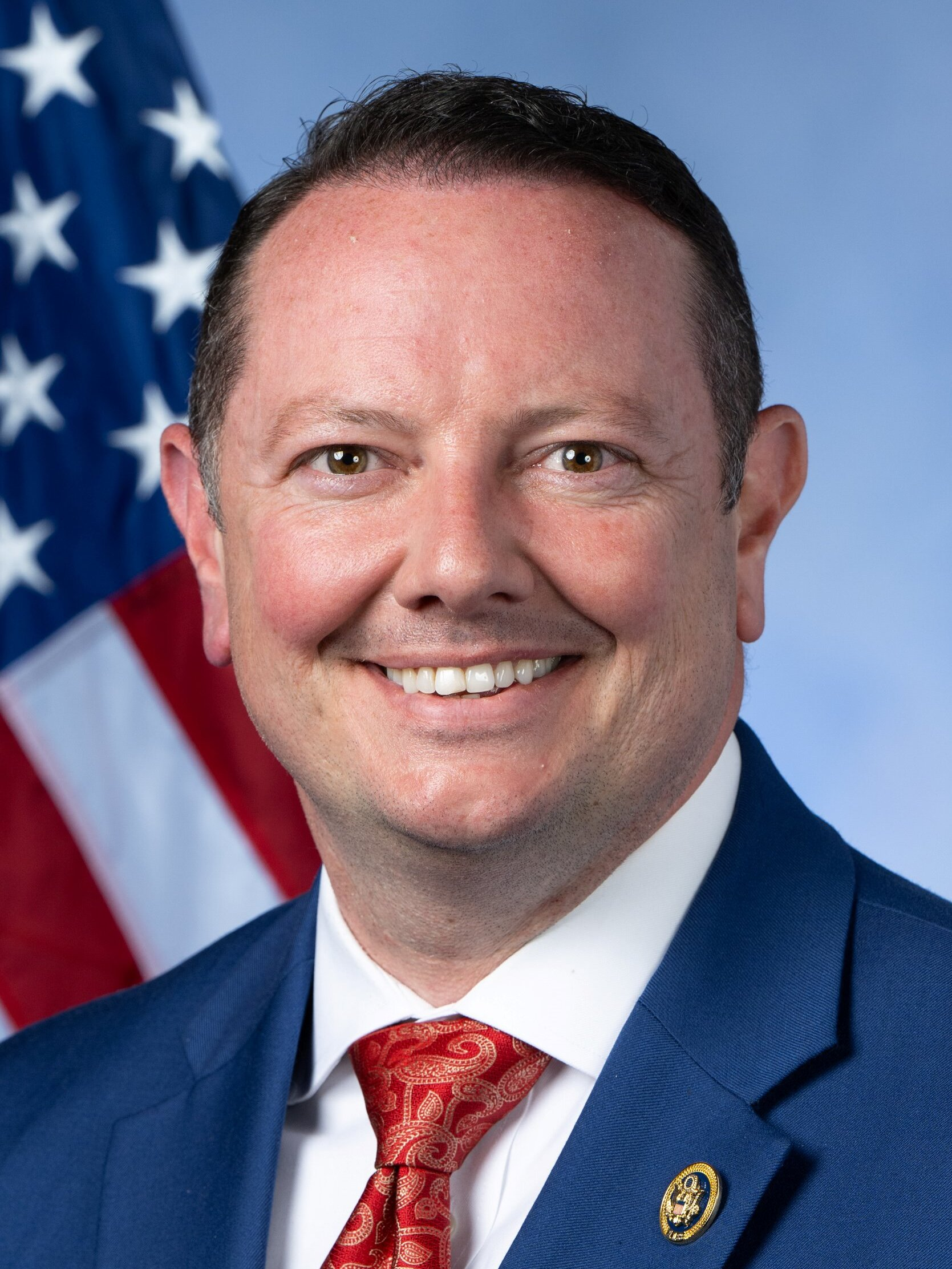

Nominee	Eric Burlison	Missi Hesketh
Party	Republican	Democratic
Popular vote	263,231	96,655
Percentage	71.6%	26.3%
- Burlison: 40–50% 50–60% 60–70% 70–80% 80–90% >90% Hesketh: 40–50% 50–60% 60–70% No votes
U.S. Representative before election
Eric Burlison
Republican
Elected U.S. Representative
Eric Burlison
Republican

The 7th district is located in southwestern Missouri, taking in Springfield, Joplin, Branson, and Nixa. The incumbent was Republican Eric Burlison, who was elected with 70.9% of the vote in 2022.

=== Republican primary ===
==== Nominee ====
- Eric Burlison, incumbent U.S. representative

==== Eliminated in primary ====
- John Adair
- Camille Lombardi-Olive, retired writer and perennial candidate
- Audrey Richards, costume maker and perennial candidate

==== Endorsements ====
Eric Burlison

Organizations

- AIPAC
- Turning Point Action

==== Fundraising ====
Campaign finance reports as of March 31, 2024
Candidate	Raised	Spent	Cash on hand
John Adair (R)	$10,036	$5,654	$4,382
Eric Burlison (R)	$434,307	$248,355	$367,548
Source: Federal Election Commission

==== Results ====
Republican primary results
Party	Candidate	Votes	%
Republican	Eric Burlison (incumbent)	79,755	83.1%
Republican	Audrey Richards	6,444	6.7%
Republican	John Adair	6,358	6.6%
Republican	Camille Lombardi-Olive	3,400	3.5%
Total votes		95,957	100.0%

=== Democratic primary ===
==== Nominee ====
- Missi Hesketh, mayor of Forsyth

==== Fundraising ====
Campaign finance reports as of March 31, 2024
Candidate	Raised	Spent	Cash on hand
Missi Hesketh (D)	$10,262	$3,345	$7,078
Source: Federal Election Commission

==== Results ====
Democratic primary results
Party	Candidate	Votes	%
Democratic	Missi Hesketh	21,854	100.0%
Total votes		21,854	100.0%

=== Third-party and independent candidates ===
==== Declared ====
- Kevin Craig (Libertarian), Christian anarchist group founder and nominee for this district in 2004, 2006, 2008, 2010, 2012, 2014, 2020, and 2022

=== General election ===
==== Predictions ====
Source	Ranking	As of
Cook Political Report	Solid R	February 2, 2023
Inside Elections	Solid R	March 10, 2023
Sabato's Crystal Ball	Safe R	February 23, 2023
Elections Daily	Safe R	October 26, 2023
CNalysis	Solid R	November 16, 2023
Decision Desk HQ	Solid R	June 1, 2024

==== Results ====
2024 Missouri's 7th congressional district election
Party	Candidate	Votes	%
Republican	Eric Burlison (incumbent)	263,231	71.6%
Democratic	Missi Hesketh	96,655	26.3%
Libertarian	Kevin Craig	7,982	2.2%
Total votes		367,868	100.0%
Republican hold			

== District 8 ==
2024 Missouri's 8th congressional district election
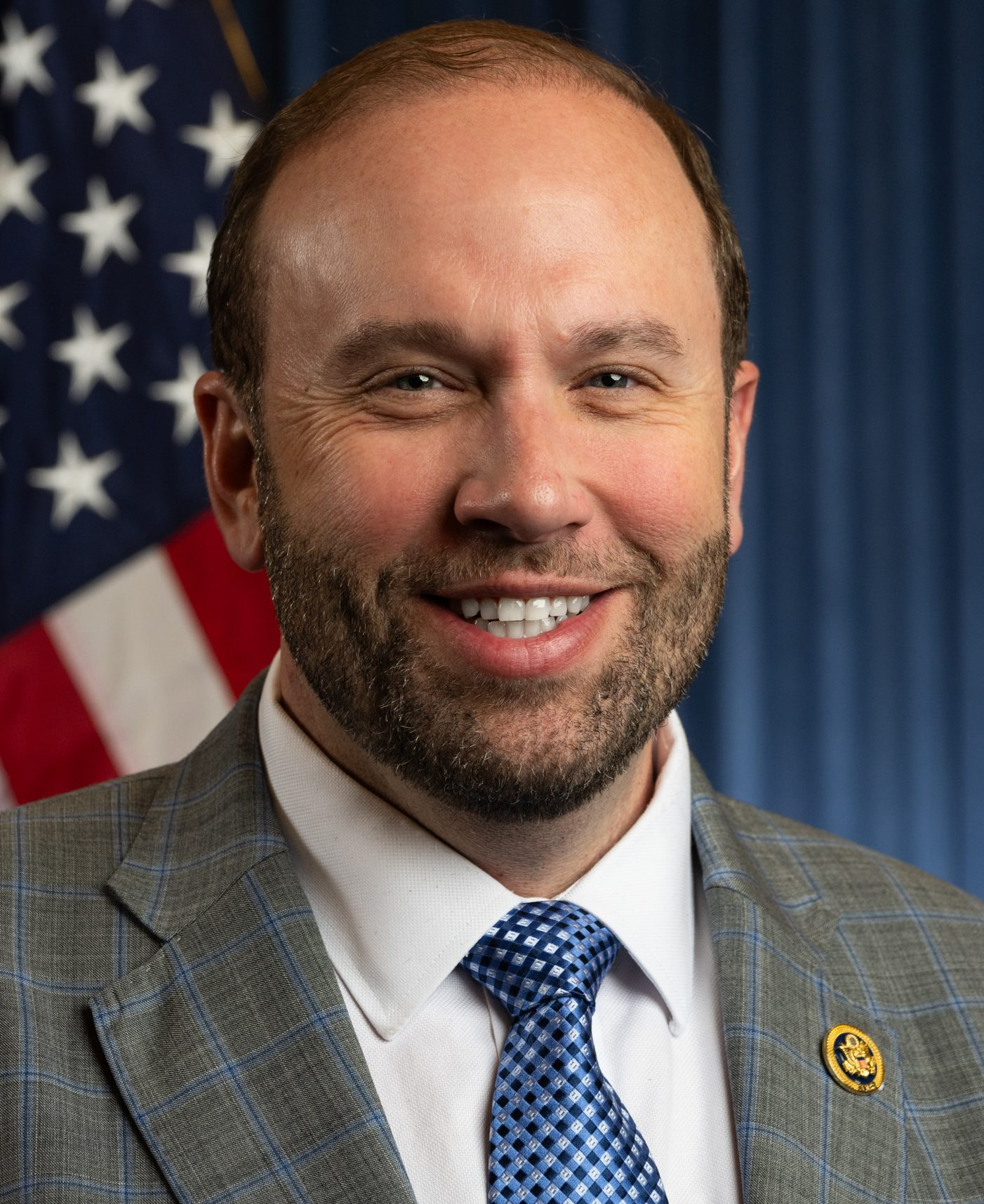

Nominee	Jason Smith	Randi McCallian
Party	Republican	Democratic
Popular vote	271,249	77,649
Percentage	76.2%	21.8%
- Smith: 40–50% 50–60% 60–70% 70–80% 80–90% >90% McCallian: 50–60% 60–70% 80–90%
U.S. Representative before election
Jason Smith
Republican
Elected U.S. Representative
Jason Smith
Republican

The 8th district is the most rural district of Missouri, taking in rural southeastern Missouri, including the Missouri Bootheel, as well as the cities of Cape Girardeau and Poplar Bluff. The incumbent was Republican Jason Smith, who was re-elected with 76.0% of the vote in 2022.

=== Republican primary ===
==== Nominee ====
- Jason Smith, incumbent U.S. representative

==== Eliminated in primary ====
- Grant Heithold
- James Snider, flooring installer

==== Results ====
Republican primary results
Party	Candidate	Votes	%
Republican	Jason Smith (incumbent)	98,171	82.3%
Republican	James Snider	10,987	9.2%
Republican	Grant Heithold	10,149	8.5%
Total votes		119,307	100.0%

=== Fundraising ===
Campaign finance reports as of March 31, 2024
Candidate	Raised	Spent	Cash on hand
Jason Smith (R)	$4,268,056	$2,095,551	$2,660,454
Source: Federal Election Commission

=== Democratic primary ===
==== Nominee ====
- Randi McCallian, member of the Phelps County Emergency Services Board and nominee for this district in 2022

==== Eliminated in primary ====
- Denny Roth, teacher

==== Endorsements ====
Denny Roth

Organizations

- Freethought Equality Fund

==== Results ====
Democratic primary results
Party	Candidate	Votes	%
Democratic	Randi McCallian	12,571	70.4%
Democratic	Denny Roth	5,283	29.6%
Total votes		17,854	100.0%

=== Fundraising ===
Campaign finance reports as of March 31, 2024
Candidate	Raised	Spent	Cash on hand
Randi McCallian (D)	$22,787 (Note: $3,000 of this total was self-funded by McCallian)	$23,359	$7,838
Denny Roth (D)	$12,724 (Note: $2,859 of this total was self-funded by Roth)	$10,304	$2,420
Source: Federal Election Commission

=== Third-party and independent candidates ===
==== Declared ====
- Jake Dawson (Libertarian)

=== General election ===
==== Predictions ====
Source	Ranking	As of
Cook Political Report	Solid R	February 2, 2023
Inside Elections	Solid R	March 10, 2023
Sabato's Crystal Ball	Safe R	February 23, 2023
Elections Daily	Safe R	October 26, 2023
CNalysis	Solid R	November 16, 2023
Decision Desk HQ	Solid R	June 1, 2024

==== Results ====
2024 Missouri's 8th congressional district election
Party	Candidate	Votes	%
Republican	Jason Smith (incumbent)	271,249	76.2%
Democratic	Randi McCallian	77,649	21.8%
Libertarian	Jake Dawson	7,166	2.0%
Total votes		356,064	100.0%
Republican hold			

== See also ==
- 2024 Missouri elections

== Notes ==
Partisan clients
