= Missouri's 14th Senate district =

American legislative district

Missouri's 14th State Senate district
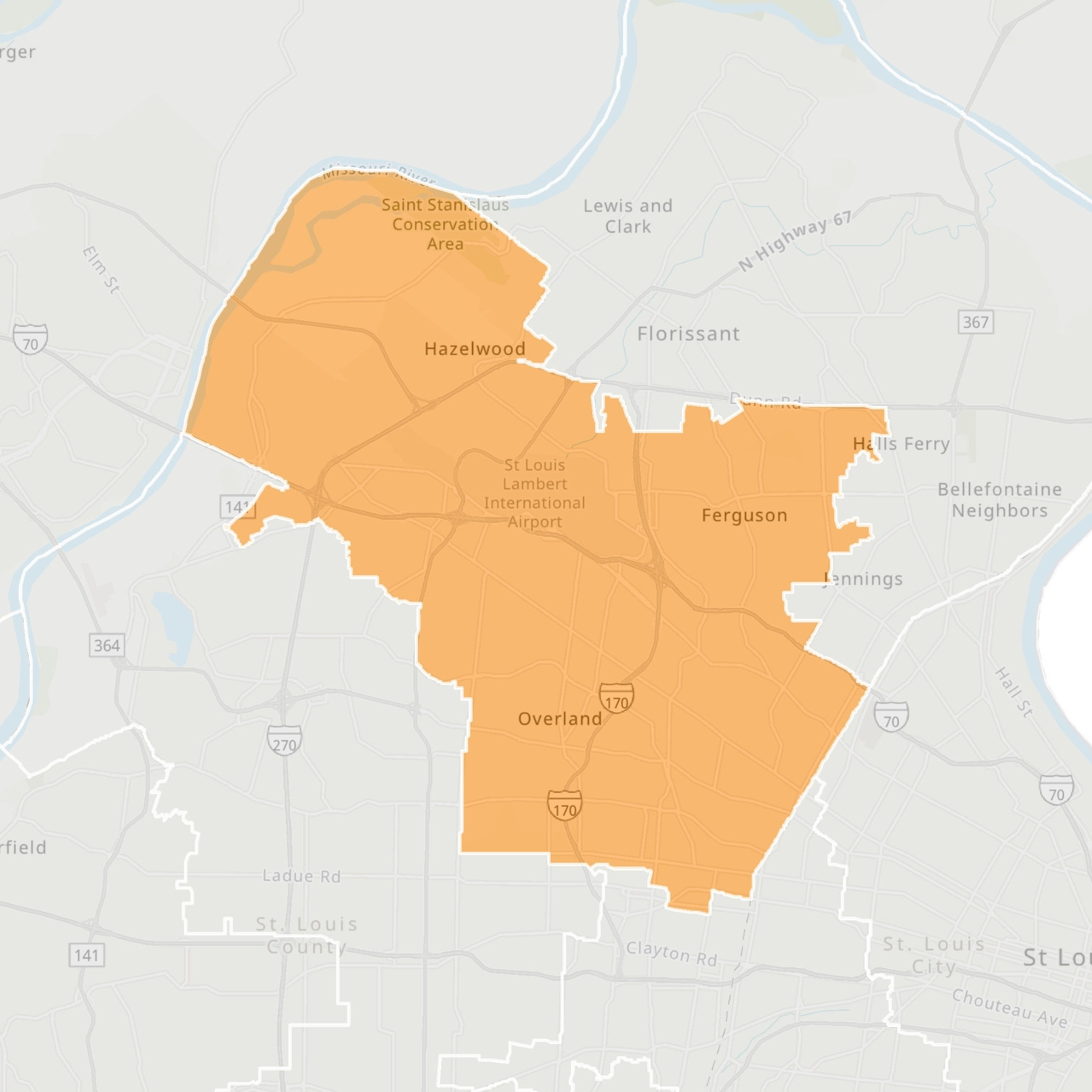
Senator
Brian Williams; D–University City
- Demographics: 39% White; 46% Black; 7% Hispanic; 3% Asian; 5% Multiracial
- Population (2023): 187,652

Missouri's 14th Senatorial District is one of 34 districts in the Missouri Senate. The district has been represented by Democrat Brian Williams since 2019.

== Geography ==
The district is based in northern St. Louis County. Major municipalities in the district include Ferguson, Overland, and University City. The district is also home to St. Louis Lambert International Airport and the University of Missouri–St. Louis.

== Potential 2026 candidates ==
=== Democratic primary ===
- John Bowman, president of the St. Louis County NAACP and former state representative
- Shante Duncan, consultant
- Joseph Palm, former Biden administration aide
- Raychel Proudie, representative of Missouri House District 73

== Election results (1998–2022) ==
=== 1998 ===
Missouri's 14th Senatorial District election (1998)
Party	Candidate	Votes	%
Democratic	John D. Schneider	37,089	100.0
Total votes		37,089	100.0

=== 2002 ===
Missouri's 14th Senatorial District election (2002)
Party	Candidate	Votes	%
Democratic	Rita Heard Days	39,766	100.0
Total votes		39,766	100.0
Democratic hold			

=== 2006 ===
Missouri's 14th Senatorial District election (2006)
Party	Candidate	Votes	%
Democratic	Rita Heard Days (incumbent)	42,489	100.0
Total votes		42,489	100.0
Democratic hold			

=== 2010 ===
Missouri's 14th Senatorial District election (2010)
Party	Candidate	Votes	%
Democratic	Maria Chappelle-Nadal	38,197	100.0
Total votes		38,197	100.0
Democratic hold			

=== 2014 ===
Missouri's 14th Senatorial District election (2014)
Party	Candidate	Votes	%
Democratic	Maria Chappelle-Nadal (incumbent)	30,203	94.2
Write-In	Christine LaPorta	1,869	5.8
Total votes		32,072	100.0
Democratic hold			

=== 2018 ===
Missouri's 14th Senatorial District election (2018)
Party	Candidate	Votes	%
Democratic	Brian Williams	53,234	100.0
Total votes		53,234	100.0
Democratic hold			

=== 2022 ===
Missouri's 14th Senatorial District election (2022)
Party	Candidate	Votes	%
Democratic	Brian Williams (incumbent)	41,832	100.0
Total votes		41,832	100.0
Democratic hold			

== Statewide election results ==
Year	Office	Results
2008	President	Obama 78.4 – 20.5%
2012	President	Obama 78.4 – 21.6%
2016	President	Clinton 73.8 – 22.1%
2016	Senate	Kander 76.4 – 19.7%
2016	Governor	Koster 75.1 – 21.5%
2018	Senate	McCaskill 78.6 – 18.9%
2020	President	Biden 76.7 – 21.7%
2020	Governor	Galloway 74.7 – 22.7%
