= Hazel Erby =

American politician (1945–2021)

Member of the St. Louis County Council from the first district
- In office 2004–2019
- Preceded by: Charlie Dooley
- Succeeded by: Rita Heard Days

Personal details
- Born: September 22, 1945
- Died: July 2, 2021 (aged 75)
- Party: Democratic
- Spouse: Louis
- Children: 3
- Education: Lincoln University; Harris–Stowe State University

Hazel M. Erby (September 22, 1945 – July 2, 2021) was an American politician who was a Democratic member of the St. Louis County Council. In 2004, she became the first Black woman on the council and then represented the first district from 2004 to 2019. In 2009, she became the first Black woman to chair the council. In 2019, she became the first Director of Diversity and Inclusion in St. Louis County.

== Early life and education ==
Erby graduated from Vashon High School and attended Lincoln University and Harris–Stowe State University.

== Career ==
Before Erby was elected to the St. Louis County council in 2004, she was president of the Parent Teacher Organization of several schools in University City and a Democratic committeewoman of the University Township. She also worked as the executive director for the Community Partnership for the Prevention of Drug and Substance Abuse, site director for the Caring Communities Program at Barbara C. Jordan School in University City, and founder of TAP City Program in University City, the program that paired teenagers with senior citizens to assist the seniors with errands and chores. She was a member of the National Council of Negro Women and a board member of the Asthma and Allergy Foundation of America.

She was a member of the St. Louis County Council from 2004 to 2019, after winning a special election and then winning reelection in 2006, 2010 and 2014. She represented the first district, which includes Ferguson, Missouri. In 2009, she became the first Black woman to chair the council. When the killing of Michael Brown occurred in August 2014, she was the only Black member of the council and later became a leader of the Fannie Lou Hamer Coalition, a political advocacy group composed of Black elected officials.

During her tenure on the county council, she was instrumental in developing support for the 2018 legislation that created standards for minority participation in county contracts. In 2019, she negotiated funding for a recreation center in north St. Louis County.

In 2019, she was hired by County Executive Sam Page as the first director of diversity, equity and inclusion for St. Louis County, and then was fired in August 2020. In October 2020, she filed a whistleblower lawsuit and an employment discrimination claim against the county, alleging retaliation for her complaints related to the exclusion of minorities from county contracts.

== Personal life ==
Erby was married to her husband Louis for 56 years. They resided in University City for more than fifty years, and had three children.

== Death and legacy ==
Erby died on July 2, 2021, at the age of 75 from pancreatic cancer. After her death, she was described as one of the "Matriarchs of Black Politics" in St. Louis by St. Louis Public Radio. Before she died, the Missouri Legislature declared her birthday, September 22, "Hazel Erby Day."

== Electoral history ==
2004 St. Louis County Council 1st district special election
Party	Candidate	Votes	%	±%
Democratic	Hazel Erby	7,717	66.34	
Republican	John W. Scates	2,101	18.06	
Independent	Carlton Jones	1,814	15.56	

2006 St. Louis County Council 1st district general election
Party	Candidate	Votes	%	±%
Democratic	Hazel Erby	36,596	99.51	

2010 St. Louis County Council 1st district general election
Party	Candidate	Votes	%	±%
Democratic	Hazel Erby	34,873	99.16	
