= Senator Schneider =

Senator Schneider may refer to:

- Charles Schneider (politician) (born 1973), Iowa State Senate
- Elizabeth Schneider (born 1962), Maine State Senate
- John D. Schneider (1937–2017), Missouri State Senate
- John R. Schneider (1937–2002), Maryland State Senate
- Mac Schneider (born 1979), North Dakota State Senate
- Michael A. Schneider (born 1950), Nevada State Senate
- Philip Schneider (1826–1902), Wisconsin State Senate
- Scott Schneider (fl. 1980s–2010s), Indiana State Senate
