= Pat Dolan (politician) =

Former member of the St. Louis County Council from the fifth district
- Incumbent
- Assumed office 2011
- Preceded by: Barbara Fraser

Personal details
- Party: Democratic
- Spouse: Jean
- Children: Patrick; Christopher
- Occupation: United Fire Protection Systems-Supervisor

Patrick M. "Pat" Dolan is an American, supervisor with the United Fire Protection Systems, and Democratic former member of the St. Louis County Council. He has represented the fifth district since 2011.

== Early life and career ==
Pat Dolan graduated from Christian Brothers College High School in 1973. He is a supervisor with the United Fire Protection Systems. He has been the Secretary/ Treasurer of the St. Louis City Labor Club, President of Sprinkler Fitters Local 268, and a backstopper. He is married, has two kids, and attends the Little Flower Catholic Church in Richmond Heights. He used to be on the parish council there.

== Political career ==
Pat Dolan was on the City of Richmond Heights Council for eight years. He has been a St. Louis County Council since 2011. He represents the 5th district which contains about 145,000 people in mid St. Louis County.

=== Committee assignments ===
- Committee of the Whole
- Justice, Health, and Welfare
- Public Improvements

== Electoral history ==
2010 St. Louis County Council 5th district general election
Party	Candidate	Votes	%	±%
Democratic	Pat Dolan	30,317	52.98	
Republican	Randy Jotte	26,839	46.90	

2000 Richmond Heights City Council 1st district election
Party	Candidate	Votes	%	±%
Nonpartisan	Patrick M. Dolan	176	42.00	
Nonpartisan	Paul W. Lore	243	58.00	
