= Maria Chappelle-Nadal =

American politician (born 1974)

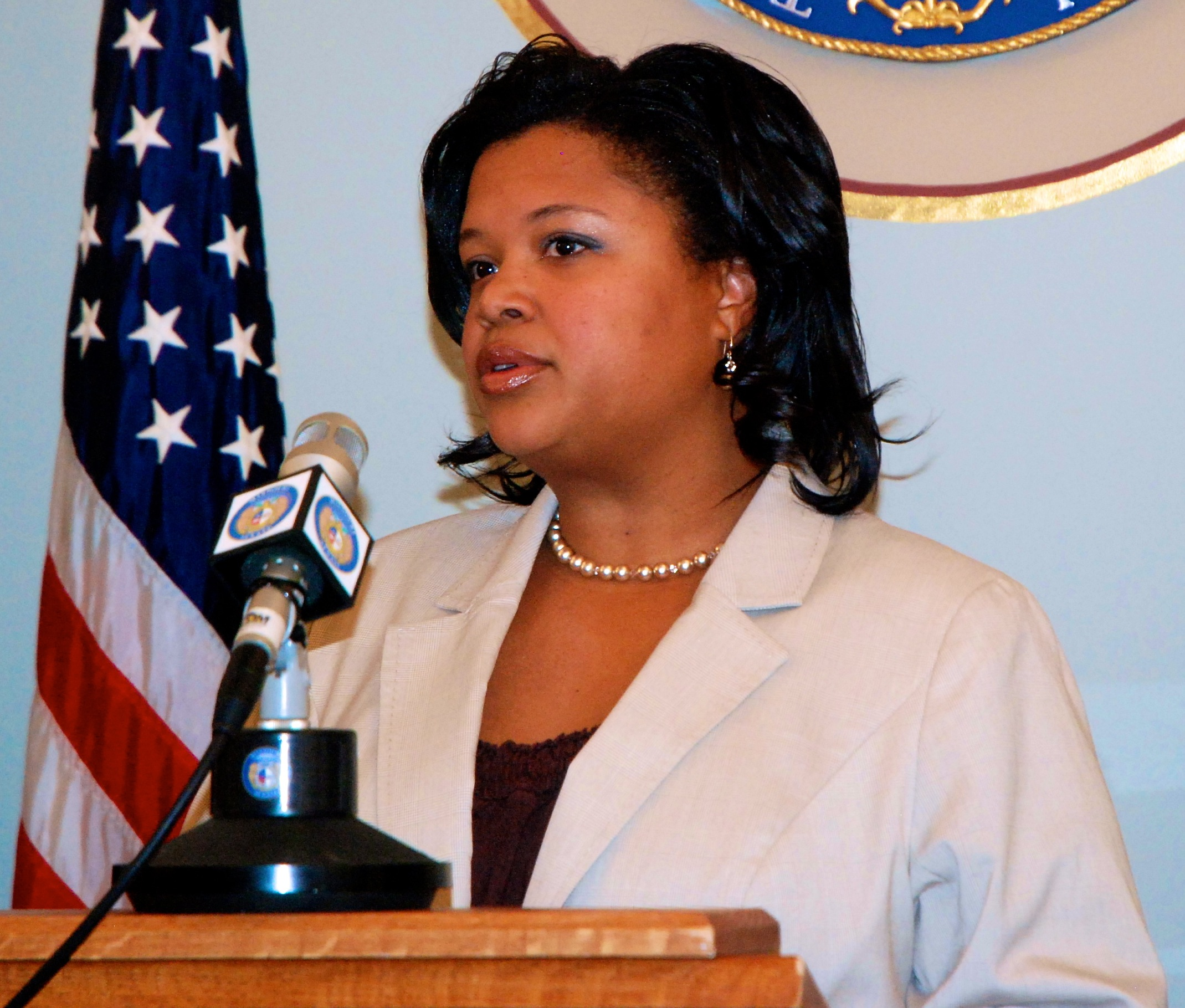

Member of the Missouri House of Representatives from the 86th district
- In office January 9, 2019 – January 6, 2021
- Preceded by: Joe Adams
- Succeeded by: Joe Adams

Member of the Missouri Senate from the 14th district
- In office January 5, 2011 – January 9, 2019
- Preceded by: Rita Heard Days
- Succeeded by: Brian Williams

Member of the Missouri House of Representatives from the 72nd district
- In office January 5, 2005 – January 5, 2011
- Preceded by: Betty L. Thompson
- Succeeded by: Rory Ellinger

Personal details
- Born: October 3, 1974 (age 51) University City, Missouri, U.S.
- Party: Democratic
- Education: Georgia State University (BA)

Maria Nicole Chappelle-Nadal (born October 3, 1974) is an American politician who served in the Missouri House of Representatives from the 86th district from 2019 to 2021. A Democrat from University City, Missouri, she represented district 14 in the Missouri Senate from 2011 to 2019. She previously served in the Missouri House of Representatives from district 72, a position which she held from 2005 to 2011. In 2010, Chappelle-Nadal was elected to the Missouri Senate to succeed fellow Democrat Rita Heard Days of St. Louis.

As a state senator Chappelle-Nadal was a prominent critic of the Ferguson police shooting of Michael Brown in August 2014.

In August 2017, Missouri Democrats U.S. Senator Claire McCaskill and Representative William Lacy Clay were among the state and national politicians calling for her resignation after she made a social media comment where she said, "I hope Trump is assassinated", referring to U.S. President Donald Trump. In response to her comments, Senate Democratic Leader Gina Walsh removed her from all Senate committee assignments. On September 13, 2017, Chappelle-Nadal was formally censured by the Missouri State Senate for her comments.

Chappelle-Nadal announced her candidacy in the 2024 United States House of Representatives elections in Missouri against incumbent Cori Bush and prosecutor Wesley Bell, asserting that she has more legislative experience than both candidates combined. Chappelle-Nadal and Bush were both defeated by Bell in the August 6, 2024 Democratic Primary.

== Early life and education ==
Chappelle-Nadal is a University City native. She received a dual degree in political science and sociology from Georgia State University. In 2002, Chappelle-Nadal was one of sixteen national fellows chosen by the National Organization for Black Elected Legislative/Women and the Center for American Women in Politics (CAWP) at Rutgers University to attend a national program for women in public policy and politics. She is a former participant in the Sue Shear Institute for Women in Public Life (2004) and the Neighborhood Leadership Academy (2002) at the University of Missouri-St. Louis. Her maternal grandfather was originally from Ponce, Puerto Rico.

== Political career ==
=== Missouri House of Representatives ===
Chappelle-Nadal was first elected to the Missouri House of Representatives in 2004, representing District 72. She was re-elected in 2006 and 2008, serving in this office until her successful state senate campaign in 2010. While in office, she served on the Ways and Means, Small Business and Senior Citizen Advocacy Committees.

=== Missouri Senate ===
Chappelle-Nadal was first elected state senator of District 14 in 2010, and successfully ran for re-election in 2014. She chose not to run for reelection in 2018 and was succeeded by Democrat Brian Williams, who won a three-way primary and was unopposed in the general election.

==== Role in filibusters ====
Chappelle-Nadal is known for filibustering bills. In February 2012, Chappelle-Nadal led a 14-hour filibuster of a bill that would have weakened existing law preventing discrimination in the workplace. Chappelle-Nadal herself filibustered the bill for 10 hours and 45 minutes of the 14-hour filibuster. The compromise which ended the filibuster "removed language which would have required a judge, not a jury, to review facts in worker discrimination cases." In March 2016, she led a 39-hour filibuster of a bill that would have legalized discrimination against gay couples. After passing the 24-hour mark, former Texas State Senator Wendy Davis, known for her own 11-hour filibuster of a bill restricting abortions, tweeted an offer to loan Chappelle-Nadal "a certain pair of shoes for the [filibuster]." In April 2016, Chappelle-Nadal filibustered a bill regarding sales tax by reading "The 50th Law", an autobiography detailing the life and career of rapper 50 Cent. Chappelle-Nadal filibustered the bill because St. Louis County had not agreed to a consent decree proposed by the Department of Justice that was offered to the Ferguson Police Department following the use of tear gas and excessive force against protesters.

==== Radioactive waste legislation ====
Chappelle-Nadal has raised awareness of radioactive waste in the St. Louis region. Individuals living near the West Lake landfill and Coldwater Creek have reported a number of health problems, including cancer and autoimmune diseases. In 2012, Chappelle-Nadal wrote an article for Patch Media in which she criticized the Environmental Protection Agency for failing to clean up the waste and acknowledge the threat posed by its existence in the West Lake Landfill. In 2013, Chappelle-Nadal proposed Senate Concurrent Resolution 11 which urged Congress to "transfer authority for the remediation of the West Lake Landfill radioactive waste from the EPA to the Corps of Engineers' Formerly Utilized Sites Remedial Action Program (FUSRAP)." In 2014, Chappelle-Nadal proposed Senate Concurrent Resolution 23, which mirrored SCR 11. In January 2016, Chappelle-Nadal proposed Senate Bill 600 which would have created a buyout program of contaminated homes near the Bridgeton Landfill. In 2017, Chappelle-Nadal proposed Senate Bill 22 which would create a $12 million buyout program that would purchase homes contaminated with radioactive waste within a radius of the Bridgeton Landfills. On April 12, 2017, Senate Bill 22 was approved by the Missouri Senate and sent to the Missouri House of Representatives.

==== Town hall meetings ====
On September 6, 2015, Chappelle-Nadal held her first town hall meeting in St. Louis regarding radioactive waste resulting from processing uranium ore for the Manhattan Project during World War II. Chappelle-Nadal has since held 70 town hall meetings and aims to hold a total of 100 town hall meetings by the end of 2017. Chappelle-Nadal believes that part of the solution is to convene a congressional investigatory panel focusing on the EPA's inaction on legacy nuclear waste contamination in the St. Louis region.

==== Trump assassination social media post ====
On August 17, 2017, in response to the Unite the Right rally in Charlottesville, Virginia, Chappelle-Nadal replied to a comment on one of her Facebook posts, writing "I hope Trump is assassinated!" She then deleted the comment, though it quickly spread online. The U.S. Secret Service said it was investigating her comment. Chappelle-Nadal later told KMOV, "No, I don't want to see anyone assassinated, but he should not be president, he should be impeached." She later issued a formal apology for her comments.

Missouri U.S. Senator Claire McCaskill, Congressman Lacy Clay, and Missouri Senate Minority Leader Gina Walsh were among the state and national Democrats calling for her resignation. The St. Louis Post-Dispatch has called for her resignation. In response to Chappelle-Nadal's social media post State Representative Joshua Peters sent a letter to the chairman of the Rules, Joint Rules, Resolutions and Ethics Committee, requesting that a special committee consider Chappelle-Nadal's "censure or removal" from office. Missouri Lt. Governor Mike Parson's office said he would call for Chappelle-Nadal's expulsion from office under Article III, Section 18 of the Missouri Constitution, which allows the Missouri Senate to expel a member with a two-thirds vote. On August 22, Senate Democratic Caucus Leader, Senator Gina Walsh, removed Chappelle-Nadal from all Senate committee assignments due to her comments.

=== Other roles ===
Chappelle-Nadal is a former member of the Democratic National Committee, serving from 2005 to 2009. Chappelle-Nadal worked as director of communications for Lt. Governor Joe Maxwell in 2010. She also served as the director of boards and commissions, later becoming Missouri's senior advocate. Legislation associated with her work in these roles includes the Senior Care and Protection Act of 2003, and the Missouri Senior Rx Generic Drug Rebate. In addition, Chappelle-Nadal was one of Missouri's superdelegates to the 2008 Democratic National Convention in Denver, Colorado. Chappelle-Nadal currently serves as director on the University City School Board.

Chappelle-Nadal worked as a legislative aid to former St. Louis County Council Chair Rita Heard Days November 2020 – August 2022. She filed a discrimination claim over her dismissal, which was settled in 2023.

== Role in Ferguson unrest ==
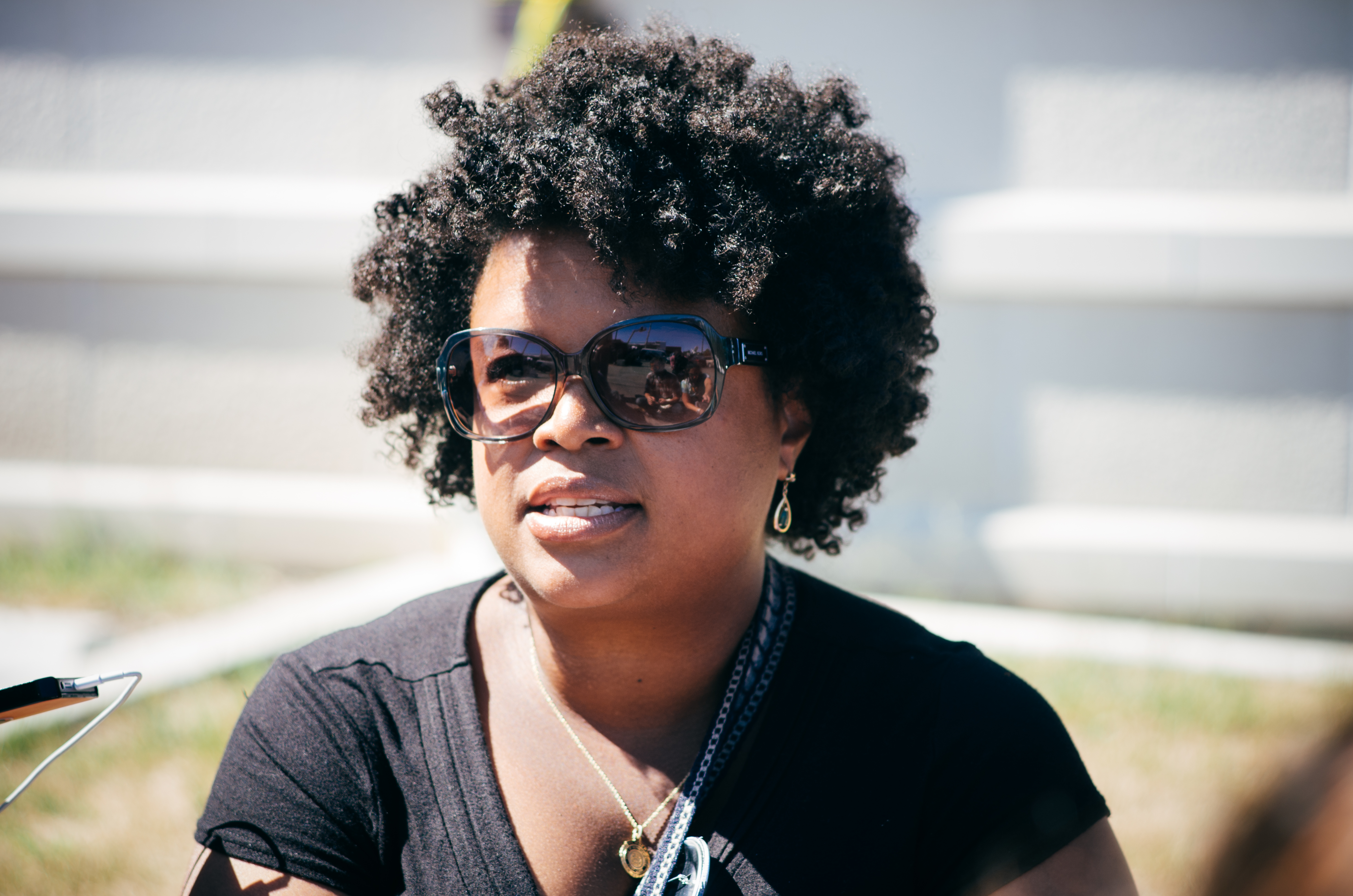
Chappelle-Nadal during the Ferguson unrest

Chappelle-Nadal took part in the protests over the shooting of Michael Brown in Ferguson, Missouri in August 2014. She criticized the police response to the civil unrest and the way the crisis was handled within the community. During the protests, Chappelle-Nadal was among the protesters who were tear-gassed by law enforcement officials.

Chappelle-Nadal asserted that institutional inequality is a major issue underpinning the unrest in Ferguson, contributing to tensions between police and an angered community: "I have to tell you that there has been systematic racism, institutionally in state government for decades, including my own state party," she said. "People are angry, and they are hurt, and they're trying to figure out: how are they going to receive justice?" Chappelle-Nadal proposed legislation in 2015 to re-examine policies related to use of deadly force and proper legal procedures following officer-involved deaths.

During the unrest, Chappelle-Nadal sent several expletive-laden tweets to then Governor Jay Nixon criticizing him for his response to the protests and riots.
