= Joe Adams (Missouri politician) =

American politician (born 1944)

Member of the Missouri House of Representatives from the 86th district
- In office 2021–2025
- Preceded by: Maria Chappelle-Nadal
- Succeeded by: Jeff Hales

Member of the Missouri House of Representatives from the 86th district
- In office 2015–2019
- Preceded by: Rory Ellinger
- Succeeded by: Maria Chappelle-Nadal

Personal details
- Born: January 4, 1944 (age 82) Kansas City, Missouri, U.S.
- Party: Democratic
- Spouse: Nancy
- Children: 4
- Profession: Academic, professor

Joe Adams (born January 4, 1944) is an American politician who served as a member of the Missouri House of Representatives, from 2015 to 2019, succeeding Rory Ellinger. He was succeeded by Maria Chappelle-Nadal for one term, then after she stepped down, was elected again to his old seat in 2020, taking office in 2021 and serving until 2025. He is a member of the Democratic Party.

== Personal ==
In 1960s, Adams served in the United States Air Force. He was a history professor at St. Louis Community College–Meramec where he taught American and African-American History for over 30 years.

Adams is a 1962 graduate of DeLaSalle High School. He earned his bachelor's degree in history from the University of Missouri-Kansas City in 1970 and went on to receive his an MA in urban American history from UMKC as well in 1971.

He has been a member of the following organizations: Missouri Historic Record Commission, Loop Trolley Board of Directors, National League of Cities, Missouri Commission on Intergovernmental Cooperation, Missouri Episcopal Diocese Commission on Ministry Board and Episcopal Cathedral Chapter Board. He served as President of the St. Louis County Municipal League, Missouri Municipal League and the Mayors of Large Cities of St. Louis County.

Adams received a variety of awards, including the Royal Vagabonds African-American Trailblazer Award; the City of University City Meritorious Service Award; the City of University City Gates of Opportunity Service Award; the St. Louis Legend Award; and the Buzz Westfall Award. In 1998, he was a member of the Leadership St. Louis.

== Political career ==
From 1975 to 1995, Joe Adams served as the Ward 2 Councilman on the City Council of University City, Missouri. In 1995, Adams was elected Mayor of University City. He served as Mayor until 2010. From 2008 to 2009, Adams served as President of the Saint Louis County Municipal League. In 2014, Adams was elected to the Missouri State House of Representatives.

Adams represented District 86, which includes parts of St. Louis County including University City, Pagedale, Vinita Park, Wellston, Vinita Terrace and Hanley Hills in the Missouri House of Representatives. After trying to win the Democratic nomination for state senator in 2018, he ran again for his old seat in the House, winning in 2020.

== Electoral history ==
=== State representative ===
Missouri House of Representatives Primary Election, August 5, 2014, District 86
Party	Candidate	Votes	%	±%
Democratic	Joe Adams	2,392	48.33%	
Democratic	Mary Ann Mertz	1,728	34.92%	
Democratic	Dawn Price	480	9.70%	
Democratic	Fareedah S. Sidqui	349	7.05%	
Total votes		4,949	100.00	

Missouri House of Representatives Election, November 4, 2014, District 86
Party	Candidate	Votes	%	±%
Democratic	Joe Adams	8,201	100.00%	

Missouri House of Representatives Election, November 8, 2016, District 86
Party	Candidate	Votes	%	±%
Democratic	Joe Adams	14,582	86.46%	−13.54
Independent	Joy Elliott	2,284	13.54%	+13.54
Total votes		16,866	100.00%	

Missouri House of Representatives Election, November 3, 2020, District 86
Party	Candidate	Votes	%	±%
Democratic	Joe Adams	15,835	100.00%	

Missouri House of Representatives Election, November 8, 2022, District 86
Party	Candidate	Votes	%	±%
Democratic	Joe Adams	11,582	100.00%	

=== State Senate ===
Missouri Senate Primary Election, August 7, 2018, District 14
Party	Candidate	Votes	%	±%
Democratic	Brian Williams	12,615	40.19%	
Democratic	Sharon L. Pace	11,782	37.53%	
Democratic	Joe Adams	6,993	22.28%	

== Committee membership ==
At the beginning of the 2017 legislative session, Adams served on the following committees:

- Local Government – Ranking Minority Member
- Elections and Elected Officials
- Higher Education
