= Wesley Bell =

American attorney and politician (born 1974)

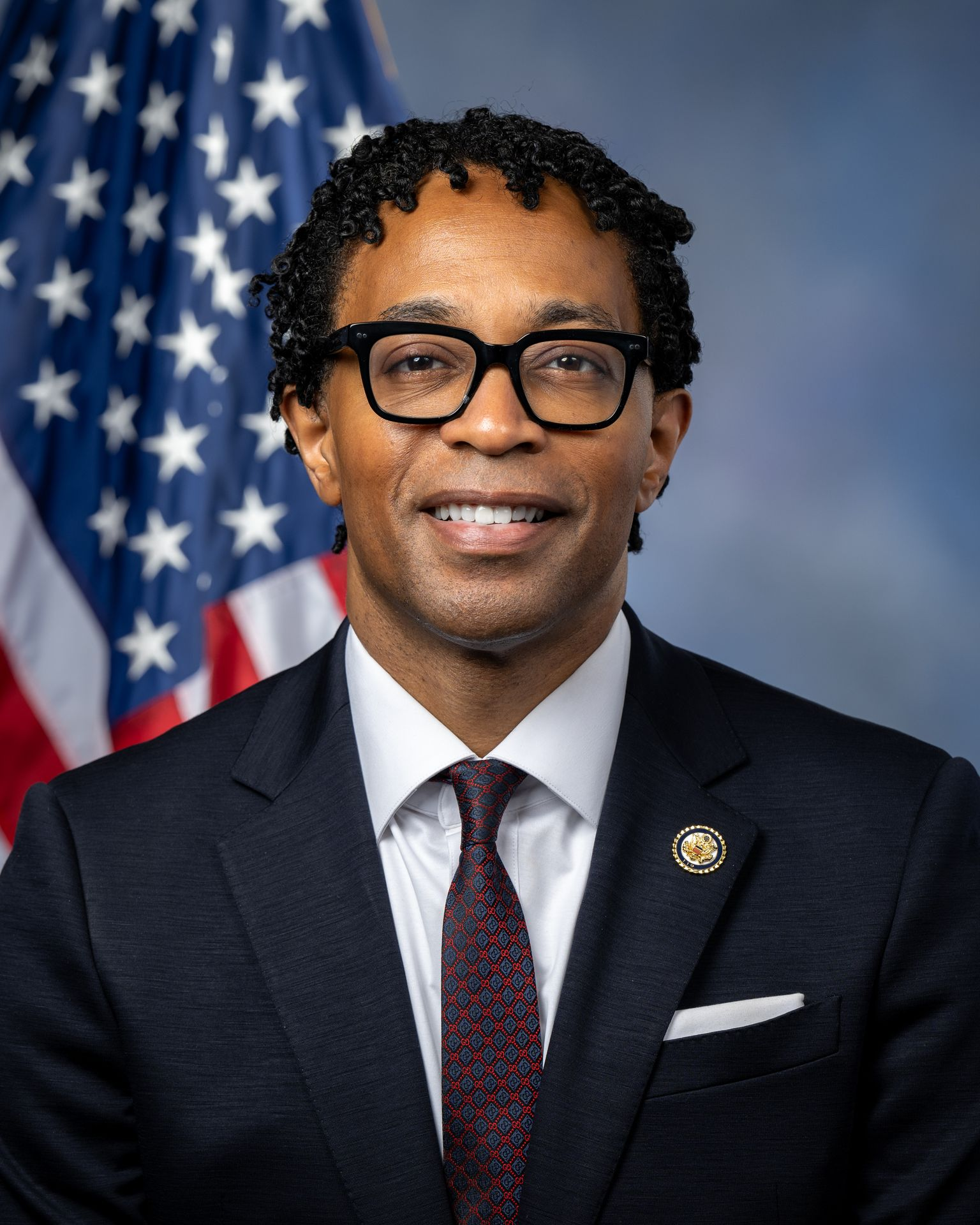
- Official portrait, 2025

Member of the U.S. House of Representatives from Missouri's 1st district
- Incumbent
- Assumed office January 3, 2025
- Preceded by: Cori Bush

Prosecuting Attorney of St. Louis County
- In office January 1, 2019 – January 3, 2025
- Preceded by: Bob McCulloch
- Succeeded by: Melissa Price Smith

Personal details
- Born: Wesley Jonell-Cleavon Bell; November 5, 1974 (age 52) St. Louis County, Missouri, U.S.
- Party: Democratic
- Education: Lindenwood University (BA); University of Missouri (JD)
- Website: House website Campaign website

Wesley Jonell-Cleavon Bell (born November 5, 1974) is an American attorney and politician serving as the U.S. representative for Missouri's 1st congressional district, based in St. Louis, since 2025. A member of the Democratic Party, he previously served as prosecuting attorney for St. Louis County, Missouri, from 2019 to 2025.

Bell was first elected prosecuting attorney in 2018 after defeating long-time yet controversial county prosecutor Bob McCulloch in the August 2018 Democratic primary election. He is the first African-American prosecuting attorney in St. Louis County history.

In 2024, Bell ran against and defeated incumbent Democrat Cori Bush in the primary, supported by heavy spending from pro-Israel lobbying group AIPAC. In 2026, he defeated Bush by 22 points in a primary rematch.

== Early life and education ==
Wesley Jonell-Cleavon Bell was born on November 5, 1974, and raised in northern St. Louis County, Missouri. He is the son of a police officer father and civil servant mother. Bell is a graduate of Hazelwood East High School, Lindenwood University, and University of Missouri School of Law.

== Early career ==
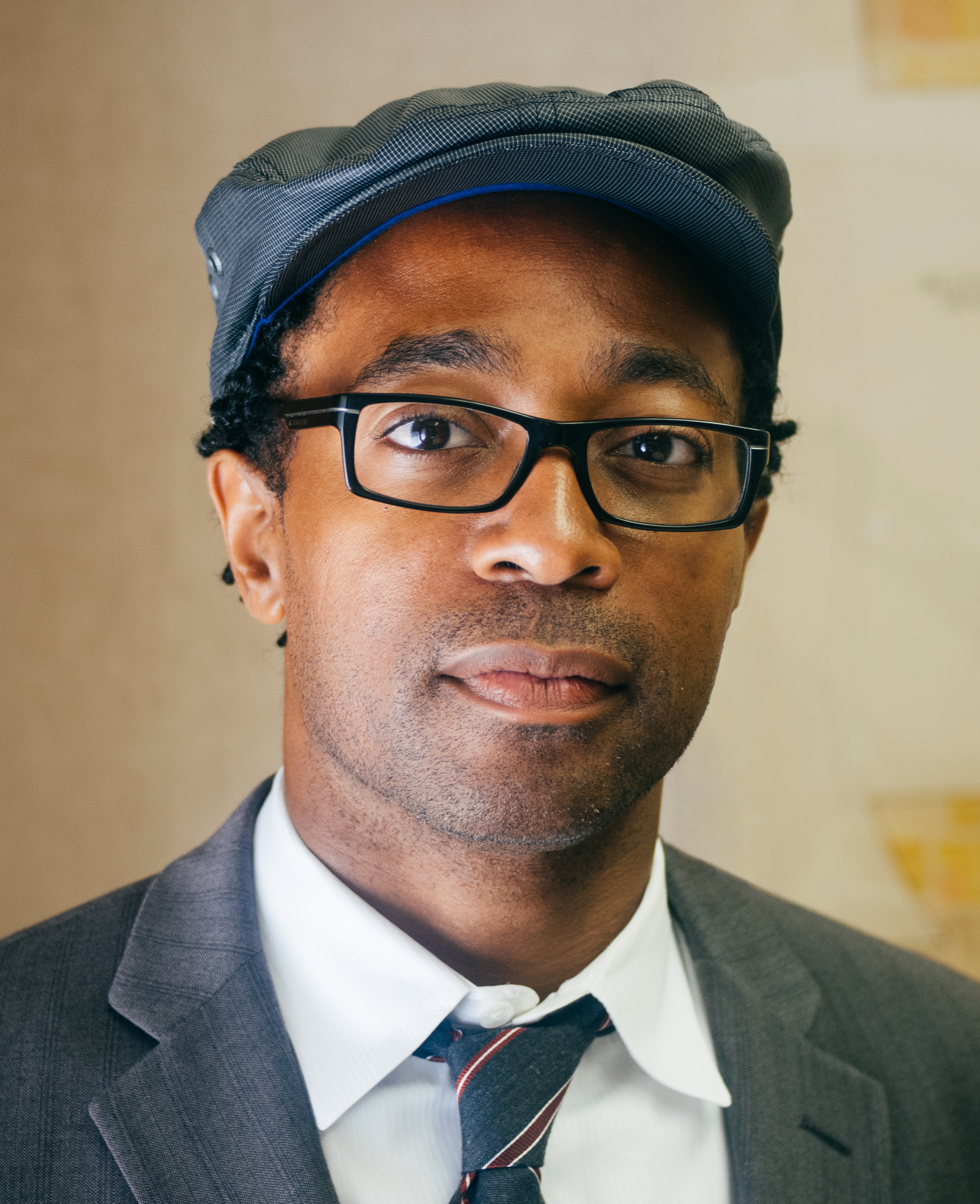
Bell in 2014

After graduating from law school, Bell worked as a St. Louis County public defender. He later joined the faculty of Florissant Valley Community College as a professor in the criminology department. Additionally, he also was appointed to be a municipal court judge in Velda City and municipal prosecutor in Riverview. While working as a municipal judge in Velda City, Bell was sued by Arch City Defenders, a local nonprofit, for his role in Velda City's cash bail system.

In 2006, Bell managed the campaign of Mark J. Byrne, a conservative Republican candidate challenging Lacy Clay's seat in Missouri's 1st congressional district. Byrne described Bell's participation in the campaign as a "friendly favor," saying that Bell did his best to help Byrne win despite their different political views. The district was considered a safe seat for Democrats by the Cook Political Report and the incumbent Democrat won with over 72% of the vote.

In 2015, following the Ferguson Protests, Bell was elected to Ferguson city council, beating out Lee Smith, a first time candidate popular among Ferguson protestors.

In 2018, Bell entered the race for county prosecutor. He ran on a platform of community based policing, assigning special prosecutors in homicides by police, pledging to never seek the death penalty, reforming cash bail/bond, and other progressive points. He received significant support from local and national activists and advocacy groups. The election was also seen as a referendum on incumbent Bob McCulloch, for his decision not to prosecute the white police officer who shot and killed Michael Brown.

=== County prosecutor ===
In his first hours in office, Bell ordered his assistant prosecutors not to prosecute marijuana cases under 100 grams without evidence of distribution of the drug; however, he still prosecuted marijuana cases where the person possessing the marijuana is armed with a weapon. His office stopped seeking warrants on cases that solely involve the possession of marijuana. Additionally, during his first days in office Bell elected to stop prosecuting criminal child support cases.

Bell was confronted in 2020 with a case from 2018, in which a resident of Jefferson County, Missouri, killed a woman. There was a major public outcry for Bell to seek the death penalty for accused killer Thomas Bruce, but Bell refused, keeping his campaign promise. Former St. Louis police chief Tim Fitch urged Bell to turn the case over to federal prosecutors so that they could seek the death penalty. However, the family of the victim supported Bell's decision not to seek the death penalty.

In early 2020, Bell reopened the investigation into the killing of Michael Brown in 2014. Bell ultimately concluded, as had his predecessor Bob McCulloch and the United States Department of Justice, that there was not probable cause to file criminal charges against police officer Darren Wilson in the shooting. The decision was met with anger from Michael Brown's family who accused Bell of conducting an incomplete investigation. In response to these accusations, Bell stated that his department "relied heavily on the evidence uncovered by the Department of Justice, an investigation that was extraordinarily comprehensive and included interviews of every significant witness and its own forensic examinations."

In 2024, Bell asked to vacate the murder conviction of Marcellus Williams on the basis of “clear and convincing evidence” of Williams's innocence. Williams was previously scheduled for execution in 2017, spared by a last minute stay by Eric Greitens, who appointed a board of inquiry later dissolved by Mike Parson.

Following the 10-year commemoration of the killing of Michael Brown in August 2024, Bell pressed felony charges on at least eight protestors in Ferguson. A police officer suffered brain injuries following a fall, however protest organizers say that the incident was not caused by the activist charged with assault.

In October 2024, the population of people incarcerated in St. Louis County jail was more than double than in 2022. Bell told a crime commission meeting that they were still working on backlog from COVID-19 and that judges were tired of seeing the same people come into courts.

In late 2024, Bell accused a county councilman of nepotism due to his step-daughter's temporary position as clerk. Documentation was provided to show that she had not received payment, however Bell further accused her of falsifying documents in a felony charge of forgery. In 2025, the incoming prosecutor dismissed the charges.

==== Gender discrimination lawsuit ====
On October 29, 2020, Susan Petersen, one of Bell's assistant prosecutors, filed a lawsuit under Missouri's Human Rights Act claiming that Bell had fired her and forced out five other female attorneys in favor of male employees. The lawsuit further alleged that Bell had created a hostile work environment for female attorneys at the office. Bell responded by claiming that the prosecutor's attorney was irresponsibly and unethically attempting to litigate her case in the media.

On June 27, 2024, circuit Judge Bruce F. Hilton ruled that Bell would have to answer deposition questions about sexual relations occurring between a supervisor and multiple subordinates in Bell’s office and denied the county’s motion to delay the Petersen trial. The jury trial was rescheduled for January 27, 2025.

On January 24, 2025, a settlement was reached in the case, with St. Louis County agreeing to pay Petersen $500,000.

==== Use of government resources ====
Bell was criticized for his use of government resources while in office. In June 2019, KSDK, a local news outlet, reported that Bell had amassed nearly $800 in parking tickets though he was provided with a parking space. In response, Bell's Chief of Staff informed the public that Bell and other staff members needed their cars adjacent to the office and not parked in the sectioned-off parking spaces—over one block away—because Bell, as a prosecuting attorney, needed both him and his agents to have immediate access to their cars in order to best secure justice for the county of which he was responsible. This Chief of Staff further advised that, for Bell and other employees, they could expect up to seven calls a day that would require them to travel to their car, and each of those seven calls would waste taxpayer dollars if they were to park further away from their office. Bell later paid off the parking tickets using his own money.

In October 2019, the St. Louis Post-Dispatch conducted an investigation into Bell's expenditures during the first ten months in office. The investigation uncovered that Bell had spent over $30,000 in government funds on travel and food during his first ten months in office. This included an $816 dinner at an expensive Miami steakhouse and a $300 meal at a Lake of the Ozarks steakhouse. In response, Bell informed the Dispatch that he repaid the Miami dinner immediately and refused to charge his office for any additional expenditures. Bell did not comment on the Ozarks meal directly, but informed the Post-Dispatch that, while he needed to get in the good graces of local law enforcement to perform his duties as prosecutor, Bell recognizes that the meal wasn't a common expense during the previous prosecutor's long tenure. However, Bell noted that he had to simultaneously work with the police and hold them to a higher standard, justifying the expense. Furthermore, the Post-Dispatch also reported on Bell's efforts to hide details of his spending, such as omitting thousands of dollars of charges from requested records, charging the Post to provide requested documents, reimbursing expenditures only after records requests for those expenditures were made, and being nonresponsive to sunshine requests. Under pressure from his supporters, Bell ultimately apologized citing the actions as "missteps" and vowed to spend taxpayer money more appropriately in the future.

== U.S. House of Representatives ==
=== Elections ===
==== 2024 ====
In 2023, Bell announced a challenge to Josh Hawley for the U.S. Senate, in which he polled higher than fellow Democratic candidate Lucas Kunce. In late October 2023, he dropped out from the Senate race to challenge fellow Democrat Cori Bush for Missouri's 1st congressional district seat. Leaked audio confirmed that Bell previously told Bush he would not run against her. Bell told Bush, "I'm telling you on my word I am not running against you."

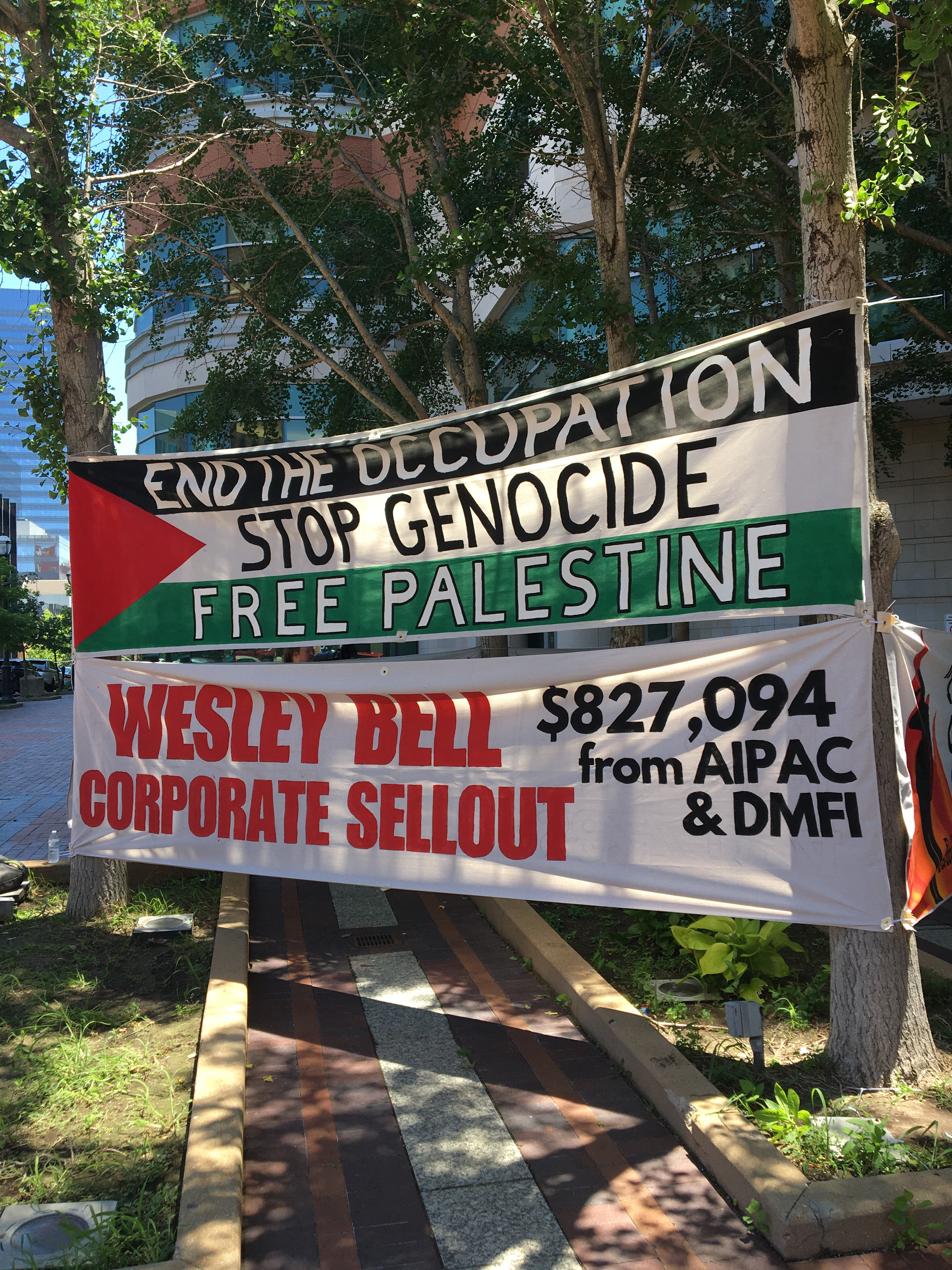
Bell's support from AIPAC and DMFI were prominent in the 2024 election campaign.

The American Israel Public Affairs Committee (AIPAC), a pro-Israel lobbying group, spent $8.5 million on Bell's campaign. Campaign ads were funded by AIPAC's spending arm, United Democracy Project. By May 2024, Bell had raised more than $65,000 from donors who also gave to one of Missouri’s two Republican senators, Hawley and Eric Schmitt, in their most recent campaigns, and Missouri Secretary of State Jay Ashcroft, the leading Republican candidate for governor. Bell also received additional support and campaign financing from conservatives and Republicans. In addition, the Democratic Majority for Israel spent large amounts of money to support his campaign and defeat Bush.

On July 25, 2024, the St. Louis Post-Dispatch, which had previously been critical of Bell, endorsed him. Bell defeated Bush in the primary and ultimately won the general election.

==== 2026 ====
Bell is running for re-election in 2026. He won the Democratic primary on August 4, 2026 in a rematch against Cori Bush, winning with 59% of the vote, a greater margin of victory than 2024. Bell's campaign outspent Bush by a 27-to-1 ratio, and AIPAC spent $3.1 million to support him. Bell was also backed by House Democratic party leadership and the Congressional Black Caucus. He will face Republican nominee Paul Berry and Libertarian nominee Tom Schmitz in the general election.

=== Tenure ===
Bell visited St. Louis following the 2025 St. Louis tornado. He said the storm disaster presented an opportunity to invest in under-served areas, and that he was prepared to file for additional aid if requests were not matched.

In May 2025, Bell criticized cuts to Medicaid.

In June 2025, Bell collaborated with Senator Eric Schmitt to make a custom beer in the Anheuser-Busch Brew Across America competition.

During the June 2025 Los Angeles protests, Bell joined 74 other House Democrats in signing a resolution condemning antisemitism and the 2025 Boulder fire attack which included an expression of "gratitude" for ICE. Another resolution on antisemitism circulated at the same time with broader support.

In August 2025, Bell visited St. Louis for constituent gatherings, including a job fair and public town hall. The town hall was disrupted by protesters criticizing his support for Israel in the Gaza war. Security guards were recorded treating attendees roughly, with SLMPD distancing themselves from many of the guards and one guard put on leave from his civilian role.

In September 2025, Bell joined the discharge petition filed by Thomas Massie to demand the release of the Epstein files.

=== Committee assignments ===
For the 119th Congress:

- Committee on Armed Services
  - Subcommittee on Strategic Forces
  - Subcommittee on Tactical Air and Land Forces
- Committee on Oversight and Government Reform
  - Subcommittee on Federal Law Enforcement
  - Subcommittee on Health Care and Financial Services

=== Caucus memberships ===
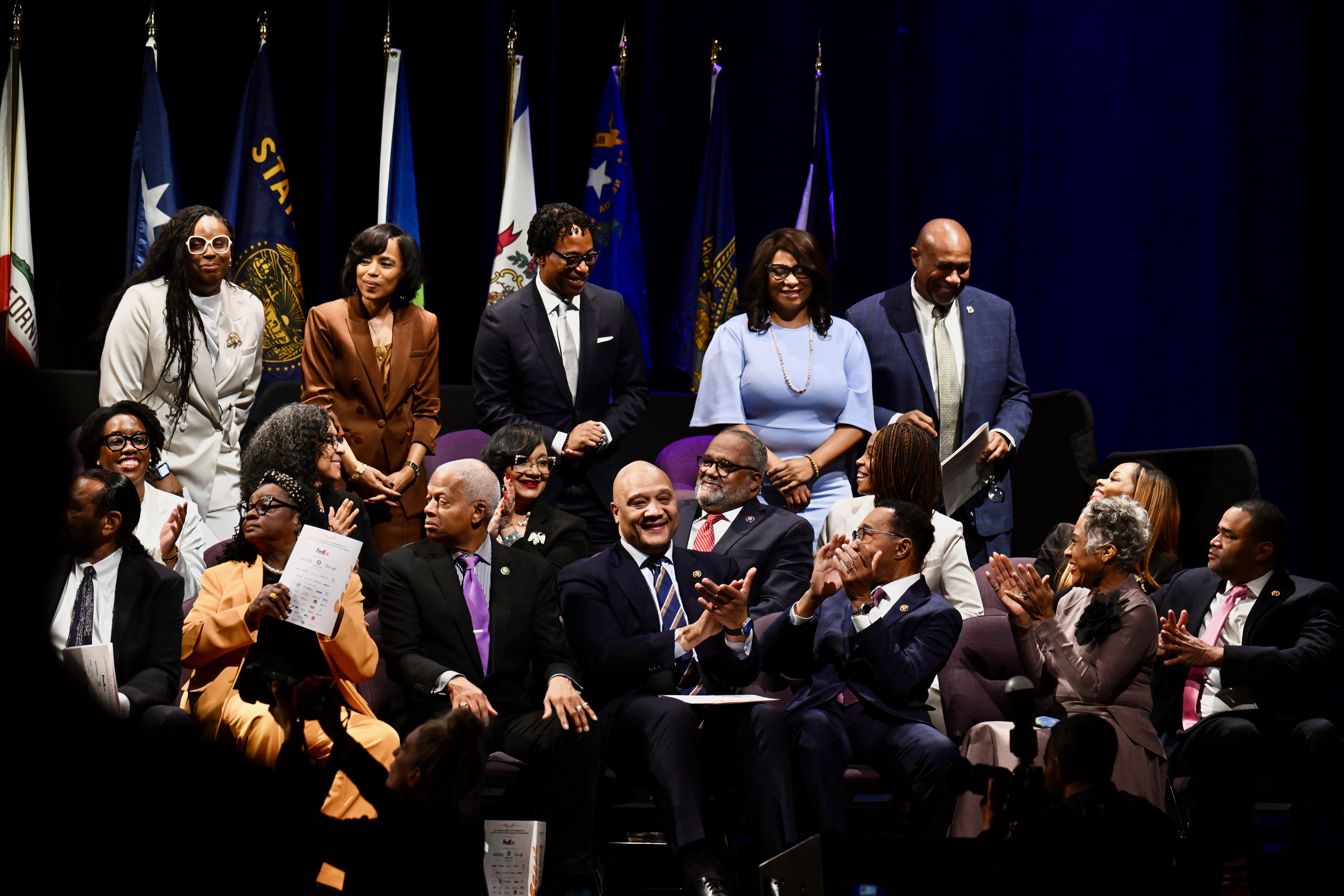
Swearing-In of the 119th Congressional Black Caucus, January 3, 2025

- Black Maternal Health Caucus
- New Democrat Coalition

== Political positions ==
=== Israel ===
Bell is a supporter of Israel. He voiced support for Israel in the Twelve-Day War.

In July 2025, Bell condemned the starvation of Palestinian civilians caused by Israel's blockade of the Gaza Strip, saying: "I've always supported Israel's right to exist and defend itself. That hasn't changed. But supporting this government's actions – allowing children to starve and firing on civilians seeking food – is something I can't stand by. This isn't self-defense. It must stop."

In August 2025, Bell met with Israeli president Isaac Herzog as part of a congressional delegation to Israel with the American Israel Education Foundation.

In July 2026, Bell voted against an amendment to cut off aid to Israel.

== Electoral history ==
=== St. Louis County Prosecuting Attorney ===
2018 St. Louis County Prosecuting Attorney election
Primary election
Party	Candidate	Votes	%
Democratic	Wesley Bell	103,605	56.56
Democratic	Robert McCulloch (incumbent)	79,565	43.44
Total votes		183,170	100.00
General election
Democratic	Wesley Bell	317,172	91.30
Write-in		30,242	8.70
Total votes		347,414	100.00
Democratic hold			

2022 St. Louis County Prosecuting Attorney election
Party	Candidate	Votes	%
Democratic	Wesley Bell (incumbent)	235,208	70.69
Libertarian	Theo Brown	97,544	29.31
Total votes		332,752	100.00
Democratic hold			

=== US House ===
US House election, 2024: Missouri District 1
Primary election
Party	Candidate	Votes	%
Democratic	Wesley Bell	63,521	51.12
Democratic	Cori Bush (incumbent)	56,723	45.65
Democratic	Maria Chappelle-Nadal	3,279	2.64
Democratic	Ron Harshaw	735	0.59
Total votes		124,258	100.00
General election
Democratic	Wesley Bell	233,312	75.93
Republican	Andrew Jones	56,453	18.37
Libertarian	Rochelle Riggins	10,070	3.28
Green	Don Fitz	5,151	1.68
Better Party	Blake Ashby	2,279	0.74
Total votes		307,265	100.00
Democratic hold			

US House election, 2026: Missouri District 1
Primary election
Party	Candidate	Votes	%
Democratic	Wesley Bell (incumbent)	83,853	59.17
Democratic	Cori Bush	52,299	36.91
Democratic	Alissa Murphy	3,261	2.30
Democratic	Carl E. Harris Sr.	1,570	1.11
Democratic	Carl Earnest Henderson	728	0.51
Total votes		141,711	100.00

== See also ==
- List of new members of the 119th United States Congress

U.S. House of Representatives
Preceded by Cori Bush	Member of the U.S. House of Representatives from Missouri's 1st congressional district 2025–present	Incumbent
U.S. order of precedence (ceremonial)
Preceded by Nick Begich III	United States representatives by seniority 368th	Succeeded by Sheri Biggs
