= Michael Brown (Missouri politician) =

American politician

Member of the Missouri House of Representatives from the 50th district
- In office 2005–2013
- Succeeded by: Caleb Jones

Personal details
- Party: Democratic

Michael R. Brown is an American politician. He was member of the Missouri House of Representatives for the 50th district.
