= Sara Walsh (politician) =

American politician

Member of the Missouri House of Representatives from the 50th district
- In office April 2017 – January 2023
- Preceded by: Caleb Jones
- Succeeded by: Douglas Mann

Personal details
- Born: Torrance, California, U.S.
- Party: Republican
- Spouse: Steve Walsh (m. 2012; died 2021)
- Education: Columbia College (BBA); University of Missouri (MPA)

Sara Walsh is an American politician who served as a member of the Missouri House of Representatives, representing the 50th district from 2017 to 2023.

== Early life and education ==
Walsh was born in Torrance, California, and moved to Ashland, Missouri, in 1986. She earned a Bachelor of Business Administration from Columbia College and a Master of Public Affairs from the Truman School of Public Affairs of the University of Missouri.

== Personal life ==
In 2012, Walsh married Steve Walsh, a former journalist who became press secretary to Congresswoman Vicky Hartzler.

On August 5, 2021, Walsh announced that both she and her husband had COVID-19 and had chosen to not be vaccinated against it. On August 19, Steve Walsh died at the age of 63 of COVID-19.

== Career ==
In 2005, Walsh worked as a legislative assistant in the Missouri House of Representatives. From 2004 to 2014, she was a programs and outreach manager for the National Newspaper Association. In 2014 and 2015, she was a staff auditor in the office of the state auditor of Missouri. From 2015 to 2017, she was a member services coordinator for the Missouri Pharmacy Association.

=== Missouri House of Representatives ===
Walsh was elected to the House in April 2017 to replace Caleb Jones, who resigned to take on the job as deputy chief of staff to Missouri Governor Eric Greitens. She is a member of the Republican Party. Starting in 2021, she served as the Republican majority caucus chair.

Walsh also served as chair of the House Consent and Procedure Committee.

Walsh supports anti-abortion legislation and supported a proposal that would remove Medicaid funding from Planned Parenthood in Missouri.

=== 2022 congressional election ===
On July 7, 2021, Walsh announced her candidacy for Missouri's 4th congressional district in the 2022 election. On May 16, 2022, Walsh dropped out of the Republican primary, citing new district maps that placed much of her State House district outside the 4th District.
