= Rory Ellinger =

American lawyer and politician

Member of the Missouri House of Representatives from the 86th district
- In office 2011 – April 9, 2014
- Preceded by: Cole McNary
- Succeeded by: Joe Adams

Personal details
- Born: June 13, 1941 St. Louis, Missouri, U.S.
- Died: April 9, 2014 (aged 72) University City, Missouri
- Party: Democratic
- Spouse: Linda Locke
- Children: Maggie Ellinger-Locke; Martin Ellinger
- Education: University of Missouri–Kansas City (B.A., 1963); University of Missouri (M.A.); University of Missouri–Kansas City (J.D.)
- Profession: Attorney

Rory Vincent Ellinger (June 13, 1941 – April 9, 2014) was an American lawyer and politician. Ellinger was born in St. Louis, Missouri. He served as the Representative for Pagedale, University City, and Wellston in St. Louis County (District 86) in the Missouri House of Representatives. He was elected to his first two-year term in November 2010 on the Democratic Party ticket.

== Early life ==
Ellinger was born in St. Louis to Russell Ellinger, president of Ellinger Store Equipment, and Lois Kelley Ellinger. He was raised in a liberal Catholic household where Lois was a longtime Republican committeewoman. Ellinger grew up in Webster Groves and graduated from Bishop DuBourg High School. While working as a checker at Kroger in the late 1950s when he was a DuBourg student, Ellinger over lunch break became enamored by picketing over hiring practices at a nearby Woolworth’s. He joined the NAACP protest and began a long career as a civil rights and peace activist. Both of his parents died when he was 24. Ellinger was born June 1941; his father died in 1967; his mother 1968.

== Activism and legal career ==
In the 1960s, Ellinger was a staffer for Young Christian Students movement, a progressive Catholic group in Chicago that worked with Martin Luther King Jr. He organized peace and civil rights groups in Boston and Cleveland, working with the Student Nonviolent Coordinating Committee (SNCC) and the Congress of Racial Equality (CORE). He was arrested and jailed in Chicago and Boston, and in 1965 with Dr. King, in Alabama during the Selma to Montgomery marches.

He briefly was a bodyguard to Dr. King in 1966 before returning to grad school at the University of Missouri (Mizzou) where he was chapter president of the Students for a Democratic Society (SDS) and earned a Master of Arts in history. He had received a Bachelor of Arts in history from University of Missouri–Kansas City (UMKC) in 1963 and later his Juris Doctor from UMKC.

Ellinger was founder of Ellinger & Associates, P.C., a general practice firm located in O'Fallon, Missouri in St. Charles County. He was a member of The Missouri Bar and was a treasurer and secretary of the St. Charles County Bar Association. Ellinger successfully argued in front of the Missouri Court of Appeals, the Supreme Court of Missouri, and the Eighth U. S. Circuit Court of Appeals.

He was a member of the St. Louis Urban League and The Ethical Society of St. Louis.

Ellinger was elected to the University City School Board in 1991 and served for twelve years, ten of those in leadership positions.

== Personal life ==
In 1980 Ellinger married Linda Locke, a business leader and president of Reputaré Consulting. He had two children, Maggie Ellinger-Locke and Martin Ellinger. Maggie is a 2011 graduate of City University of New York School of Law and is a criminal defense attorney based in St. Louis. She received her Bachelor of Arts in ecofeminism from Antioch College in 2005. A member of the National Lawyers Guild (NLG), she is notable for her legal support to the Occupy St. Louis movement, as well as her involvement with many other progressive causes, particularly in support of the Black Lives Matter movement. Martin is a former Peace Corps volunteer and is currently working for James Hardie Building Products as a transportation analyst.

He died in office on April 9, 2014, aged 72. He had a rare and aggressive form of liver cancer.

== Legislative record ==
Ellinger became known as the most liberal legislator in Missouri. He and Jill Schupp (D-88) introduced House Bill 545, banning the possession, sale, transfer or manufacture of certain semi-automatic rifles and magazines that are capable of holding more than ten rounds as well as calling for confiscation or destruction of existing firearms within 90 days and would provide no compensation for the confiscated firearms. Part of the backlash to this bill, which was never passed, included a bill sponsored by Mike Leara (R-96) that would make it a Class D felony for any legislator to introduce legislation that restricts or limits gun rights.
