= John D. Schneider =

American lawyer and politician (1937–2017)

Member of the Missouri Senate from the 14th district
- In office 1971–2002
- Succeeded by: Rita Heard Days

Member of the Missouri House of Representatives from the 26th district
- In office 1969–1970

Personal details
- Born: March 1, 1937 St. Louis, Missouri
- Died: March 2, 2017 (aged 80) Warson Woods, Missouri
- Party: Democratic

John D. Schneider (March 1, 1937 – March 2, 2017) was an American lawyer and politician.

He was elected to the Missouri House of Representatives in 1968, and served until 1970, when he ran for a seat on the Missouri State Senate. Schneider stepped down at the end of his term in 2002 and returned to his private law practice.

Born in St. Louis, Missouri, Schneider received his bachelor's and law degrees from Saint Louis University. He was married to Mary Schneider, with whom he had four children. He died at his home in Warson Woods, Missouri on March 2, 2017, at the age of 80.
