= Rita Heard Days =

American politician (born 1950)

Chair of the St. Louis County Council from the 1st district
- Incumbent
- Assumed office 2019
- Preceded by: Hazel Erby

Member of the Missouri Senate from the 14th district
- In office 2003–2011
- Preceded by: John D. Schneider
- Succeeded by: Maria Chappelle-Nadal

Member of the Missouri House of Representatives from the 71st district
- In office 1993–2001

Personal details
- Born: October 16, 1950 (age 75) Minden, Louisiana, U.S.
- Party: Democratic
- Education: Lincoln University

Rita Heard Days (born October 16, 1950) is a Democratic politician from St. Louis, Missouri. She served in the Missouri House of Representatives from 1993 to 2000, and was a member of the Missouri Senate from 2003 to 2011. In 2019 she was elected to the St. Louis County Council representing the first district.

== Political career ==
With an open House seat for the 71st District in Missouri, Sen. Days ran for the position and was elected as a representative for the district in a special election in November 1993. Three years later, Sen. Days was elected by her peers as House Majority Whip and retained that position for the remainder of her time in the Missouri House of Representatives.

During her time in the House, Sen. Days sponsored and co-sponsored legislation that addressed osteoporosis (1995), elections (1996), early childhood education (1997), bonds for sewer improvement (1997), education reform (1998), creating the Neighborhood Preservation Pilot Program (1999), and enacting the Missouri Universal Health Assurance Program (2000).

Senator Days was elected to the Missouri Senate in 2002 where she currently serves on more than 10 committees, commissions, and councils. In her years in the Senate, she has drafted legislation addressing discrimination (2003), early childhood special education (2004), property taxes (2005), advanced voting systems for elections (2006), children’s mental health (2007), and ballot requirements for elections (2008).

Some of Sen. Days’ legislative accomplishments include serving on the Commission on the Future of Higher Education, Joint Commission for Court Automation, Southern Legislative Conference Education Committee, Re-appointment Task Force Committee on the Assembly on State Issues of the National Conference of State Legislatures, Election Task Force, and the Council of State Government. As a senator, she served on the following committees:

- Education
- Governmental Accountability and Fiscal Oversight
- Small Business, Insurance and Industry
- Transportation
- Select Committee on Oversight of Federal Stimulus, Vice-Chairman
- Joint Committee (both House and Senate) on Education
- Joint Committee on Government Accountability
- Joint Committee on Public Employee Retirement
- Joint Committee on Transportation Oversight

In 2010, she was succeeded in the Senate by fellow Democrat Maria Chappelle-Nadal.
