= Sharon Pace =

American politician (born 1943)

Member of the Missouri House of Representatives from the 74th district
- In office 2009–2016

Personal details
- Born: November 20, 1943 (age 82) St. Louis, Missouri, U.S.
- Party: Democratic
- Children: 3
- Profession: Administrator

Sharon L. Pace (born November 20, 1943) is an American politician. She was a member of the Missouri House of Representatives, having served from 2009 to 2016. She is a member of the Democratic Party. She has served as the mayor of Northwoods since April 27, 2021.

== Electoral history ==
=== State representative ===
Missouri House of Representatives Primary Election, August 5, 2008, District 70
Party	Candidate	Votes	%	±%
Democratic	Sharon L. Pace	1,071	55.15%	
Democratic	Jack Chase	871	44.85%	

Missouri House of Representatives Election, November 4, 2008, District 70
Party	Candidate	Votes	%	±%
Democratic	Sharon L. Pace	14,498%	100.00%	

Missouri House of Representatives Election, November 2, 2010, District 70
Party	Candidate	Votes	%	±%
Democratic	Sharon L. Pace	8,287	100.00%	

Missouri House of Representatives Primary Election, August 7, 2012, District 74
Party	Candidate	Votes	%	±%
Democratic	Sharon L. Pace	2,511	69.27%	
Democratic	C.M. Spreng	1,114	30.73%	

Missouri House of Representatives Election, November 6, 2012, District 74
Party	Candidate	Votes	%	±%
Democratic	Sharon L. Pace	14,356	100.00%	

Missouri House of Representatives Primary Election, August 5, 2014, District 74
Party	Candidate	Votes	%	±%
Democratic	Sharon L. Pace	2,781	78.49%	+9.22
Democratic	Don Houston	762	21.51%	

Missouri House of Representatives Election, November 4, 2014, District 74
Party	Candidate	Votes	%	±%
Democratic	Sharon L. Pace	6,756	100.00%	

=== State Senate ===
Missouri Senate Primary Election, August 7, 2018, District 14
Party	Candidate	Votes	%	±%
Democratic	Brian Williams	12,615	40.19%	
Democratic	Sharon L. Pace	11,782	37.53%	
Democratic	Joe Adams	6,993	22.28%	
