= LJ Punch =

American trauma surgeon

- Born: Washington, D.C.
- Education: Yale University; University of Connecticut
- Known for: Advocating against violence, founding Power4STL
- Awards: 2019 “Humanism in Medicine award” - Distinguished Service Teaching Award, 2019 Gerry and Bob Virgil Ethic of Service Award, 2018-2020 Jerome T. Loeb Teaching Fellowship
- Scientific career
- Fields: Trauma surgery
- Workplaces: Washington University in St. Louis

LJ Punch is an American critical care surgeon, an associate professor of surgery, and a scholar within the Institute for Public Health at Washington University School of Medicine. Punch is also an activist in the fight against gun violence and directs StopTheBleedSTL, located at "The T" anti-violence center in St. Louis, which runs programs to educate the community on how to reduce the impact of trauma, injury, and violence in St. Louis. As a physician, educator, and activist, Punch aims to propagate the idea of “Radical Generosity” as means to better his community and the lives of those around him.

== Early life and education ==
Punch was born in Washington, D.C. and grew up in Wellsville, Ohio with his grandmother and mother. From a young age, Punch loved music. Punch would attend piano lessons, for a mere $2, at the house of a woman in his community named Mrs. Carter. Mrs. Carter taught Punch that the best way to help someone is to “give them something to give”. So, in return for piano lesson, Punch served food to community members that entered Mrs. Carter's house. Further, Mrs Carter exposed Punch to the idea of “radical generosity”, sharing knowledge and resources to better the lives and the overall well-being of the community.

Punch left his small town of Wellsville to attend college at Yale University. After earning his undergraduate degree at Yale, Punch began his medical training in 1998 at the University of Connecticut School of Medicine. It was in medical school that Punch experienced poverty and trauma in patients of his own and started to gain interest in the idea of going into trauma surgery as a specialty.

After graduating from medical school in 2002, Punch continued in medicine, pursuing his residency training in General Surgery at the University of Maryland Medical Center in Baltimore. Punch completed his residency in 2007 and, motivated by his experiences in Maryland, pursued a Surgical Critical Care Fellowship at the R. Adams Cowley Shock Trauma Center in Maryland from 2008 to 2009.

== Career and advocacy ==
After an intense residency in Baltimore, Punch moved to Texas to work in general surgery at Houston Methodist Hospital. After a few years training in Texas, Punch was recruited to Washington University School of Medicine in St. Louis and, in 2016, Punch joined the Department of Surgery at Barnes-Jewish Hospital at Washington University School of Medicine. Punch's career at Washington University in St. Louis has since been centered around performing trauma surgery as well promoting equity within his community and educating the St. Louis community on gun violence. At Washington University School of Medicine, Punch is as an associate professor at the medical school as well as a Scholar in the Institute for Public Health. Punch educates students at the undergraduate and graduate level on gun violence as well as the entire spectrum of illness and healing associated with violent crime. As a trauma surgeon, Punch cares for victims of gun violence and helps to support and educate their families.

After moving to St. Louis, Punch started the non-profit StopTheBleedSTL, an initiative that promotes collaboration between professionals, students, and community members to raise awareness about and address trauma, injury, and violence in the community. As the Director of StopTheBleedSTL, Punch has implemented trainings and curricula inspired by the national “Stop the Bleed” initiative which aims to educate the community and empower them with the skills and knowledge to address gun violence in their communities. StopTheBleedSTL hosts trainings, classes, and events for the community at "The T" which is the anti-violence center on Delmar Boulevard in St. Louis that Punch started to create a safe and supportive environment with which to gather community members. One of the classes that is run at "The T" involves teaching people the three quick actions they can take to stop bleeding in victims of violence to potentially save a life. Since someone can bleed out in 1 minute, while an ambulance can take 15 mins to arrive, empowering community members with the skills and knowledge to stop severe bleeds is essential to saving lives in the community and making sure that people in the community are not victims or bystanders, but active participants in the situation at hand. Punch even started a “StopTheBleed Junior” where he teaches young people in his community how to provide basic first aid trauma. One statistic that Punch uses in his training program is that 20% of trauma deaths are preventable, and bleeding is the number one cause of those deaths. This fact emphasizes the importance of his community education. Punch has taught over 7000 people in his community, regardless of their background or medical experience, how to play an active role in saving a victim of gun violence.

In 2018, Punch was awarded the Loeb Teaching Fellowship to fund his design of a new curriculum centered around exploring “the anatomy of gun violence” as a public health issue. Punch also created a community engagement curriculum for the 2020 entering MD and MD-PhD student classes at Washington University School of Medicine that focuses on community advocacy and engagement throughout the entire four years of medical school such that students can stay longitudinally engaged in improving the community.

In 2019, Punch brought his message to Washington, DC before the House Ways and Means Oversight committee. He emphasized in his message that violence is a public health issue and it not only causes bullet wounds, but lasting wounds in the lives of families and communities associated with gunshot victims. Punch also made sure to reiterate that healing can be contagious, and that a community educated on how to heal victims of violence and how to prevent violence can propagate through a community and positively shape public health outcomes when it comes to violence.

Near the end of 2019, Punch was appointed to the St. Louis County Police Board becoming one of the first African American Non-binary person to serve on the board. In addition, Punch was a Governing Board Proxy of St. Louis integrated health network.

=== COVID-19 outbreak advocacy ===
During the COVID-19 pandemic, Punch and his team at StopTheBleedSTL have collaborated with PrepareSTL to educate the community about the pandemic and provide them with the knowledge to keep themselves and their communities safe. Punch also raised awareness in St. Louis about the overwhelming majority of patients on ventilators that were black or brown. Punch reported that there were 3x as many COVID cases in historically black neighbourhoods of St. Louis compared to historically white areas of St. Louis. Again, during the time of pandemic, Punch calls for education outreach to stop the virus, screen more people, and better the lives of disadvantaged communities by involving the community in public health awareness initiatives.

== Media ==
- 2020 Featured in Fox News "Trauma Surgeon Seeks to Save Lives with Stop the Bleed Classes"
- 2019 TEDxGateway ArchSalon “How Bullets Go Deep”
- 2019 Featured in NPR “Trauma Surgeon Battles Bullets in the Operating Room and the Community”
- 2019 Featured in “Race, Violence, and Medicine - Gun Violence (Pt. 3) - "Purpose over Position” Podcast
- 2018 Featured in "St. Louis trauma surgeon taking his lifesaving work outside the hospital"Trauma Surgeon Teaching How"

== Awards and honors ==
- 2019 “Humanism in Medicine award” - Distinguished Service Teaching Award
- 2019 Gerry and Bob Virgil Ethic of Service Award
- 2018-2020 Jerome T. Loeb Teaching Fellowship

== Publications ==
- Dicker, R. A., & Punch, L. J. (2020). Long-term Consequences in Trauma: At the Center of the Public Health Approach Is the Survivor's Voice. JAMA surgery, 155(1), 59–60. https://doi.org/10.1001/jamasurg.2019.4560
- Kim, P. J., Attinger, C. E., Constantine, T., Crist, B. D., Faust, E., Hirche, C. R., Lavery, L. A., Messina, V. J., Ohura, N., Punch, L. J., Wirth, G. A., Younis, I., & Téot, L. (2020). Negative pressure wound therapy with instillation: International consensus guidelines update. International Wound Journal, 17(1), 174–186. https://doi.org/10.1111/iwj.13254
- Andrade, E. G., Hayes, J. M., & Punch, L. J. (2019). Enhancement of Bleeding Control 1.0 to Reach Communities at High Risk for Urban Gun Violence: Acute Bleeding Control. JAMA surgery, 154(6), 549–550.
- Andrade, E. G., Hayes, J. M., & Punch, L. J. (Accepted/In press). Stop the bleed: The impact of trauma first aid kits on post-training confidence among community members and medical professionals. American journal of surgery.
- Punch, L. J., Self, D. W., Nestler, E. J., & Taylor, J. R. (1997). Opposite modulation of opiate withdrawal behaviors on microinfusion of a protein kinase A inhibitor versus activator into the locus coeruleus or periaqueductal gray. Journal of Neuroscience, 17(21), 8520–8527.
