= Warson Woods, Missouri =

- City
- Location of Warson Woods, Missouri
- Coordinates: 38°36′25″N 90°23′29″W
- Country: United States
- State: Missouri
- County: St. Louis

Area
  - Total: 0.57 sq mi (1.47 km^{2})
  - Land: 0.57 sq mi (1.47 km^{2})
  - Water: 0 sq mi (0.00 km^{2})
- Elevation: 594 ft (181 m)

Population (2020)
  - Total: 2,018
  - Density: 3,553.4/sq mi (1,371.99/km^{2})
- Time zone: UTC-6 (Central (CST))
  - Summer (DST): UTC-5 (CDT)
- FIPS code: 29-77182
- GNIS feature ID: 2397202
- Website: www.warsonwoods.com

Warson Woods is a city in St. Louis County, Missouri, United States. As of the 2020 census, Warson Woods had a population of 2,018.

== Geography ==
According to the United States Census Bureau, the city has a total area of 0.58 square miles (1.50 km^{2}), all land.

== Demographics ==
Historical population
Census	Pop.	Note	%±
1940	153		—
1950	529		245.8%
1960	1,746		230.1%
1970	2,544		45.7%
1980	2,127		−16.4%
1990	2,049		−3.7%
2000	1,983		−3.2%
2010	1,962		−1.1%
2020	2,018		2.9%
U.S. Decennial Census

=== Racial and ethnic composition ===
Warson Woods city, Missouri – Racial and ethnic composition Note: the US Census treats Hispanic/Latino as an ethnic category. This table excludes Latinos from the racial categories and assigns them to a separate category. Hispanics/Latinos may be of any race.
Race / Ethnicity (NH = Non-Hispanic)	Pop 2000	Pop 2010	Pop 2020	% 2000	% 2010	% 2020
White alone (NH)	1,934	1,903	1,904	97.53%	96.99%	94.35%
Black or African American alone (NH)	10	9	8	0.50%	0.46%	0.40%
Native American or Alaska Native alone (NH)	0	3	2	0.00%	0.15%	0.10%
Asian alone (NH)	23	13	17	1.16%	0.66%	0.84%
Native Hawaiian or Pacific Islander alone (NH)	0	0	0	0.00%	0.00%	0.00%
Other race alone (NH)	0	0	1	0.00%	0.00%	0.05%
Mixed race or Multiracial (NH)	5	9	56	0.25%	0.46%	2.78%
Hispanic or Latino (any race)	11	25	30	0.55%	1.27%	1.49%
Total	1,983	1,962	2,018	100.00%	100.00%	100.00%

=== 2020 census ===
As of the 2020 census, Warson Woods had a population of 2,018. The median age was 45.0 years. 25.7% of residents were under the age of 18 and 23.9% were 65 years of age or older. For every 100 females, there were 95.7 males, and for every 100 females age 18 and over, there were 92.2 males age 18 and over.

100.0% of residents lived in urban areas, while 0.0% lived in rural areas.

There were 765 households, of which 35.6% had children under the age of 18 living in them. Of all households, 70.6% were married-couple households, 8.1% were households with a male householder and no spouse or partner present, and 19.0% were households with a female householder and no spouse or partner present. About 18.9% of all households were made up of individuals, and 11.5% had someone living alone who was 65 years of age or older.

There were 784 housing units, of which 2.4% were vacant. The homeowner vacancy rate was 0.7% and the rental vacancy rate was 11.5%.

=== 2010 census ===
As of the census of 2010, there were 1,962 people, 760 households, and 568 families living in the city. The population density was 3,382.8 inhabitants per square mile (1,306.1/km^{2}). There were 791 housing units at an average density of 1,363.8 per square mile (526.6/km^{2}). The racial makeup of the city was 97.9% White, 0.5% African American, 0.2% Native American, 0.7% Asian, 0.3% from other races, and 0.6% from two or more races. Hispanic or Latino of any race were 1.3% of the population.

There were 760 households, of which 33.6% had children under the age of 18 living with them, 68.7% were married couples living together, 4.5% had a female householder with no husband present, 1.6% had a male householder with no wife present, and 25.3% were non-families. 23.7% of all households were made up of individuals, and 14.6% had someone living alone who was 65 years of age or older. The average household size was 2.58 and the average family size was 3.07.

The median age in the city was 45.1 years. 27.2% of residents were under the age of 18; 3.5% were between the ages of 18 and 24; 19.2% were from 25 to 44; 28.9% were from 45 to 64; and 21.3% were 65 years of age or older. The gender makeup of the city was 48.4% male and 51.6% female.

=== 2000 census ===
As of the census of 2000, there were 1,983 people, 781 households, and 614 families living in the city. The population density was 3,352.6 inhabitants per square mile (1,294.4/km^{2}). There were 796 housing units at an average density of 1,345.8 per square mile (519.6/km^{2}). The racial makeup of the city was 96.08% White, 2.50% African American, 1.16% Asian, and 0.25% from two or more races. Hispanic or Latino of any race were 0.55% of the population.

There were 781 households, out of which 31.0% had children under the age of 18 living with them, 72.6% were married couples living together, 4.4% had a female householder with no husband present, and 21.3% were non-families. 19.7% of all households were made up of individuals, and 14.0% had someone living alone who was 65 years of age or older. The average household size was 2.54 and the average family size was 2.93.

In the city, the population was spread out, with 25.3% under the age of 18, 3.0% from 18 to 24, 20.6% from 25 to 44, 23.1% from 45 to 64, and 28.0% who were 65 years of age or older. The median age was 46 years. For every 100 females, there were 95.9 males. For every 100 females age 18 and over, there were 91.5 males.

The median income for a household in the city was $87,330, and the median income for a family was $97,147. Males had a median income of $78,684 versus $40,313 for females. The per capita income for the city was $46,575. About 1.6% of families and 2.7% of the population were below the poverty line, including 4.1% of those under age 18 and 2.8% of those age 65 or over.
