= Brian Williams (Missouri politician) =

American politician

Member of the Missouri Senate from the 14th district
- Incumbent
- Assumed office January 9, 2019
- Preceded by: Maria Chappelle-Nadal

Personal details
- Born: Brian Christopher Williams Ferguson, Missouri, U.S.
- Party: Democratic
- Education: Southeast Missouri State University (BA); Lindenwood University (MPA)

Brian Christopher Williams is an American politician who is a member of the Missouri Senate from the 14th district in St. Louis County. Williams resides in University City, Missouri, and is the first Black male to serve in the Missouri Senate in over two decades. He previously held the position of Assistant Minority Floor Leader.

In 2021, Williams sponsored Senate Bills 53 & 60, which enacted significant criminal justice reforms. These reforms included establishing a statewide use-of-force database, prohibiting the use of chokeholds by law enforcement unless deadly force is authorized, and creating a process for vacating wrongful convictions.

His legislative work also focuses on public health policy and economic development in his district and throughout Missouri.

== Career ==
Williams won a contested three-way primary election on August 7, 2018. Williams was elected unopposed in the general election on November 6, 2018 as a member of Democratic Party.

On August 7, 2025, Williams announced he was launching a bid to compete in the 2026 Democratic Primary for St. Louis County Executive.

== Electoral history ==
=== State Senate ===
Missouri Senate Primary Election, August 7, 2018, District 14
Party	Candidate	Votes	%	±%
Democratic	Brian Williams	12,615	40.19%	
Democratic	Sharon L. Pace	11,782	37.53%	
Democratic	Joe Adams	6,993	22.28%	
Total votes		31,390	100	

Missouri Senate Election, November 6, 2018, District 14
Party	Candidate	Votes	%	±%
Democratic	Brian Williams	53,234	100.00%	
Total votes		53,234	100	

Missouri Senate Election, November 8, 2022, District 14
Party	Candidate	Votes	%	±%
Democratic	Brian Williams	41,832	99.94%	
Write-in		24	0.06%	
Total votes		41,856	100.00%	
