= Caleb Jones (politician) =

American politician

Member of the Missouri House of Representatives from the 50th district
- In office January 9, 2013 – January 9, 2017
- Preceded by: Michael Brown
- Succeeded by: Sara Walsh

Member of the Missouri House of Representatives from the 117th district
- In office January 5, 2011 – January 9, 2013
- Preceded by: Kenny Jones
- Succeeded by: Linda Black

Personal details
- Born: January 9, 1980 (age 46)
- Party: Republican
- Profession: Attorney

Caleb Jones (born January 9, 1980) is an American Republican politician. He served as member of the Missouri House of Representatives from the 50th District, being first elected for the 117th District in 2010. He then served as Deputy Chief of Staff to Governor Eric Greitens in 2017. He is currently the CEO for Missouri Electric Cooperatives.

== Biography ==
Caleb grew up in rural Moniteau County, Missouri. The son of a local Sheriff and school teacher, Caleb attending Clarksburg Elementary School and California High School. He excelled in academics and sports as student body president, a member of the 1997 Missouri 3A Football Champions, the 1997 FFA Missouri State Star Farmer, as well as a member of Drama Club, National Honor Society, Show Choir and many other organizations. After high school, Caleb attended the University of Missouri-Columbia majoring in Agricultural Economics in the College of Agriculture, Food and Natural Resources.

== Electoral history ==
2016 General Election for Missouri's 50th District House of Representatives
Party	Candidate	Votes	%
Republican	Caleb Jones	15,705	100
Total votes		15,705	100

2014 General Election for Missouri's 50th District House of Representatives
Party	Candidate	Votes	%
Republican	Caleb Jones	7,832	100
Total votes		7,832	100

2012 General Election for Missouri's 50th District House of Representatives
Party	Candidate	Votes	%
Republican	Caleb Jones	13,425	100
Total votes		13,425	100

2010 General Election for Missouri's 117th District House of Representatives
Party	Candidate	Votes	%
Republican	Caleb Jones	8,401	76.70
Constitution	Jacob Luetkemeyer	2,552	23.30
Total votes		10,953	100
