= St. Louis County Council =

The St. Louis County Council is the seven member legislative body of St. Louis County, Missouri.

== Composition ==
St. Louis County is divided into seven districts, with each district electing one representative to the council. The council chooses its own chair and vice-chair. The councilmen representing even numbered districts are elected in United States presidential years, while councilmen representing odd numbered districts are elected in even numbered years without presidential elections.

== Leadership ==
Position	Name	Party
Chair	Rita Heard Days	Democratic
Vice Chair	Mark Harder	Republican

== Current members ==
District	Councilman	Party
1	Rita Heard Days	Dem
2	Gretchen Bangert	Dem
3	Dennis Hancock	Rep
4	Shalonda Webb	Dem
5	Lisa Clancy	Dem
6	Michael Archer	Rep
7	Mark Harder	Rep

== Committees ==
Committee	Chair
Committee of the Whole	Rita Heard Days
Audit Review Committee	Gretchen Bangert
Ethics Committee	Michael Archer
Budget Committee	Shalonda Webb
Justice, Health, and Welfare	Shalonda Webb
Committee on Disabilities	Lisa Clancy
Revenue and Personnel	Rita Heard Days
Public Improvements	Gretchen Bangert
Charter Position Search	Rita Heard Days
