= 2014 St. Louis County Executive election =

- November 4, 2014

Nominee	Steve Stenger	Rick Stream
Party	Democratic	Republican
Popular vote	139,264	137,452
Percentage	47.73%	47.11%
County Executive before election
Charlie Dooley
Democratic
Elected County Executive
Steve Stenger
Democratic

The 2014 St. Louis County Executive election took place on November 4, 2014. Incumbent County Executive Charlie Dooley ran for re-election to a third term. Dooley faced controversy over an FBI investigation into the county government, and was challenged in the Democratic primary by County Councilman Steve Stenger. Stenger defeated Dooley in a landslide, winning the nomination with 66 percent of the vote, and advanced to the general election, where he faced State Representative Rick Stream, the Republican nominee.

The election took place following the Ferguson protests, which occurred in the county. As Prosecuting Attorney Bob McCulloch came under fire during the protests, his support for Stenger in the Democratic primary prompted a group of prominent Black Democrats in the county to endorse Stream over Stenger.

Though Stenger performed worse than Dooley in majority-Black precincts in the northern part of the county, he narrowly defeated Stream. Stenger won 48 percent of the vote to Stream's 47 percent, a 1,812-vote margin. Stream requested a recount, which slightly narrowed Stenger's margin, but ultimately affirmed his victory.

== Democratic primary ==
=== Candidates ===
- Steve Stenger, County Councilman
- Charlie Dooley, incumbent County Executive
- Ronald E. Levy, retired typesetter, former member of the Bayless School District, 2010 Democratic candidate for County Executive

=== Campaign ===
Dooley sought a third term as County Executive, appointing to his success in overseeing significant economic development in the county over his tenure. Stenger announced that he would challenge Dooley for renomination, arguing that Dooley's management had produced "misguided, unaccountable and really broken government." Stenger announced his challenge with the endorsements of several local elected Democrats, including Prosecuting Attorney Bob McCulloch, and several local labor unions that had historically supported Dooley.

Stenger pointed to an ongoing FBI investigation into county government that revolved around a $3.7 million embezzlement scheme by a county health department employee. Dooley requested funds from the County Council to undertake an independent audit into the embezzlement, but Stenger opposed doing so, attacking Dooley for lax enforcement of management and spending guidelines. When Dooley declined to release a forensic audit, Stenger accused him of going "to great lengths to keep" the information "quiet." The St. Louis Post-Dispatch criticized Dooley's refusal to release the audit, arguing that "before the county spends $94,000" on Dooley's requested audit, "let's see the results of the first one."

Dooley, in turn, attacked Stenger for not supporting women's rights. Following the U.S. Supreme Court's decision in Burwell v. Hobby Lobby Stores, Inc., Dooley criticized Stenger for "helping Hobby Lobby." While as a County Councilman, Dooley sponsored legislation that would have reduced the number of required parking spaces at a proposed Hobby Lobby store. Stenger criticized the attack as "absurd" and "an act of desperation." Dooley also criticized Stenger, an attorney, for his past representation of a "notorious kingpin" in a prostitution case. In a television advertisement, Dooley argued that Stenger "blamed the victims, saying it was a lifestyle they chose." Stenger responded that the advertisement "rises to the level of defamation," and argued that his remarks were taken out of context. Dooley stood by the advertisement, saying, "That's what he said, that's what he believes."

The Post-Dispatch endorsed Stenger over Dooley, noting that while it endorsed Dooley in previous elections, "the last four years have seen one fouled-up mess after another emanate from the ninth floor of the County Government Center in Clayton." It criticized his reliance on local operative John Temporiti, noting that his influence allowed "cronyism and politics, often clumsily executed," to "crop[] up everywhere." The paper acknowledged that, "for better or for worse, [Stenger] is a lesser known quantity," and that he "is a little vague on a long-term vision for St. Louis County," but offered "competent management" when Dooley couldn't.

Ultimately, Stenger defeated Dooley in a landslide, winning 66 percent of the vote to Dooley's 31 percent.

=== Results ===
Democratic primary results
Party	Candidate	Votes	%
Democratic	Steve Stenger	84,993	66.46%
Democratic	Charlie Dooley (inc.)	39,038	30.52%
Democratic	Ronald E. Levy	3,862	3.02%
Total votes		127,893	100.00%

== Republican primary ==
=== Candidates ===
- Rick Stream, State Representative
- Tony Pousosa, Green Park Alderman

==== Declined ====
- Jane Cunningham, former State Senator

=== Results ===
Republican primary results
Party	Candidate	Votes	%
Republican	Rick Stream	34,772	67.90%
Republican	Tony Pousosa	16,439	32.10%
Total votes		51,211	100.00%

== Libertarian primary ==
=== Candidates ===
- Ted Brown, St. Louis Community College District trustee, 2006 and 2010 Libertarian nominee for County Executive

=== Results ===
Libertarian primary results
Party	Candidate	Votes	%
Libertarian	Ted Brown	908	100.00%
Total votes		908	100.00%

== Constitution Party primary ==
=== Candidates ===
- Joe Passanise, retired county engineer, 2006 and 1998 Republican nominee for County Executive

=== Results ===
Constitution Party primary results
Party	Candidate	Votes	%
Constitution	Joe Passanise	908	100.00%
Total votes		908	100.00%

== General election ==
=== Candidates ===
- Steve Stenger, County Councilman (Democratic)
- Rick Stream, State Representative
- Ted Brown, St. Louis Community College District trustee, 2006 and 2010 Libertarian nominee for County Executive (Libertarian)
- Joe Passanise, retired county engineer, 2006 and 1998 Republican nominee for County Executive (Constitution)
- Zaki Baruti, racial justice activist (write-in)

=== Results ===
2014 St. Louis County Executive election
Party	Candidate	Votes	%
Democratic	Steve Stenger	139,264	47.73%
Republican	Rick Stream	137,452	47.11%
Libertarian	Ted Brown	8,063	2.76%
Constitution	Joe Passanise	3,252	1.11%
Independent	Zaki Baruti (write-in)	2,934	1.01%
Write-in		816	0.28%
Total votes		291,781	100.00%
Democratic hold			
