= 2022 St. Louis County Executive election =

- November 8, 2022

Nominee	Sam Page	Mark Mantovani
Party	Democratic	Republican
Popular vote	189,405	168,721
Percentage	51.56%	45.93%
County Executive before election
Sam Page
Democratic
Elected County Executive
Sam Page
Democratic

The 2022 St. Louis County Executive special election took place on November 8, 2022. Incumbent Democratic County Executive Sam Page, who was appointed in 2019 following the resignation of Steve Stenger and won a 2020 special election to serve out the remainder of Stenger's term, ran for re-election. He defeated lobbyist Jane Dueker, former chief of staff to Governor Bob Holden, in the general election, and advanced to the general election. Page was originally set to face State Representative Shamed Dogan, but Dogan lost the Republican primary in an upset to activist and conspiracy theorist Katherine Pinner. Pinner subsequently withdrew from the race, and was replaced by businessman Mark Mantovani, a 2018 and 2020 Democratic candidate for County Executive. Page won re-election by a reduced margin from his 2020 victory, 52–46, as opposed to his 58–36 margin two years prior.

== Democratic primary ==
=== Candidates ===
- Sam Page, incumbent County Executive
- Jane Dueker, attorney and lobbyist, former chief of staff to Governor Bob Holden

=== Polling ===
Poll source	Date(s) administered	Sample size (Note: Key: A – all adults RV – registered voters LV – likely voters V – unclear)	Margin of error	Jane Dueker	Sam Page	Undecided
Vic Fingerhut Campaigns (D)	May 31 – June 3, 2022	300 (RV)	± 5.7%	8%	57%	35%

=== Results ===
Democratic primary results
Party	Candidate	Votes	%
Democratic	Sam Page (inc.)	68,479	63.47%
Democratic	Jane Dueker	39,419	36.53%
Total votes		107,898	100.00%

== Republican primary ==
=== Candidates ===
- Katherine Pinner, Republican activist
- Shamed Dogan, State Representative

=== Results ===
Republican primary results
Party	Candidate	Votes	%
Republican	Katherine Pinner	33,281	56.10%
Republican	Shamed Dogan	26,043	43.90%
Total votes		59,324	100.00%

=== Nomination ===
Pinner's victory over State Representative Shamed Dogan was viewed as a minor upset, given that Pinner was little-known, had spent little money, and promoted conspiracy theories. Shortly after the primary, Pinner told the local Republican Party that she planned on dropping out of the race for an unspecified reason, reversed her decision and affirmed her commitment to staying in the race, and then dropped out again. Following Pinner's withdrawal, the St. Louis County Republican Party selected businessman Mark Mantovani, a former Democrat who ran for the office in 2018 and 2020, as their nominee.

== Green Party primary ==
=== Candidates ===
- Randall Holmes, musician

=== Results ===
Green Party primary results
Party	Candidate	Votes	%
Green	Randall Holmes	103	100.00%
Total votes		103	100.00%

== General election ==
=== Polling ===
Poll source	Date(s) administered	Sample size	Margin of error	Sam Page (D)	Mark Mantovani (R)	Randall Holmes (G)	Undecided
Remington Research Group (R) (Note: Poll sponsored by the Missouri Scout)	October 5–7, 2022	1,012 (LV)	± 3.0%	48%	43%	1%	8%

Hypothetical polling

Sam Page vs. Shamed Dogan

Poll source	Date(s) administered	Sample size	Margin of error	Sam Page (D)	Shamed Dogan (R)	Undecided
Remington Research Group (R)	September 15–16, 2021	542 (LV)	± 4.4%	49%	30%	21%
Remington Research Group (R)	January 20–21, 2021	1,044 (LV)	± 3.0%	49%	32%	19%

=== Results ===
2022 St. Louis County Executive special election
Party	Candidate	Votes	%
Democratic	Sam Page (inc.)	189,405	51.56%
Republican	Mark Mantovani	168,721	45.93%
Green	Randall Holmes	9,193	2.50%
Total votes		367,319	100.00%
Democratic hold			

== Notes ==
Partisan clients
