= 2026 St. Louis County Executive election =

Local election in Missouri, US

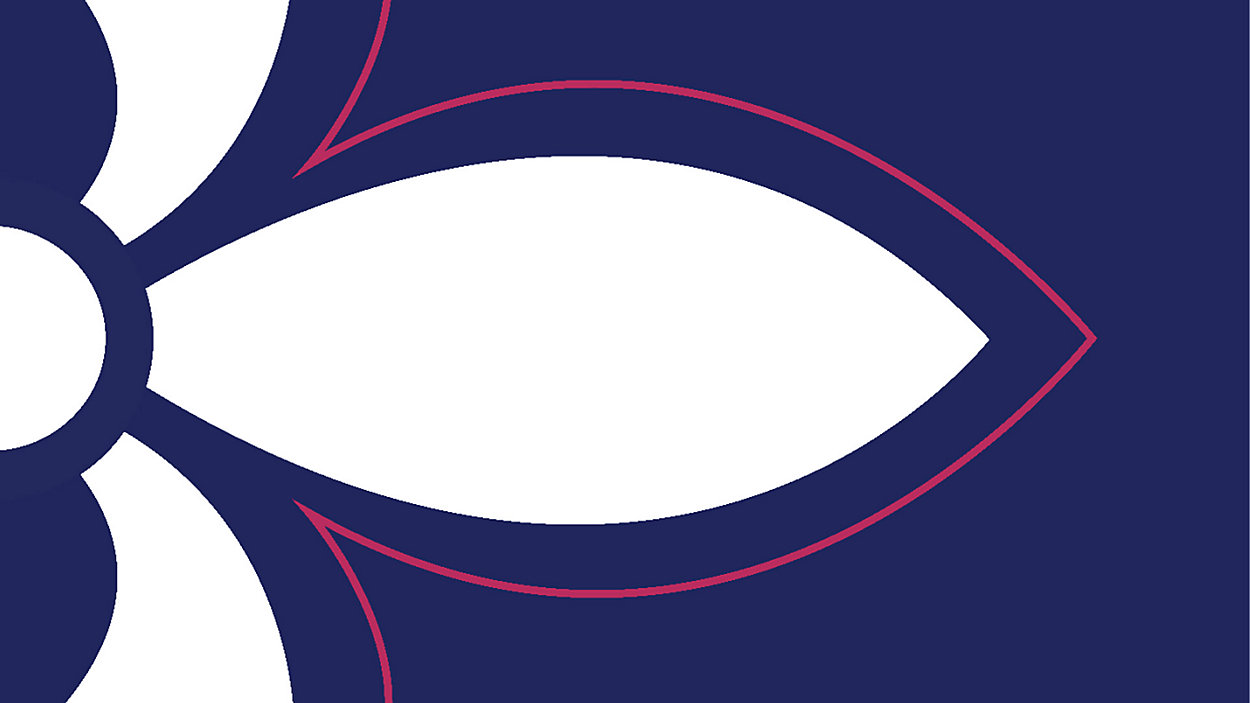
- November 3, 2026
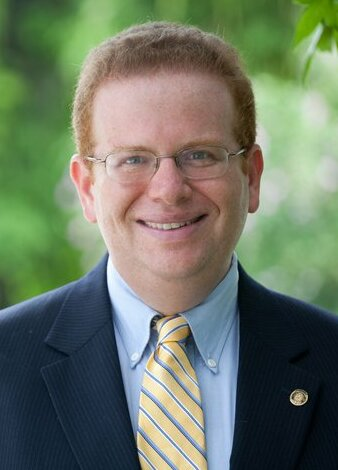

Nominee	Jake Zimmerman	Dennis Hancock
Party	Democratic	Republican
Popular vote	251,305	126,949
Percentage	65.07%	32.87%
County Executive before election
Sam Page
Democratic
Elected County Executive
Jake Zimmerman
Democratic

The 2026 St. Louis County Executive election was held on November 3, 2026, to elect the county executive of St. Louis County, Missouri. The party primaries were held on August 4, 2026. Incumbent Sam Page declined to seek re-election to a second full term.

== Democratic primary ==
=== Candidates ===
==== Declared ====
- Angela Mosley, state senator
- Brian Williams, state senator
- Jake Zimmerman, county assessor, former state representative and candidate for county executive in 2020

==== Declined ====
- Sam Page, incumbent county executive
- Shalonda Webb, county councilmember (endorsed Williams)
- Lisa Clancy, county councilmember

=== Polling ===
Poll source	Date(s) administered	Sample size (Note: Key: A – all adults RV – registered voters LV – likely voters V – unclear)	Margin of error	Angela Mosley	Brian Williams	Jake Zimmerman	Undecided
20-20 Insights	July 18–20, 2026	435 (LV)	± 4.7%	10%	19%	28%	43%
	April 3–4, 2026	600 (LV)	± 4.0%	16%	16%	16%	52%

=== Results ===
Democratic primary
Party	Candidate	Votes	%
Democratic	Jake Zimmerman	74,647	46.45%
Democratic	Brian Williams	54,021	33.62%
Democratic	Angela Mosley	32,036	19.93%
Total votes			

== Republican primary ==
=== Nominee ===
- Dennis Hancock, county councilmember and former mayor of Fenton

== Green primary ==
=== Nominee ===
- J.D. McFarland

== General election ==
=== Results ===
2026 St. Louis County Executive election
Party	Candidate	Votes	%
Democratic	Jake Zimmerman		
Republican	Dennis Hancock		
Missouri Green Party	J.D. McFarland		
Total votes			
