= 2020 St. Louis County Executive special election =

- November 3, 2020

Nominee	Sam Page	Paul Berry III
Party	Democratic	Republican
Popular vote	307,154	191,839
Percentage	58.27%	36.39%
County Executive before election
Sam Page
Democratic
Elected County Executive
Sam Page
Democratic

The 2020 St. Louis County Executive special election took place on November 3, 2020. On April 29, 2019, County Executive Steve Stenger resigned following a federal indictment for bribery and fraud. The County Council elected Council Chairman Sam Page to serve as County Executive until the 2020 special election.

Page ran to serve out the remainder of Stenger's term. He faced a competitive Democratic primary, with challenges from 2018 candidate Mark Mantovani and County Assessor Jake Zimmerman, and won the primary with a 38 percent plurality. In the general election, he was challenged by Paul Berry III, the Republican nominee, who previously ran for the office in 2018. Page won re-election in a landslide, receiving 58 percent of the vote to Berry's 36 percent.

== Democratic primary ==
=== Candidates ===
- Sam Page, incumbent County Executive
- Mark Mantovani, businessman, lawyer, 2018 Democratic candidate for County Executive
- Jake Zimmerman, County Assessor
- Jamie Tolliver, life coach, publishing company owner

=== Polling ===
Poll source	Date(s) administered	Sample size (Note: Key: A – all adults RV – registered voters LV – likely voters V – unclear)	Margin of error	Mark Mantovani	Sam Page	Jake Zimmerman	Undecided
Remington Research Group (R) (Note: Poll sponsored by the Missouri Scout)	November 6–7, 2019	612 (LV)	± 4.0%	19%	33%	–	48%
Remington Research Group (R)	November 6–7, 2019	612 (LV)	± 4.0%	21%	26%	17%	36%

Hypothetical polling

Poll source	Date(s) administered	Sample size	Margin of error	Maria Chappelle-Nadal	Mark Mantovani	Sam Page	Brian Williams	Jake Zimmerman	Undecided
Remington Research Group (R)	November 6–7, 2019	612 (LV)	± 4.0%	11%	18%	24%	–	14%	33%
Remington Research Group (R)	November 6–7, 2019	612 (LV)	± 4.0%	–	14%	25%	7%	15%	39%

=== Results ===
Democratic primary results
Party	Candidate	Votes	%
Democratic	Sam Page (inc.)	71,006	38.10%
Democratic	Mark Mantovani	55,129	29.58%
Democratic	Jake Zimmerman	45,665	24.50%
Democratic	Jamie Tolliver	14,553	7.81%
Total votes		186,353	100.00%

== Republican primary ==
=== Candidates ===
- Paul Berry III, bail bondsman and political commentator, 2018 Republican nominee for County Executive
- Ed Golterman, civic activist, 2004 Republican nominee for County Executive

=== Results ===
Republican primary results
Party	Candidate	Votes	%
Republican	Paul Berry III	28,938	57.98%
Republican	Ed Golterman	20,974	42.02%
Total votes		49,912	100.00%

== Libertarian primary ==
=== Candidates ===
- Ted Brown, perennial candidate, former firefighter and police officer

=== Results ===
Libertarian primary results
Party	Candidate	Votes	%
Libertarian	Ted Brown	743	100.00%
Total votes		743	100.00%

== Green Party primary ==
=== Candidates ===
- Betsey Mitchell, businesswoman, retired educator

=== Results ===
Green Party primary results
Party	Candidate	Votes	%
Green	Betsey Mitchell	199	100.00%
Total votes		199	100.00%

== General election ==
=== Results ===
2020 St. Louis County Executive special election
Party	Candidate	Votes	%
Democratic	Sam Page (inc.)	307,154	58.27%
Republican	Paul Berry III	191,839	36.39%
Green	Betsey Mitchell	16,654	3.16%
Libertarian	Ted Brown	11,496	2.18%
Write-in		2	0.00%
Total votes		527,145	100.00%
Democratic hold			

== Notes ==
Partisan clients
