= 2006 St. Louis County Executive election =

- November 7, 2006
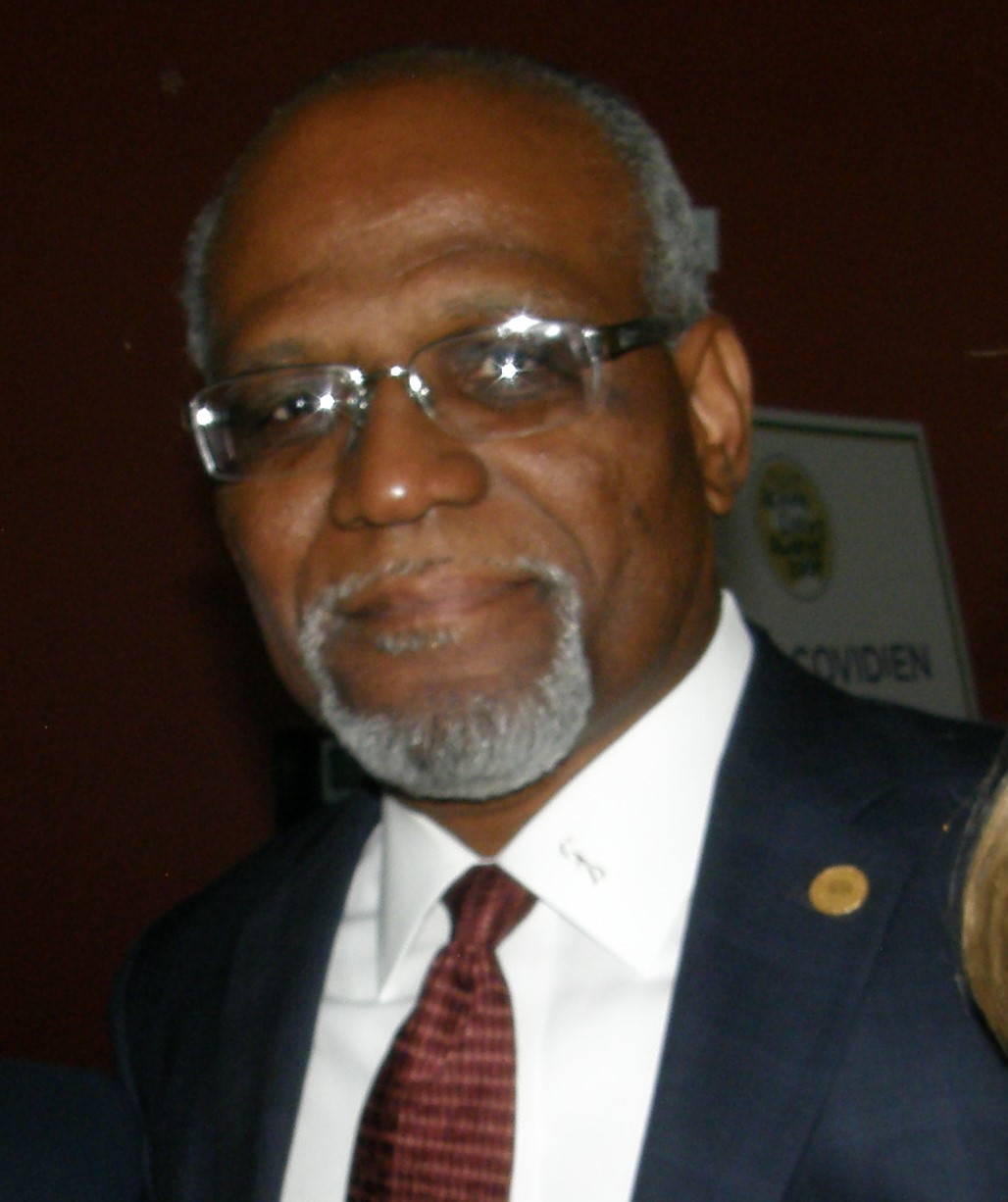

Nominee	Charlie Dooley	Joe Passanise
Party	Democratic	Republican
Popular vote	272,465	124,850
Percentage	67.34%	30.86%
County Executive before election
Charlie Dooley
Democratic
Elected County Executive
Charlie Dooley
Democratic

The 2006 St. Louis County Executive election took place on November 7, 2006. Incumbent County Executive Charlie Dooley, who was elected to serve out the remainder of former Executive Buzz Westfall's term, ran for re-election to a full term. After defeating two little-known candidates in the Democratic primary, Dooley advanced to the general election, where was challenged by Joe Passanise, a retired engineer and the 1998 Republican nominee for County Executive. Dooley defeated Passanise in a landslide, winning 67 percent of the vote.

== Democratic primary ==
=== Candidates ===
- Charlie Dooley, incumbent County Executive
- Charlotte Meshell, community activist, 2004 Democratic candidate for County Executive
- Carl Johnson, retired security officer, 2004 Democratic candidate for County Executive

=== Results ===
Democratic primary results
Party	Candidate	Votes	%
Democratic	Charlie Dooley (inc.)	39,620	79.57%
Democratic	Charlotte Meshell	6,891	13.84%
Democratic	Carl Johnson	3,281	6.59%
Total votes		49,792	100.00%

== Republican primary ==
=== Candidates ===
- Joe Passanise, retired county engineer, 1998 Republican nominee for County Executive

=== Results ===
Republican primary results
Party	Candidate	Votes	%
Republican	Joe Passanise	35,413	100.00%
Total votes		35,413	100.00%

== Libertarian primary ==
=== Candidates ===
- Ted Brown, former firefighter and police officer, 2004 Libertarian nominee for County Executive

=== Results ===
Libertarian primary results
Party	Candidate	Votes	%
Libertarian	Ted Brown	308	100.00%
Total votes		308	100.00%

== General election ==
=== Results ===
2006 St. Louis County Executive election
Party	Candidate	Votes	%
Democratic	Charlie Dooley (inc.)	272,465	67.34%
Republican	Joe Passanise	124,850	30.86%
Libertarian	Ted Brown	7,158	1.77%
Write-in		125	0.03%
Total votes		404,598	100.00%
Democratic hold			
