= 2002 St. Louis County Executive election =

- November 5, 2002

| Nominee | Buzz Westfall | Craig Borchelt |
| Party | Democratic | Republican |
| Popular vote | 223,355 | 151,893 |
| Percentage | 57.88% | 39.36% |
County Executive before election
Buzz Westfall
Democratic
Elected County Executive
Buzz Westfall
Democratic

The 2002 St. Louis County Executive election took place on November 5, 2002. Incumbent Democratic County Executive Buzz Westfall ran for re-election to a fourth term. He won the Democratic primary by a wide margin and then faced attorney and Monsanto consultant Craig Borchelt in the general election. Westfall defeated Borchelt in a landslide, winning his fourth term with 58 percent of the vote. However, less than a year later, Westfall died, triggering a 2004 special election.

== Democratic primary ==
=== Candidates ===
- Buzz Westfall, incumbent County Executive
- David J. Lee, electrician, U.S. Army veteran

=== Results ===
Democratic primary results
| Party | Candidate | Votes | % |
|---|---|---|---|
| Democratic | Buzz Westfall (inc.) | 47,844 | 69.35% |
| Democratic | David J. Lee | 21,143 | 30.65% |
| Total votes | | 68,987 | 100.00% |

== Republican primary ==
=== Candidates ===
- Craig Borchelt, lawyer, Monsanto program manager
- Gregory B. Powers, insurance broker
- Robert J. Crump, restaurant manager, 1998 Republican candidate for County Executive

=== Results ===
Republican primary results
| Party | Candidate | Votes | % |
|---|---|---|---|
| Republican | Craig Borchelt | 22,814 | 43.05% |
| Republican | Gregory B. Powers | 15,757 | 29.73% |
| Republican | Robert J. Crump | 14,425 | 27.22% |
| Total votes | | 52,996 | 100.00% |

== Libertarian primary ==
=== Candidates ===
- Thomas Boehm, graduate student, former minister

=== Results ===
Libertarian primary results
| Party | Candidate | Votes | % |
|---|---|---|---|
| Libertarian | Thomas Boehm | 535 | 100.00% |
| Total votes | | 535 | 100.00% |

== General election ==
=== Results ===
2002 St. Louis County Executive election
| Party | Candidate | Votes | % |
|---|---|---|---|
| Democratic | Buzz Westfall (inc.) | 223,355 | 57.88% |
| Republican | Craig Borchelt | 151,893 | 39.36% |
| Green | Terri Zeman | 5,764 | 1.49% |
| Libertarian | Thomas Boehm | 4,875 | 1.26% |
| Write-in | | 1 | 0.00% |
| Total votes | | 385,888 | 100.00% |
| Democratic hold | | | |
