= 2026 in Missouri =

- Decades: 2000s; 2010s; 2020s
- See also: History of Missouri; Historical outline of Missouri; List of years in Missouri; 2026 in the United States

The following is a list of events of the year 2026 in Missouri.

== Incumbents ==
=== State government ===
- Governor: Mike Kehoe (R)

== Events ==
- January 8 – Several monkeys are reported as being on the loose in a St. Louis park.
- February 12 – A woman sets part of a warehouse on fire in Kansas City. The warehouse was under consideration to be used as an Immigration and Customs Enforcement detention center. The same day, the company that owns the warehouse announces they will not sell it to the federal government.
- February 24 – Custodial workers discover explosives in a bag near the National World War I Museum and Memorial in Kansas City. A suspect is charged on March 4.
- March 30 – The Festus City Council votes 6-2 to move forward with developing a data center on 360 acres of land.
- April 2 – The University of Missouri announces they will cut funding to five student organizations for Asian, Black, Latino, and LGBTQ students.
- April 28 – Hailstorms hit the Springfield area. An emu at the Dickerson Park Zoo is killed by hail and vehicles parked at the Springfield-Branson National Airport are damaged.
- June 11–July 19 – The United States hosts the 2026 FIFA World Cup, with a number of matches being held in Arrowhead Stadium.
- June 14 – Butler plane crash: 12 people are killed when a skydiving plane crashes near Butler Memorial Airport in Butler.
- June 18 – A judge strikes down some of Missouri's restrictions on abortion, ruling that they violate a state constitutional amendment approved by voters in 2024.
- June 19 – Five people are killed by carbon monoxide at a home near Rolla.
- July 12 – The former Embassy Suites hotel building near Country Club Plaza, Saint Luke's Hospital, and Westport is imploded in Kansas City. Saint Luke's owns the former building and plans for a potential hospital expansion.
- September 3 – Thomas Ross, the Republican nominee for Joplin-area District 161 in the 2026 Missouri House of Representatives election, is charged with conspiracy to distribute a controlled substance. Prosecutors accuse Ross of asking his campaign manager to plant cocaine and Adderall on his opponent, Louise Secker, prior to the August 4 primary.
- September 10 – The Supreme Court of Missouri finds Secretary of State Denny Hoskins in contempt for instructing the state to use a new congressional map that favors Republicans despite the U.S. Supreme Court ruling against it. However, the Missouri Supreme Court absolves him after he agrees to revert to the old boundaries.
- October 21 – St. Louis City SC beats the Columbus Crew on penalties to win the 2026 U.S. Open Cup.
- November 3 – 2026 Missouri elections:
  - 2026 Missouri Amendment 3
  - 2026 Missouri Amendment 4
  - 2026 Missouri State Auditor election
  - 2026 St. Louis County Executive election
  - 2026 Missouri House of Representatives election
  - 2026 Missouri State Senate election
  - 2026 St. Charles County Executive election
  - 2026 United States House of Representatives elections in Missouri
- November 12 – A stabbing attack occurs at a middle school in Warrenton, injuring two students and a teacher. The attacker is arrested.

=== Sports ===
- 2026 St. Louis Cardinals season
- 2025–26 St. Louis Blues season

== See also ==
- 2026 in the United States
