= 1968 Missouri gubernatorial election =

- November 5, 1968
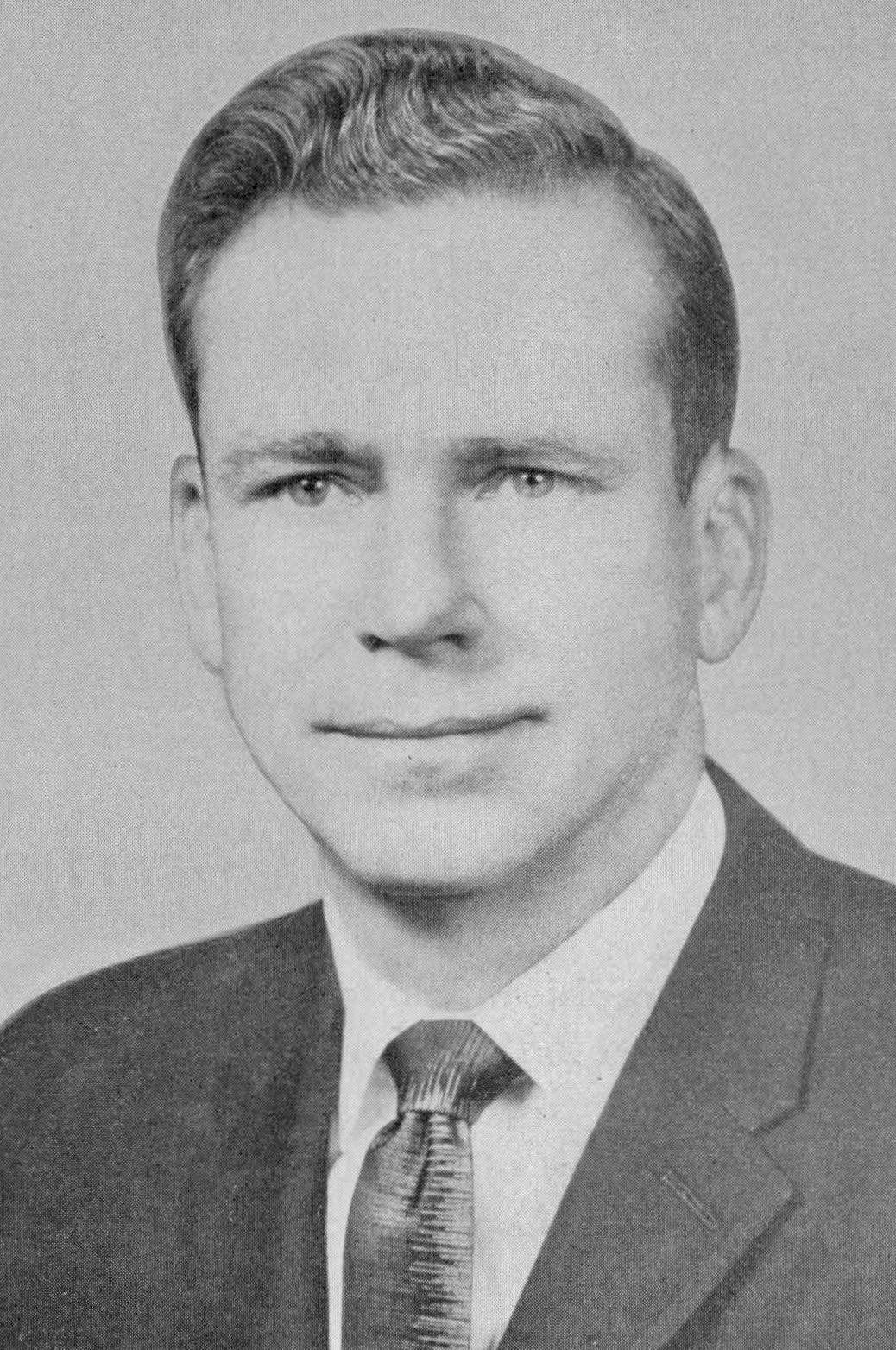

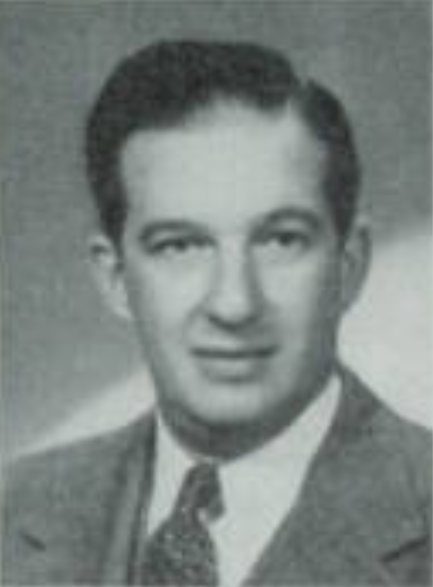
Nominee	Warren E. Hearnes	Lawrence K. Roos
Party	Democratic	Republican
Popular vote	1,072,805	691,797
Percentage	60.80%	39.20%
- County results Hearnes: 50–60% 60–70% 70–80% 80–90% Roos: 50–60% 60–70%
Governor before election
Warren E. Hearnes
Democratic
Elected Governor
Warren E. Hearnes
Democratic

The 1968 Missouri gubernatorial election was held on November 5, 1968, and resulted in a victory for the Democratic nominee, incumbent Governor Warren E. Hearnes, over the Republican candidate, St. Louis County Executive Lawrence K. Roos. This election was the first time that an incumbent governor of Missouri was re-elected and won a second term.

== Results ==
1968 gubernatorial election, Missouri
Party	Candidate	Votes	%	±%
Democratic	Warren E. Hearnes (incumbent)	1,072,805	60.80	−1.26
Republican	Lawrence K. Roos	691,797	39.20	+1.26
Majority		381,008	21.60	−2.52
Turnout		1,764,402	40.85	−0.58
Democratic hold		Swing		
