= 2004 St. Louis County Executive special election =

- November 2, 2004
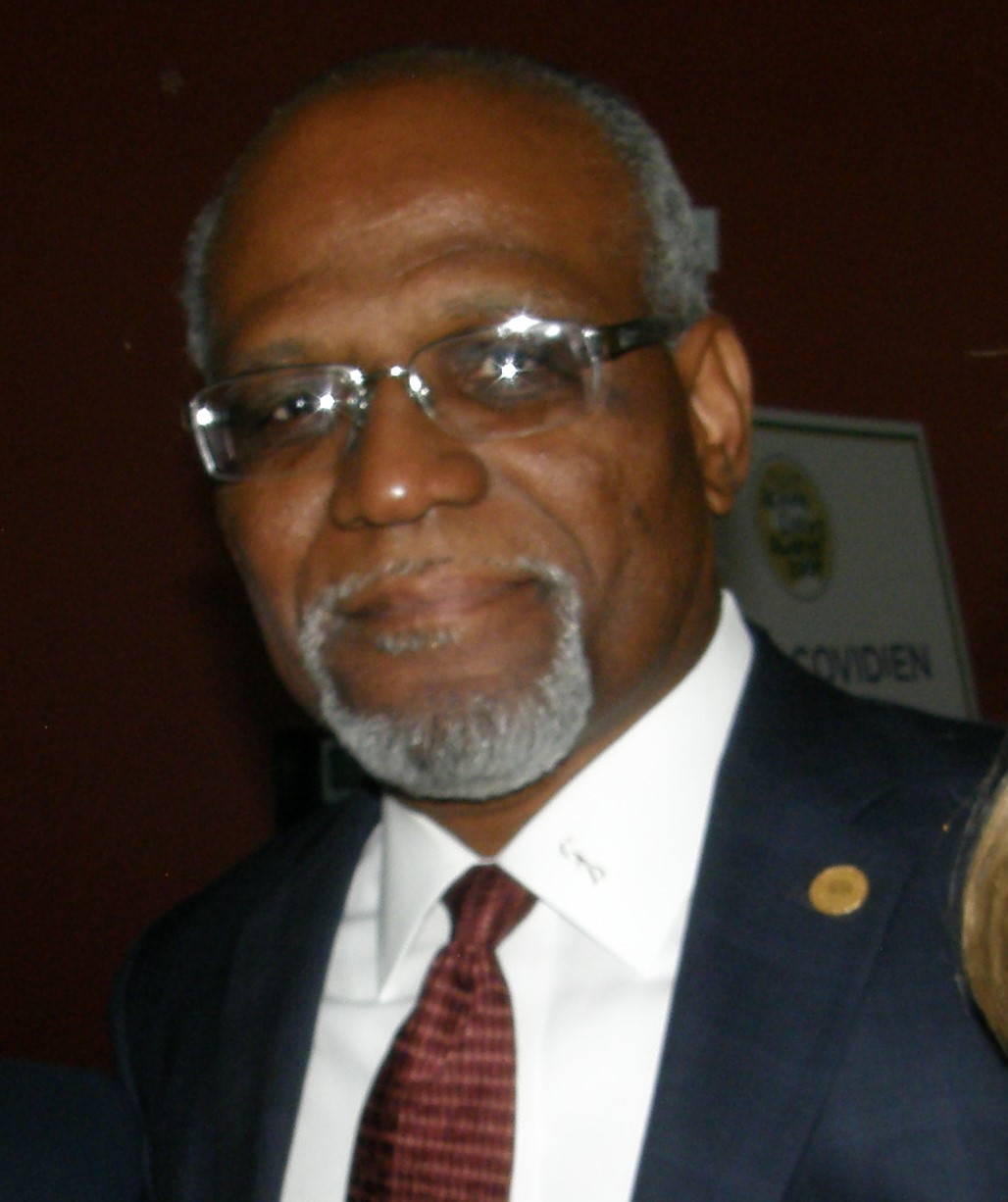

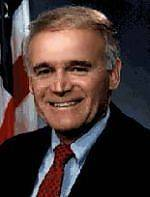
| Nominee | Charlie Dooley | Gene McNary |
| Party | Democratic | Republican |
| Popular vote | 280,520 | 242,903 |
| Percentage | 52.90% | 45.80% |
County Executive before election
Charlie Dooley
Democratic
Elected County Executive
Charlie Dooley
Democratic

The 2004 St. Louis County Executive special election took place on November 2, 2004. County Executive Buzz Westfall, who was elected to his fourth term in 2002, died on October 27, 2003, following an illness. County Councilman Charlie Dooley, who briefly served as Acting County Executive as Westfall's condition worsened, was elected by the Council to serve until a special election could be held.

Dooley ran in the special election to serve out the remainder of Westfall's term. He won the primary election and advanced to the general election, where he faced former County executive Gene McNary. Dooley defeated McNary, 53–46 percent, a narrower margin than Westfall's past elections and slightly worse than Democratic presidential nominee John Kerry's performance in the presidential election.

== Democratic primary ==
=== Candidates ===
- Charlie Dooley, incumbent County Executive
- Charlotte Meshell, neighborhood activist
- Carl Johnson, security guard
- David J. Lee, electrician, 2002 Democratic candidate for County Executive
- Thomas Patrick Van Berkel, computer network engineer
- John Basil Moldovan, retired engineer

=== Results ===
Democratic primary results
| Party | Candidate | Votes | % |
|---|---|---|---|
| Democratic | Charlie Dooley (inc.) | 89,760 | 65.46% |
| Democratic | Charlotte Meshell | 22,503 | 16.41% |
| Democratic | Carl Johnson | 9,130 | 6.66% |
| Democratic | David J. Lee | 8,315 | 6.06% |
| Democratic | Thomas Patrick Van Berkel | 4,214 | 3.07% |
| Democratic | John Basil Moldovan | 3,199 | 2.33% |
| Total votes | | 137,121 | 100.00% |

== Republican primary ==
=== Candidates ===
- Gene McNary, former County Executive, former Commissioner of the U.S. Immigration and Naturalization Service
- Kurt Odenwald, County Councilman
- Dennis Hancock, Mayor of Fenton
- Edward L. Golterman, civic activist

=== Results ===
Republican primary results
| Party | Candidate | Votes | % |
|---|---|---|---|
| Republican | Gene McNary | 45,182 | 48.44% |
| Republican | Kurt Odenwald | 40,643 | 43.57% |
| Republican | Dennis Hancock | 5,538 | 5.94% |
| Republican | Edward L. Golterman | 1,912 | 2.05% |
| Total votes | | 93,275 | 100.00% |

== Libertarian primary ==
=== Candidates ===
- Ted Brown, former firefighter and police officer

=== Results ===
Libertarian primary results
| Party | Candidate | Votes | % |
|---|---|---|---|
| Libertarian | Ted Brown | 401 | 100.00% |
| Total votes | | 401 | 100.00% |

== General election ==
=== Results ===
2004 St. Louis County Executive special election
| Party | Candidate | Votes | % |
|---|---|---|---|
| Democratic | Charlie Dooley (inc.) | 280,520 | 52.90% |
| Republican | Gene McNary | 242,903 | 45.80% |
| Libertarian | Thomas Boehm | 6,879 | 1.30% |
| Total votes | | 530,302 | 100.00% |
| Democratic hold | | | |
