= Andrew Koenig (disambiguation) =

Andrew Koenig (1968–2010) was an American actor.

Andrew Koenig may also refer to:

- Andrew Koenig (programmer) (born 1952), American programmer
- Andrew Koenig (politician) (born 1982), American politician, member of the Missouri Senate
