= Bob McCulloch (prosecutor) =

American lawyer and prosecutor (born 1951)

St. Louis County Prosecuting Attorney
- In office January 1991 – January 1, 2019
- Succeeded by: Wesley Bell

Personal details
- Born: Robert Paul McCulloch; July 27, 1951 (age 75) St. Louis, Missouri, U.S.
- Party: Democratic
- Education: Saint Louis University School of Law (J.D.)

Robert Paul McCulloch (born July 27, 1951) is an American former prosecutor who was the American prosecuting attorney for St. Louis County, Missouri from 1991 until 2019. A Democrat, McCulloch historically had bipartisan support as a prosecutor and won reelection in 1994, 1998, 2002, 2006, 2010 and 2014, often unopposed, but by wide margins when he had an opponent. McCulloch held the highest paid position within St. Louis County government with an annual salary of $160,000. In 2018, he lost his bid for reelection in the Democratic primary to reformist challenger Wesley Bell by a 13.12% margin.

McCulloch was the chief prosecutor in office overseeing the case related to the shooting of Michael Brown, which attracted considerable controversy and media attention, both nationally and internationally.

== Education and early career ==
After attending law school at Saint Louis University, McCulloch served as a clerk for Missouri Appeals Court judge Joseph G. Stewart. McCulloch was an assistant prosecuting attorney from 1978 to 1985. He worked in private practice until 1991, when he was elected to the post of prosecuting attorney. McCulloch was president of the Missouri Association of Prosecuting Attorneys and a board member of the National District Attorneys Association.

== Tenure as P.A. ==
Just after he first took office in the early 1990s, McCulloch prosecuted Axl Rose of the band Guns N' Roses on charges related to the Riverport Riot in which 40 concert attendees and 25 police officers were injured. McCulloch charged Rose with misdemeanor assault and property damage for allegedly hitting a security guard, hurting three concertgoers and damaging a dressing room at Riverport Amphitheatre. McCulloch made headlines when he pursued Rose across the country to serve an arrest warrant in the case before Rose finally turned himself in and agreed to a plea deal.

In 2000, in the so-called "Jack in the Box" case, two undercover officers, a police officer and a Drug Enforcement Administration (DEA) officer, shot and killed two unarmed black men in the parking lot of a Jack in the Box fast-food restaurant in Berkeley, Missouri. In 2001, the officers told a grand jury convened by McCulloch that the suspects tried to escape arrest and then drove toward them; the jury declined to indict. McCulloch told the public that every witness had testified to confirm this version, but St. Louis Post-Dispatch journalist Michael Sorkin reviewed the previously secret grand jury tapes, released to him by McCulloch, and found that McCulloch's statement was untrue: only three of 13 officers testified that the car was moving forward. A subsequent federal investigation found that the men were unarmed and that their car had not moved forward when the officers fired 21 shots; nevertheless, federal investigators decided that the shooting was justified because the officers feared for their safety. McCulloch also drew controversy when he said of the victims: "These guys were bums." The two men killed, Earl Murray and Ronald Beasley, had prior felony convictions on drug and assault charges.

In 2013, McCulloch publicly switched his longtime allegiance from fellow Democrat and St. Louis County Executive Charlie Dooley to support Dooley's challenger in the Democratic primary for county executive, Steve Stenger, stating that Dooley oversaw too much corruption in the county. Stenger won over Dooley in the August 5, 2014, primary by a landslide.

As of July 2017, McCulloch still refused to enforce fare-evasion tickets issued for non-paying riders on MetroLink (St. Louis), despite growing concerns over safety and security on MetroLink and MetroBus facilities. According to McCulloch, “Only peace officers are capable of writing a summons or making an arrest for a misdemeanor violation, and the MetroLink employees, no matter what they call them, are not and cannot be peace officers.” At the time it was reported that St. Louis County officers, whose tickets McCulloch would presumably enforce, had been caught neglecting assigned MetroLink patrols.

In May 2018, McCulloch's office filed charges on a dismissed restraining order that was filed against a woman protesting a city police officer who she claimed had raped her. In the Democratic primary on August 7, McCulloch in an upset lost handily to Wesley Bell who ran on a criminal justice reform platform. During that campaign, McCulloch claimed that his office does not file bail bonds for misdemeanors; however, an ACLU of Missouri report showed this to be false. On August 16, McCulloch as an invited speaker at an Oregon prosecutors conference made several remarks considered so unprofessional and characterized by some as "racially insensitive" that several walked out and subsequently boycotted a later keynote speech, including the entire staff of one district attorney office.

== Michael Brown case ==
After the August 9, 2014, shooting of Michael Brown by Ferguson, Missouri police officer Darren Wilson, McCulloch announced that rather than making a decision about whether to arrest Wilson, he would bring the case before a grand jury, leaving to jurors the decision of what charges might be brought, if any. His spokesman acknowledged that it was unusual that the prosecutor was not asking the grand jury to endorse a specific charge. It was also unusual to present a case to a grand jury before the police investigation was over.

Cornell Brooks, the president of the National Association for the Advancement of Colored People (NAACP), called for a special prosecutor to replace McCulloch in the case, saying that was needed to restore credibility with Ferguson's black community.

On November 24, McCulloch reported in a press conference that the grand jury reached a decision in the case and elected "not to indict Wilson". Immediately after the announcement, McCulloch said that he appointed prosecutors in his office to handle the case, rather than himself, because "he was 'fully aware of unfounded but growing concern that the investigation might not be fair.'"

In his 23 years on the job, this was the fifth time McCulloch presented evidence to a grand jury in a shooting by police; in each case, the grand jury came back without an indictment.

=== Post-case analysis ===
Following the grand jury result, criticism was directed at McCulloch over the handling, result, and other aspects of the grand jury process, while other analysts defended his handling of the matter.

Former Supreme Court clerk Eric Citron wrote on SCOTUSblog, that the grand jury investigation was atypical. Citron argues that, based on case law – a question raised in United States v. Williams – prosecutors can withhold "substantial exculpatory evidence" in order to obtain an indictment, as the role of the grand jury is not to determine guilt, but rather to decide whether there is enough evidence of a crime; exculpatory evidence can be presented at trial. Citron presented the dissent from Justice Stevens, who said that the prosecutor need not "ferret out and present all evidence that could be used at trial to create a reasonable doubt as to defendant's guilt." Citron then asserts that when a prosecutor wants an indictment, a grand jury process like what happened in Wilson's case would not be expected.

Other legal experts asserted that McCulloch deflected responsibility for failing to indict Wilson, and created conditions in which the grand jury would not indict him either. Ronald S. Sullivan Jr., director of the Harvard Criminal Justice Institute at Harvard University, said that "As a strategic move, it was smart; he got what he wanted without being seen as directly responsible for the result," and called the case "the most unusual marshaling of a grand jury's resources I've seen in my 25 years as a lawyer and scholar."

The New Yorker's legal analyst, attorney Jeffrey Toobin, criticized McCulloch for implementing "a document dump, an approach that is virtually without precedent in the law of Missouri or anywhere else", and stated that despite the effort to represent the process as "an independent evaluation of the evidence", McCulloch remained in control of the process. Toobin wrote that in the presentation of the grand jury decision, McCulloch cherry-picked the evidence that was most exculpatory of Wilson, and asserted that McCulloch "gave Wilson's case special treatment".

Radio talk show host and attorney Michael Smerconish wrote in The Philadelphia Inquirer that McCulloch was in a no-win position and gave the case to the grand jury, despite a lack of evidence, to prove probable cause because the public would not accept a unilateral decision by McCulloch. Smerconish said the grand jury proceedings were atypical because they presented all the evidence and included testimony by the subject of the investigation, Darren Wilson. Smerconish said conflicting witness statements which could support indictments were not backed up by the forensic evidence.

Former United States federal judge Paul G. Cassell, writing for the Volokh Conspiracy blog, said that "Contrary to the complaints of some critics, the grand jury process was clearly fair." Cassell countered critics by saying that the grand jury did not deviate from the normal process, except for the prosecutor not making any particular recommendation for charges. Cassell said objections that the grand jury took too long were silent on the parallel federal investigation being run. The argument that too much evidence was presented in to the grand jury, compromising the process, was described by Cassell as an attempt to manufacture a weakness.

== Personal life ==
McCulloch is the son of a St. Louis City K-9 police officer who was killed in the line of duty while searching for a fleeing kidnapper in the Pruitt-Igoe Housing Complex when McCulloch was 12 years old. When he was in high school at Augustinian Academy, McCulloch lost a leg to cancer.

McCulloch and his wife Carolyn have four children.

His son, Matthew McCulloch, a St. Louis County police officer, is suspected of shooting into the air at a children's trunk or treat event on Sunday, October 16, 2023 in Kirkwood, Missouri.
