= 1980 United States Senate election in Missouri =

- November 4, 1980
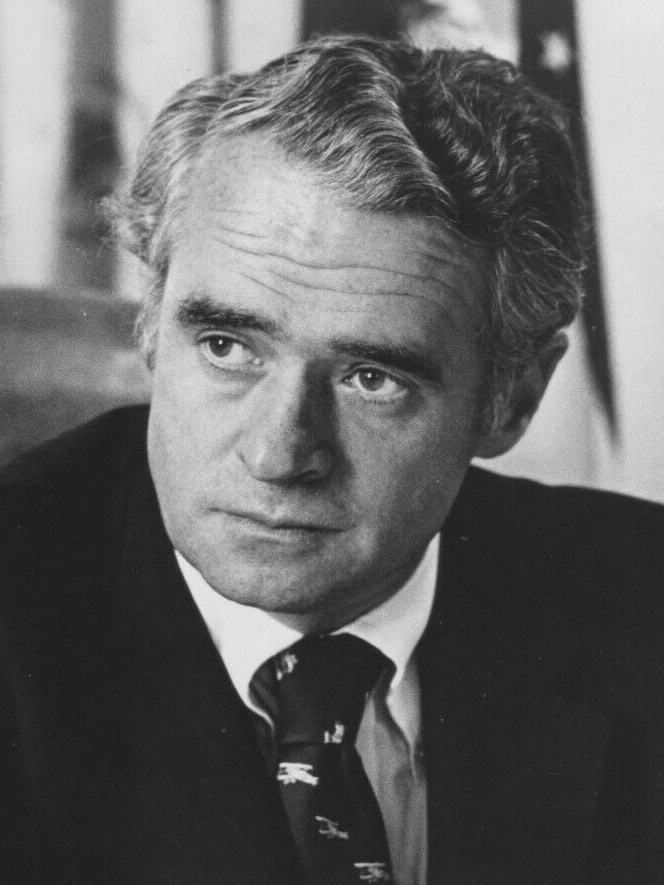

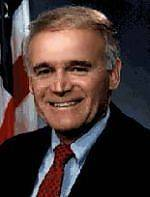
Nominee	Thomas Eagleton	Gene McNary
Party	Democratic	Republican
Popular vote	1,074,859	985,399
Percentage	52.00%	47.67%
- County results Eagleton: 50–60% 60–70% 70–80% McNary: 50–60% 60–70% 70–80%
U.S. senator before election
Thomas Eagleton
Democratic
Elected U.S. Senator
Thomas Eagleton
Democratic

The 1980 United States Senate election in Missouri was held on November 4, 1980. Incumbent Senator Thomas Eagleton defeated Republican nominee Gene McNary with 52.00% of the vote. As of 2024, this is the last time the Democrats won the Class 3 Senate seat in Missouri.

== Primary elections ==
Primary elections were held on August 5, 1980.

=== Democratic primary ===
==== Candidates ====
- Thomas Eagleton, incumbent United States Senator
- Lee C. Sutton, former State Representative
- Herb Fillmore

==== Results ====
Democratic primary results
Party	Candidate	Votes	%
Democratic	Thomas Eagleton (incumbent)	553,392	85.75
Democratic	Lee C. Sutton	53,280	8.26
Democratic	Herb Fillmore	38,677	5.99
Total votes		645,349	100.00

=== Republican primary ===
==== Candidates ====
- Gene McNary, County Executive of St. Louis County
- David Doctorian, State Senator
- Morris Duncan
- Gregory Hansman

==== Results ====
Republican primary results
Party	Candidate	Votes	%
Republican	Gene McNary	197,060	61.53
Republican	David Doctorian	82,332	25.71
Republican	Morris Duncan	21,959	6.86
Republican	Gregory Hansman	18,893	5.90
Total votes		320,244	100.00

== General election ==
=== Candidates ===
Major party candidates

- Thomas Eagleton, Democratic
- Gene McNary, Republican

Other candidates

- Martha Pettit, Socialist Workers

=== Results ===
1980 United States Senate election in Missouri
Party	Candidate	Votes	%	±%
Democratic	Thomas Eagleton (incumbent)	1,074,859	52.00%	
Republican	Gene McNary	985,399	47.67%	
Socialist Workers	Martha Pettit	6,707	0.32%	
Majority		89,460		
Turnout		2,066,965		
Democratic hold		Swing		

== See also ==
- 1980 United States Senate elections
