= Missouri's 15th Senate district =

American legislative district

Missouri's 15th State Senate district
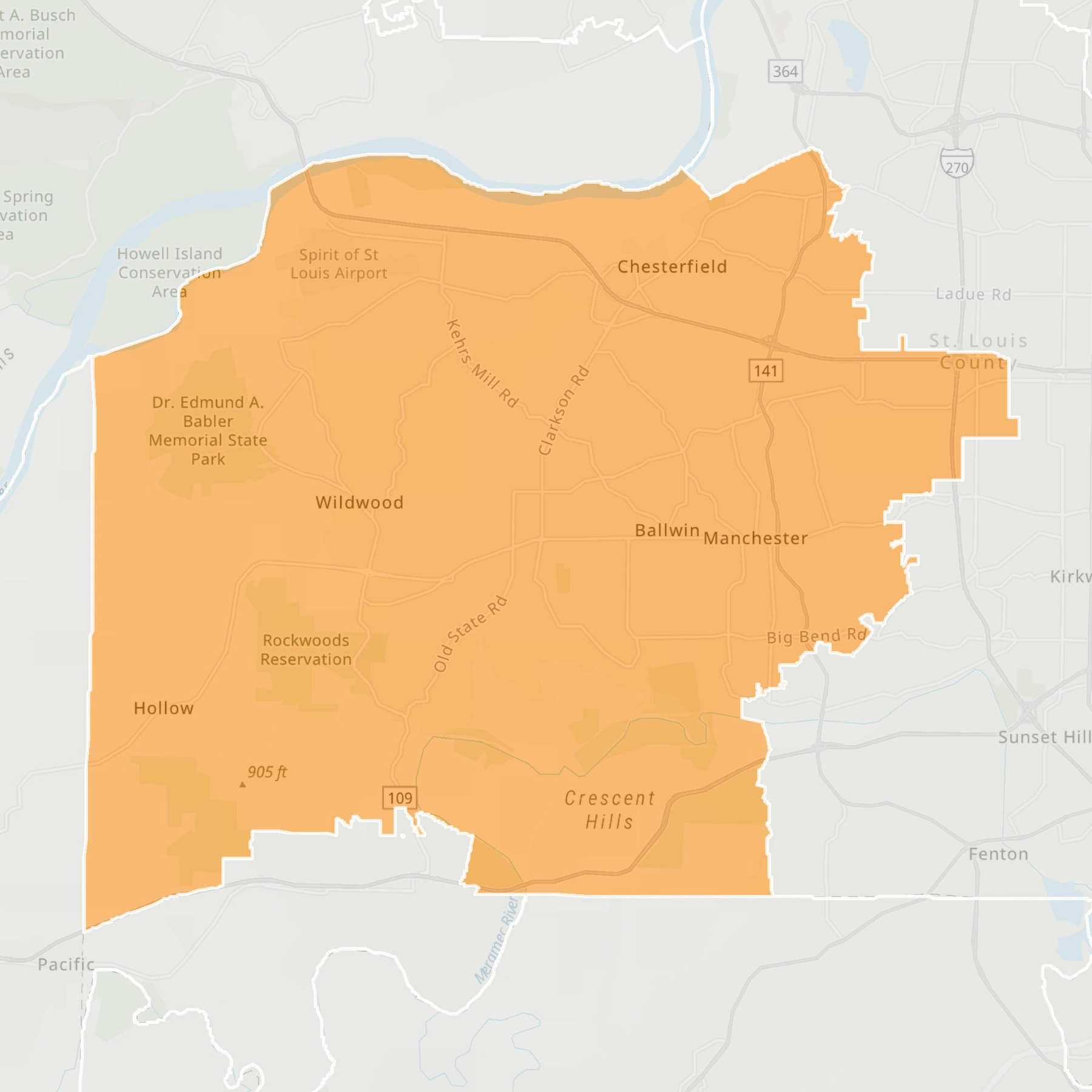
Senator
David Gregory; R–Chesterfield
- Demographics: 77% White; 2% Black; 4% Hispanic; 10% Asian; 6% Multiracial
- Population (2023): 184,408

Missouri's 15th Senatorial District is one of 34 districts in the Missouri Senate. The district has been represented by Republican David Gregory since 2025.

== Geography ==
The district is based in the St. Louis metropolitan area. The district is in southwestern St. Louis County, including the cities of Ballwin, Chesterfield, Ellisville, Manchester, Town & Country, and Wildwood. The district is also home to Maryville University, Missouri Botanical Garden's Sophia M. Sachs Butterfly House in Faust Park, and Castlewood State Park.

== Election results (1996–2024) ==
=== 1996 ===
Missouri's 15th Senatorial District election (1996)
Party	Candidate	Votes	%
Republican	Walt Mueller	45,049	57.63
Democratic	Patricia D. Gray	31,748	40.61
Libertarian	Matthew W. Peters	1,372	1.76
Total votes		78,169	100.00

=== 2000 ===
Missouri's 15th Senatorial District election (2000)
Party	Candidate	Votes	%
Republican	Michael R. Gibbons	49,823	59.41
Democratic	Marjorie M. Reinhart	34,045	40.59
Total votes		83,868	100.00
Republican hold			

=== 2004 ===
Missouri's 15th Senatorial District election (2004)
Party	Candidate	Votes	%
Republican	Michael R. Gibbons (incumbent)	48,876	51.90
Democratic	Jeanne Kirkton	43,647	46.35
Libertarian	Frank Gilmour	925	0.98
Green	Lydia Lewis	720	0.76
Total votes		94,168	100.00
Republican hold			

=== 2008 ===
Missouri's 15th Senatorial District election (2008)
Party	Candidate	Votes	%
Republican	Eric Schmitt	51,366	54.74
Democratic	James Trout	42,469	45.26
Total votes		93,835	100.00
Republican hold			

=== 2012 ===
Missouri's 15th Senatorial District election (2012)
Party	Candidate	Votes	%
Republican	Eric Schmitt (incumbent)	77,745	100.00
Total votes		77,745	100.00
Republican hold			

=== 2016 ===
Missouri's 15th Senatorial District election (2016)
Party	Candidate	Votes	%
Republican	Andrew Koenig	62,988	61.03
Democratic	Stephen Eagleton	40,193	38.94
Write-In	Richard Magee	33	0.03
Total votes		103,214	100.00
Republican hold			

=== 2020 ===
Missouri's 15th Senatorial District election (2020)
Party	Candidate	Votes	%
Republican	Andrew Koenig (incumbent)	61,172	53.99
Democratic	Deb Lavender	52,132	46.01
Total votes		113,304	100.00
Republican hold			

=== 2024 ===
Missouri's 15th Senatorial District election (2024)
Party	Candidate	Votes	%
Republican	David Gregory	56,093	51.62
Democratic	Joe Pereles	50,841	46.79
Libertarian	Jeff Coleman	1,733	1.60
Total votes		108,667	100.00
Republican hold			

== Statewide election results ==
Year	Office	Results
2008	President	McCain 59.1 – 40.1%
2012	President	Romney 64.6 – 35.4%
2016	President	Trump 55.2 – 40.0%
2016	Senate	Blunt 53.8 – 43.4%
2016	Governor	Greitens 56.0 – 41.7%
2018	Senate	Hawley 52.3 – 46.1%
2020	President	Trump 50.9 – 47.6%
2020	Governor	Parson 53.3 – 45.2%
