= 2024 in Missouri =

- Decades: 2000s; 2010s; 2020s
- See also: History of Missouri; Historical outline of Missouri; List of years in Missouri; 2024 in the United States

The following is a list of events of the year 2024 in Missouri, US.

== Incumbents ==
=== State government ===
- Governor: Mike Parson (R)

== Events ==
- February 14 – 2024 Kansas City parade shooting: One person is killed and 22 others are injured in a mass shooting during the Kansas City Chiefs' Super Bowl LVIII championship parade at Union Station in Kansas City. Three armed suspects are arrested at the scene.
- March 2 – Republican Party caucuses are held in Missouri for the 2024 United States presidential election. Former president Donald Trump wins all three contests.
- March 23 – Primary elections are held for the Democratic Party in Missouri.
- April 27 – Over a hundred people, including Green Party presidential candidate Jill Stein, are arrested while participating in a pro-Palestine protest at Washington University in St. Louis.
- May 24 – Two American Christian missionaries, one of them the daughter of a Missouri state representative, and a Haitian pastor are killed in a gang ambush in Port-au-Prince, Haiti.
- August 7 – Missouri Democratic congresswoman Cori Bush loses her primary election to St. Louis County prosecutor Wesley Bell, becoming the second member of the Squad to lose a primary.
- September 24 – Murder of Felicia Gayle: Marcellus Williams is executed by the state of Missouri shortly after the U.S. Supreme Court denies a request to delay the execution.
- November 5 – At least five people, including two election poll workers are killed by flash flooding in Missouri caused by torrential rain.

== See also ==
- 2024 in the United States
