= Lawrence K. Roos =

American politician

Lawrence Roos
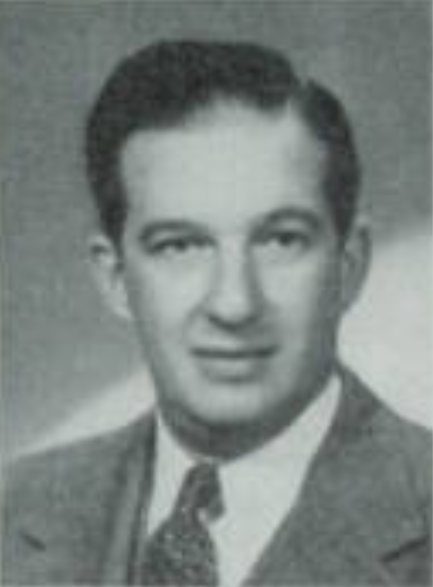

President of the Federal Reserve Bank of St. Louis
- In office March 22, 1976 – January 31, 1983
- Preceded by: Darryl Francis
- Succeeded by: Theodore Roberts

3rd County Executive of St. Louis County
- In office 1963–1975
- Preceded by: James McNary
- Succeeded by: Gene McNary

Personal details
- Born: February 1, 1918 St. Louis, Missouri, U.S.
- Died: September 23, 2005 (aged 87) St. Louis, Missouri, U.S.
- Party: Republican
- Education: Yale University (BA)

Lawrence Kalter Roos (February 1, 1918 – September 23, 2005) was an American banker and Republican from Missouri, United States.

== Early life ==
Roos was born in St. Louis, Missouri, on February 1, 1918. He attended Yale University, graduating in 1940, and served in the United States Army from 1941 to 1945. In the army, he served in the European Theatre, rising to the rank of major; he was awarded with a Bronze Star and five battle stars. After World War II, he worked in St. Louis for an advertising and public relations firm.

== Public career ==
Roos was first elected to public office in 1946, serving two terms (1947–1951) in the Missouri House of Representatives.

After several years out of politics, he was elected as St. Louis County Supervisor (now known as "St. Louis County Executive") in 1962. He would remain as county executive for three terms (1963–1975). While serving as county executive, he was the Republican nominee for Governor of Missouri in 1968. Although he won the Republican primary easily, he lost the general election to the incumbent governor, Warren E. Hearnes, by a margin of 61–39%.

Following his three terms as county executive, Roos was appointed first as vice president of the Federal Reserve Bank of St. Louis, and then on March 5, 1976, president of the bank. He would serve as president of the bank from March 1976 to January 31, 1983.

== Legacy ==
Roos died from stomach cancer in Barnes-Jewish Hospital in St. Louis on September 23, 2005, at the age of 87. The St. Louis County administrative office building in Clayton was named the Lawrence K. Roos Government Building in his honor.

Political offices
Preceded by James McNary	County Executive of St. Louis County; 1963–1975	Succeeded by Gene McNary
Party political offices
Preceded by Ethan A.H. Shepley	Republican nominee for Governor of Missouri; 1968	Succeeded by Kit Bond
Other offices
Preceded by Darryl Francis	President of the Federal Reserve Bank of St. Louis; 1976–1983	Succeeded by Theodore Roberts
