= Trish Gunby =

American politician

Member of the Missouri House of Representatives from the 99th district
- In office January 8, 2020 – January 4, 2023
- Preceded by: Jean Evans
- Succeeded by: Deb Lavender (redistricting)

Personal details
- Party: Democratic
- Education: University of Tulsa (BA)
- Website: Campaign website (archived)

Patricia Washburn Gunby is an American politician from the state of Missouri. A Democrat, she represented the 99th district in the Missouri House of Representatives from 2020 to 2023.

== Biography ==
Gunby earned a bachelor's degree in political science from the University of Tulsa. She won a special election to the Missouri House on November 5, 2019. On August 2, 2021, Gunby announced her plans to run for the congressional seat held by Ann Wagner. Gunby won the Democratic primary on August 2, 2022, but was defeated by Wagner in the general election on November 8.

Gunby is a resident of Ballwin, Missouri.

== Electoral history ==
=== State representative ===
Missouri House of Representatives special election, November 5, 2019, District 99
| Party | Candidate | Votes | % | ±% |
|---|---|---|---|---|
| Democratic | Trish Gunby | 3,357 | 54.04% | +7.05 |
| Republican | Lee Ann Pitman | 2,855 | 45.96% | −7.05 |

=== United States House of Representatives ===
2022 Election for U.S. Representative of Missouri's 2nd Congressional District
| Party | Candidate | Votes | % |
|---|---|---|---|
| Republican | Ann Wagner | 173,277 | 54.9 |
| Democratic | Trish Gunby | 135,895 | 43.0 |
| Libertarian | Bill Slantz | 6,494 | 2.1 |
| Total votes | | 315,666 | 100.00 |

Missouri House of Representatives
| Preceded by Jean Evans | Member of the Missouri House of Representatives from the 99th district 2020–2023 | Succeeded by Ian Mackey |
