= 2025 in Missouri =

- Decades: 2000s; 2010s; 2020s
- See also: History of Missouri; Historical outline of Missouri; List of years in Missouri; 2025 in the United States

The following is a list of events of the year 2025 in Missouri.

== Incumbents ==
=== State government ===
- Governor: Mike Parson (R) (until January 13), Mike Kehoe (R) (starting January 13)

== Events ==
- January 5 – Missouri is affected by the January 5–6, 2025 United States blizzard.
- April 8 – 2025 St. Louis mayoral election: Cara Spencer beats incumbent mayor Tishaura Jones in a rematch of the 2021 election.
- April 18 – 2025 Southwest United States measles outbreak: The Missouri Health Department confirms the state's first case of measles in 2025.
- May 16 – Seven people are killed by storms, including five in St. Louis County.
- May 27 – The Missouri Supreme Court orders a new ruling in a lower court decision related to the state's abortion ban. The state Supreme Court's decision effectively bans abortions in Missouri.
- June 14 – 2025 UFL championship game
- December 4 – An appeals court rules Missouri must reword Amendment 3, a proposed 2026 ballot measure that would ban most abortions in the state. A judge says the current wording falsely implies the measure would create new guarantees of access to reproductive healthcare.
- December 22 – The Kansas City Chiefs announce they will leave Arrowhead Stadium for a new stadium in the state of Kansas by 2031.

== See also ==
- 2025 in the United States
