= 2018 St. Louis County Executive election =

- November 6, 2018

Nominee	Steve Stenger	Paul Berry III
Party	Democratic	Republican
Popular vote	252,327	164,675
Percentage	57.02%	37.21%
County Executive before election
Steve Stenger
Democratic
Elected County Executive
Steve Stenger
Democratic

The 2018 St. Louis County Executive election took place on November 6, 2018. Incumbent County Executive Steve Stenger ran for re-election to a second term. He faced a difficult challenge from businessman Mark Mantovani in the Democratic primary, and won renomination with just 50.3 percent of the vote. In the general election, Stenger was opposed by Republican Paul Berry III, a political commentator and bail bondsman. In a contrast to Stenger's close election in 2014, he won re-election in a landslide, receiving 57 percent of the vote to Stenger's 37 percent. However, Stenger did not serve out his full term as County Executive, resigning in 2019 after being indicted for bribery and fraud.

== Democratic primary ==
=== Candidates ===
- Steve Stenger, incumbent County Executive
- Mark Mantovani, lawyer and businessman

=== Campaign ===
Mantovani, a lawyer and wealthy businessman, announced that he would challenge Stenger in the Democratic primary. Mantovani attacked Stenger for awarding government contracts to campaign contributors, and argued that his success in business would allow him to "chart a new future" for the county. Mantovani attracted the support of prominent Black Democratic leaders in the county, including those who endorsed Stenger's Republican opponent in 2014.

In seeking re-election, Stenger pointed to his success in "pursu[ing] a progressive agenda," generating economic growth, and creating jobs. He received the endorsement of the local police and firefighter unions. Stenger attacked Mantovani for his campaign contributions to Republican politicians, including former Missouri Governor Eric Greitens and former New York City Mayor Rudy Giuliani.

The St. Louis Post-Dispatch, which endorsed Stenger over Dooley in 2014, endorsed Mantovani. The paper sharply criticized Stenger's tenure as County Executive, noting that "vitriol and dysfunction . . . seem to follow St. Louis County Executive Steve Stenger wherever he goes." It noted that while Stenger had a "substantial list of accomplishments," many of which "yielded impressive results," they were accomplished by "bad judgment and [a] failure to cultivate personal relations." The Post-Dispatch praised Mantovani for having "the personality and executive-level management experience to put the county back onto a professional, businesslike track" and for having a "centrist philosophy that the county needs to unite its disparate political factions and win the cooperation of a Republican-led state Legislature and conservative business community."

Stenger narrowly defeated Mantovani, winning the primary by 1,100 votes. Mantovani initially refused to concede, citing issues at polling places, but ultimately conceded defeat following the certification of the results.

=== Results ===
Democratic primary results
Party	Candidate	Votes	%
Democratic	Steve Stenger (inc.)	92,070	50.30%
Democratic	Mark Mantovani	90,970	49.70%
Total votes		183,040	100.00%

== Republican primary ==
=== Candidates ===
- Paul Berry III, bail bondsman and political commentator
- Daniel Sampson, former county employee

=== Results ===
Republican primary results
Party	Candidate	Votes	%
Republican	Paul Berry III	32,109	56.47%
Republican	Daniel Sampson	24,755	43.53%
Total votes		56,864	100.00%

== Libertarian primary ==
=== Candidates ===
- Nick Kasoff, IT consultant

=== Results ===
Libertarian primary results
Party	Candidate	Votes	%
Libertarian	Nick Kasoff	1,117	100.00%
Total votes		1,117	100.00%

== Constitution Party primary ==
=== Candidates ===
- Andrew Ostrowski, cleaning services franchise owner

=== Results ===
Constitution Party primary results
Party	Candidate	Votes	%
Constitution	Andrew Ostrowski	180	100.00%
Total votes		180	100.00%

== General election ==
=== Results ===
2018 St. Louis County Executive election
Party	Candidate	Votes	%
Democratic	Steve Stenger (inc.)	252,327	57.02%
Republican	Paul Berry III	164,675	37.21%
Libertarian	Nick Kasoff	17,147	3.87%
Constitution	Andrew Ostrowski	4,537	1.11%
Write-in		3,858	0.87%
Total votes		442,544	100.00%
Democratic hold			
