= David Gregory (politician) =

Missouri politician

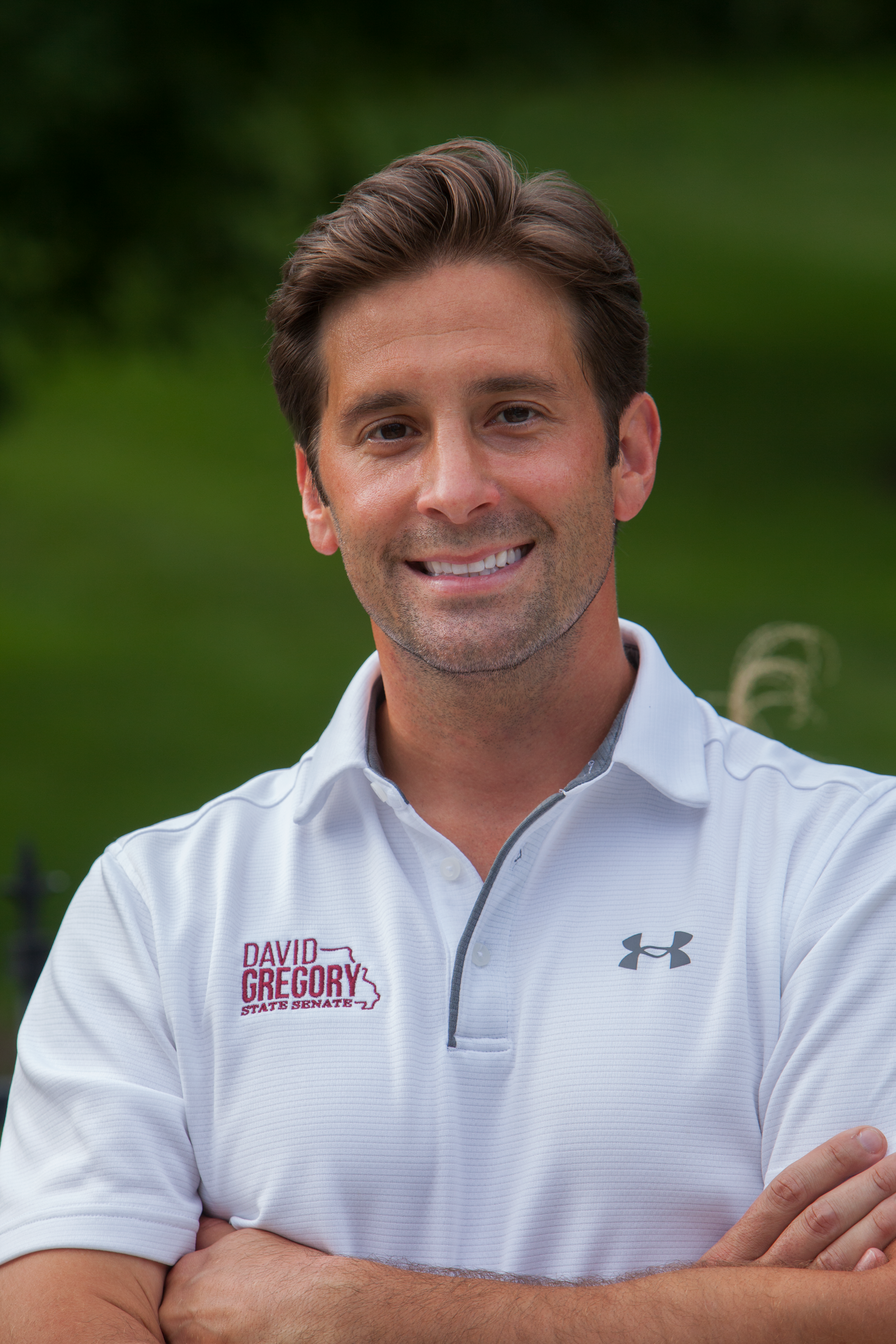

Member of the Missouri Senate from the 15th district
- Incumbent
- Assumed office January 8, 2025
- Preceded by: Andrew Koenig

Member of the Missouri House of Representatives from the 96th district
- In office January 3, 2017 – January 4, 2023
- Preceded by: Mike Leara
- Succeeded by: Brad Christ

Personal details
- Party: Republican

David Gregory is a Missouri politician and litigation attorney, who first represented the 96th district in the Missouri House of Representatives from 2017 to 2023. He is a Missouri senator representing District 15. He is the founder of The Injury Counsel, a law firm based out of St. Louis, Missouri.

== Political career ==
=== Missouri House of Representatives ===
Gregory was elected to the Missouri House of Representatives in 2016, representing the 96th District which covers South St. Louis County. Throughout his career, he was endorsed by the Missouri Fraternal Order of Police and other notable individuals like David Steward and professional athletes like Ozzie Smith, Bernie Federko, Deron Cherry and Neil Smith.

In his first term as State Representative, David audited the Department of Revenue and found $36 million in potential savings for Missouri taxpayers. To implement his findings, the then Director of the Department of Revenue, Ken Zellers created an ongoing initiative called, Strike Force Gregory. He was named Freshman Legislator of the Year for outstanding work on preventing government waste, fraud and abuse.

In 2019, Gregory co-sponsored the bill that ended abortion in Missouri.

In 2021, he announced his intentions to investigate ways to counter anti-competitive practices in the meat-packing industry that negatively impact Missouri cattlemen.

=== Missouri Senate ===
Gregory was elected to the Missouri Senate in 2024, representing the 15th District which covers west St. Louis County.

In December 2024 Gregory pre-filed a bill that would create the Missouri state felony of trespassing for any illegal alien who knowingly enters and remains in the state, punishable by imprisonment for life, and authorizing bounty hunters to enforce federal immigration policy. Gregory stated that the bill essentially creates a state ICE program to force cooperation with ICE. President of the Missouri NAACP, Nimrod Chapel, called the bill "draconian and racist" while executive director of Revolución Educativa, Edgar Palacios, called it "horrendous". House Republicans did not present a corresponding bill and Speaker Jon Patterson expressed a "lack of enthusiasm" for a bounty proposal, saying that the issue is being addressed at the federal level.

=== Committee assignments (past) ===
- Judiciary, Chairman
- Budget
- Special Committee on Government Accountability, Chairman
- Rules, Administrative Oversight

== Elections ==
=== Auditor ===
Gregory was a contender for the 2022 Missouri State Auditor Election.

=== Missouri Senate ===
Gregory is a candidate for Missouri Senate in the 15th district. He won a three way Republican primary with expenditures around $450,000.

Historical preservationists and his Democratic opponent criticized Gregory's plans to tear down at least one historic building in Jefferson City to build "Paige's Castle" as a second home with Airbnb accommodations.

In October, Gregory demanded television stations stop airing an attack ad that claimed Gregory wrote Missouri's abortion ban. Gregory and state Senator Nick Schroer, the writer of the legislation, denied that Gregory wrote the legislation.

== Electoral history ==
2016 Missouri House of Representative District 96 Republican Primary
Party	Candidate	Votes	%	±%
Republican	David J Gregory	3,944	62.5%	
Republican	Dan Reuter	2,366	37.5%	

2016 Missouri House of Representative District 96 Election
Party	Candidate	Votes	%	±%
Republican	David J Gregory	18,166	100.0%	

Ran unopposed

2018 Missouri House of Representative District 96 Republican Primary
Party	Candidate	Votes	%	±%
Republican	David J. Gregory	4,427	100.0%	

Ran unopposed

2018 Missouri House of Representative District 96 Election
Party	Candidate	Votes	%	±%
Republican	David Gregory	12,071	58.8%	
Democratic	Erica Hoffman	8,458	41.2%	

2020 Missouri House of Representative District 96 Republican Primary
Party	Candidate	Votes	%	±%
Republican	David J. Gregory	3,909	100.0%	

Ran unopposed

2020 Missouri House of Representative District 96 Election
Party	Candidate	Votes	%	±%
Republican	David Gregory	14,180	59.9%	
Democratic	Erica Hoffman	9,475	40.1%	

2022 Missouri State Auditor Republican Primary
Party	Candidate	Votes	%	±%
Republican	Scott Fitzpatrick	378,915	64.7%	
Republican	David Gregory	206,868	35.3%	

2024 Missouri Senate District 15 Republican Primary
Party	Candidate	Votes	%	±%
Republican	David Gregory	9,099	40.7%	
Republican	Mark A. Harder	7,628	34.2%	
Republican	Jim Bowlin	5,607	25.1%	

2024 Missouri Senate District 15 Election
Party	Candidate	Votes	%	±%
Republican	David Gregory	56,093	51.6%	
Democratic	Joe Pereles	50,841	46.8%	
Libertarian	Jeff Coleman	1,733	1.6%	

== Legal career ==
Gregory is a conservative lawyer and litigation attorney in multiple states with his headquarters in St. Louis, Missouri. He is the founder of The Injury Counsel law firm. He has represented MLB & NHL players, professional fighters, corporations and other notable public figures.

In 2019, he won a business fraud lawsuit with a $1.63 million jury verdict, and, in 2021, an animal abuse case for $1.3 million.

In 2020, Gregory was among a group of attorneys who represented Church of the Word, a non-denominational Christian church, which had sued County Executive Sam Page and acting St. Louis County Health Department Director Dr. Emily Doucette over restrictions related to COVID-19. The lawsuit was dismissed as moot by the U.S. District Court in St. Louis as the City had already updated its COVID guidelines to allow religious services to be held with social distancing practices and a limit of 25% of the capacity allowed under a church’s fire code.

In 2024, he sued Page on behalf of seniors to enforce a Senior Property Tax Freeze program.

Gregory has been selected to Super Lawyers’ Rising Stars. He is a member of The Million Dollar Advocates Forum and America’s Top 100 Attorneys.

== Life and education ==
David is a lifelong Missourian and he lives in Chesterfield with his wife, Paige. He has an accounting degree, a Masters of Business Administration, and a Juris Doctor from Saint Louis University.
