= H. C. Milford =

American insurance executive and politician from Missouri (1932–2018)

5th County Executive of St. Louis County
- In office October 25, 1989 – January 1, 1991
- Preceded by: Gene McNary
- Succeeded by: Buzz Westfall

Personal details
- Born: January 27, 1932 St. Louis, Missouri, U.S.
- Died: April 30, 2018 (aged 86) St. Louis, Missouri, U.S.
- Party: Republican
- Spouse: Emily Tinker Milford
- Children: Daniel, Douglas, Diane, Henry, Janet, Jody
- Profession: Insurance

H. C. Milford (January 27, 1932 – April 30, 2018) was an American insurance executive and volunteer when he entered politics. First, serving on the St. Louis County planning commission, then as a St. Louis County Councilman for almost 4 terms, He was also a financial consultant, and Republican politician from Missouri. He grew up in Shrewsbury, Missouri, attended South Side Catholic and Webster Groves High School and the University of Missouri – Columbia. He served in the Air Force from 1954 until 1958. He started an Insurance brokerage with his older brother, Doug Milford.

Milford died on April 30, 2018, at the age of 86.

== Political career ==
Milford became St. Louis County Executive on October 25, 1989 when Gene McNary, serving his fourth term in the position was appointed Commissioner of the Immigration and Naturalization Service by President George H. W. Bush.

As county executive, Milford proposed that St. Louis International Airport be run by an independent authority, rather than the City of St. Louis. Little more than a year into his role as county executive, Milford decided to stand for re-election in November 1990. He was defeated by the Democratic nominee, Buzz Westfall, by a margin of 55–45%. This defeat ended 28 years of Republican control of the government of St. Louis County, and, as of 2025, made Milford the last Republican to lead the county.

== Redevelopment career ==
Following his defeat, Milford volunteered to serve as economic development director, and financial consultant for economically depressed East St. Louis, Illinois. Working with newly elected East St. Louis mayor Gordon Bush, Milford lent credibility to several re-development projects and thus helped to attract wary investors to the city. Of the re-development projects he was involved in, the most visible is the Casino Queen, a riverboat casino on the East St. Louis waterfront of the Mississippi River, and at the time of its construction, a sorely needed source of revenue for the city. Milford continued to work to improve East St. Louis until at least 2003, commuting there from his home in Webster Groves, Missouri.

== Electoral history ==
1990 Election for County Executive of St. Louis County
Party	Candidate	Votes	%	±%
Republican	H. C. Milford	144,949	45.4	
Democratic	Buzz Westfall	174,099	54.6	

Political offices
Preceded by Gene McNary	County Executive of St. Louis County; 1989–1991	Succeeded by Buzz Westfall
