= 2010 St. Louis County Executive election =

- November 2, 2010
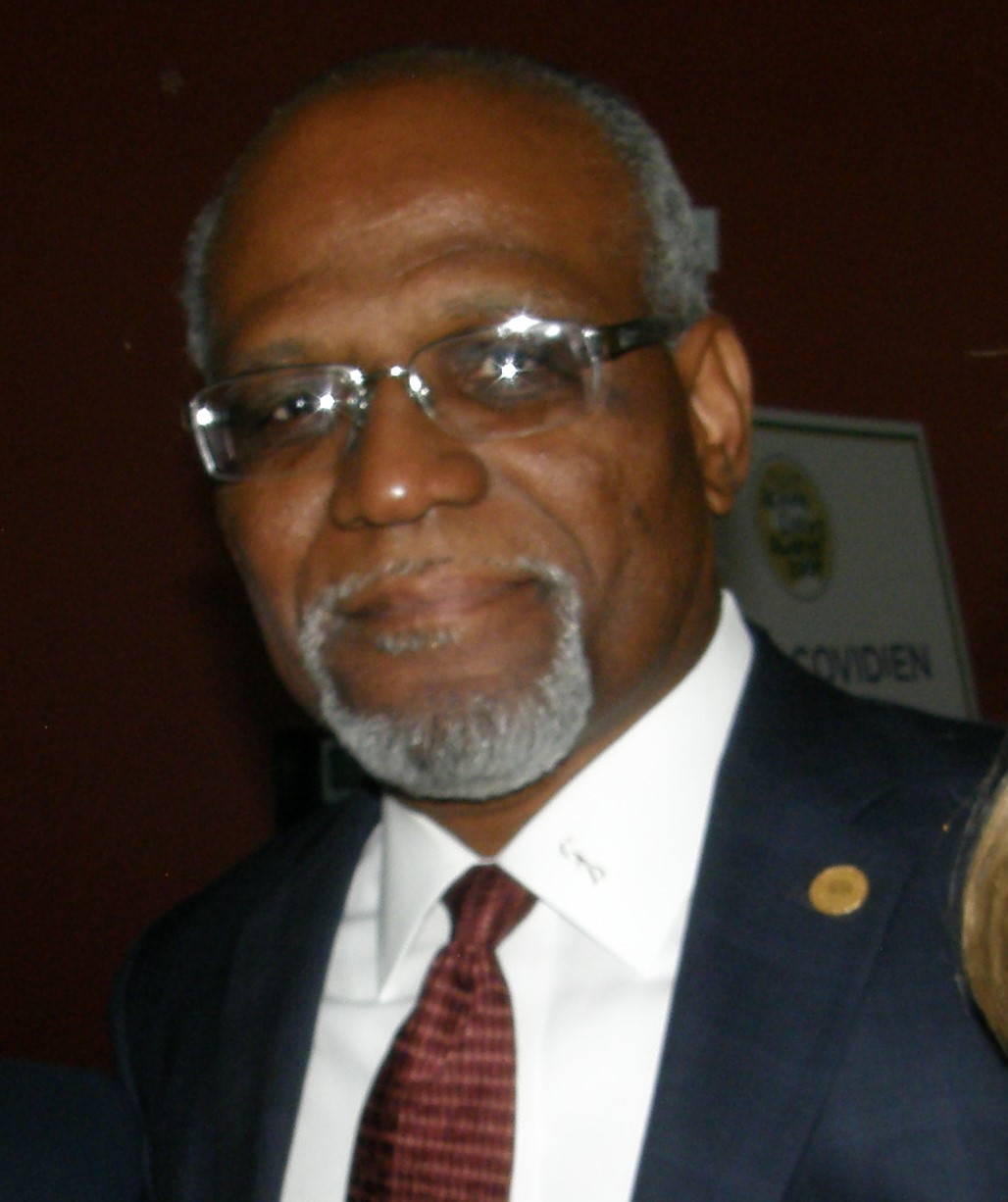

Nominee	Charlie Dooley	Bill Corrigan
Party	Democratic	Republican
Popular vote	191,222	175,025
Percentage	51.05%	46.72%
County Executive before election
Charlie Dooley
Democratic
Elected County Executive
Charlie Dooley
Democratic

The 2010 St. Louis County Executive election took place on November 2, 2010. Incumbent County Executive Charlie Dooley ran for re-election to a second full term. He won the Democratic primary by a closer margin than expected, and faced attorney Bill Corrigan, the Republican nominee, in the general election. Corrigan attacked Dooley over high county property tax rates, while Dooley emphasized his experience in managing the county through the economic crisis. Dooley ended up defeating Corrigan to win re-election, receiving 51 percent of the vote to Corrigan's 47 percent.

== Democratic primary ==
=== Candidates ===
- Charlie Dooley, incumbent County Executive
- Ronald E. Levy, retired typographer, former member of the Bayless School District

=== Results ===
Democratic primary results
Party	Candidate	Votes	%
Democratic	Charlie Dooley (inc.)	47,916	75.82%
Democratic	Ronald E. Levy	15,278	24.18%
Total votes		63,194	100.00%

== Republican primary ==
=== Candidates ===
- Bill Corrigan, attorney
- Nick Farace, retired engineer

=== Results ===
Republican primary results
Party	Candidate	Votes	%
Republican	Bill Corrigan	66,288	88.56%
Republican	Nick Farace	8,565	11.44%
Total votes		74,853	100.00%

== Libertarian primary ==
=== Candidates ===
- Ted Brown, 2006 Libertarian nominee for County Executive

=== Results ===
Libertarian primary results
Party	Candidate	Votes	%
Libertarian	Ted Brown	752	100.00%
Total votes		752	100.00%

== General election ==
=== Polling ===
Poll source	Date(s) administered	Sample size (Note: Key: A – all adults RV – registered voters LV – likely voters V – unclear)	Margin of error	Charlie Dooley (D)	Bill Corrigan (R)	Other / Undecided
Hamilton Campaigns	June 21, 2010	550 (LV)	± 4.4%	53%	38%	9%
Tarrance Group	August 4–5, 2010	300 (RV)	± 5.8%	46%	43%	11%

=== Results ===
2010 St. Louis County Executive election
Party	Candidate	Votes	%
Democratic	Charlie Dooley (inc.)	191,222	51.05%
Republican	Bill Corrigan	175,025	46.72%
Libertarian	Ted Brown	8,125	2.17%
Write-in		214	0.06%
Total votes		374,586	100.00%
Democratic hold			
