= Andrew Koenig (politician) =

American politician

Member of the Missouri Senate from the 15th district
- In office January 4, 2017 – January 8, 2025
- Preceded by: Eric Schmitt
- Succeeded by: David Gregory

Member of the Missouri House of Representatives from the 99th district
- In office January 9, 2013 – January 4, 2017
- Preceded by: Mike Sutherland
- Succeeded by: Jean Evans

Member of the Missouri House of Representatives from the 88th district
- In office January 7, 2009 – January 9, 2013
- Preceded by: Neal St. Onge
- Succeeded by: Jill Schupp

Personal details
- Born: Andrew P. Koenig; December 21, 1982 (age 43)
- Party: Republican
- Spouse: Brooke Koenig
- Children: 5
- Education: Lindenwood University
- Occupation: Politician; small business owner; insurance adjuster
- Website: electandrewkoenig.com

Andrew P. Koenig (born December 21, 1982) is an American politician who has served in the Missouri Senate since 2017. Koenig, a Republican, is a former member of the Missouri House of Representatives and a small business owner. From 2009 to 2012, he represented the 88th district of Missouri. From 2013 to 2017, he represented the 99th district, which includes Manchester, Twin Oaks, Valley Park, and parts of Fenton. Koenig was elected to serve as the State Senator from the 15th district in 2016 and re-elected in 2020.

== Personal life ==
Koenig graduated from Marquette High School, which is in Clarkson Valley, in 2001. He later went to Lindenwood University with a scholarship in cross country. He majored in Business Administration and minored in philosophy.

He has co-owned a paint company with his father since 1997. He is also the owner of a construction company which focuses on roofing and painting. In addition, he is a licensed insurance adjuster.

== Political career ==
In 2008, after winning his primary, Koenig ran unopposed to represent the 88th district in the Missouri House of Representatives. In his 2010 reelection campaign, he again won his primary and ran opposed in the general election. In 2010, he was one of 35 state representatives to sign a "no new taxes" pledge. In both 2012 and 2014, Koenig maintained his seat by defeating Democrat William Pinkston in the general election. In 2016, he was elected as State Senator from the 15th District, defeating Democrat Stephen Eagleton in the general election 61.1% to 38.9%.

He was a member of the Missouri Freedom Caucus.

=== Committee assignments ===
- Education (Chairman 2023–2024)
- Health and Pensions (Vice-Chairman)
- Judiciary and Civil and Criminal Jurisprudence
- Seniors, Families and Children
- Small Business and Industry
- Ways and Means (Chairman)
- Joint Committee on Child Abuse and Neglect
- Joint Committee on Education
- Joint Committee on Public Employee Retirement (Vice-Chairman)
- Joint Committee on Tax Policy

=== Promotion of creationism in schools ===
In 2015, Koenig sponsored a bill, HB 486, that proposed allowing teachers the freedom to introduce "differences of opinion about controversial issues, including biological and chemical evolution." The bill did not pass committee.

According to the National Center for Science Education, Koenig was also the sponsor of similar bills: HB 195 in 2011, HB 1276 in 2012, HB 179 in 2013, and HB 1587 in 2014. All of those bills failed. He cosponsored HB 1227 in 2012 and HB 291 in 2013, which would require public schools, including introductory courses at colleges and universities, to teach intelligent design in equal measure to evolution; both failed. Koenig also cosponsored HB 1472 in 2013, which would require schools to notify parents if they had "instruction relating to the theory of evolution by natural selection".

== Electoral history ==
=== State Senate ===
2020 General Election for Missouri's 15th Senate District
Party	Candidate	Votes	%	±%
Republican	Andrew Koenig	61,172	53.99	−7.06
Democratic	Deb Lavender	52,132	46.01	+7.06

2016 General Election for Missouri's 15th Senate District
Party	Candidate	Votes	%	±%
Republican	Andrew Koenig	62,988	61.05	
Democratic	Stephen Eagleton	40,193	38.95	

=== State representative ===
2014 General Election for Missouri's 99th District House of Representatives
Party	Candidate	Votes	%	±%
Republican	Andrew Koenig	6,961	63.53	+4.31
Democratic	William Pinkston	3,996	36.47	−4.31

2012 General Election for Missouri's 99th District House of Representatives
Party	Candidate	Votes	%	±%
Republican	Andrew Koenig	10,755	59.22	
Democratic	William Pinkston	7,405	40.78	

2010 General Election for Missouri's 88th District House of Representatives
Party	Candidate	Votes	%	±%
Republican	Andrew Koenig	10,582	100.0	

2010 Republican Primary Election for Missouri's 88th District House of Representatives
Party	Candidate	Votes	%	±%
Republican	Andrew Koenig	3,984	88.42	+43.98
Republican	Bryan Myer	522	11.58	N/A

2008 General Election for Missouri's 88th District House of Representatives
Party	Candidate	Votes	%	±%
Republican	Andrew Koenig	14,814	100.00	N/A

2008 Republican Primary Election for Missouri's 88th District House of Representatives
Party	Candidate	Votes	%	±%
Republican	Andrew Koenig	1,750	44.44	N/A
Republican	Shamed Dogan	1,317	33.44	N/A
Republican	Chris Howard	871	22.12	N/A
