= Jean Evans (politician) =

American politician

Member of the Missouri House of Representatives from the 99th district
- In office January 4, 2017 – February 5, 2019
- Preceded by: Andrew Koenig
- Succeeded by: Trish Gunby

Personal details
- Born: July 24, 1966 (age 60) Killeen, Texas
- Party: Republican

Jean Evans (born July 24, 1966) is an American politician who served in the Missouri House of Representatives from the 99th district from 2017 to 2019. In 2025 she was state director for the Missouri Federation for Children, a group advocating for School Choice.

She was born in Ft. Hood, Texas. After attending Westminster Christian Academy in Chesterfield, Missouri, she completed a BA at the University of Missouri in St. Louis.

She served as Executive Director of the Missouri Republican Party.
