= 1998 St. Louis County Executive election =

- November 3, 1998

Nominee	Buzz Westfall	Joe Passanise
Party	Democratic	Republican
Popular vote	203,692	123,828
Percentage	60.88%	37.01%
County Executive before election
Buzz Westfall
Democratic
Elected County Executive
Buzz Westfall
Democratic

The 1998 St. Louis County Executive election took place on November 3, 1998. Incumbent Democratic County Executive Buzz Westfall ran for re-election to a third term. Though local Republicans attempted to recruit a well-known challenger to Westfall, he faced minimal opposition. He won the Democratic primary and then was opposed by Republican Joe Passanise, a retired county engineer, in the general election. Westfall defeated Passanise in a landslide, winning his third term with 61 percent of the vote.

== Democratic primary ==
=== Candidates ===
- Buzz Westfall, incumbent County Executive
- John Hogan, perennial candidate
- Joe Mondrak, activist

=== Results ===
Democratic primary results
Party	Candidate	Votes	%
Democratic	Buzz Westfall (inc.)	25,671	77.31%
Democratic	John Hogan	5,700	17.17%
Democratic	Joe Mondrak	1,834	5.52%
Total votes		33,205	100.00%

== Republican primary ==
=== Candidates ===
- Joe Passanise, retired engineer
- Ben Murphy, businessman
- Robert J. Crump, convenience store manager
- Anthony B. Geyer, retired county planner
- Mike Kontominas, computer professional

==== Declined ====
- Edith Cunnane, Couty Councilwoman
- Franc Flotron, State Senator
- Gene McNary, former County Executive, former Commissioner of the U.S. Immigration and Naturalization Service

=== Results ===
Republican primary results
Party	Candidate	Votes	%
Republican	Joe Passanise	13,562	40.75%
Republican	Ben Murphy	7,288	21.90%
Republican	Robert J. Crump	6,090	18.30%
Republican	Anthony B. Geyer	3,590	10.79%
Republican	Mike Kontominas	2,752	8.27%
Total votes		33,282	100.00%

== Libertarian primary ==
=== Candidates ===
- James E. Higgins, computer systems analyst

=== Results ===
Libertarian primary results
Party	Candidate	Votes	%
Libertarian	James E. Higgins	250	100.00%
Total votes		250	100.00%

== General election ==
=== Results ===
1998 St. Louis County Executive election
Party	Candidate	Votes	%
Democratic	Buzz Westfall (inc.)	203,692	60.88%
Republican	Joe Passanise	84,087	31.52%
Libertarian	James E. Higgins	7,080	2.12%
Total votes		334,600	100.00%
Democratic hold			
