= Shamed Dogan =

American politician

Member of the Missouri House of Representatives from the 98th district
- In office 2015–2023
- Preceded by: Dwight Scharnhorst
- Succeeded by: Deb Lavender

Personal details
- Born: August 28, 1978 (age 48)
- Party: Republican
- Spouse: Sara
- Children: 2
- Education: Yale University

Shamed Dogan (born August 28, 1978) is an American politician. He is a former Republican member of the Missouri House of Representatives, representing the 98th District in St. Louis County. His district included parts of Ballwin, Ellisville, Fenton, and Wildwood. Dogan was first elected in November 2014.

As of 2018, Dogan was the only black Republican serving in the Missouri state legislature.

== Education ==
A 1996 graduate of Mary Institute and St. Louis Country Day School, Dogan received his bachelor's degree from Yale University in 2000 in political science.

== Career ==
After graduating from college, Dogan moved to Washington, D.C., and began working for the Black America's Political Action Committee. From 2001 to 2002, he worked for the National Republican Senatorial Committee. Dogan served for three years as a legislative assistant to U.S. Senator Jim Talent. During his time working for Talent, he helped write federal "Pass with Care" legislation and advised Talent on issues including transportation, immigration, and energy issues. In 2006, Dogan was hired as the deputy coalitions director of the Missouri Republican Party.

Prior to his legislative tenure, Dogan served from 2011 to 2014 as an alderman representing Ballwin's 2nd Ward, and also worked as a fundraiser for Washington University in St. Louis. In 2021, local media reports indicated Dogan was interested in running for the position of St. Louis County Executive.

During the 2016 Republican presidential primary, Dogan indicated he would vote third party if Donald Trump was selected as the party's nominee, which he eventually was. Following the 2021 storming of the United States Capitol, Dogan again condemned Trump, and stated that the "Republican Party needs to get back to its roots and get away from being a cult around the personality of Donald J. Trump".

== Personal life ==
Dogan lives in Ballwin with his wife Sara and their two children.

He is a board member for the Epworth Children & Family Services. He is a former board member of the Epilepsy Foundation of Missouri & Kansas, the St. Louis Area Young Republicans, and the West St. Louis County Jaycees.
