= Gene McNary =

American politician (born 1935)

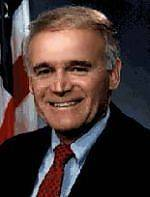

Commissioner of the Immigration and Naturalization Service
- In office October 26, 1989 – January 20, 1993
- President: George H. W. Bush
- Preceded by: Alan C. Nelson
- Succeeded by: Doris Meissner

4th Executive of St. Louis County
- In office 1975–1989
- Preceded by: Lawrence K. Roos
- Succeeded by: H. C. Milford

Personal details
- Born: September 14, 1935 (age 91) Muncie, Indiana, US
- Party: Republican
- Spouse: Susan McNary
- Children: Cole
- Education: Indiana University, Bloomington (BA, LLB)

Gene McNary (born September 14, 1935) is an American politician. He has served as the commissioner of the Immigration and Naturalization Service, executive director of the Missouri Gaming Commission, and county executive of St. Louis County. He has also been a Republican candidate for governor and senator in Missouri.

== Early life, education, and career ==
McNary was born September 14, 1935, in Muncie, Indiana. His father was and oil jobber and his mother worked with him. McNary earned a Bachelor of Science in finance in 1957 and a law degree in 1960 from Indiana University Bloomington. After law school McNary decided to move to St. Louis, where he joined the Lashly, Lashly & Miller law firm. He served in the United States Army from 1960 to 1961 and Army Reserves from 1961 to 1966. He became a private first class.

== Early political career ==
In 1963, McNary began his career as a public servant by becoming assistant public defender. In 1966, he decided to run for Prosecuting Attorney of St. Louis County. He won the election and then went on to win reelection. He then ran for County Executive of St. Louis County and won four terms in that position. As county executive, he helped create a regional arts commission, merge the county and city hospitals into one regional facility, and create a regional convention and visitors bureau. At the time he also served as the chairman of the East-West Gateway Coordinating Council.

In 1980, McNary was the Republican nominee for Senator. He narrowly lost to incumbent Senator Thomas Eagleton with a 52.0% to a 47.2% margin. In 1984, McNary lost the Republican primary for Governor to Attorney General John Ashcroft. In 1989, McNary was appointed Commissioner of the Immigration and Naturalization Service by President George H. W. Bush. He stayed in that position for over 3 years.

== Private practice and later political career ==
In 1994, McNary went back to St. Louis and joined the Danna law firm. In 1998, he formed a law firm, McNary, Morris & Smalley, that specialized in immigration. While in private practice, he decided to run to represent Missouri's 2nd congressional district in the United States House of Representatives. The seat was open because the incumbent, Jim Talent, decided to run for governor. He narrowly lost the Republican primary to Todd Akin by about 50 votes. In 2004, McNary ran to become St. Louis County Executive, a position vacated by Buzz Westfall's death. He lost to Charlie Dooley with a margin of 45.8% to 52.9%.

In 2006, Governor Matt Blunt appointed McNary the Executive Director of the Missouri Gaming Commission from January 2006 to July 1, 2010, preceded by acting ED Steve Johnson and succeeded by Roger Stottlemyre. McNary was in that position while St. Louis got two new casinos and while the $500 loss limit was ended. McNary left his job at the Missouri Gaming Commission when two new Democratic appointees made it possible for him to be removed from his post. He then ran for assessor of St. Louis County in 2012. The Republican Central Committee of St. Louis County chose L. K. "Chip" Wood as the Republican nominee for the position, in a 23–21 vote. McNary has five children and nine grandchildren. One of his children is former Missouri State Rep. Cole McNary.

== Electoral history ==
2004 Special Election for County Executive of St. Louis County
Party	Candidate	Votes	%	±%
Republican	Gene McNary	242,903	45.8	
Democratic	Charlie Dooley	280,520	52.9	
Libertarian	Theo. "Ted" Brown Sr.	6,879	1.3	

United States Senate election in Missouri, 1980
Party	Candidate	Votes	%	±%
Republican	Gene McNary		47.7	
Democratic	Thomas Eagleton		52.0	
Socialist Workers	Martha Pettit		0.3	

Political offices
Preceded by Lawrence K. Roos	Executive of St. Louis County; 1975–1989	Succeeded by H. C. Milford
Preceded by Alan C. Nelson	Commissioner of the Immigration and Naturalization Service; 1989–1993	Succeeded by Doris Meissner
Party political offices
Preceded by Thomas B. Curtis	Republican nominee for U.S. Senator from Missouri (Class 3); 1980	Succeeded by Kit Bond
