= Missouri Green Party =

- Chairperson: Paul Lehmann
- Secretary: Austin Brown
- Founded: November 7, 2002
- Ideology: Green politics; Anti-capitalism; Left-wing populism; Progressivism
- Colors: Green

The Missouri Green Party (formerly the Progressive Party of Missouri), is the branch of the Green Party of the United States operating in the state of Missouri since its founding in 2001. Much like its federal counterpart, it promotes the ideology of green politics, particularly environmentalism, nonviolence, participatory democracy, social justice and anti-war. The party has since run at for election at all three levels of government.

== Presidential Nominee Results ==
Year	Nominee	Votes	%	Source
1996	Ralph Nader (write-in)	534	0.02	
2000	Ralph Nader	38,515	1.63	
2008	Cynthia McKinney	80	0	
2016	Jill Stein	25,056	0.9	
2020	Howie Hawkins	8,283	0.3	
2024	Jill Stein	17,135	0.6	
