= 2023 in Missouri =

- Decades: 2000s; 2010s; 2020s
- See also: History of Missouri; Historical outline of Missouri; List of years in Missouri; 2023 in the United States

The following is a list of events of the year 2023 in Missouri.

== Incumbents ==
=== State government ===
- Governor: Mike Parson (R)

== Events ==
- April 5 – At least five people are killed and many others are injured when a tornado strikes Glen Allen and Marble Hill.
- April 29 – The final day of the 2023 NFL draft is held in Kansas City.

== See also ==
- 2023 in the United States
