= Rick Stream =

American politician

Member of the Missouri House of Representatives from the 90th district
- In office 2013–2015
- Preceded by: John McCaherty
- Succeeded by: Deb Lavender

Member of the Missouri House of Representatives from the 94th district
- In office 2007–2013
- Preceded by: Jane Bogetto
- Succeeded by: Vicki Englund

Personal details
- Born: February 23, 1949 (age 77) St. Louis, Missouri
- Party: Republican
- Education: St. Louis Community College; University of Missouri
- Occupation: Project manager Politician

Rick Stream (born February 23, 1949) is an American Christian, a former U.S. Naval Officer, a former budget/project manager for the United States Department of Defense and a former Republican member of the Missouri House of Representatives. He served in the Missouri House from 2007 to 2014 representing Kirkwood and surrounding communities in the 94th and 90th districts. He was chairman and vice-chairman of the House Budget Committee for the last six years. Currently, he is the Republican Director of Elections in St. Louis County.

== Early life and career ==
Rick Stream is a native of Kirkwood, MO. He is the second oldest of 8 children and began working outside the home at age 10; cutting grass, shoveling snow and babysitting. In 1963, Rick's father died at the age of 42. Rick was 14 and his youngest sibling, his sister, was just 9 months old. Rick's family had no insurance or income so Rick painted 4 houses when he was 15, and then went to work in the laboratory at St. Joseph Hospital in Kirkwood (where Aberdeen Heights is now). He worked there 7 years, through high school and college. He graduated from Kirkwood High School in 1967. He then went to St. Louis Community College–Meramec where he obtained an Associate degree in business. He also received a Bachelor of Science in Business Administration from University of Missouri–St. Louis in 1971. He then served as an officer in the United States Navy from 1971 to 1975, serving on the USS Fort Snelling (LSD-30) as the Navigator, Admin and Personnel Officer and Legal Officer. He received his Honorable Discharge in Dec. 1975 and 3 months later was married to Ellen Taylor, who he met through a mutual friend while in the Navy. Rick worked for one year at Absorbent Cotton Company in Valley Park as the midnight supervisor. In 1977, he started his career at the United States Department of Defense in St. Louis where he was a budget and project manager with the Army Aviation and Logistics Commands. During that time he was elected 4 times to the Kirkwood School Board. In 2006, he retired early to run for MO State Representative, serving four terms. In 2014, Stream ran for St. Louis County Executive, losing to Steve Stenger by 6/10% (1800 votes). He worked two years as the executive director of Hope Unlimited, a Christian ministry which works with children in Meacham Park. He began his current job at the Election Board in January 2017. In 2018, Stream received the Lifetime Achievement Award from the Kirkwood/Des Peres Chamber of Commerce. In 2019, he was inducted into the Kirkwood High School Alumni Hall of Fame for his 50+ years of volunteer service to the school district and the community. Stream has been married since 1976, has four children and four grandchildren, and attends Greentree Community Church in Kirkwood.

== Political career ==
Rick Stream was on the Kirkwood School Board from 1992 to 2004 and was its president for two years, Vice President 3 years. In 2006, he was elected to serve in the Missouri House of representatives over Democrat Jane Bogetto. He was reelected three times over Democrat Deb Lavender. He was the chairman of the Budget Committee, 2013–14.

=== Committee assignments ===
- Joint Committee on Legislative Research
- Joint Committee on Capital Improvements and Leases Oversight
- Joint Legislative Committee on Court Automation
- Budget (chairman)
- Leadership for Missouri Issue Development

== Electoral history ==
2014 St. Louis County – County Executive
Party	Candidate	Votes	%	±%
Democratic	Steve Stenger	137,638	48	
Republican	Rick Stream	135,870	48	

2012 General Election for Missouri’s 90th District House of Representatives
Party	Candidate	Votes	%	±%
Republican	Rick Stream	11,438	50.57	
Democratic	Deb Lavender	11,172	49.39	

2010 General Election for Missouri’s 94th District House of Representatives
Party	Candidate	Votes	%	±%
Republican	Rick Stream	9,326	56.16	
Democratic	Deb Lavender	7,267	43.76	

2008 General Election for Missouri’s 94th District House of Representatives
Party	Candidate	Votes	%	±%
Republican	Rick Stream	11,623	54.14	
Democratic	Deb Lavender	9,828	45.78	

2006 General Election for Missouri’s 94th District House of Representatives
Party	Candidate	Votes	%	±%
Republican	Rick Stream	9,814	51.14	
Democratic	Jan Bogetto	8,760	48.78	

2001 General Election for the Kirkwood School Board-2 to be elected
Party	Candidate	Votes	%	±%
Nonpartisan	Rick Stream	3,963	38.75	3,963
Nonpartisan	Kathy A. Harris	3,349	32.75	
Nonpartisan	Matt Cottlet	2,914	28.50	

1998 General Election for the Kirkwood School Board-2 to be elected
Party	Candidate	Votes	%	±%
Nonpartisan	Rick Stream	5,737	53.91	
Nonpartisan	Thomas W. Stevener	4,905	46.09	
