= Deb Lavender =

American politician

Member of the Missouri House of Representatives from the 98th district
- In office January 4, 2023 – January 8, 2025
- Preceded by: Trish Gunby (redistricting)
- Succeeded by: Jaclyn Zimmermann

Member of the Missouri House of Representatives from the 90th district
- In office 2015–2021
- Preceded by: Rick Stream
- Succeeded by: Barbara Phifer

Personal details
- Born: October 11, 1956 (age 69) Ridgefield, Connecticut, U.S.
- Party: Democratic
- Profession: Physical therapist, politician

Deb Lavender (born October 11, 1956) is an American politician who served in the Missouri House of Representatives from 2015 to 2021 and from 2023 to 2025. A Democrat, Lavender represented the 90th district from 2015 to 2021, which comprised all or part of the cities of Glendale, Kirkwood, Oakland, Sunset Hills, Warson Woods, and Webster Groves in St. Louis County. In 2020, she unsuccessfully ran for the Missouri Senate against incumbent Republican Andrew Koenig. In 2022, she was elected to the House again from District 98, which includes the cities of Manchester, Twin Oaks, and Valley Park.

== Early life and education ==
Lavender was born and raised in Ridgefield, Connecticut. Her interest in government service developed while, as a teenager, she participated in Girls State, a leadership program sponsored by the American Legion Auxiliary. Through her experience with the Girls State organization, she learned to appreciate the importance and value of democratic government. In 1979, Lavender was graduated from Marquette University in Milwaukee with a Bachelor of Science in physical therapy. She worked throughout her time in school to pay her tuition and living expenses. Soon after graduation Lavender moved to St. Louis, where she has been a resident for over 35 years.

== Political career ==
Lavender's political career began in 2006 as an intern for Missouri State Representative Barbara Fraser. Lavender ran for office the first time in 2008 as the unsuccessful Democratic candidate vying for the Missouri State Representative District-90 seat against Republican incumbent Rick Stream. In the next two general elections, 2010 and 2012 Lavender also lost to Stream.

On her fourth try, she was elected to the District-90 State House of Representatives seat in 2014. She was unopposed in her party's 2014 primary election and went on to defeat Republican Gina Jaksetic in the general election. Lavender was elected for a second term in 2016, winning against Republican Mark Milton. She was unopposed in that 2016 Democratic primary. In 2018, Lavender was again unopposed in her party's primary, and ran unopposed in the general election to continue for a third term as the State Representative in District-90.

After Lavender's unsuccessful run for Missouri Senate in District 15, she ran for election to the Missouri House of Representatives to represent District 98 and won in the general election on November 8, 2022. She assumed office on January 4, 2023, leaving office on January 8, 2025.

== Political views and accomplishments ==
=== Gun control ===
Lavender is against the proliferation of guns in public spaces. In the interest of public safety, she supports effecting new gun legislation and modification of existing gun laws. For example, she proposed red flag House Bill 40, which modifies restraining orders by adding provisions that allow the confiscation of firearms from individuals a court deems to be a danger to themselves or others. Lavender voted against House Bill 575 which authorizes carrying concealed weapons on college campuses and allows campus security officers to carry weapons. She also voted against Senate Bill 656 which proposed to expand open carry allowances, restricted requirements for concealed carry permits, and expanded the Castle Doctrine.

=== Health care ===
Lavender supports increased accessibility to, and the affordability of, health care. She has supported budget priorities funding healthcare for disabled and older adults. For example, she proposed House Bills 38 and 39 to expand Medicaid services.

=== Public schools ===
Lavender supports fully funding the State public school foundation formula. She believes public schools' transportation needs should be adequately funded before the Legislature effects further tax cuts. Lavender is opposed to shortening the school year. She voted against House Bill 161 which prevents the school year from starting in the Fall prior to 14 days before the first Monday in September.

=== Reproductive issues ===
Lavender is a proponent of reproductive rights. Her legislative record is aligned with reproductive rights political views. For example, she voted against House Bill 126 that would criminalize abortion services if Roe v. Wade is overturned. She also opposed House Bill 1266 that prohibits abortion after 22 weeks of pregnancy. Further, Lavender sponsored House Bill 2266 requiring organizations that provide pregnancy-related services to provide medically accurate information regarding reproductive health options in order to receive state funding. Also she cast a vote in favor of House Bill 487 authorizing a pharmacist to dispense self-administered oral contraceptives to a person who is 18-years or older.

== Committees ==
At the start of the Missouri 100th General Assembly (January 2019-January 2021), Lavender served on the following committees:

- Agriculture Policy
- Budget
- Conference Committee on Budget
- Rules - Legislative Oversight, Ranking Minority Member
- Subcommittee on Appropriations - Health, Mental Health, and Social Services, Ranking Minority Member
- Joint Committee on Legislative Research
- Joint Committee on Legislative Research - Oversight Subcommittee

== Electoral history ==
=== State representative ===
Missouri House of Representatives Election, November 4, 2008, District 94
Party	Candidate	Votes	%	±%
Democratic	Deb Lavender	9,828	45.82%	−3.00
Republican	Rick Stream	11,623	54.18%	+3.00

Missouri House of Representatives Election, November 2, 2010, District 94
Party	Candidate	Votes	%	±%
Democratic	Deb Lavender	7,267	43.80%	−2.02
Republican	Rick Stream	9,326	56.20%	+2.02

Missouri House of Representatives Election, November 6, 2012, District 90
Party	Candidate	Votes	%	±%
Democratic	Deb Lavender	11,172	49.41%	+5.61
Republican	Rick Stream	11,438	50.59%	−5.61

Missouri House of Representatives Election, November 4, 2014, District 90
Party	Candidate	Votes	%	±%
Democratic	Deb Lavender	7,597	51.51%	+2.10
Republican	Gina Jaksetic	7,153	48.49%	−2.10

Missouri House of Representatives Election, November 6, 2016, District 90
Party	Candidate	Votes	%	±%
Democratic	Deb Lavender	12,844	55.70%	+4.19
Republican	Mark Milton	10,214	44.30%	−4.19

Missouri House of Representatives Election, November 6, 2018, District 90
Party	Candidate	Votes	%	±%
Democratic	Deb Lavender	15,809	100.00%	+44.30

Missouri House of Representatives Election, November 8, 2022, District 98
Party	Candidate	Votes	%	±%
Democratic	Deb Lavender	8,213	51.51%	−48.49
Republican	Ryan Higgins	7,733	48.49%	+48.49

=== State Senate ===
Missouri Senate Election, November November 3, 2020, District 15
Party	Candidate	Votes	%	±%
Republican	Andrew Koenig	61,172	53.99%	−7.04
Democratic	Deb Lavender	52,132	46.01%	+7.07
