= Jake Zimmerman =

American politician

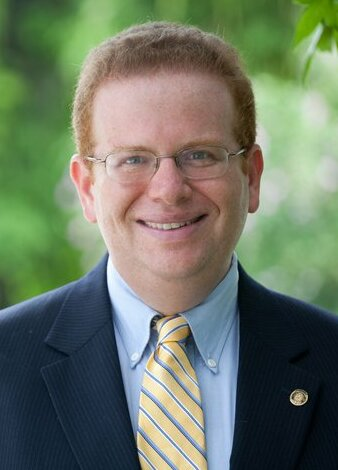
- Zimmerman in 2015

Assessor of St. Louis County
- Incumbent
- Assumed office January 2011
- Preceded by: Michael L. Brooks (acting)

Member of the Missouri House of Representatives from the 83rd district
- In office January 2007 – January 2011
- Preceded by: Barbara Fraser

Personal details
- Born: July 5, 1974 (age 52)
- Party: Democratic
- Spouse: Megan Zimmerman
- Children: 1
- Education: Claremont McKenna College (BA); Harvard University (JD)
- Website: Campaign website

Jake Zimmerman (born July 5, 1974) is the Democratic St. Louis County Assessor. He was a candidate in the 2020 Democratic primary for St. Louis County Executive. He was a candidate for Missouri Attorney General in the 2016 election. He is also a former member of the Missouri House of Representatives from the 83rd district.

== Early life and career ==
Jake Zimmerman attended Clayton High School. He then went on to attend Claremont McKenna College and Harvard Law School. He has worked as a litigator at Thompson Coburn. He is a member of the Congregation B'nai Amoona. In addition he is a board member of the Crown Center, a board member of the American Jewish Committee, and a former at-large member of the St. Louis Jewish Community Relations Council. Jake and his wife, Megan, live in Olivette with their son Gabriel.

== Political career ==
Jake Zimmerman was deputy chief counsel to former Governor of Missouri Bob Holden. Zimmerman was also Assistant Attorney General under Jay Nixon. Zimmerman was elected to the Missouri House of Representatives in November 2006 and reelected in 2008 and 2010. In 2011 he ran for St. Louis County Assessor. He faced Chip Wood, the Republican nominee, in the general election. He was elected with 63.7% of the vote and re-elected in 2014 and 2018.

== Electoral history ==
2011 Special Election for St. Louis County Assessor
Party	Candidate	Votes	%	±%
Democratic	Jake Zimmerman	73,396	63.68	
Republican	Chip Wood	41,656	36.14	

2010 General Election for Missouri’s 83rd District House of Representatives
Party	Candidate	Votes	%	±%
Democratic	Jake Zimmerman	7,435	65.24	
Republican	Patrick J. Brennan	3,947	34.63	

2008 General Election for Missouri’s 83rd District House of Representatives
Party	Candidate	Votes	%	±%
Democratic	Jake Zimmerman	14,176	98.53	

2006 General Election for Missouri’s 83rd District House of Representatives
Party	Candidate	Votes	%	±%
Democratic	Jake Zimmerman	10,460	98.81	
