= Sam Page (Missouri politician) =

American physician and politician

9th County Executive of St. Louis County
- Incumbent
- Assumed office April 29, 2019
- Preceded by: Steve Stenger

Member of the Missouri House of Representatives from the 82nd district
- In office January 2003 – January 2009
- Preceded by: David Levin
- Succeeded by: Jill Schupp

Personal details
- Born: May 24, 1965 (age 61) Kansas City, Missouri, U.S.
- Party: Democratic
- Spouse: Jennifer Page
- Children: 3
- Education: University of Missouri, Kansas City (BS, MD)

Sam Page is an American physician and politician serving as the County Executive of St. Louis County, Missouri since April 29, 2019, taking office following the resignation of his predecessor, Steve Stenger. A member of the Democratic Party, Page represented the 2nd district of the St. Louis County Council from 2014 to 2019.

== Political career ==
Page was first elected to the Creve Coeur City Council in 1999, and re-elected in 2001. In 2002, he was elected to the first of three terms in the Missouri House of Representatives.

On June 5, 2007, he announced his candidacy for the Democratic nomination for Lieutenant Governor of Missouri. After a close race, his opponent Peter Kinder was re-elected on November 4, 2008. In 2009, Dr. Page announced his candidacy for the Missouri State Senate in the 24th District. Dr. Page ultimately lost the primary race.

In 2014, St. Louis County Councilwoman, Kathleen Kelly Burkett died midterm. Dr. Page was elected to fulfill her term in a special election held on August 5, 2014. On November 8, 2016 Councilman Page was re-elected for a four-year term commencing January 1, 2017. On January 3, 2017 Council Member Page was elected Chair of the Council for 2017. He is also Chair of the Council's Committee of the Whole.

== Electoral history ==
1999 Creve Coeur City Council 3rd Ward election
Party	Candidate	Votes	%
Nonpartisan	Sam Page	789	57.71
Nonpartisan	Bob Reuther	578	42.29

2001 Creve Coeur City Council 3rd Ward Election
Party	Candidate	Votes	%
Nonpartisan	Sam Page	647	66.56
Nonpartisan	Robert Stover	325	33.44

Missouri 82nd District State Representative Election 2002
Party	Candidate	Votes	%
Democratic	Sam Page	7,799	51.50
Republican	Diann Bomkamp	7,175	47.40
Libertarian	Chris Schuster	173	1.14

Missouri 82nd District State Representative Election 2004
Party	Candidate	Votes	%
Democratic	Sam Page (Incumbent)	11,207	57.30
Republican	Diann Bomkamp	8,358	42.70

Missouri's 82nd District State Representative Election 2006
Party	Candidate	Votes	%
Democratic	Sam Page (Incumbent)	10,035	64.30
Republican	Tom Cross	5,577	35.70

Missouri Lieutenant Governor Democratic Primary 2008
Party	Candidate	Votes	%
Democratic	Sam Page	129,615	40.20
Democratic	Michael E. Carter	52,630	16.30
Democratic	Mary Williams	43,987	13.70
Democratic	Becky L. Plattner	41,185	12.80
Democratic	Richard Charles Tolbert	33,627	10.40
Democratic	C. Lillian Metzger	20,984	6.50

Missouri Lieutenant Governor General Election 2008
Party	Candidate	Votes	%
Republican	Peter Kinder	1,403,706	49.90
Democratic	Sam Page	1,331,177	47.30
Libertarian	Teddy Fleck	49,862	1.80
Constitution	James C. Rensing	29,153	1.00

Missouri 24th District State Senate Election 2010 - Democratic Primary
Party	Candidate	Votes	%
Democratic	Barbara Fraser	8,965	61.50
Democratic	Sam Page	5,126	35.20
Democratic	Helen Steele Burton	475	3.30

2014 St. Louis County Council 2nd District special election
Party	Candidate	Votes	%
Democratic	Sam Page	13,171	56.89
Republican	Robert R. Saettele	9,981	43.11

2016 St. Louis County Council 2nd District general election
Party	Candidate	Votes	%
Democratic	Sam Page (Incumbent)	35,410	55.45
Republican	Amy Poelker	25,815	40.42
Libertarian	Jeff Coleman	2,215	3.46

2020 St. Louis County Executive - Democratic Primary
Party	Candidate	Votes	%
Democratic	Sam Page (Incumbent)	71,006	38.10
Democratic	Mark Mantovani	55,129	29.58
Democratic	Jake Zimmerman	45,665	24.50
Democratic	Jamie Tolliver	14,553	7.81

2020 St. Louis County Executive general election
Party	Candidate	Votes	%
Democratic	Sam Page (Incumbent)	307,154	58.27
Republican	Paul Berry III	191,839	36.39
Green	Elizabeth (Betsy) Mitchell	16,654	3.16
Libertarian	Theo Brown	11,396	2.18

2022 St. Louis County Executive general election
Party	Candidate	Votes	%
Democratic	Sam Page (Incumbent)	189,405	51.56
Republican	Mark Mantovani	168,721	45.93
Green	Randall Holmes	9,193	2.50

== Personal life ==
Dr. Page lives in Creve Coeur with his wife, Dr. Jennifer Page, and their three children who attend the local public schools.

Party political offices
Preceded by Bekki Cook	Democratic nominee for Lieutenant Governor of Missouri; 2008	Succeeded by Susan Montee
Political offices
Preceded by Steve Stenger	County Executive of St. Louis County; 2019–present	Incumbent
