= List of county executives of St. Louis County, Missouri =

Number of county executives of St. Louis County by party affiliation
Party	County executives
Republican	4
Democratic	5

The county executive of St. Louis County, Missouri is the chief executive officer of St. Louis County's government.

== County executives ==
=== Presiding Justices, Court of Quarter Sessions ===
#	Justice	Took office	Left office
1	Charles Gratiot	1804	1813

=== Presiding Justices, County Court ===
#	Justice	Took office	Left office
1	Samuel Hammond	1813	1814
2	George T. Tompkins	1814	1815
3	David Barton	1815	1817
4	Nathan B. Tucker	1817	1820
5	Alexander Gray	1820	1820
6	Nathan B. Tucker	1820	1821
7	Joseph V. Garnier	1821	1830
8	Marie Phillip Leduc	1830	1842
9	Henry Walton	1842	1847
10	Archibald Gamble	1847	1854
11	David Thomas	1854	1857
12	Aaron R. Hackney	1857	1859

=== President of the Board of Commissioners ===
#	President	Took office	Left office
1	John H. Lightner	1859	1863

=== Presiding Justices, County Court ===
Republican Democratic

#	Justice	Took office	Left office	Party
13	John H. Lightner	1863	1866	—
14	Benjamin Charles	1866	1869	—
15	Thomas J. Dailey	1869	1870	—
16	Ferdinand Cronebold	1870	1872	—
17	Charles Spech	1872	1873	—
18	C.F. Schultz	1873	1876	—
19	Charles Spech	1876	1877	—
20	Henry L. Sutton	1877	1878	Democrat
21	George W. Brouster	1878	1882	Republican
22	W.A. Hequembourg	1883	1886	Republican
23	Julius Nolte	1887	1888	Republican
24	Theodore Heege	1889	1898	Republican
25	Henry L. Wilson	1899	1902	Republican
26	Theodore Heege	1903	1906	Republican
27	John Wiethaupt	1907	1923	Republican
28	Richard S. Smiley	1923	1927	Democrat
29	Albert Wehmeyer	1927	1937	Republican
30	Thomas H. Thatcher	1937	1941	Democrat
31	Clifford Corneli	1941	1942	Republican
32	Henry L. Mueller	1943	1943	Republican
33	Luman F. Matthews	1943	1950	Democrat

=== County Executives ===
#	Name	Took office	Left office	Party	Terms^{[A]}
1	Luman F. Matthews	1951	1959	Republican	2
2	James H. J. McNary	1959	1963	Democrat	1
3	Lawrence K. Roos	1963	1975	Republican	3
4	Gene McNary	1975	October 25, 1989	Republican	3½^{[B]}
5	H. C. Milford	October 25, 1989	January 1, 1991	Republican	½
6	Buzz Westfall	January 1, 1991	October 14, 2003	Democrat	3½^{[C]}
7	Charlie Dooley	October 14, 2003	January 1, 2015	Democrat	2½^{[D]}
8	Steve Stenger	January 1, 2015	April 29, 2019	Democrat	1½^{[E]}
9	Sam Page	April 29, 2019	Present	Democrat	

== Notes ==
- A. The fractional terms of some county executives are not to be understood absolutely literally; rather, they are meant to show single terms during which multiple county executives served, due to resignations, deaths and the like.
- B. McNary resigned from office to head the federal Immigration and Naturalization Service.
- C. Westfall died while in office.
- D. Dooley was made the acting county executive on October 14, 2003.
- E. Stenger resigned after federal indictment.
