= Charlie Dooley =

American politician

Charlie A. Dooley
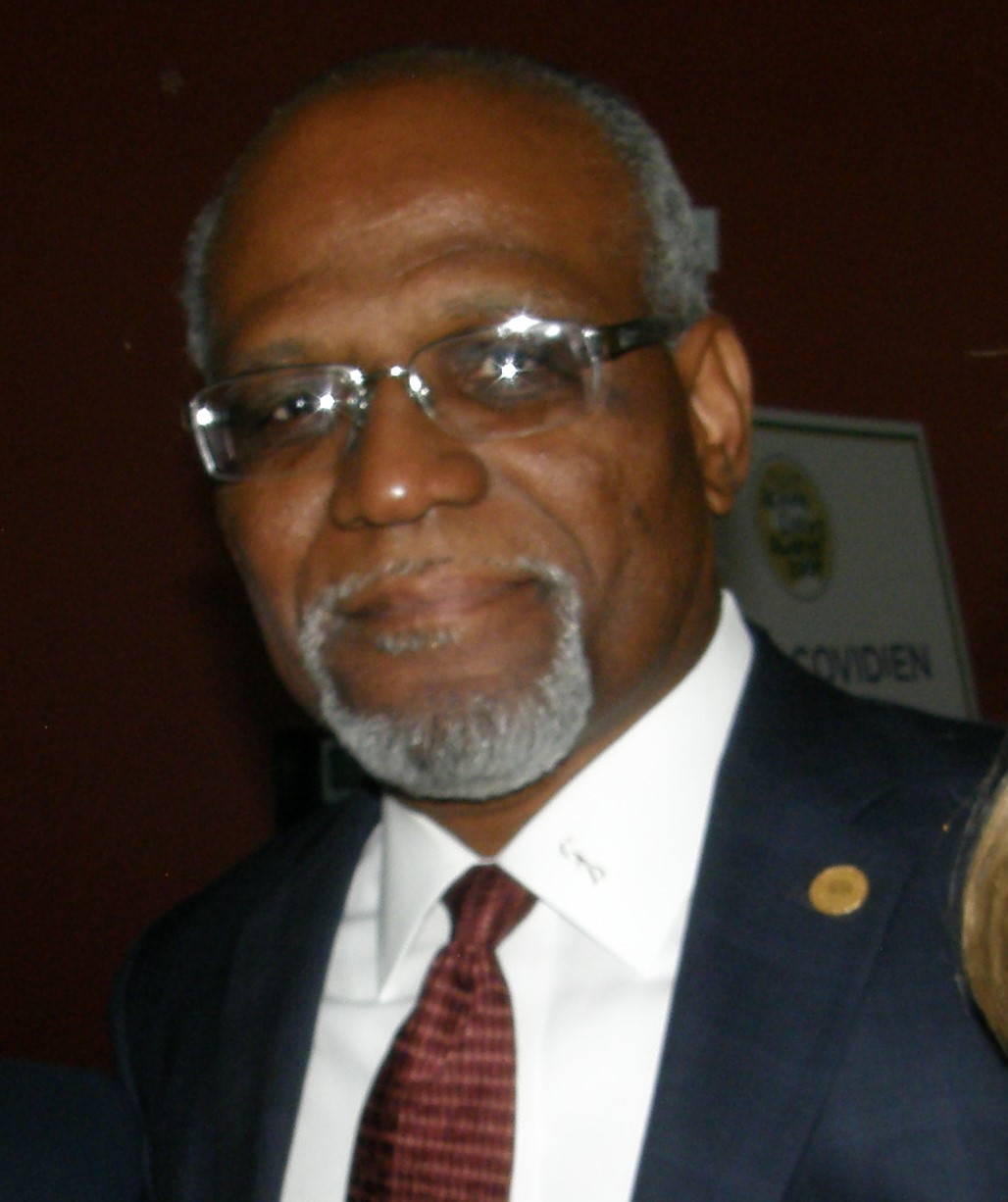

7th County Executive of St. Louis County
- In office October 14, 2003 – January 1, 2015
- Preceded by: George "Buzz" Westfall
- Succeeded by: Steve Stenger

Mayor of Northwoods, Missouri
- In office 1983–1994

Personal details
- Born: St. Louis, Missouri, U.S.
- Party: Democratic

Charlie A. Dooley is an American politician. A Democrat, he served as the County Executive of St. Louis County, Missouri until January 1, 2015. Dooley was the first African American to hold this position.

== Early life and career ==
Dooley grew up in St. Louis, attending the St. Louis Public Schools and graduated from Wellston School District. He served in the United States Army during the Vietnam War and was honorably discharged in 1968. After his military service, Dooley went to work for McDonnell Douglas (now Boeing) and retired after 30 years of service in 1999.

== Political career ==
Dooley's political career began with part-time positions in the village of Northwoods, where he and his family reside. Dooley was elected as an Alderman in Northwoods in 1978, and in 1983 he was elected mayor. He served as mayor until he was elected to the St. Louis County Council in 1994. He was the first African-American elected to the council, and was re-elected in 1998 and 2002. In 2000, Dooley was an unsuccessful candidate for election to Congress. He lost the Democratic primary to Lacy Clay in a race to succeed Clay's father, Bill Clay.

In 2003, Dooley was appointed County Executive, following the death of County Executive Buzz Westfall. In November 2004, a special election was held to fill the remainder of Westfall's term. Dooley won the election defeating the Republican nominee, former County Executive Gene McNary.

In 2006, Dooley was reelected to a full term as County Executive, defeating the Republican nominee, Joe Passanise, by gaining 67% of the vote. In a difficult mid-term election season for Democrats, Dooley was elected to serve a second full term as County Executive in 2010, defeating the Republican nominee, Bill Corrigan, 51.1% to 46.7%, with the Libertarian candidate receiving 2.2% of the vote.

On August 5, 2014, Dooley lost his bid to be the Democratic Party candidate in the County Executive election to primary challenger Steve Stenger.

Political offices
Preceded by Buzz Westfall	County Executive of St. Louis County; 2003-2015	Succeeded by Steve Stenger
