= Steve Stenger =

American politician and convicted fraudster

8th County Executive of St. Louis County
- In office January 1, 2015 – April 29, 2019
- Preceded by: Charlie Dooley
- Succeeded by: Sam Page

Member of the St. Louis County Council from the 6th district
- In office 2009–2015
- Preceded by: John Campisi
- Succeeded by: Kevin O'Leary

Personal details
- Born: Steven Stenger St. Louis, Missouri, U.S.
- Party: Democratic
- Spouse(s): Allison Stenger (m. 2009); Julie Stenger (div.)
- Education: Saint Louis University (J.D.); University of Missouri–St. Louis (B.Acy.)
- Occupation: Attorney (disbarred); Certified Public Accountant
- Website: archived campaign website
- Criminal information
- Status: Incarcerated at FPC Yankton, #48972-044
- Criminal charges: 3 counts of corruption charges for a pay-to-play scheme exchanging county contracts for campaign donations
- Penalty: 46 months

Steven Stenger is an American former attorney and former Democratic politician. He served as County Executive of St. Louis County, Missouri from January 2015 to April 2019. He resigned his position in April 2019 after being federally indicted on honest services bribery and mail fraud charges.

== Early life and education ==
Steve Stenger was born in the St. Louis Hills neighborhood located in southwest St. Louis, but was brought up in Affton, Missouri. His father was a union telephone lineman with Southwestern Bell. Steve Stenger graduated from Bishop DuBourg High School and briefly toured as a singer with two local bands, The Stand and The Painted Faces. Stenger then went to University of Missouri–St. Louis and majored in accounting. After that, he became a certified public accountant (CPA) and went to law school at St. Louis University. After law school, he got a job as a lawyer and CPA at Ernst & Young.

== Political career ==
Steve Stenger was the prosecuting attorney of a city government from 2005-2008. He was on the St. Louis County Council from 2009 to 2015. He represented the sixth district, which contained about 145,000 people in south St. Louis County. He became Chairman of the Council in 2011. In 2014, he defeated Charlie Dooley, a long-time incumbent, during the Democratic primaries for St Louis County Executive. He proceeded to win the St. Louis County Executive general election, narrowly edging out his Republican opponent Rick Stream.

He took office as St. Louis County Executive in 2015. Stenger announced his resignation on April 29, 2019, after being federally indicted on three counts of honest services bribery and mail fraud. On May 28, 2019, Stenger was disbarred by the Supreme Court of Missouri. In August 2019, Stenger was sentenced to 46 months in prison and to pay a fine of $250,000. Stenger served his sentence at FPC Yankton and was released to home confinement on June 8, 2021

== Electoral history ==
2018 St. Louis County - County Executive
Party	Candidate	Votes	%	±%
Democratic	Steve Stenger	252,327	57	
Republican	Paul Berry III	164,675	37	

2014 St. Louis County - County Executive
Party	Candidate	Votes	%	±%
Democratic	Steve Stenger	137,638	48	
Republican	Rick Stream	135,870	48	

2012 St. Louis County Council 6th district general election
Party	Candidate	Votes	%	±%
Democratic	Steve Stenger	37,667	55.19	
Republican	Tony Pousosa	30,505	44.69	

2008 St. Louis County Council 6th district general election
Party	Candidate	Votes	%	±%
Democratic	Steve Stenger	39,896	53.06	
Republican	John Campisi	35,203	46.82	

Political offices
Preceded by Charlie Dooley	County Executive of St. Louis County; 2015–2019	Succeeded by Sam Page
