= Buzz Westfall =

American politician

George "Buzz" Westfall

6th County Executive of St. Louis County
- In office January 1, 1991 – October 14, 2003
- Preceded by: H. C. Milford
- Succeeded by: Charlie Dooley

Personal details
- Born: March 19, 1944 St. Louis, Missouri, U.S.
- Died: October 27, 2003 (aged 59) St. Louis County, Missouri, U.S.
- Cause of death: Staph meningitis
- Party: Democratic
- Spouse: Laurie Westfall

George "Buzz" Westfall (March 19, 1944 – October 27, 2003) was an American lawyer and politician. He served in the elected offices of Prosecuting Attorney (1978–1990) and County Executive (1991–2003) of St. Louis County, Missouri. He died, while in office, of Staphylococcus aureus meningitis at the age of 59.

Westfall grew up in public housing in St. Louis. He attended St. Louis University High School and graduated from Saint Louis University with his BA and JD degrees. After completing law school, he took a position in the St. Louis County Prosecuting Attorney's office as an assistant prosecutor. In 1978, Westfall was elected as head Prosecuting Attorney for St. Louis County. Westfall was re-elected in 1982 and 1986 without opposition.

In 1990, Westfall was the Democratic nominee for the County Executive's position, and he defeated incumbent H.C. Milford in his bid for re-election. Westfall was re-elected County Executive in 1994, 1998, and 2002. In October 2003, less than a year into his fourth term in office, Westfall died after developing a meningitis staph infection. Westfall was survived by his wife and three grown children.

Following Westfall's death, his friends and family established a charitable enterprise, the Buzz Westfall Memorial Fund, in his honor. The Memorial Fund, later renamed The Buzz Westfall Charitable Foundation, was a non-profit enterprise established to further Westfall's legacy of bettering the community through charitable works. The Foundation raised funds via an annual golf tournament, among other various events, with proceeds going directly to various charities.

Westfall Lane, a street in Jennings, Missouri, was dedicated to the memory of Mr. Westfall in early 2004. In 2006, the Buzz Westfall Plaza On The Boulevard opened for business, anchored by a new Schnucks supermarket and Target, on the site of the deteriorating Northland Shopping Center in Jennings. Other memorials include the Buzz Westfall Justice Center in Clayton, Missouri, and the Buzz Westfall Memorial Highway, a portion of Highway 364 in St. Louis County.

Westfall served a total of 35 years in St. Louis County government, including 24 years in elected office.

== See also ==
- St. Louis University press release upon giving an award to Westfall - include biographical information
- Commentary by Gene McNary after Westfall's death

Political offices
Preceded by H. C. Milford	County Executive of St. Louis County; 1991–2003	Succeeded by Charlie Dooley
