= 2026 Missouri House of Representatives election =

2026 Missouri House of Representatives elections
- November 3, 2026

All 163 seats in the Missouri House of Representatives 82 seats needed for a majority
	Majority party	Minority party
Leader	Jon Patterson	Ashley Aune
Party	Republican	Democratic
Leader's seat	30th – Lee's Summit	14th – Kansas City
Last election	111	52
Seats before	106	52
Seats won	95	68
Seat change	▼16	▲16
- Map of the incumbents: Republican incumbent Democratic incumbent
Speaker before election
Jon Patterson
Republican
Elected Speaker
TBD

The 2026 Missouri House of Representatives election was held on November 3, 2026, as part of the biennial 2026 United States elections. It was held alongside numerous other federal, state, and local elections, including the 2026 Missouri Senate election. All 163 seats in the Missouri House of Representatives were up for election. Primary elections took place on August 4, 2026.

== Vacant seats ==
- District 95: Republican Michael O'Donnell resigned in January 2025.
- District 110: Republican Justin Sparks resigned in November 2025.
- District 114: Republican Ken Waller died in August 2025.
- District 149: Republican Donnie Brown resigned in August 2025.
- District 160: Republican Ben Baker resigned in May 2025.

== Incumbents retiring ==
=== Democratic ===
- District 22: Yolanda Young is term-limited.
- District 35: Keri Ingle is term-limited.
- District 37: Mark Sharp is term-limited.
- District 71: LaDonna Appelbaum is term-limited.
- District 72: Doug Clemens is term-limited.
- District 73: Raychel Proudie is term-limited.
- District 79: LaKeySha Frazier-Bosley is term-limited.
- District 81: Steve Butz is term-limited.
- District 99: Ian Mackey is term-limited.
- District 135: Betsy Fogle ran for state senate.

=== Republican ===
- District 3: Danny Busick is term-limited.
- District 4: Greg Sharpe is term-limited.
- District 5: Louis Riggs is term-limited.
- District 7: Peggy McGaugh is term-limited.
- District 10: Bill Falkner is term-limited.
- District 11: Brenda Shields is term-limited.
- District 30: Jonathan Patterson is term-limited.
- District 32: Jeff Coleman is term-limited.
- District 43: Kent Haden is term-limited.
- District 52: Brad Pollitt is term-limited.
- District 57: Rodger Reedy is term-limited.
- District 59: Rudy Veit is term-limited.
- District 60: Dave Griffith is term-limited.
- District 94: Jim Murphy is term-limited.
- District 97: David Casteel ran for state senate.
- District 112: Renee Reuter ran for state senate.
- District 116: Dale Wright is term-limited.
- District 118: Mike McGirl is term-limited.
- District 124: Don Mayhew is term-limited.
- District 127: Ann Kelley is term-limited.
- District 129: John Black is term-limited.
- District 133: Melanie Stinnett ran for state senate.
- District 142: Jeff Knight is term-limited.
- District 146: Barry Hovis is term-limited.
- District 152: Hardy Billington is term-limited.
- District 158: Scott Cupps is term-limited.
- District 159: Dirk Deaton is term-limited.
- District 161: Lane Roberts is term-limited.
- District 162: Bob Bromley is term-limited.

== Predictions ==
Source	Ranking	As of
Sabato's Crystal Ball	Likely R	January 22, 2026
State Navigate	Safe R	October 23, 2026

== Detailed Results ==
District	2024 Pres.	Incumbent	Party	Elected	Outcome	Margin
1		Jeff Farnan	Rep	Jeff Farnan	Rep Hold	
2		Mazzie Christensen	Rep	Phil Fox	Rep Hold	
3		Danny Busick	Rep	P. Jeremy Mosley	Rep Hold	
4		Greg Sharpe	Rep	Keith Gudehus	Rep Hold	
5		Louis Riggs	Rep	Roth McElvain	Rep Hold	
6		Ed Lewis	Rep	Kelly Gatts	Rep Hold	
7		Peggy McGaugh	Rep	Jeremy Clevenger	Rep Hold	
8		Josh Hurlbert	Rep	Josh Hurlbert	Rep Hold	
9		Dean Van Schoiack	Rep	Dean Van Schoiack	Rep Hold	
10		Bill Falkner	Rep	Paul Gatewood	Rep Hold	
11		Brenda Shields	Rep	Taylor Crouse	Rep Hold	
12		Mike Jones	Rep	Tracey Steele	Dem Gain	
13		Sean Pouche	Rep	John Elliott	Rep Hold	
14		Ashley Aune	Dem	Ashley Aune	Dem Hold	
15		Ken Jamison	Dem	Ken Jamison	Dem Hold	
16		Chris Brown	Rep	Daniel Kinate	Dem Gain	
17		Bill Allen	Rep	Bill Allen	Rep Hold	
18		Eric Woods	Dem	Eric Woods	Dem Hold	
19		Wick Thomas	Dem	Wick Thomas	Dem Hold	
20		Mike Steinmeyer	Rep	Jeff Spicer	Dem Gain	
21		Will Jobe	Dem	Will Jobe	Dem Hold	
22		Yolanda Young	Dem	Yolanda Young	Dem Hold	
23		Michael Johnson	Dem	Tony Van Trece	Dem Hold	
24		Emily Weber	Dem	Kevin Garner	Dem Hold	
25		Pattie Mansur	Dem	Pattie Mansur	Dem Hold	
26		Tiffany Price	Dem	Tiffany Price	Dem Hold	
27		Melissa Douglas	Dem	Melissa Douglas	Dem Hold	
28		Donna Barnes	Dem	Donna Barnes	Dem Hold	
29		Aaron Crossley*	Dem	Tedi Rowland	Dem Hold	
30		Jonathan Patterson	Rep	Kevin Grover	Dem Gain	
31		Ron Fowler	Rep	Justin Geiser	Dem Gain	
32		Jeff Coleman	Rep	Michael Todd	Rep Hold	
33		Carolyn Caton	Rep	Carolyn Caton	Rep Hold	
34		Kemp Strickler	Dem	Kemp Strickler	Dem Hold	
35		Keri Ingle	Dem	Michael Scott	Dem Hold	
36		Anthony Ealy	Dem	Anthony Ealy	Dem Hold	
37		Mark Sharp	Dem	Karissa Varga	Dem Hold	
38		Martin Jacobs	Dem	Martin Jacobs	Dem Hold	
39		Mark Meirath	Rep	Mark Meirath	Rep Hold	
40		Chad Perkins	Rep	Chad Perkins	Rep Hold	
41		Doyle Justus	Rep	Doyle Justus	Rep Hold	
42		Jeff Myers	Rep	Jeff Myers	Rep Hold	
43		Kent Haden	Rep	Brendan Webber	Rep Hold	
44		John Martin	Rep	John Martin	Rep Hold	
45		Kathy Steinhoff	Dem	Kathy Steinhoff	Dem Hold	
46		David Smith	Dem	David Smith	Dem Hold	
47		Adrian Plank	Dem	Adrian Plank	Dem Hold	
48		Tim Taylor	Rep	Tim Taylor	Rep Hold	
49		Jim Schulte	Rep	Jim Schulte	Rep Hold	
50		Gregg Bush	Dem	Gregg Bush	Dem Hold	
51		Mark Nolte	Rep	Stephanie Gooden	Rep Hold	
52		Brad Pollitt	Rep	Israel Baeza	Rep Hold	
53		Terry Thompson	Rep	Terry Thompson	Rep Hold	
54		Brandon Phelps	Rep	Brandon Phelps	Rep Hold	
55		Bill Irwin	Rep	Bill Irwin	Rep Hold	
56		Michael Davis	Rep	Staci Czar	Dem Gain	
57		Rodger Reedy	Rep	Matthew Sergent	Rep Hold	
58		Willard Haley	Rep	Willard Haley	Rep Hold	
59		Rudy Veit	Rep	Carrie Tergin	Rep Hold	
60		Dave Griffith	Rep	Suzanne Luther	Dem Gain	
61		Bruce Sassmann	Rep	Bruce Sassmann	Rep Hold	
62		Sherri Gallick	Rep	Sherri Gallick	Rep Hold	
63		Tricia Byrnes	Rep	Tony Lovasco	Rep Hold	
64		Deanna Self	Rep	Deanna Self	Rep Hold	
65		Wendy Hausman	Rep	Wendy Hausman	Rep Hold	
66		Marlene Terry	Dem	Marlene Terry	Dem Hold	
67		Tonya Rush	Dem	Tonya Rush	Dem Hold	
68		Kem Smith	Dem	Kem Smith	Dem Hold	
69		Scott Miller	Rep			
70		Stephanie Boykin	Dem	Stephanie Boykin	Dem Hold	
71		LaDonna Appelbaum	Dem	Nicole Greer	Dem Hold	
72		Doug Clemens	Dem	Patrick Wroblewski	Dem Hold	
73		Raychel Proudie	Dem	Kennedy Moore	Dem Hold	
74		Marla Smith	Dem	Marla Smith	Dem Hold	
75		Chanel Mosley	Dem	Chanel Mosley	Dem Hold	
76		Marlon Anderson	Dem	Marlon Anderson	Dem Hold	
77		Kimberly-Ann Collins	Dem	Kimberly-Ann Collins	Dem Hold	
78		Marty Joe Murray	Dem	Marty Joe Murray	Dem Hold	
79		LaKeySha Frazier-Bosley	Dem	Rachel D'Souza	Dem Hold	
80		Elizabeth Fuchs	Dem	Elizabeth Fuchs	Dem Hold	
81		Steve Butz	Dem	James Lappe	Dem Hold	
82		Nick Kimble	Dem	Nick Kimble	Dem Hold	
83		Ray Reed	Dem	Ray Reed	Dem Hold	
84		Del Taylor	Dem	Del Taylor	Dem Hold	
85		Yolonda Fountain Henderson	Dem	Yolonda Fountain Henderson	Dem Hold	
86		Jeff Hales	Dem	Jeff Hales	Dem Hold	
87		Connie Steinmetz	Dem	Connie Steinmetz	Dem Hold	
88		Holly Jones	Rep	Holly Jones	Rep Hold	
89		George J. Hruza	Rep	George J. Hruza	Rep Hold	
90		Mark Boyko	Dem	Mark Boyko	Dem Hold	
91		Jo Doll	Dem	Jo Doll	Dem Hold	
92		Michael Burton	Dem	Michael Burton	Dem Hold	
93		Bridget Walsh Moore	Dem	Bridget Walsh Moore	Dem Hold	
94		Jim Murphy	Rep	Cathy Summers	Dem Gain	
95		Michael O'Donnell*	Rep	Bob Mahacek	Rep Hold	
96		Brad Christ	Rep	Matt Vitale	Dem Gain	
97		David Casteel	Rep	David Robertson	Rep Hold	
98		Jaclyn Zimmermann	Dem	Jaclyn Zimmermann	Dem Hold	
99		Ian Mackey*	Dem	Tori Schafer	Dem Hold	
100		Philip Oehlerking	Rep	Mary Ann Perkins	Dem Gain	
101		Ben Keathley	Rep	Paul Lentz	Dem Gain	
102		Richard West	Rep	Richard West	Rep Hold	
103		Dave Hinman	Rep	Dave Hinman	Rep Hold	
104		Terri Violet	Rep	Tara Murray	Dem Gain	
105		Colin Wellenkamp	Rep	Caterina Clayton	Dem Gain	
106		Travis Wilson	Rep	Jewel Kelly Jr.	Dem Gain	
107		Mark Matthiesen	Rep	Mark Matthiesen	Rep Hold	
108		Mike Costlow	Rep	Mike Costlow	Rep Hold	
109		John Simmons	Rep	John Simmons	Rep Hold	
110		Justin Sparks*	Rep	Niles Stephens	Rep Hold	
111		Cecelie Williams	Rep	Cecelie Williams	Rep Hold	
112		Renee Reuter	Rep	Ed Callahan	Rep Hold	
113		Phil Amato	Rep	Phil Amato	Rep Hold	
114		Ken Waller*	Rep	Ann Moloney	Rep Hold	
115		Bill Lucas	Rep	Bill Lucas	Rep Hold	
116		Dale Wright	Rep	Jason Green	Rep Hold	
117		Becky Laubinger	Rep	Becky Laubinger	Rep Hold	
118		Mike McGirl	Rep	Amy DeClue	Rep Hold	
119		Brad Banderman	Rep	Brad Banderman	Rep Hold	
120		John Hewkin	Rep	John Hewkin	Rep Hold	
121		Bill Hardwick	Rep	Keith Pritchard	Rep Hold	
122		Tara Peters	Rep	Tara Peters	Rep Hold	
123		Jeff Vernetti	Rep	Jeff Vernetti	Rep Hold	
124		Don Mayhew	Rep	Kevin Onstott	Rep Hold	
125		Dane Diehl	Rep	Dane Diehl	Rep Hold	
126		Jim Kalberloh	Rep	Jim Kalberloh	Rep Hold	
127		Ann Kelley	Rep	Brenden Kelley	Rep Hold	
128		Christopher Warwick	Rep	Christopher Warwick	Rep Hold	
129		John Black	Rep	William Worsham	Rep Hold	
130		Bishop Davidson	Rep	Bishop Davidson	Rep Hold	
131		Bill Owen	Rep	Bill Owen	Rep Hold	
132		Jeremy Dean	Dem	Jeremy Dean	Dem Hold	
133		Melanie Stinnett	Rep	Katelyn Zach	Dem Gain	
134		Alex Riley	Rep	Alex Riley	Rep Hold	
135		Betsy Fogle	Dem	John Chiles	Dem Hold	
136		Stephanie Hein	Dem	Stephanie Hein	Dem Hold	
137		Darin Chappell	Rep	Darin Chappell	Rep Hold	
138		Burt Whaley	Rep	Burt Whaley	Rep Hold	
139		Bob Titus	Rep	Bob Titus	Rep Hold	
140		Jamie Gragg	Rep	Jamie Gragg	Rep Hold	
141		Melissa Schmidt	Rep	Melissa Schmidt	Rep Hold	
142		Jeff Knight	Rep	Jeff Brown	Rep Hold	
143		Bennie Cook	Rep	Bennie Cook	Rep Hold	
144		Tony Harbison	Rep	Chris Dinkins	Rep Hold	
145		Bryant Wolfin	Rep	Bryant Wolfin	Rep Hold	
146		Barry Hovis	Rep	Lucas Green	Rep Hold	
147		John Voss	Rep	John Voss	Rep Hold	
148		David Dolan	Rep	David Dolan	Rep Hold	
149		Donnie Brown	Rep	Scott Crumpecker	Rep Hold	
150		Cameron Parker	Rep	Cameron Parker	Rep Hold	
151		Steve Jordan	Rep	Steve Jordan	Rep Hold	
152		Hardy Billington	Rep	Jeff Shawan	Rep Hold	
153		Keith Elliott	Rep	Keith Elliott	Rep Hold	
154		Lisa Durnell	Rep	Lisa Durnell	Rep Hold	
155		Matthew Overcast	Rep	Matthew Overcast	Rep Hold	
156		Brian Seitz	Rep	Brian Seitz	Rep Hold	
157		Mitch Boggs	Rep	Mitch Boggs	Rep Hold	
158		Scott Cupps	Rep	Scott Cupps	Rep Hold	
159		Dirk Deaton*	Rep	Joel Mace	Rep Hold	
160		Ben Baker*	Rep	Cheryle Perkins	Rep Hold	
161		Lane Roberts	Rep	Louise Secker	Rep Hold	
162		Bob Bromley	Rep	Roger Koch	Rep Hold	
163		Cathy Jo Loy	Rep	Cathy Jo Loy	Rep Hold	

* resigned or died in office before election

== See also ==
- List of Missouri General Assemblies
