= Niles Stephens =

American politician

Member-elect of the Missouri House of Representatives from the 110th district
- Assuming office January 6, 2027
- Succeeding: Justin Sparks

Personal details
- Party: Republican
- Website: Campaign website

Niles Stephens is an American politician of the Missouri Republican Party who is the representative-elect for the 110th district in the Missouri House of Representatives. He was elected in the 2026 general election. He defeated Democrat candidate Claire Heinrich. Stephens is a member of Wildwood City Council. He previously ran for mayor of Wildwood.
