= Douglas Mann (politician) =

American politician

Member of the Missouri House of Representatives from the 50th district
- In office January 4, 2023 – January 8, 2025
- Preceded by: Sara Walsh
- Succeeded by: Gregg Bush

Personal details
- Born: Dunkirk, New York
- Party: Democratic
- Education: Niagara University; University of Illinois Chicago; University of Missouri
- Website: https://www.upballot.com/douglas-mann

Douglas (Doug) Mann is an American politician who was as a Democratic member of the Missouri House of Representatives from 2023 to 2025, representing the state's 50th House district.

== Career ==
Mann is a civil rights attorney by profession. He has also worked as a high school teacher.

Mann did not seek re-election in the 2024 Missouri House of Representatives election.
