= Dottie Bailey =

American politician and lobbyist

Member of the Missouri House of Representatives from the 110th district
- In office January 2019 – January 2023
- Preceded by: Kirk Mathews
- Succeeded by: Justin Sparks

Personal details
- Born: Belleville, Illinois, U.S.
- Party: Republican
- Children: 2
- Education: Eastern Illinois University (BS)

Dottie Bailey is an American politician and lobbyist who served as a member of the Missouri House of Representatives from the 110th district. Elected in November 2018, she assumed office in January 2019.

== Early life and education ==
Bailey was born in Belleville, Illinois. She earned a Bachelor of Science degree from Eastern Illinois University in 1997.

== Career ==
Bailey began her career in the banking industry. She later became involved with Heritage Action after the Ferguson unrest and has been a member of the St. Louis Tea Party Coalition Board since 2015. She was elected to the Missouri House of Representatives in November 2018 and assumed office in January 2019. She also serves as vice chair of the House Children and Families Committee.
