= David Evans (Missouri politician) =

American politician

Member of the Missouri House of Representatives from the 154th District
- In office 2019 – January 8, 2025
- Preceded by: Shawn Rhoads
- Succeeded by: Lisa Durnell

Personal details
- Party: Republican
- Education: Southern Methodist University

David Paul Evans is an American politician who was a member of the Missouri House of Representatives from Missouri's 154th district. He won the seat unanimously after no other candidate ran against him.
