= Tonya Rush =

American politician

Member of the Missouri House of Representatives from the 67th district
- Incumbent
- Assumed office January 8, 2025
- Preceded by: Chantelle Nickson-Clark

Personal details
- Party: Democratic
- Website: www.tonyarush.org

Tonya Rush is an American politician who was elected to the Missouri House of Representatives from the 67th district in 2024 and entered office in January 2025.

Rush is a licensed realtor in the state of Missouri.
