= Bennie Cook =

American politician (born 1979)

Member of the Missouri House of Representatives from the 143rd District
- Incumbent
- Assumed office January 6, 2021
- Preceded by: Robert Ross

Personal details
- Born: March 15, 1979 (age 47) Belle, Missouri, U.S.
- Party: Republican
- Spouse: Amanda Cook

Bennie Cook is an American politician currently serving in the Missouri House of Representatives from Missouri's 142nd district. After winning a narrow plurality in the Republican primary election, he ran unopposed in the general election and won. He was sworn in on January 6, 2021.

== Electoral history ==
Missouri House of Representatives Primary Election, August 4, 2020, District 142
Party	Candidate	Votes	%	±%
Republican	Bennie Cook	3,102	49.9%	
Republican	Terry Brown	2,821	45.4%	
Republican	David J. Giarratano	297	4.8%	
Total votes		6,202	100.00%	
