= Carrie Tergin =

American politician

Mayor of Jefferson City
- In office April 20, 2015 – April 17, 2023
- Preceded by: Eric Struemph
- Succeeded by: Ron Fitzwater

Personal details
- Born: 1972 (age 53–54)
- Party: Republican
- Education: Southwest Missouri State University (BA)

Carrie Tergin (born 1972) was the 60th mayor of Jefferson City, Missouri. She served from 2015-2023. She was the second female mayor of Jefferson City.

== Political career ==
Before being elected mayor, Tergin served on the Jefferson City council for six years.

Tergin was elected mayor of Jefferson City with 41% of the vote on April 6, 2015. She was reelected in 2019 with 84% of the vote. She said she emulates Missouri First Lady Teresa Parson and put a sign on her door that reads "The People's Office," honoring Parson's openness. During the coronavirus pandemic in March 2020, Tergin signed an emergency proclamation that directed all Jefferson City residents to comply with the provisions of any order issued by the Cole County Health Department. In June 2020, she voted in favor of using Chesterfield Hotels, architecture and design firm Arcturis, Peckham Architecture and Central Missouri Professional Services to redevelop the Missouri State Penitentiary site.

=== May 2019 tornado response ===
Mayor Tergin received national coverage in May 2019 for her response to the disastrous tornado that hit Jefferson City in May 2019. Before the tornado she issued mandatory evacuation orders for parts of Jefferson City, and an emergency declaration. She enforced a curfew for Jefferson City the day after the tornado tore through town. She reported that the city had prepared for flooding but had not prepared for such extensive damage from the tornado. Relatively few people were injured, which Tergin attributed to strong compliance with the emergency orders, in addition with the late hour at which the tornado hit. Tergin was praised for her communication and organizing relief efforts after the tornado.

== Personal life ==
Tergin's grandfather George Tergin was a Greek immigrant and operated a shoeshine and hat service until retiring in 1976. Tergin studied business management at Southwest Missouri State University.

She was also appointed to the Missouri State University Board of Governors in January 2013 and served as board chair in 2018.

Tergin owns a store, Carrie's Hallmark Shop, in Jefferson City.

== See also ==
- Tornado outbreak sequence of May 2019 - Jefferson City

Political offices
Preceded by Eric Struemph	Mayor of Jefferson City; 2015–2023	Succeeded by Ron Fitzwater
