= Brad Christ =

American politician

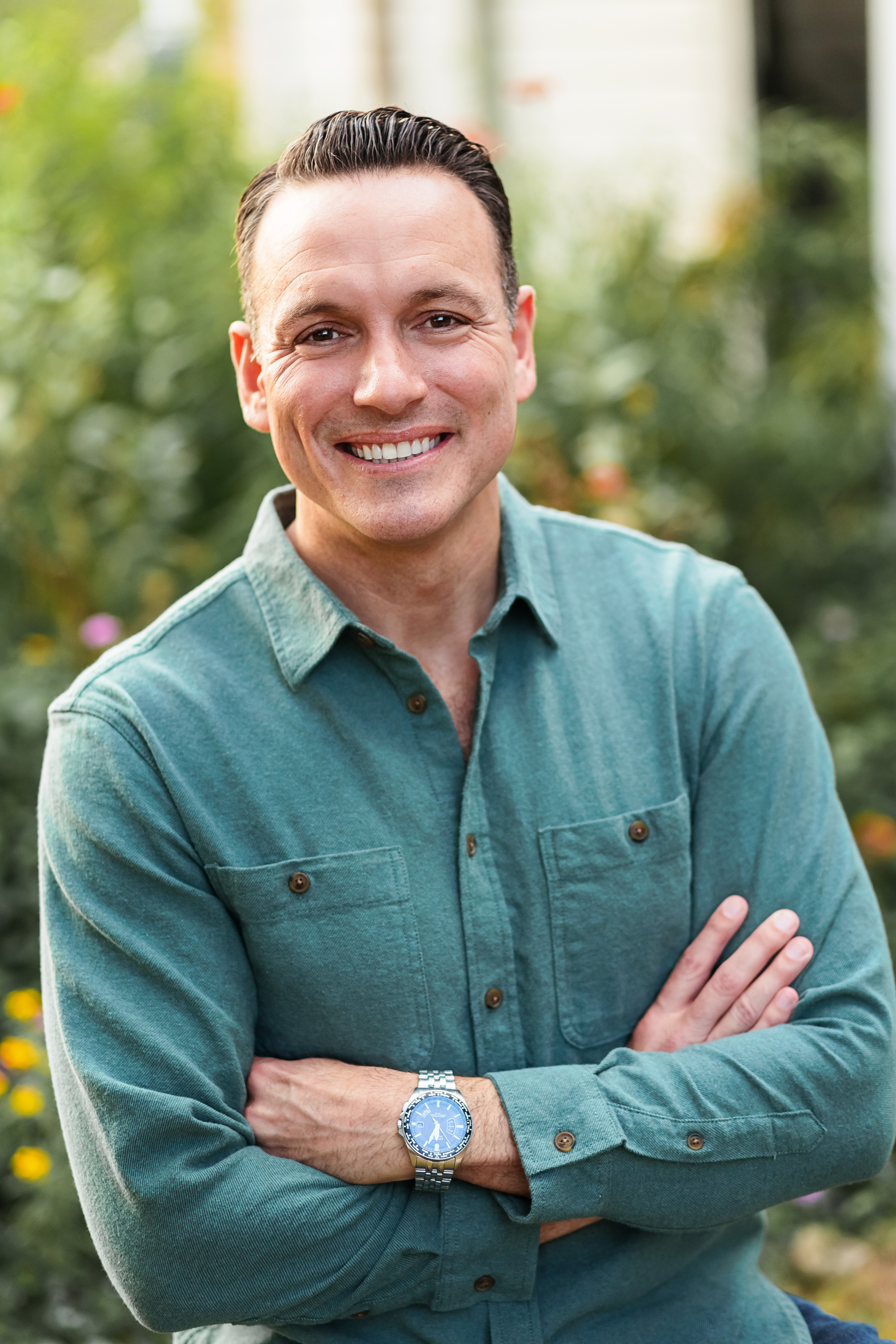

Member of the Missouri House of Representatives from the 96th district
- Incumbent
- Assumed office January 4, 2023
- Preceded by: David Gregory
- Succeeded by: Matt Vitale (elect)

Personal details
- Born: St. Louis, Missouri, U.S.
- Party: Republican
- Education: DePaul University
- Website: https://www.bradchristformo.com/

Brad Christ is an American politician serving as a Republican member of the Missouri House of Representatives from the 96th district since 2023. The district covers part of St. Louis County, including Sunset Hills, Fenton, and South County. He succeeded David Gregory, who did not seek re-election in order to run for State Auditor

== Early life and career ==
Christ was born in St. Louis. He graduated from St. Louis University High School in 2002 and received a bachelor's degree in finance from DePaul University in 2006.

Christ worked in the professional services and insurance sectors before and during his legislative service, including as a consultant and director at Aon and as a vice president at the Marsh McLennan Agency. He is an insurance broker with the Crane Agency, where his work involves risk and benefits management for businesses.

Before seeking office he served as president of his subdivision's homeowners association.

Christ lives in Sappington with his wife Erin; they have four children.

== Legislative career ==
In 2025, Christ sponsored House Bill 495, an omnibus public safety measure whose central provision returned the St. Louis Metropolitan Police Department to the control of a state-appointed board. The bill created a board of commissioners composed of the mayor of St. Louis and five members appointed by the governor and confirmed by the state Senate, restoring an arrangement that had governed the department from 1861 until 2012, when Missouri voters approved a ballot measure placing it under city control. The bill also required the city to dedicate 25 percent of its budget to the police department by January 1, 2028, and included provisions on stunt driving and organized retail theft.

The House gave final approval on a 113 to 39 vote in March 2025, largely along party lines, and also approved an emergency clause. Christ told the House that public safety was the region's greatest challenge and described the bill as one tool rather than a complete solution. Governor Mike Kehoe signed it on March 26, 2025, making St. Louis and Kansas City the only major American cities with police departments under state control.

In 2026 Christ sponsored and passed House Bill 3231, the Missouri Innovation, Public Safety, and Accountability Act, an economic development measure. The bill created a Missouri Innovation Zone designation that cities could apply for through the Department of Economic Development, covering a historic downtown, central business district, town square, or main street corridor, in exchange for local regulatory commitments. Within certified zones, the law established tax credits for converting vacant office buildings into residential units, administered through a scorecard system operated by the department.

The act also reauthorized and expanded the Missouri Downtown Economic Stimulus Act, renaming it the Missouri Downtown and Rural Economic Stimulus Act; created a new Missouri Works incentive for capital investments exceeding $50 million; extended Missouri One Start job incentives to innovation zones; established an angel investment tax credit for investments in state startups; and created a Rural Missouri Development Fund, financed by a share of new state sales tax revenue from innovation zones and distributed to rural communities as grants.

The bill was handled in the Senate by Kurtis Gregory. It passed the House 119 to 27 in March 2026 and the Senate 25 to 7 in May, with the House concurring in Senate amendments 119 to 24. Governor Mike Kehoe signed it in July 2026, and it took effect on August 28. Ron Kitchens of Greater St. Louis, Inc. credited the measure with catalyzing investment in the region.

== Legislative Committees 2025-26 ==
- Chairman - Emerging Issues
- Rules - Administrative
- Special Committee on Tax Reform

== Legislative Committees 2023-24 ==
- Chairman - Special Committee on Property Tax Reform
- Vice-chairman - Economic Development
- Budget
- Subcommittee on Appropriations - Public Safety, Corrections, Transportation, and Revenue

== Election Outcomes ==
Missouri House of Representatives Election, November 8, 2022, District 96
Party	Candidate	Votes	%	±%
Republican	Brad Christ	9,596	54.45	
Democratic	Leslie Derrington	8,026	45.55	
Total votes		17,622	100.00	

Missouri House of Representatives Election, November 5, 2024, District 96
Party	Candidate	Votes	%	±%
Republican	Brad Christ (incumbent)	12,297	55.23	
Democratic	Leslie Derrington	9,967	44.77	
Total votes		22,264	100.00	
