= Dale Wright (politician) =

American politician

Dale L. Wright
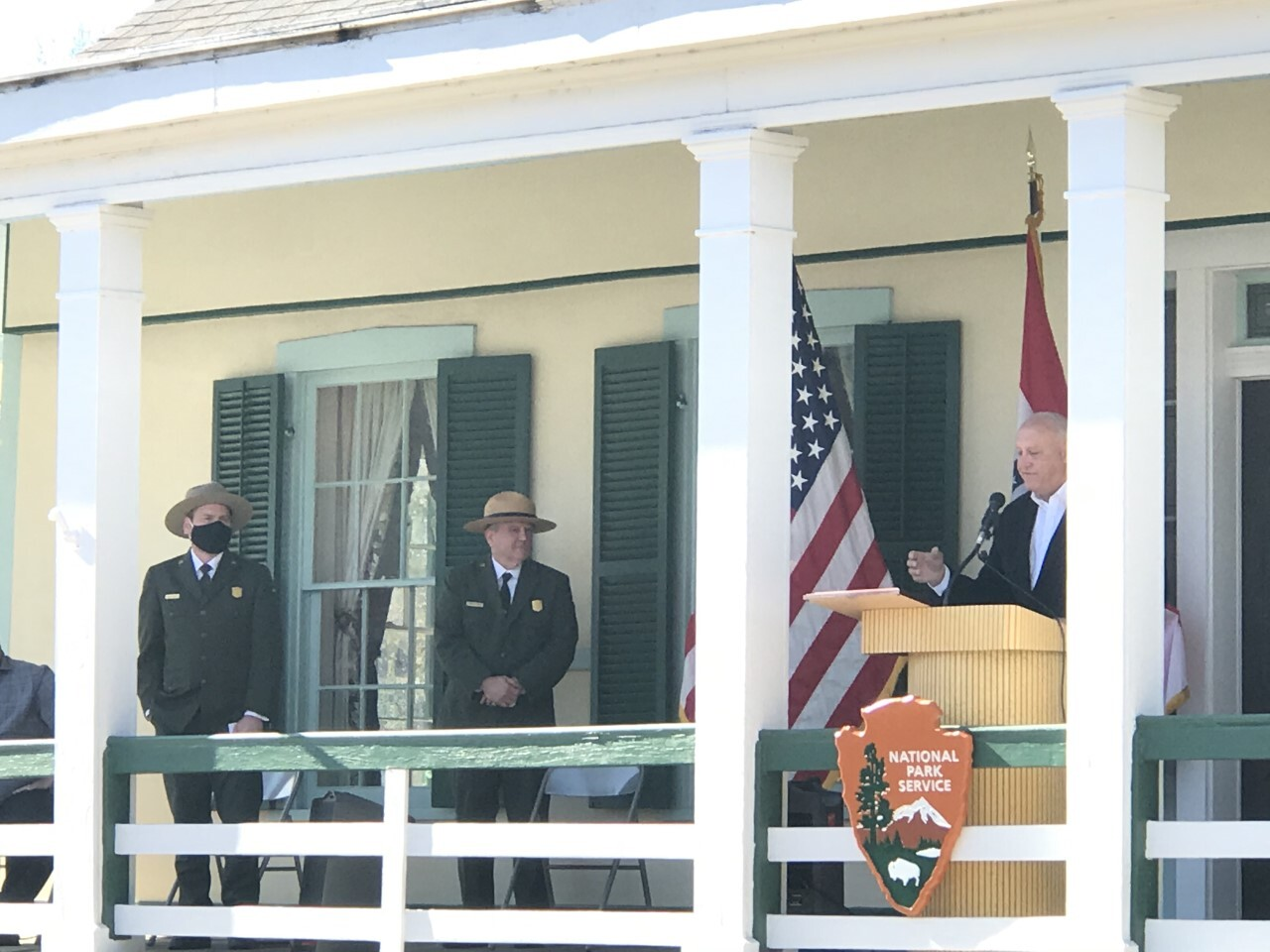
- Wright (right) offers remarks at the Ste. Geneviève National Historical Park Dedication Ceremony (2020)

Member of the Missouri House of Representatives from the 116th district
- Incumbent
- Assumed office 2019
- Preceded by: Kevin P. Engler
- Succeeded by: Jason Green (elect)

Personal details
- Born: 1950 or 1951 (age 75–76) St. Louis, Missouri, U.S.
- Party: Republican
- Spouse: Denise
- Children: 3

Dale L. Wright (born 1950 or 1951) is an American politician. He is a member of the Missouri House of Representatives from the 116th District, serving since 2019. He is a member of the Republican party.

== Electoral history ==
Missouri House of Representatives Election, November 6, 2018, District 116
Party	Candidate	Votes	%	±%
Republican	Dale L. Wright	9,531	64.01%	−35.99
Democratic	Bill Kraemer	5,354	35.96%	+35.96
Write-In	Perry D. Wilmore	4	0.03%	+0.03
Total votes		14,899	100.00%	

Missouri House of Representatives Primary Election, August 4, 2020, District 116
Party	Candidate	Votes	%	±%
Republican	Dale Wright	3,779	58.60%	
Republican	Bryant Wolfin	2,670	41.40%	
Total votes		6,449	100.00%	

Missouri House of Representatives Election, November 3, 2020, District 116
Party	Candidate	Votes	%	±%
Republican	Dale Wright	15,739	100.00%	+35.99
Total votes		15,739	100.00%	

Missouri House of Representatives Election, November 8, 2022, District 116
Party	Candidate	Votes	%	±%
Republican	Dale Wright	8,956	100.00%	0.00
Total votes		8,956	100.00%	
