= Kent Haden =

American politician

Member of the Missouri House of Representatives from the 43rd district
- Incumbent
- Assumed office 2019
- Succeeded by: Brendan Webber (elect)

Personal details
- Born: 1950 or 1951 (age 75–76) Fulton, Missouri, U.S.
- Party: Republican
- Spouse: Brenda
- Children: 3
- Profession: Veterinarian

Kent Haden (born c. 1951) is an American politician. He is a member of the Missouri House of Representatives from the 43rd District, serving since 2019. He is a member of the Republican party.

Haden has twice proposed a bill to limit who can inspect farms in Missouri. His bill would mean that only state or federal agencies or the county sheriff could inspect facilities producing dairy products or raising livestock in the state. He first laid the bill in April 2019 but it died in the chamber. Haden laid the bill for a second time on 8 January 2020.

== Electoral history ==
Missouri House of Representatives Primary Election, August 7, 2018, District 43
Party	Candidate	Votes	%	±%
Republican	Kent Haden	3,636	78.68%	
Republican	Ed Lockwood	498	10.78%	
Republican	Adela Falk	487	10.54%	
Total votes		4,621	100.00%	

Missouri House of Representatives Election, November 6, 2018, District 43
Party	Candidate	Votes	%	±%
Republican	Kent Haden	9,143	72.65%	
Democratic	Jamie Blair	3,442	27.35%	
Total votes		12,585	100.00%	

Missouri House of Representatives Election, November 3, 2020, District 43
Party	Candidate	Votes	%	±%
Republican	Kent Haden	13,641	100.00%	+27.35
Total votes		13,641	100.00%	

Missouri House of Representatives Election, November 8, 2022, District 43
Party	Candidate	Votes	%	±%
Republican	Kent Haden	10,615	100.00%	0.00
Total votes		10,615	100.00%	
