= Dave Hinman =

American politician

Member of the Missouri House of Representatives from the 103rd district
- Incumbent
- Assumed office 2022
- Preceded by: John Wiemann

Personal details
- Party: Republican
- Education: Iowa State University

Dave Hinman is an American politician serving in the Missouri House of Representatives. He won his first election from district 103 in 2022.

== Early life and education ==
Hinman was born in Alabama and grew up in Iowa. He graduated from Iowa State University with a bachelor's degree in Hotel, Restaurant, and Institution Management.

== Career ==
Hinman worked for the QuikTrip corporation for 35 years. He also has a family farm.

Hinman was elected alderman of O'Fallon city council ward 1 in 2001. He was elected President Pro Tempore, and also served on the Planning and Zoning Commission, the Fire Protection District board of directors, and as president of the St. Charles County Municipal League. He is a member of the O'Fallon Elks Lodge and Knights of Columbus.

=== Missouri House of Representatives ===
Hinman consulted with Axiom Strategies for his 2022 campaign.

In 2024, Hinman sponsored a bill to eliminate an approval process for child labor in Missouri. The existing process requires children ages 14 and 15 to have work roles and hours approved through a certificate signed by their school and the department of labor to ensure that conditions are not hazardous or conflict with student educational needs. Hinman initially filed the bill because a restaurant in his district had difficulty staffing later hours, however federal law does not allow children under 16 to work after 7pm.

In 2026, Hinman sponsored a bill to impose a statewide ban on intoxicating hemp products. Members of the Missouri Hemp Trade Association oppose the bill, saying that it would effectively wipe out their industry. Governor Mike Kehoe, who expressed support for the legislation, received 10,000 handwritten letters requesting he veto the bill. Regulations on hemp products, particularly CBD, have been debated since statewide cannabis legalization and also debated on a federal level.

== Electoral history ==
=== State representative ===
Missouri House of Representatives Primary Election, August 2, 2022, District 103
Party	Candidate	Votes	%	±%
Republican	Duell Wayne Lauderdale	1,511	45.7%	
Republican	Dave Hinman	1,797	54.3%	
Total votes		3,308	100.0%	

Missouri House of Representatives Election, November 8, 2022, District 103
Party	Candidate	Votes	%	±%
Republican	Dave Hinman	9,056	100.0%	
Total votes		9,056	100.0%	
