= Wendy Hausman =

American politician

Member of the Missouri House of Representatives from the 65th district
- Incumbent
- Assumed office January 4, 2023
- Preceded by: Tom Hannegan

Personal details
- Born: Belleville, Illinois, U.S.
- Party: Republican
- Education: Roxana High School
- Alma mater: Eastern Illinois University
- Website: www.wendyhausman.com

Wendy Hausman is an American politician serving as a Republican member of the Missouri House of Representatives, representing the state's 65th House district.

Hausman works as the director of marketing and public relations for a locally owned marketing company in St. Peters.
