= Keith Elliott (politician) =

American politician

Member of the Missouri House of Representatives from the 153rd district
- Incumbent
- Assumed office January 8, 2025
- Preceded by: Darrell Atchison

Personal details
- Born: Poplar Bluff, Missouri, U.S.
- Party: Republican

Keith Elliott is an American politician who was elected member of the Missouri House of Representatives for the 153rd district in 2024.

Elliott worked nearly 30 years at the Missouri Department of Transportation. He has experience as a local small business owner and rancher. He served on the Doniphan R-I school board for 15 years.
