= Dane Diehl =

American politician

Member of the Missouri House of Representatives from the 125th district
- Incumbent
- Assumed office 2022

Personal details
- Born: Kansas City, Missouri, U.S.
- Party: Republican
- Education: University of Missouri

Dane Diehl is an American politician serving in the Missouri House of Representatives. He won his first election from district 125 in 2022, and won re-election in 2024.

== Early life and education ==
Diehl was born in Kansas City, Missouri, and graduated from Butler R-V High School in 2009. He completed a bachelor's degree in Agricultural system management from University of Missouri in 2013.

== Career ==
=== Agriculture ===
Diehl raises corn and soybeans on his family farm, as well as a cow–calf operation and feedlot.

Diehl is the District 4 Director of the Missouri Soybean Association, and is also a member of Missouri Corn, the Missouri Cattlemen's Association, Missouri Farm Bureau, the Nevada Elks Lodge, and the Butler Chamber of Commerce.

=== Missouri House of Representatives ===
Diehl represents district 125, comprising Bates, Vernon, and Cedar counties.

In 2024, Diehl worked with Bayer to introduce legislation in the Missouri House that would protect pesticide companies from legal liability from claims that products such as Roundup cause cancer. Diehl argued that costs associated with lawsuits could cause Bayer to pull products from the US market. Similar bills were introduced in Iowa and Idaho, with legal experts warning of broader impacts. Bayer increased lobbyists in Missouri over the previous year and also leads an advertising campaign with Modern Ag Alliance saying that litigation costs threatened the availability of glyphosate. The bill received opposition from fellow Republicans and from a Democratic Representative who had suffered from cancer shortly before.

== Electoral history ==
=== State representatives ===
Missouri House of Representatives Primary Election, August 2, 2022, District 125
Party	Candidate	Votes	%	±%
Republican	Andrew Hurt	936	12.8%	
Republican	Dane Diehl	5,100	69.5%	
Republican	Dennis Turner	1,297	17.7%	
Total votes		7,333	100.00%	

Missouri House of Representatives Election, November 8, 2022, District 125
Party	Candidate	Votes	%	±%
Republican	Dane Diehl	10,609	86.1%	
Libertarian	Robert E. Smith	1,710	13.9%	
Total votes		12,319	100.00%	
