= Yolonda Fountain Henderson =

American politician

Member of the Missouri House of Representatives from the 85th district
- Incumbent
- Assumed office January 4, 2023
- Preceded by: Kevin Windham Jr.

Mayor of Jennings
- In office 2015 – May 24, 2016
- Preceded by: Benjamin Sutphin
- Succeeded by: Francine Dugger

Personal details
- Born: c. 1964 (age 61–62) St. Louis, Missouri, U.S.
- Party: Democratic

Yolonda Fountain Henderson (born c. 1965) is an American politician. She has served as a member of the Missouri House of Representatives from the 85th district since 2023. A member of the Democratic Party, she previously served as mayor of Jennings, Missouri, between 2015 and 2016.

== Political career ==
Henderson served as president of the Jennings, Missouri school board before serving as the first African-American female city councilwoman for Jennings.

=== Mayor of Jennings ===
Henderson was elected mayor of the city of Jennings in April 2015. Shortly after being sworn in as mayor, she filed a lawsuit against the city council and several top city officials.

In February 2016, articles of impeachment were written, which cited 19 allegations against Henderson; it was down to 12 by the time of her impeachment. On May 24, the city council voted to impeach Henderson through a unanimous vote. Francine Dugger succeeded her as mayor pro tempore.

=== Missouri House of Representatives ===
Henderson was elected to the Missouri House of Representatives in 2022. She was unopposed in the general election.

== Electoral history ==
2022 Missouri House of Representatives election, District 85
Primary election
Party	Candidate	Votes	%
Democratic	Yolonda Fountain Henderson	1,885	53.08
Democratic	Yonnee Fortson	1,190	33.51
Democratic	Donovan Meeks	476	13.41
Total votes		3,551	100.00
General election
Democratic	Yolonda Fountain Henderson	7,026	100.00
Total votes		7,026	100.00
