= Mitch Boggs =

American politician

Member of the Missouri House of Representatives from the 157th district
- Incumbent
- Assumed office January 6, 2021
- Preceded by: Mike Moon

Personal details
- Party: Republican

Mitchell Boggs is an American politician currently serving in the Missouri House of Representatives from Missouri's 157th district. He won the seat unanimously after no other candidate ran against him. He was sworn in on January 6, 2021.
