= David Dolan (politician) =

American politician

Member of the Missouri House of Representatives from the 148th district
- Incumbent
- Assumed office January 8, 2025
- Preceded by: Jamie Burger

Personal details
- Born: Memphis, Tennessee, US
- Party: Republican
- Other political affiliations: Democrat 2018 and before
- Education: University of Memphis
- Website: www.daviddolanformo.com

David Dolan is an American judge and politician who was elected member of the Missouri House of Representatives for the 148th district in 2024.

Born in Memphis, he previously practiced law in Tennessee and served as a prosecuting attorney and as an associate circuit judge in both Scott and Mississippi counties in Missouri. In March 1998, he was appointed a circuit judge for the 33rd Judicial Circuit Court of Missouri. Dolan is a graduate of the University of Memphis School of Law.
