= Justin Sparks =

American politician

Member of the Missouri House of Representatives from the 110th district
- In office January 4, 2023 – November 25, 2025
- Preceded by: Dottie Bailey
- Succeeded by: Niles Stephens (Jan. 6, 2027)

Personal details
- Born: St. Louis, Missouri, U.S.
- Party: Republican
- Education: Oral Roberts University; Southern Illinois University Edwardsville
- Website: https://www.sparksformissouri.com/

Justin Sparks is an American politician who served as a Republican member of the Missouri House of Representatives, representing the state's 110th House district from 2023 to 2025. Sparks was born in St. Louis and attended Granite City High School. With a career in law enforcement, he was first elected in 2022. Sparks resigned in November 2025 to take a job with the U.S. Department of Homeland Security.

While in the Missouri state House, he served as the Vice Chair of the Missouri Freedom Caucus.
