= Lisa Durnell =

American politician

Member of the Missouri House of Representatives from the 154th district
- Incumbent
- Assumed office January 8, 2025
- Succeeded by: David Evans

Personal details
- Party: Republican
- Education: University of Missouri
- Website: durnellfordistrict154.com

Lisa Williamson Durnell is an American politician who was elected member of the Missouri House of Representatives for the 154th district in 2024. She succeeded David Evans who retired after three terms.

Durnell is a graduate of the University of Missouri. She and her husband are cattle farmers. Durnell is a member of the Missouri Firearms Coalition and the National Rifle Association of America.
