= Marty Joe Murray =

American politician (born 1989)

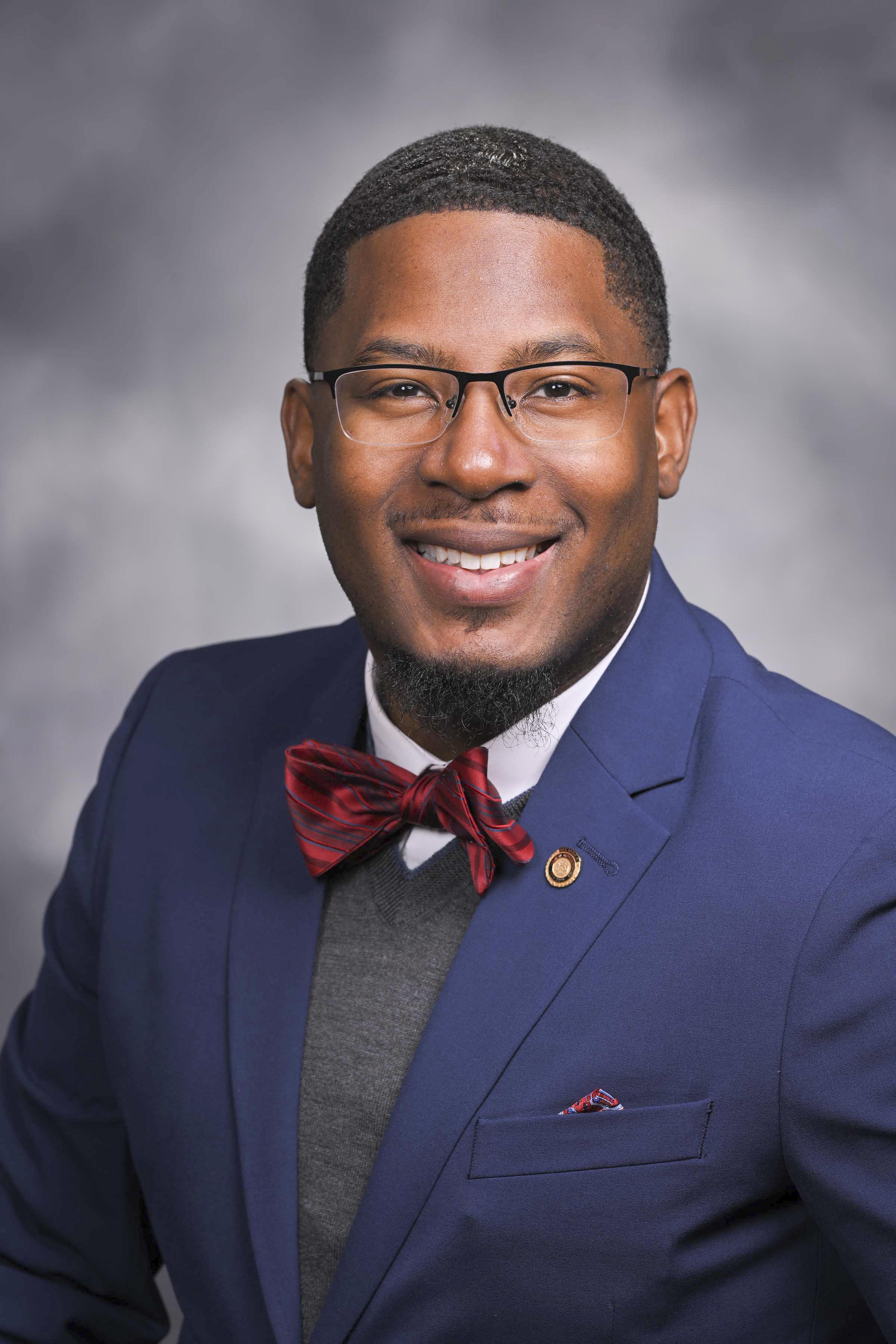
- Murray in 2024

Member of the Missouri House of Representatives from the 78th district
- Incumbent
- Assumed office January 8, 2025
- Succeeded by: Rasheen Aldridge

Personal details
- Party: Democratic
- Education: University of Missouri; Southern Illinois University Carbondale
- Website: martyjoemurray.com

Marty Joe Murray Jr (born 1989) is an American politician who was elected as a member of the Missouri House of Representatives for the 78th district in 2024. Murray spent the majority of his professional career working in Project Management and Business Analytics in Corporate America. Murray became the youngest member of the Project Management Institute's Metro St. Louis chapter to obtain a Project Management Professional (PMP) certification. In 2020 he was recognized by the PMIMSL Chapter for the Emerging Leader Award.

== Education ==
Murray attended Thornwood High School lettering in varsity at tailback his sophomore year. He later transferred to Eisenhower High School (Decatur, Illinois) and graduated in 2007.

In 2023 Murray was recognized for the Young Alumni Achievement Award. As a graduate from Southern Illinois University Carbondale's College of Business and Analytics, Murray, a first-generation college student, held campus leadership positions in organizations including Undergraduate Student Government, Black Affairs Council and the Paul Simon Public Policy Institute. During his time with the Paul Simon Institute, he served as ambassador and was awarded the Vince Demuzio Governmental Internship, where he worked for then-Illinois Attorney General Lisa Madigan. In 2015, Murray became the youngest person ever enrolled in the Executive MBA program at the University of Missouri where he received his master’s in business administration.

== Career ==
In August 2016, Marty beat a 23-year incumbent for the 7th ward Democratic Committeeman seat. Shortly after the election he was elected as the Chairman of Missouri’s 78th legislative district committee, Vice Chair of the 1st congressional district committee and State Committeeman representing Missouri’s 5th Senatorial District to the Missouri Democratic Party. Murray became an elected member of the Missouri House of Representatives for the 78th district in 2024.

In 2025m Murray served on several committees including Administration and Accounts, Budget, Financial Institutions, and Subcommittee on Appropriations - General Administration.

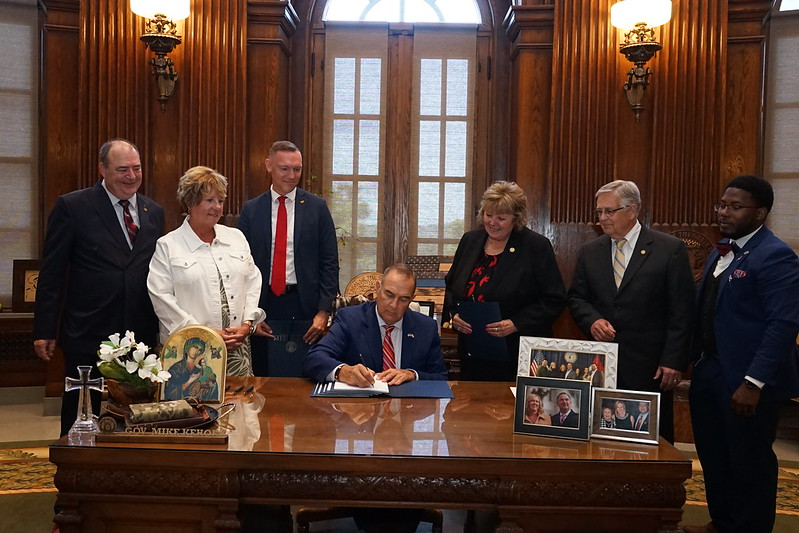
Left to Right: Rep. Doug Clemens, Rep. Gretchen Bangert, Rep. Philip Oehlerking, Gov. Mike Kehoe, Senator Sandy Crawford, Rep. Bill Owen, Rep. Marty Joe Murray

During his freshman term in office he amended Senate Bill 98 (Crawford) to include a provision that strengthens employee protections and supports small businesses. Murray also partnered with Republican Representative Travis Wilson in a bipartisan effort to introduce an "office-conversion" tax-credit bill. At a House hearing, the duo highlighted widespread support from development, business and municipal sectors for a proposal to offer a 25% tax credit for converting large, long-vacant office buildings into residential, retail or mixed commercial uses. This move aimed at revitalizing downtown St. Louis and other Missouri communities. The bill's intent was to address the commercial vacancy that was accelerated by the global pandemic and rise in remote work.
