= John Voss (politician) =

American politician

Member of the Missouri House of Representatives from the 147th district
- Incumbent
- Assumed office January 4, 2023
- Preceded by: Wayne Wallingford

Personal details
- Party: Republican
- Education: Missouri University of Science and Technology
- Website: https://johnvoss.org/

John Voss is an American politician serving as a Republican member of the Missouri House of Representatives, representing the state's 147th House district.

== Career ==
Voss is a Cape Girardeau businessman. In the 2022 Missouri House of Representatives election, Voss was elected in District 147.
