= Scott Cupps =

American politician

Member of the Missouri House of Representatives from the 158th district
- Incumbent
- Assumed office January 5, 2020
- Preceded by: Scott Fitzpatrick

Personal details
- Party: Republican

Scott Cupps is an American politician serving as a member of the Missouri House of Representatives from the 158th district. Elected in November 2019, he assumed office on January 5, 2020.

== Personal life ==
Cupps in a native of Shell Knob, Missouri. Prior to entering politics, Cupps owned and operated a farm.

== Political career ==
Cupps was elected to the Missouri House of Representatives in a 2019 special election after Scott Fitzpatrick resigned from office to serve as the 47th treasurer of Missouri.

Cupps was appointed chair of the House legislative rules committee by Jon Patterson in 2024. In 2025, he was criticized for using a Bingo spinner for selecting bills to advance to chamber.
