= Bill Allen (Missouri politician) =

American politician

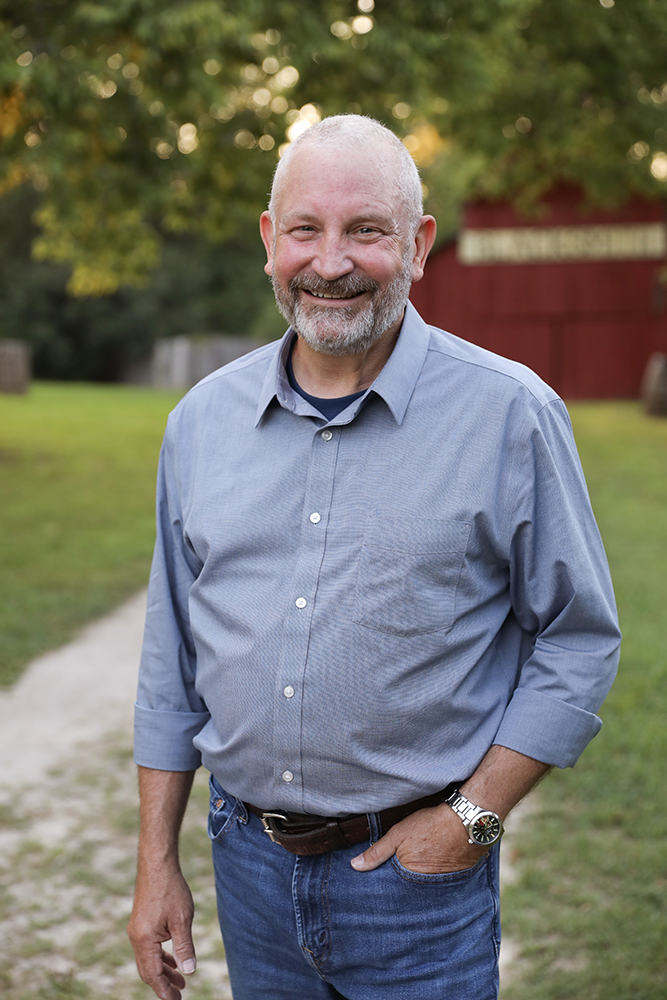

Member of the Missouri House of Representatives from the 17th district
- Incumbent
- Assumed office January 4, 2023
- Preceded by: Mark Ellebracht

Personal details
- Born: November 3, 1965 (age 60) Kansas City, Kansas, U.S.
- Party: Republican
- Education: Embry–Riddle Aeronautical University; Troy University; Capella University

Bill Allen (born November 3, 1965) is an American politician and retired United States Navy officer serving as a Republican member of the Missouri House of Representatives from the 17th district since 2023. The district covers part of Clay County, including the Northland section of Kansas City, Pleasant Valley, Claycomo, Randolph, and Birmingham. Allen defeated incumbent Democrat Mark Ellebracht in 2022.

== Early life and career ==
Allen grew up in Kansas City, Kansas, in the Turner School District, in a single-parent household below the poverty line. At 16 he was sent to a children's home in Arkansas.

Allen enlisted in the United States Navy and later earned a commission through Officer Candidate School, retiring as a Lieutenant Commander after nearly 26 years of active duty. He subsequently worked for the U.S. Department of Labor's Job Corps program, where he led the Navy Junior Reserve Officers' Training Corps program at the Excelsior Springs Job Corps Center and served as Center Director at campuses in Missouri and North Dakota.

Allen then worked in higher education administration, serving as professor, dean, provost, and vice chancellor. He worked in administration at the University of Arkansas Grantham, an online institution, from 2020 to 2024.

== Committee Assignments (2025-26) ==
- Vice-Chairman - Pensions
- Vice-Chairman - Special Committee on Tourism
- Higher Education and Workforce Development
- Insurance
- Professional Registration and Licensing
- Special Committee on Urban Issues

== Committee Assignments (2023-24) ==
- Vice-Chair - Special Committee on Homeland Security
- Crime Prevention and Public Safety
- Economic Development
- Higher Education
- Special Committee on Property Tax Reform
- Special Interim Committee on Illegal Immigrant Crimes

== Election results ==
Missouri House of Representatives Election, November 8, 2022, District 17
Party	Candidate	Votes	%	±%
Republican	Bill Allen	5,785	50.21	
Democratic	Mark Ellebracht (incumbent)	5,736	49.79	
Total votes		11,521	100.00	

Missouri House of Representatives Election, November 5, 2024, District 17
Party	Candidate	Votes	%	±%
Republican	Bill Allen (incumbent)	8,992	51.84	+1.63
Democratic	Shirley Mata	8,353	48.16	−1.63
Total votes		17,345	100.00	
