= Travis Wilson (politician) =

American politician

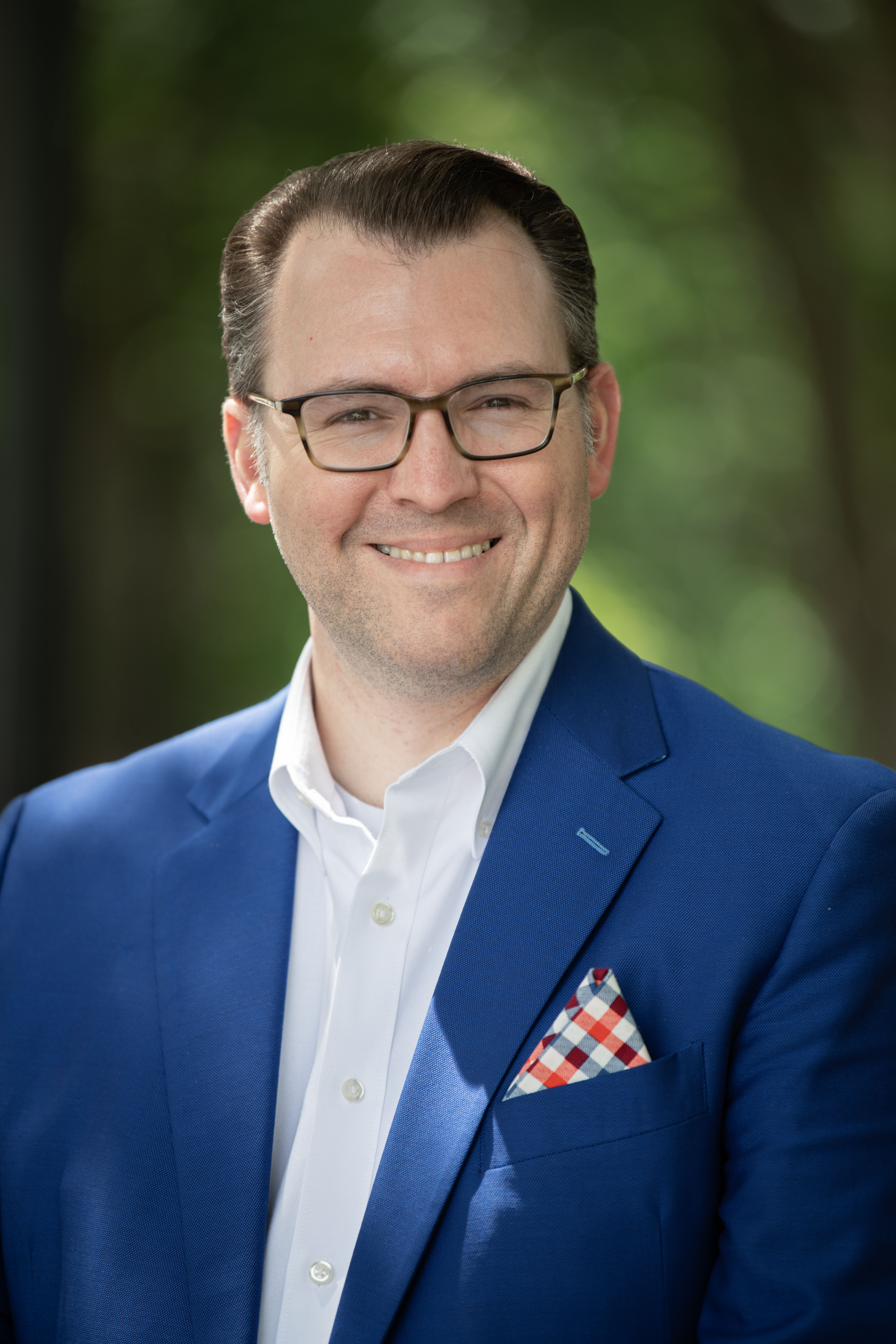

Member of the Missouri House of Representatives from the 106th district
- Incumbent
- Assumed office January 4, 2023
- Preceded by: Adam Schwadron (redistricting)
- Succeeded by: Jewel Kelly Jr. (elect)

Personal details
- Born: Creve Coeur, Missouri, U.S.
- Party: Republican
- Education: Francis Howell North High School
- Alma mater: University of Missouri, St. Louis
- Website: https://www.wilsonforstc.com/

Travis Wilson is an American politician serving as a Republican member of the Missouri House of Representatives from the 106th district since 2023. The district covers part of St. Charles County. He succeeded Adam Schwadron, who was drawn into the neighboring 105th district under the post-2020 census map.

== Early life and education ==
Wilson was born in Creve Coeur, Missouri, and lives in St. Charles. He graduated from Francis Howell North High School in 2001 and earned a bachelor's degree in marketing from the University of Missouri–St. Louis in 2009.

== Career ==
Wilson worked as a business liaison for the St. Louis County Department of Workforce Development from 2011 to 2014, then as an economic development specialist for the City of St. Charles from 2014 to 2019. He also worked in economic development for the City of Florissant. In 2019 he received the Missouri Economic Development Council's Business Retention Award, recognizing 4,000 business visits conducted in St. Charles between 2015 and 2019.

Wilson is a licensed real estate agent. He is a member of the St. Charles County Association of Realtors, the Missouri Economic Development Council, the Heartland Regional Investment Fund, and the Hawthorn Foundation, and is a 2017 graduate of the VISION St. Charles County leadership program.

== Legislative Service ==
In 2026 Wilson sponsored House Bill 2151, which would raise the income eligibility caps for the Fast Track Workforce Incentive Grant, a state program supporting adults pursuing education in high-demand fields. The bill would increase the cap from $40,000 to $50,000 for individuals and from $80,000 to $100,000 for married couples filing jointly, with the threshold subsequently indexed to inflation. A companion measure, Senate Bill 1451, was sponsored by Mike Henderson.

== Committee Assignments (2025-26) ==
- Vice-Chairman - Commerce
- Economic Development
- Higher Education and Workforce Development
- Special Committee on Tourism

== Committee Assignments (2023-24) ==
- Economic Development
- Special Committee on Government Accountability
- Workforce and Infrastructure Development
