= Gregg Bush =

American politician

Member of the Missouri House of Representatives from the 50th district
- Incumbent
- Assumed office January 8, 2025
- Preceded by: Douglas Mann

Personal details
- Party: Democratic
- Education: Illinois Wesleyan University University of Missouri
- Website: greggbushformo.org

Gregg Bush is an American politician who was elected member of the Missouri House of Representatives for the 50th district in 2024.

Bush worked for many years as a nurse. Bush is a member of the Unitarian Universalist Church.
