= Mike Costlow =

American politician

Member of the Missouri House of Representatives from the 108th district
- Incumbent
- Assumed office January 8, 2025
- Preceded by: Justin Hicks

Personal details
- Party: Republican
- Website: https://costlowformissouri.com/

Michael Costlow is an American politician who was elected member of the Missouri House of Representatives for the 108th district in 2024.

Costlow was raised in Jacksonville, Florida. In 2005, he graduated from Lowndes County High School. In 2018, he received a Master of Business Administration from Western Governors University.

He was Alderman of Dardenne Prairie. A lawsuit against his candidacy for state house was rejected in May 2024.
