= Burt Whaley =

American politician

Member of the Missouri House of Representatives from the 138th district
- Incumbent
- Assumed office January 8, 2025
- Preceded by: Brad Hudson

Personal details
- Born: Moberly, Missouri, U.S.
- Party: Republican
- Education: Central Missouri State University
- Website: https://whaley4mo138th.org/

Burt Whaley is an American politician who was elected member of the Missouri House of Representatives for the 138th district in 2024.

Whaley had a 28-year career in education including roles as a biology teacher, administrator, and as principal. He served in the United States Army and Army Reserves.

While campaigning he suffered serious injury, leading him to use a wheelchair for mobility. He regained his ability to walk by the beginning of the legislative session.
