= Tara Peters =

American politician

Member of the Missouri House of Representatives from the 122nd district
- Incumbent
- Assumed office January 4, 2023
- Preceded by: Bill Hardwick (redistricting)

Personal details
- Born: Valparaiso, Indiana, U.S.
- Party: Republican
- Education: Purdue University
- Website: tarapeters.net

Tara J. Peters is an American politician serving as a Republican member of the Missouri House of Representatives, representing the state's 122nd House district.

== Early life ==
Peters was born in Valparaiso, Indiana.

== Career ==
Peters is a realtor and pumpkin patch owner.

== Personal life ==
Peters resides in Rolla with her husband and their two sons.
