= Jim Schulte =

American politician

Member of the Missouri House of Representatives from the 49th district
- Incumbent
- Assumed office January 4, 2023
- Preceded by: Travis Fitzwater

Personal details
- Born: St. Louis, Missouri, U.S.
- Party: Republican
- Education: Tarkio College

Jim Schulte is an American politician serving as a Republican member of the Missouri House of Representatives, representing the state's 49th House district.

Schulte is a Missouri National Guard veteran. In the 2022 Missouri House of Representatives election, Schulte was elected in District 49.
