= Tony Harbison =

American politician

Member of the Missouri House of Representatives from the 144th district
- Incumbent
- Assumed office January 8, 2025
- Preceded by: Chris Dinkins

Personal details
- Party: Republican

Tony Harbison is an American politician who was elected member of the Missouri House of Representatives for the 144th district in 2024.

He is chair of the Soil and Water Board and the Republican Central Committee in Iron County.

Harbison is a father of two and grandfather of six.
