= Will Jobe =

American politician

Member-elect of the Missouri House of Representatives from the 21st district
- Assuming office January 8, 2025
- Succeeding: Robert Sauls

Personal details
- Party: Democratic
- Education: University of Missouri–Kansas City School of Law

Will Jobe is an American politician. He is the member-elect for the 21st district of the Missouri House of Representatives.

== Life and career ==
Jobe attended the University of Missouri–Kansas City School of Law.

In November 2024, Jobe defeated Marjain Breitenbach in the general election for the 21st district of the Missouri House of Representatives, winning 51 percent of the votes. He succeeded Robert Sauls. He assumes office on January 8, 2025.
