= Tiffany Price =

American politician

Member of the Missouri House of Representatives from the 26th district
- Incumbent
- Assumed office January 8, 2025
- Preceded by: Ashley Bland Manlove

Personal details
- Party: Democratic

Tiffany Price is an American politician who was elected member of the Missouri House of Representatives for the 26th district in 2024.

Price is the founder and executive director of the Hold Em Up 4 Care non-profit. She earned her associate of arts degree from MCCKC-Longview.

Price is the mother of four sons.
