= Kem Smith =

American politician

Member of the Missouri House of Representatives from the 68th district
- Incumbent
- Assumed office January 8, 2025
- Succeeded by: Jay Mosley

Personal details
- Party: Democratic
- Website: www.drkemformo.com

Kem Smith is an American politician who is a member of the Missouri House of Representatives from the 68th district, serving since January 2025. She was elected in 2024.

Smith is an educator. She is a graduate of Hazelwood Central High School, Fontbonne University and Lindenwood University.

Smith and her husband have five children. She is also a grandmother.
