= Ken Jamison =

American politician

Member of the Missouri House of Representatives from the 15th district
- Incumbent
- Assumed office January 8, 2025
- Succeeded by: Maggie Nurrenbern

Personal details
- Party: Democratic
- Website: kenjamison.com

Kenneth Jamison is an American politician who was elected member of the Missouri House of Representatives for the 15th district in 2024.

Jamieson graduated from the University of Missouri and the University of Missouri School of Law. He served four years on active duty in the United States Marine Corps and served one tour in Afghanistan. Jamison is a Baptist.

== Missouri House of Representatives ==
In March 2025, Jamison was one of seven House Democrats to vote for state takeover of St. Louis Metropolitan Police Department.
