= Willard Haley =

American politician

Member of the Missouri House of Representatives from the 58th District
- Incumbent
- Assumed office January 6, 2021
- Preceded by: David Wood

Personal details
- Born: Boonville, Missouri, U.S.
- Party: Republican
- Education: University of Missouri

Willard Haley is an American politician currently serving in the Missouri House of Representatives from Missouri's 58th district. He won the seat unanimously after no other candidate ran in the election. He was sworn in on January 6, 2021.

== Electoral history ==
Missouri House of Representatives Primary Election, August 4, 2020, District 58
Party	Candidate	Votes	%	±%
Republican	Willard Haley	3,853	67.32%	
Republican	Timothy Faber	1,870	32.68%	
Total votes		5,723	100.00%	

Missouri House of Representatives Election, November 3, 2020, District 58
Party	Candidate	Votes	%	±%
Republican	Willard Haley	13,689	100.00%	
Total votes		13,689	100.00%	

Missouri House of Representatives Primary Election, August 2, 2022, District 58
Party	Candidate	Votes	%	±%
Republican	Willard Haley	4,223	72.08%	+4.76
Republican	Casey Pemberton	1,636	27.92%	n/a
Total votes		5,859	100.00%	

Missouri House of Representatives Election, November 8, 2022, District 58
Party	Candidate	Votes	%	±%
Republican	Willard Haley	10,525	100.00%	0.00
Total votes		10,525	100.00%	
