= Jeff Coleman (Missouri politician) =

American politician (born 1963)

Member of the Missouri House of Representatives from the 32nd district
- Incumbent
- Assumed office 2019
- Preceded by: Jeanie Lauer
- Succeeded by: Michael Todd (elect)

Personal details
- Born: May 20, 1963 (age 63) Independence, Missouri, U.S.
- Party: Republican
- Spouse: Debbie
- Children: 7
- Profession: insurance broker

Jeffrey L. Coleman (born 1963) is an American politician. He is a member of the Missouri House of Representatives from the 32nd District, serving since 2019. He is a member of the Democratic party.

== Electoral history ==
- Jeff Coleman has not yet had any opponents in the Republican primaries he has entered, thus getting nominated by default each time.

Missouri House of Representatives Election, November 6, 2018, District 32
Party	Candidate	Votes	%	±%
Republican	Jeff Coleman	9,074	60.69%	
Democratic	Janice Brill	5,877	39.31%	
Total votes		14,951	100.00%	

Missouri House of Representatives Election, November 3, 2020, District 32
Party	Candidate	Votes	%	±%
Republican	Jeff Coleman	17,129	100.00%	+39.31
Total votes		17,129	100.00%	

Missouri House of Representatives Election, November 8, 2022, District 32
Party	Candidate	Votes	%	±%
Republican	Jeff Coleman	9,045	69.38%	−30.62
Democratic	Janice Brill	3,991	30.62%	+30.62
Total votes		13,036	100.00%	
