= Scott Miller (Missouri politician) =

American politician

Member of the Missouri House of Representatives from the 69th district
- Incumbent
- Assumed office January 8, 2025
- Preceded by: Adam Schnelting

Personal details
- Born: Missouri, U.S.
- Party: Republican
- Spouse: Michelle
- Children: 2
- Education: University of Missouri–St. Louis; Washington University in St. Louis; Indiana University Bloomington
- Profession: Small business owner

Military service
- Branch/service: United States Army, US Army Reserve, Missouri National Guard
- Rank: Specialist E-4

Scott Miller is an American politician from St. Charles County, Missouri. He was elected to represent district 69 in the Missouri House of Representatives on November 5, 2024, and assumed office on January 8, 2025.

== Early life and education ==
Miller graduated from Pattonville High School in 1989. He has a Bachelor of Arts degree from University of Missouri – St. Louis, Master of Science degree in Telecommunications management from Washington University in St. Louis, and an Master of Business Administration and MS degree in Strategic management from the Kelley School of Business at Indiana University Bloomington.

== Career ==
Miller served in the United States Army, US Army Reserve, and the Missouri National Guard in field artillery and combat engineers. He worked for Boeing before starting a home cleaning business in 2013.

=== House of Representatives ===
In 2025, Miller filed an exemption to a popular initiative amendment to raise the minimum wage. His bill would make workers under the age of 21 ineligible for state minimum wage, exempt businesses with fewer than 50 employees, and add rules to permit businesses to reduce wages for employees who don't provide at least two weeks notice or violate provisions of the workplace handbook.
