= Jeff Hales =

American politician

Member of the Missouri House of Representatives from the 86th district
- Incumbent
- Assumed office January 8, 2025
- Succeeded by: Joe Adams

Personal details
- Born: Clayton, Missouri, U.S.
- Party: Democratic
- Website: halesformissouri.co

Jeff Hales is an American politician who was elected member of the Missouri House of Representatives for the 86th district in 2024.

Hales was born and raised in Clayton, Missouri. He was a member of the city council in University City.
