= Kemp Strickler =

American politician

Member of the Missouri House of Representatives from the 34th district
- Incumbent
- Assumed office January 4, 2023
- Preceded by: Rick Roeber

Personal details
- Born: Kansas City, Missouri, U.S.
- Party: Democratic
- Education: University of Missouri
- Website: https://www.kempstrickler.com/

Kemp Strickler is an American politician serving as a Democratic member of the Missouri House of Representatives, representing the state's 34th House district.

== Early life ==
Strickler was born in Harrisonville, Missouri and raised in Kansas City, Missouri.

== Career ==
Before becoming a legislator, Strickler worked as a data analytics manager.
