= Mark Boyko =

American politician from Missouri

Member of the Missouri House of Representatives from the 90th district
- Incumbent
- Assumed office January 8, 2025
- Succeeded by: Barbara Phifer

Personal details
- Born: Fort Knox, Kentucky, U.S.
- Party: Democratic
- Education: University of Illinois Urbana-Champaign; University of Missouri; New York University School of Law
- Website: https://markboyko.com/

Mark Boyko is an American politician who was elected member of the Missouri House of Representatives for the 90th district in 2024.

Boyko is an attorney at law. Before his election to the state legislature he was a school board member.

== Missouri House of Representatives ==
In March 2025, Boyko was one of seven House Democrats to vote for state takeover of St. Louis Metropolitan Police Department.
