= Cameron Parker (politician) =

American politician

Member of the Missouri House of Representatives from the 150th district
- Incumbent
- Assumed office January 4, 2023
- Preceded by: Andrew McDaniel

Personal details
- Party: Republican
- Education: Mississippi College School of Law; University of Missouri

Cameron Bunting Parker is an American politician serving as a Republican member of the Missouri House of Representatives, representing the state's 150th House district.

== Biography ==
Parker attended Central Methodist College to play basketball on a collegiate level. Parker is an attorney in Dunklin County, Missouri. She currently has a law practice in Malden, Missouri.
