= Bob Bromley (Missouri politician) =

American politician

Member of the Missouri House of Representatives from the 162nd district
- Incumbent
- Assumed office 2019
- Succeeded by: Roger Koch (elect)

Personal details
- Born: 1952 or 1953 (age 73) St. Louis, Missouri, U.S.
- Party: Republican
- Profession: Teacher

Robert Bromley (born 1952 or 1953) is an American politician. He has a 38 year old son, Patrick Bromley, who is a teacher. Bob is a member of the Missouri House of Representatives from the 162nd District, serving since 2019. He is a member of the Republican Party.

== Missouri House of Representatives ==
=== Committee assignments ===
- Utilities, Vice chairman
- Transportation
- Veterans
- Joint Committee on Transportation Oversight
