= Bryant Wolfin =

American politician

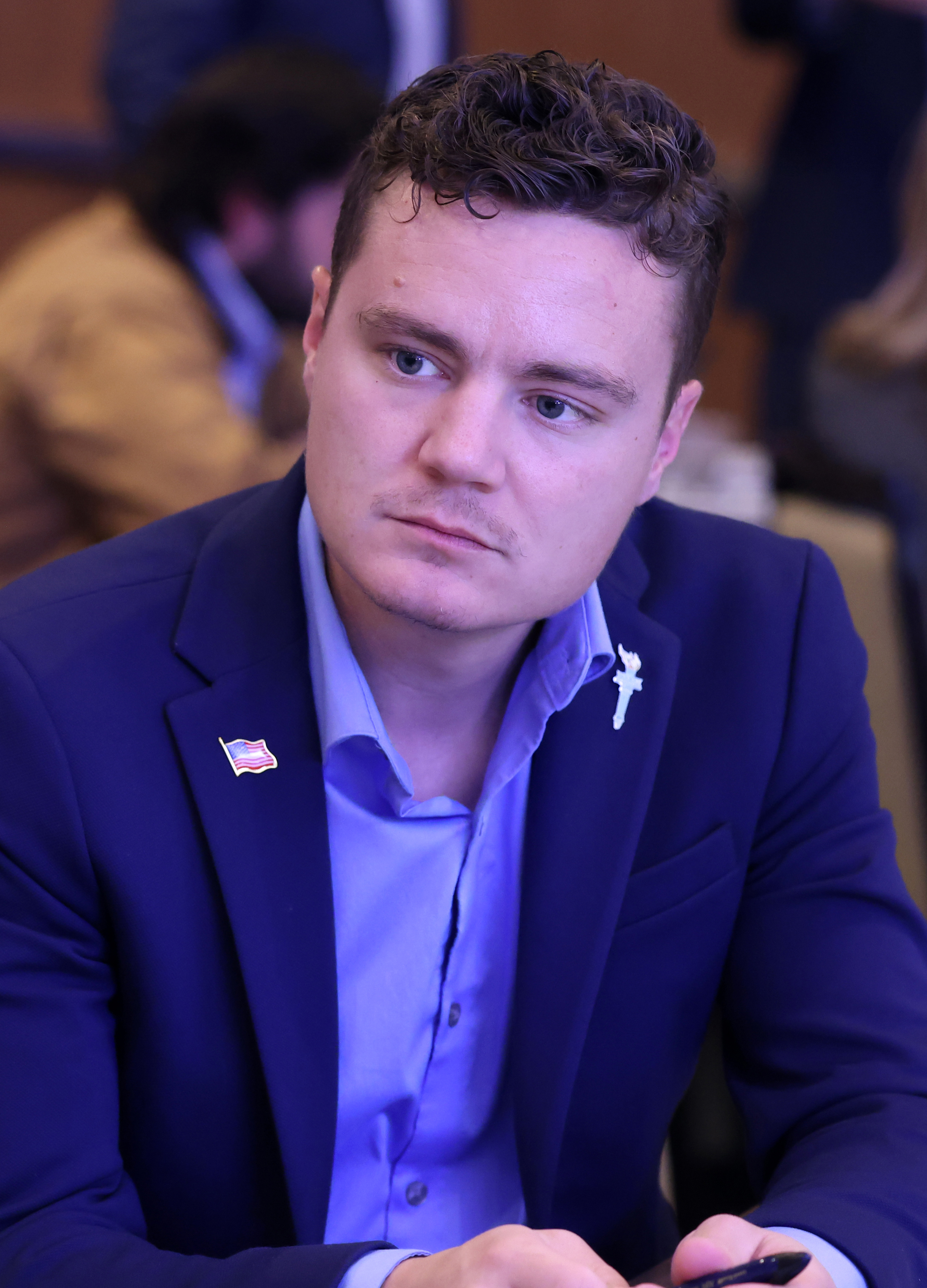
- Wolfin in 2024

Member of the Missouri House of Representatives from the 145th district
- Incumbent
- Assumed office January 8, 2025
- Preceded by: Rick Francis

Personal details
- Party: Republican
- Education: Mineral Area College

Bryant Thomas Wolfin is an American politician who was elected member of the Missouri House of Representatives for the 145th district in 2024.

Wolfin is a graduate of Mineral Area College. He owns and operates two convenience stores in St. Mary and Fredericktown.

Wolfin is a Baptist. He is married and has three children.

In 2025, Wolfin was awarded the Granite Plaque Award by the Locke & Smith Foundation for the most constitutional voting record in the Missouri House of Representatives, leading his closest opponent by 15.08%.
