= Marla Smith =

American politician

Member of the Missouri House of Representatives from the 74th district
- Incumbent
- Assumed office January 8, 2025
- Succeeded by: Kevin Windham Jr.

Personal details
- Party: Democratic

Marla Smith is an American politician who was elected member of the Missouri House of Representatives for the 74th district in 2024.

Smith is a former Pagedale alderwoman. She has three children and ten grandchildren.
