= Melissa Douglas =

American politician

Member of the Missouri House of Representatives from the 27th district
- Incumbent
- Assumed office January 8, 2025
- Preceded by: Richard Brown

Personal details
- Party: Democratic

Melissa Douglas is an American politician who was elected member of the Missouri House of Representatives for the 27th district in 2024.

In the legislature, Douglas serves on the Budget committee and the committee on Professional Registration and Licensing.

Douglas is active at Spruce Saint Matthew Baptist Church in Kansas City.
