= Pattie Mansur =

American politician

Member of the Missouri House of Representatives from the 25th district
- Incumbent
- Assumed office January 8, 2025
- Succeeded by: Patty Lewis

Personal details
- Party: Democratic
- Education: University of Missouri

Patricia (Pattie) Mansur is an American politician who was elected member of the Missouri House of Representatives for the 25th district in 2024.

Mansur has worked as a policy director for REACH Healthcare Foundation. She was a member of the Kansas City Public School's Board of Education.

She and her husband have three children and two grandchildren.
