= Darin Chappell =

American politician

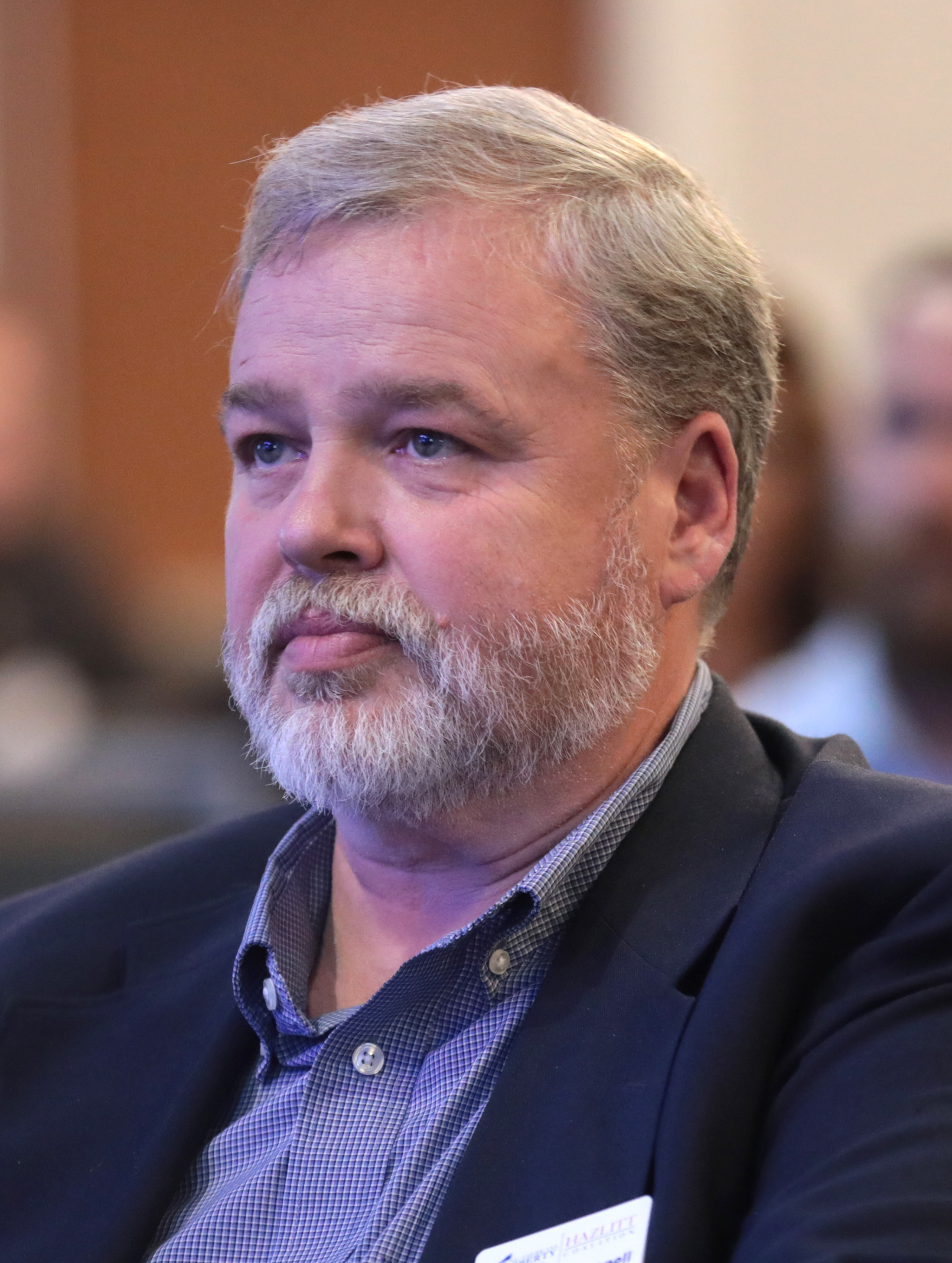
- Chappell in 2022

Member of the Missouri House of Representatives from the 137th district
- Incumbent
- Assumed office January 4, 2023
- Preceded by: John Black (redistricted)

Personal details
- Born: May 28, 1966 (age 60)
- Party: Republican
- Relatives: Chappell Roan (niece)
- Education: Missouri State University (BA)
- Website: Campaign website

Darin Chappell (born May 28, 1966) is an American politician serving as a Republican member of the Missouri House of Representatives, representing the state's 137th House district.

== Career ==
Chappell has worked as a city administrator for three southwest Missouri cities.

In the 2022 Missouri House of Representatives election, Chappell was elected in District 137. His district is located in Greene County, Missouri.

In 2025, Chappell sponsored legislation to prohibit sanctions on belief-based student groups at public universities and colleges. Opponents to the bill said they preferred the senate version, which includes an anti-discrimination provision.

In 2026, Chappell sponsored a bill that would further restrict abortion rights in Missouri and categorize fetuses as people. In November 2026, he was selected as majority leader of the Missouri House of Representatives.

== Electoral history ==
Missouri House of Representatives Primary Election, August 2, 2022, District 137
Party	Candidate	Votes	%	±%
Republican	Darin Chappell	3,519	50.8%	n/a
Republican	Thomas Barr	3,404	49.2%	n/a
Total votes		6,923	100.00%	

Missouri House of Representatives General Election, November 8, 2022, District 137
Party	Candidate	Votes	%	±%
Republican	Darin Chappell	13,708	100%	n/a
Total votes		13,708	100.00%	

Missouri House of Representatives General Election, November 8, 2024, District 137
Party	Candidate	Votes	%	±%
Republican	Darin Chappell	16,473	70.4%	−29.6
Democratic	Bryce Lockwood	6,911	29.6%	n/a
Total votes		23,572	100.00%	

Missouri House of Representatives General Election, November 3, 2026, District 137
Party	Candidate	Votes	%	±%
Republican	Darin Chappell	11,318	62.4%	−8.0%
Democratic	Bryce Lockwood	8,609	37.6%	+8.0%
Total votes		18,127	100.00%	

== Personal life ==
Chappell's niece is singer-songwriter Chappell Roan.
