= Holly Jones (politician) =

Missouri politician

Member of the Missouri House of Representatives from the 88th district
- Incumbent
- Assumed office January 4, 2023
- Preceded by: Tracy McCreery

Personal details
- Party: Republican
- Education: Southwest Missouri State University
- Website: hollyjones4mo.com

Holly Jones is an American politician. A Republican, she represents District 88 in the Missouri House of Representatives.

== Career ==
Prior to her political career, Jones worked in global logistics and was a project manager for a federal contractor. Jones is business manager for Renz Law and vice president of wellness development for the Nepute Wellness Group in addition to her legislative position.

=== House of Representatives ===
Jones' campaign website describes them as a "freedom fighter and conservative red-blooded American." Jones has pledged to "fight for our freedoms and God-given liberties" and promised to "support this district every step of the way in conserving our values and denying governmental overreach." Jones’ platform "works to remove the state income and personal property, battles for the unborn, fights to remove social emotional learning from our classrooms, and supports lawful gunowners who hunt and wish to protect their families."

In 2023, Jones sponsored a bill to require a "gene therapy" label on plant and animal products with vaccines or GMO treatments in production. It was opposed by the Missouri Cattlemen's Association, Missouri Biotech Association, and Missouri Chamber of Commerce.

In 2025, Jones restricted public testimony on a bill challenging an abortion amendment passed by voters the previous year, and ordered the room to be cleared by security when criticized. Jones's own district approved the amendment, however she has argued that they did not understand what they were voting for.
