= Jim Murphy (Missouri politician) =

American politician

Member of the Missouri House of Representatives from the 94th district
- Incumbent
- Assumed office 2019
- Preceded by: Cloria Brown
- Succeeded by: Cathy Summers (elect)

Personal details
- Born: 1950 or 1951 (age 75–76) New York, U.S.
- Party: Republican
- Spouse: Maryellen
- Children: 3
- Profession: businessman

Jim Murphy (born c. 1951) is an American politician. He is a member of the Missouri House of Representatives from the 94th District, in Saint Louis County, serving since 2019. He is a member of the Republican party.

== Electoral history ==
Missouri House of Representatives Primary Election, August 7, 2018, District 94
| Party | Candidate | Votes | % | ±% |
|---|---|---|---|---|
| Republican | Jim Murphy | 2,261 | 71.03% | |
| Republican | Ron Rammaha | 922 | 28.97% | |
| Total votes | | 3,183 | 100.00% | |

Missouri House of Representatives Election, November 6, 2018, District 94
| Party | Candidate | Votes | % | ±% |
|---|---|---|---|---|
| Republican | Jim Murphy | 7,739 | 51.15% | |
| Democratic | Jean Pretto | 7,392 | 48.85% | |
| Total votes | | 15,131 | 100.00% | |

Missouri House of Representatives Election, November 3, 2020, District 94
| Party | Candidate | Votes | % | ±% |
|---|---|---|---|---|
| Republican | Jim Murphy | 9,595 | 52.83% | +1.68 |
| Democratic | Jean Pretto | 8,566 | 47.17% | −1.68 |
| Total votes | | 18,161 | 100.00% | |

Missouri House of Representatives Election, November 8, 2022, District 94
| Party | Candidate | Votes | % | ±% |
|---|---|---|---|---|
| Republican | Jim Murphy | 7,892 | 57.11% | +4.28 |
| Democratic | Kyle Kerns | 5,926 | 42.89% | −4.28 |
| Total votes | | 13,818 | 100.00% | |
