= Stephanie Boykin =

American politician

Member of the Missouri House of Representatives from the 70th district
- Incumbent
- Assumed office January 8, 2025
- Succeeded by: Gretchen Bangert

Personal details
- Party: Democratic
- Education: Lincoln University; University of Missouri-Columbia

Stephanie Boykin is an American politician who was elected member of the Missouri House of Representatives for the 70th district in 2024.

Boykin is a 40 year veteran of the United States Air Force.
