= Bill Irwin (politician) =

American politician

Member of the Missouri House of Representatives from the 55th district
- Incumbent
- Assumed office January 8, 2025
- Preceded by: Mike Haffner

Personal details
- Born: St. Louis, Missouri, U.S.
- Party: Republican
- Website: https://www.irwinformissouri.com/

William Irwin is an American politician who was elected member of the Missouri House of Representatives for the 55th district in 2024.

Irwin is a retired Navy SEAL captain and former police officer in Lee's Summit.
