= Del Taylor =

American politician

Member of the Missouri House of Representatives from the 84th district
- Incumbent
- Assumed office January 4, 2023
- Preceded by: Wiley Price

Personal details
- Party: Democratic
- Education: Washington University in St. Louis

Delbret R. Taylor is an American politician serving as a Democratic member of the Missouri House of Representatives, representing the state's 84th House district.

== Early life ==
Taylor was born and raised in the West End neighborhood in St. Louis.

== Education ==
Taylor attended Washington University where he earned a degree in chemical engineering.
