= Jo Doll =

American politician

Member of the Missouri House of Representatives from the 91st district
- Incumbent
- Assumed office January 6, 2021
- Preceded by: Gina Mitten

Personal details
- Born: Kansas City, Missouri, U.S.
- Party: Democratic

Johanna Doll is a Democratic member of the Missouri House of Representatives, first election from the state's 83rd House district in 2020, and after redistricting in 2022, reelected from the 91st district.

== Career ==
Jo Doll received a BA in Psychology and from Washington University in St. Louis and a Master's in Physical Therapy from Washington University School of Medicine. She worked as a physical therapist before running for office. She became involved with politics in 2016, and was elected to the Webster Groves Board of Education the same year.She is currently the President of the Webster Groves Board of Education.

== Electoral history ==
- Rep. Doll was in a primary in her first election and won against Tyler Merkel, an attorney from Maplewood.

Missouri House of Representatives Election, November 3, 2020, District 83
Party	Candidate	Votes	%	±%
Democratic	Jo Doll	15,865	79.60%	
Libertarian	Andrew Bolin	4,066	20.40%	
Total votes		19,931	100.00%	

Missouri House of Representatives Election, November 8, 2022, District 91
Party	Candidate	Votes	%	±%
Democratic	Jo Doll	13,239	100.00%	+20.40
Total votes		13,239	100.00%	

== Personal life ==
Doll is married and has three sons. She lives in Webster Groves and attends Webster Groves Presbyterian Church.
