= Josh Hurlbert =

American politician

Member of the Missouri House of Representatives
- Incumbent
- Assumed office January 9, 2021
- Preceded by: Ken Wilson
- Constituency: 12th district (2021–2023); 8th district (2023–present)

Personal details
- Party: Republican
- Spouse: Ashley Hurlbert
- Children: 4

Josh Hurlbert is an American politician. He is a Republican member of the Missouri House of Representatives, elected in November 2020 to represent District 12. Following redistricting in 2022, his home was placed in District 8, where he successfully ran for re-election. Democrat Jamie Johnson won the redrawn 12th district.

== Missouri House of Representatives ==
In 2025, Hurlbert sponsored a bill to allow utility companies to charge customers additional charges for Construction Work in Progress.

=== Committee assignments ===
- General Laws
- Transportation
- Workforce Development
- Joint Committee on Transportation Oversight

== Electoral history ==
Missouri House of Representatives Primary Election, August 4, 2020, District 12
Party	Candidate	Votes	%	±%
Republican	Josh Hurlbert	3,710	82.33%	
Republican	Deanettee Lemons	796	17.67%	
Total votes		4,506	100.00%	

Missouri House of Representatives Election, November 3, 2020 District 12
Party	Candidate	Votes	%	±%
Republican	Josh Hurlbert	14,863	65.22%	
Democratic	Wade Kiefer	7,962	34.78%	
Total votes		22,789	100.00%	

Missouri House of Representatives Election, November 8, 2022, District 8
Party	Candidate	Votes	%	±%
Republican	Josh Hurlbert (incumbent)	10,204	67.97%	+2.75
Democratic	Alyssa Dial	4,808	32.03%	−2.75
Total votes		15,012	100.00%	

Missouri House of Representatives Election, November 5, 2024, District 8
Party	Candidate	Votes	%	±%
Republican	Josh Hurlbert (incumbent)	15,167	68.59%	+0.62
Democratic	Sandy Van Wagner	6,946	31.41%	−0.62
Total votes		22,113	100.00%	
