= Jeremy Dean (politician) =

American politician

Member of the Missouri House of Representatives from the 132nd district
- Incumbent
- Assumed office January 8, 2025
- Preceded by: Crystal Quade

Personal details
- Born: Springfield, Missouri
- Party: Democratic
- Education: University of Central Missouri
- Website: upballot.com

Jeremy Dean is an American politician who was elected member of the Missouri House of Representatives for the 132nd district in 2024. Dean defeated Republican candidate Stephanos Freeman by 337 votes. In 2023, he ran for city council.

== Early life and education ==
Dean was born in Springfield, Missouri and graduated from Willard High School in 2015. He later attended the University of Central Missouri. Dean served in nonprofit sector roles, including management at Ferrell Duncan OB/GYN and Director of Operations at the Drew Lewis Foundation, prior to his election.

== Missouri House of Representatives ==
Dean has served as a Democratic member of the Missouri House of Representatives, where they have focused on issues including legislative procedure, constituent services, and party organizing.

In 2025, Dean participated in a sit-in with other Democratic representatives during a special session to protest mid-decade redistricting that was done at the request of President Donald Trump in attempts to gain an additional Republican congressional seat in Missouri. Minority Leader Ashley Aune removed Dean from committee assignments and a House ethics investigation was opened following a private message sent by Dean to another representative. It was publicly circulated and drew criticism from Republican lawmakers. After the message was shared on social media, Dean reported receiving harassment and threats.
