= Jaclyn Zimmermann =

American politician

Member of the Missouri House of Representatives from the 98th district
- Incumbent
- Assumed office January 8, 2025
- Succeeded by: Deb Lavender

Personal details
- Born: Rolla, Missouri, U.S.
- Party: Democratic
- Education: Missouri State University
- Website: https://jaclynzimmermann.com/

Jaclyn Zimmermann is an American politician who was elected member of the Missouri House of Representatives for the 98th district in 2024.

Zimmermann is a practicing attorney and a small business owner. She and her husband have three children.
