= Nick Kimble =

American politician

Member of the Missouri House of Representatives from the 82nd district
- Incumbent
- Assumed office January 8, 2025
- Preceded by: Donna Baringer

Personal details
- Party: Democratic
- Website: upballot.com

Nick Kimble is an American politician who was elected to the Missouri House of Representatives from the 82nd district in 2024. He entered office in January 2025.

Kimble is a graduate of Loyola University Chicago. He is a Roman Catholic.

== Missouri House of Representatives ==
In March 2025, Kimble was one of seven House Democrats to vote for state takeover of St. Louis Metropolitan Police Department.
