= Dean Van Schoiack =

American politician

Member of the Missouri House of Representatives from the 9th district
- Incumbent
- Assumed office January 9, 2021
- Preceded by: Sheila Solon

Personal details
- Born: St. Joseph, Missouri, U.S.
- Party: Republican
- Spouse: Mary Ann
- Children: 2

Dean Van Schoiack is an American politician. A Republican, he has represented District 9 in the Missouri House of Representatives since first being elected in November 2020.

== Missouri House of Representatives ==
In 2024, Van Schoiack spoke out against a bill that would outlaw marriage for anyone under 18, saying, "Why is the government getting involved in people's lives like this? What purpose do we have in deciding that a couple who are 16 or 17 years old, their parents say, you know, 'You guys love each other, go ahead and get married, you have my permission.' Why would we stop that?"

In April 2025, Van Schoiack sponsored a bill to restrict animal control from getting warrants to investigate animal cruelty reports, and restrict veterinary care available to confiscated animals. Agriculture and breeder industry lobbyists supported the legislation, however animal care advocates, legal experts, and law enforcement opposed the measure.

=== Committee assignments ===
- Agriculture Policy
- Downsizing State Government
- Special Committee on Criminal Justice

== Electoral history ==
Missouri House of Representatives Republican Primary, August 4, 2020, District 9
Party	Candidate	Votes	%	±%
Republican	Dean Van Schoiack	4,046	56.82%	+0%
Republican	Tina Goodrick	3,075	43.18%	+0%
Total votes		7,121	100.00%	

Missouri House of Representatives Election, November 3, 2020, District 9
Party	Candidate	Votes	%	±%
Republican	Dean Van Schoiack	14,047	71.26%	+13%
Democratic	Karen Planalp	5,666	28.74%	−13%
Total votes		19,713	100.00%	

Missouri House of Representatives Election, November 8, 2022, District 9
Party	Candidate	Votes	%	±%
Republican	Dean Van Schoiack	10,803	100.00%	+28.74
Total votes		10,803	100.00%	
