= Melissa Schmidt =

American politician

Member of the Missouri House of Representatives from the 141st district
- Incumbent
- Assumed office January 8, 2025
- Succeeded by: Hannah Kelly

Personal details
- Party: Republican
- Website: melissaschmidtformissouri.com

Melissa Schmidt is an American politician who was elected member of the Missouri House of Representatives for the 141st district in 2024.

Schmidt served as Vice Chair for the Laclede County Republican Central Committee. She and her husband have two children.
