= Jeff Myers (politician) =

American politician

Member of the Missouri House of Representatives from the 42nd district
- Incumbent
- Assumed office January 4, 2023
- Preceded by: Jeff Porter

Personal details
- Born: Missouri, U.S.
- Party: Republican
- Website: https://myers4mo.com/

Jeff Myers is an American politician serving as a Republican member of the Missouri House of Representatives, representing the state's 42nd House district.

== Early life and education ==
Myers graduated from Warren County R-III High School and Central Methodist College.

== Career ==
Myers is a former state trooper and businessman. In the 2022 Missouri House of Representatives election, Myers was elected in District 42.
