= Cathy Jo Loy =

American politician

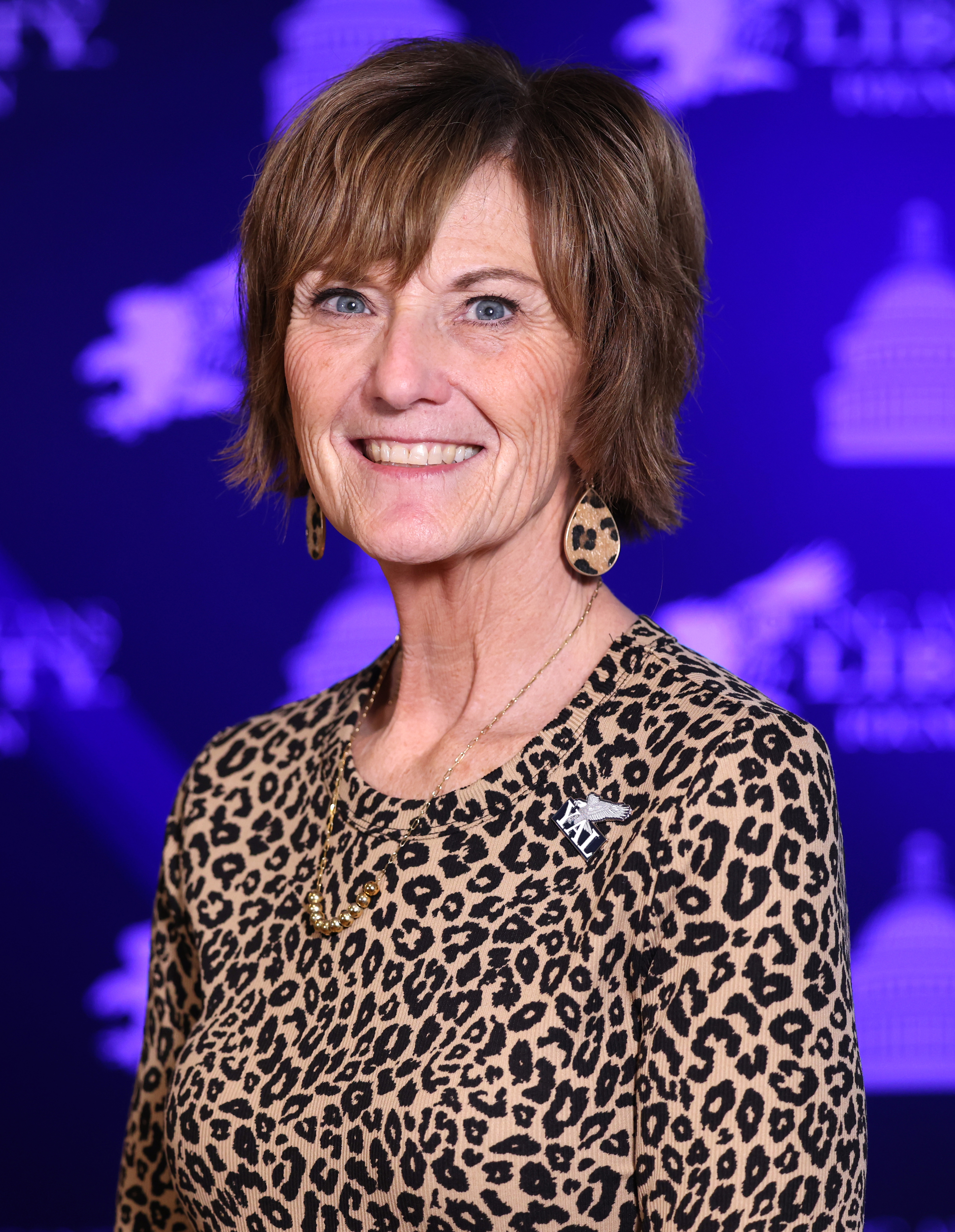

Member of the Missouri House of Representatives from the 163rd district
- Incumbent
- Assumed office January 8, 2025
- Succeeded by: Cody Smith

Personal details
- Born: Ottawa, Kansas
- Party: Republican
- Website: cathyjo4mo163.co

Cathy Jo Loy is an American politician who was elected member of the Missouri House of Representatives for the 163rd district in 2024.

Loy lives in Carthage, Missouri. She is a veteran conservative grassroots organizer.

She and her husband Clint have five children and ten grandchildren.
