= Mike Steinmeyer =

American politician

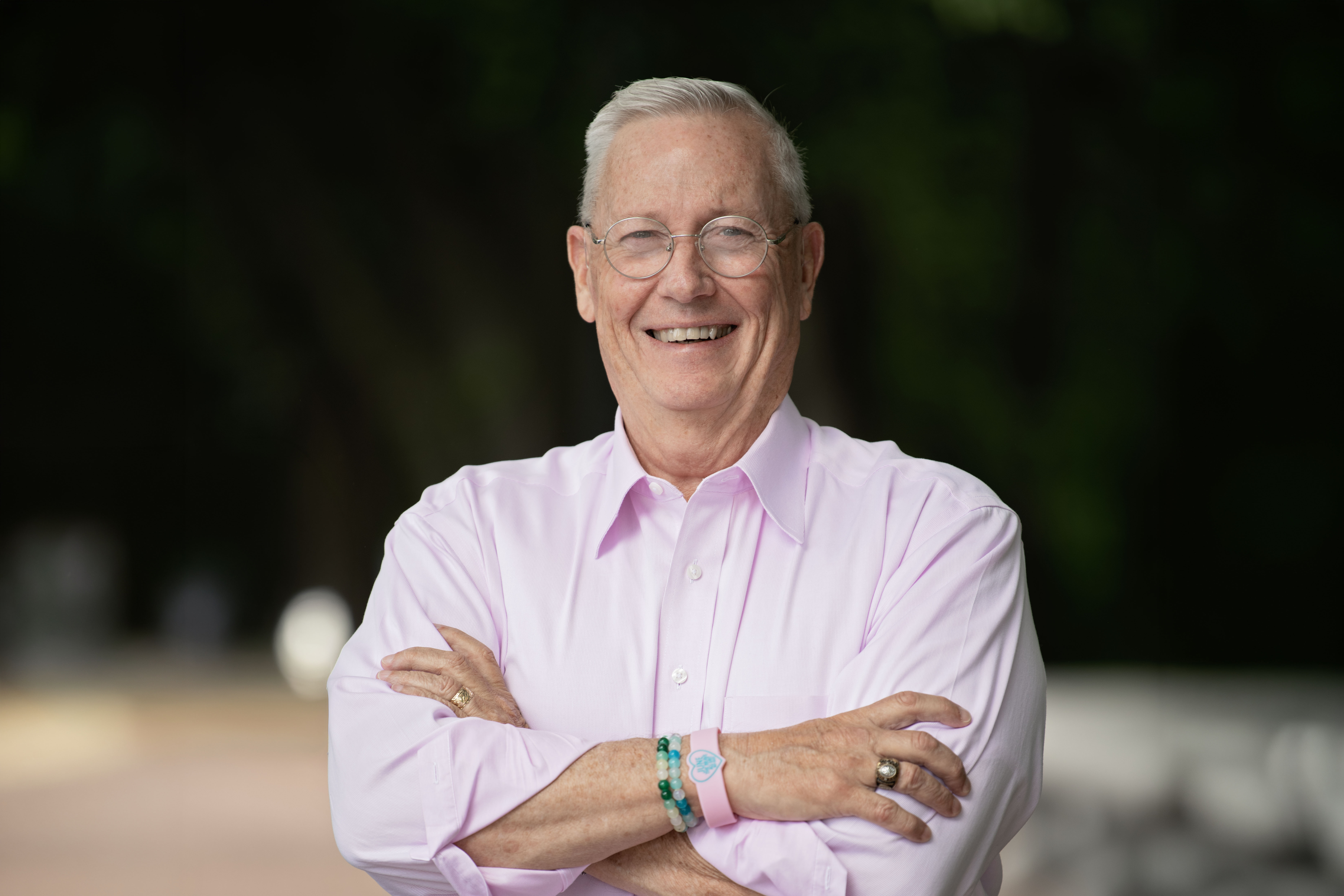

Member of the Missouri House of Representatives from the 20th district
- Incumbent
- Assumed office January 8, 2025
- Preceded by: Aaron McMullen
- Succeeded by: Jeff Spicer (elect)

Personal details
- Party: Republican
- Website: steinmeyerformo.com

Mike Steinmeyer is an American politician serving as a Republican member of the Missouri House of Representatives from the 20th district since 2025. The district covers part of Jackson County, including the city of Sugar Creek and the northern and eastern portions of Independence. Steinmeyer previously served on the Independence City Council from 2020 to 2023.

== Early life and career ==
Steinmeyer is a native of Sugar Creek, Missouri. He graduated from William Chrisman High School and earned a Bachelor of Arts in evangelism from Oral Roberts University. He is a veteran of the United States Navy. After leaving military service he worked as a realtor and spent seventeen years as a sales manager and trainer in Los Angeles and Kansas City.

== Independence City Council ==
Steinmeyer was elected to the Independence City Council in 2020, representing the city's Third District. He resigned from the council in October 2023 to run for the Missouri House.

== Committees Assignments ==
- Chairman - Subcommittee on Appropriations - Public Safety, Corrections, Transportation, and Revenue
- Budget
- Subcommittee on Appropriations - Health, Mental Health, and Social Services
- Local Government
- Rules - Legislative
- Utilities
- Conference Committee on Budget

== Election details ==
Missouri House of Representatives Election, November 5, 2024, District 20
Party	Candidate	Votes	%	±%
Republican	Mike Steinmeyer	9,664	59.39	
Democratic	Clarence Franklin Jr.	6,608	40.61	
Total votes		16,272	100.00	
