= Bill Lucas (Missouri politician) =

American politician

Member of the Missouri House of Representatives from the 115th district
- Incumbent
- Assumed office January 8, 2025
- Preceded by: Cyndi Buchheit-Courtway

Personal details
- Party: Republican

Bill Lucas is an American politician who was elected member of the Missouri House of Representatives for the 115th district in 2024.

Lucas is a retired machinist from De Soto, Missouri. His ancestor Hugh C.P. Lucas also served as a Missouri legislator in the 1830s.
