= Becky Laubinger =

American politician

Member of the Missouri House of Representatives from the 117th district
- Incumbent
- Assumed office January 8, 2025
- Preceded by: Mike Henderson

Personal details
- Party: Republican
- Education: Missouri Baptist University
- Website: laubingerformissouri.com

Becky Laubinger is an American politician who was elected member of the Missouri House of Representatives for the 117th district in 2024.

Laubinger graduated from Missouri Baptist University with a BA in Religious studies. She is a pro-life activist and director of a crisis pregnancy center.

In 2025, Laubinger supported measures to repeal a voter passed amendment to allow abortion in Missouri.
