= Marlene Terry =

American politician

Member of the Missouri House of Representatives from the 66th district
- Incumbent
- Assumed office January 5, 2021
- Preceded by: Tommie Pierson Jr.

Personal details
- Born: Marlene Yvonne Terry St. Louis, Missouri, U.S.
- Party: Democratic
- Children: 2

Marlene Yvonne Terry is an American politician serving as a member of the Missouri House of Representatives from the 66th district. Elected in November 2020, she assumed office on January 5, 2021.

== Early life and education ==
Terry was born and raised in St. Louis. After graduating from University City High School, she attended the University of Missouri–St. Louis.

== Career ==
Terry has worked as an accounting clerk for BJC HealthCare. She also served as a member of the Riverview Gardens School Board for nine years. Terry was elected to the Missouri House of Representatives in 2020, placing first in the Democratic primary and running unopposed in the general election. She assumed office on January 5, 2021.

== Electoral history ==
Missouri House of Representatives Primary Election, August 4, 2020, District 66
| Party | Candidate | Votes | % | ±% |
|---|---|---|---|---|
| Democratic | Marlene Terry | 3,551 | 63.58% | |
| Democratic | Troy Jefferson | 1,286 | 23.03% | |
| Democratic | Thomas (Tommie) Gary Bradley | 748 | 13.39% | |
| Total votes | | 5,585 | 100.00% | |

Missouri House of Representatives Election, November 3, 2020, District 66
| Party | Candidate | Votes | % | ±% |
|---|---|---|---|---|
| Democratic | Marlene Terry | 11,655 | 100.00% | |
| Total votes | | 11,655 | 100.00% | |

Missouri House of Representatives Election, November 8, 2022, District 66
| Party | Candidate | Votes | % | ±% |
|---|---|---|---|---|
| Democratic | Marlene Terry | 6,033 | 100.00% | 0.00 |
| Total votes | | 6,033 | 100.00% | |
