= Adrian Plank =

American politician

Member of the Missouri House of Representatives from the 47th district
- Incumbent
- Assumed office January 4, 2023

Personal details
- Born: Huntsville, Missouri, U.S.
- Party: Democratic
- Education: Central Missouri State University

Adrian Plank is an American politician. He serves as a Democratic member for the 47th district of the Missouri House of Representatives.

== Life and career ==
Plank was born in Huntsville. He attended Westran High School and Central Missouri State University.

In August 2022, Plank defeated Chimene Schwach in the Democratic primary election for the 47th district of the Missouri House of Representatives. In November 2022, he defeated John Martin in the general election, winning 52 percent of the votes. He assumed office in 2023.
