= Connie Steinmetz =

American politician

Member of the Missouri House of Representatives from the 87th district
- Incumbent
- Assumed office January 8, 2025
- Preceded by: Paula Brown

Personal details
- Born: Kansas City, Kansas, U.S.
- Party: Democratic
- Education: University of Missouri, Columbia; Maryville University
- Website: https://www.conniesteinmetz.org/

Connie Steinmetz (née Callahan) is an American politician who was elected member of the Missouri House of Representatives for the 87th district in 2024.

Steinmetz is a retired public school teacher and trade union leader.

Her mother-in-law Kaye Steinmetz also served in the Missouri House of Representatives for 18 years. She and her husband have three daughters.
