= Jeff Vernetti =

American politician and businessman

Member of the Missouri House of Representatives from the 123rd district
- Incumbent
- Assumed office January 8, 2025
- Preceded by: Lisa Thomas

Personal details
- Born: St. Louis, Missouri, U.S.
- Party: Republican
- Education: Southeast Missouri State University (B.S.)

Jeff Vernetti is an American politician, businessman, and developer, serving as a member of the Missouri House of Representatives from the 123rd District, which covers the majority of Camden County and the Lake of the Ozarks. He was elected in November 2024. Vernetti is the co-founder and co-owner of Ballparks National at the Lake of the Ozarks.

== Early life and education ==
Vernetti was born in St. Louis, Missouri and graduated from Lafayette High School in Wildwood, Missouri. He earned a Bachelor of Science degree in Mass Communications from Southeast Missouri State University in 1999.

== Professional career ==
Vernetti spent over ten years as a sports talk show host in St. Louis until 2015. He co-founded and is co-owner in Ballparks National with Bob Ramsey. Vernetti also is co-founder and owner of LOZ Sports Training. He works as a real estate developer in Mid-Missouri.

== Political career ==
In August 2024, Vernetti defeated incumbent Lisa Thomas in the 123rd District Republican primary. He then went on to defeat challenger Nancy Bates in November 2024 for the seat in the Missouri House of Representatives, assuming office on January 8, 2025. In 2026 he announced he was running for reelection and ran unopposed in the August Republican primary.

Vernetti defeated Democratic challenger Cody Hutcheson in November 2026 to win reelection for a second term.

=== Legislation and committees ===
In his first term, Vernetti served on Budget, Economic Development, Professional Registration and Licensing, Subcommittee on Appropriations, Special Committee on Tourism and the Special Committee on Redistricting.

In 2025, Vernetti passed bills to transfer state land to the city of Osage Beach for the Lee C. Fine Memorial Airport and to designate the Grand Glaize Bridge in memory of Osage Beach police officer Phylicia Carson.

Also in 2025, Vernetti contributed to legislation to repeal provisions mandating paid sick leave requirements as part of HB 567.

In 2026, Vernetti sponsored and passed bills to establish an entertainment zone in the city of Osage Beachand to make employers liable for employing undocumented workers in construction jobs. He also passed legislation protecting businesses from predatory lawsuits related to American Disabilities Act requirements for websites.

=== Honors ===
Vernetti was named a Henry Toll Fellow by the Council of State Governments. In addition, the Commonwealth of Kentucky commissioned him as a Kentucky Colonel, the highest title of recognition awarded by the Commonwealth in recognition of leadership and character.

== Electoral history ==
State Representative

Missouri House of Representatives Primary Election, August 6, 2024, District 123

Party	Candidate	Votes	%
Republican	Jeff Vernetti	4,582	59.40%
Republican	Lisa Thomas	3,132	40.60%
	Total Votes	7,714	100.00%

Missouri House of Representatives Election, November 5, 2024, District 123.

Party	Candidate	Votes	%
Republican	Jeff Vernetti	17,185	76.58%
Democratic	Nancy Bates	5,256	23.42%
	Total Votes	22,441	100.00%

Missouri House of Representatives Primary Election, August 4, 2026, District 123

Party	Candidate	Votes	%
Republican	Jeff Vernetti	6,898	100.0%
	Total Votes	6,898	100.00%

Missouri House of Representatives Election, November 3, 2026, District 123.

Party	Candidate	Votes	%
Republican	Jeff Vernetti	10,921	70.20%
Democratic	Cody Hutcheson	4,635	29.80%
	Total Votes	15,556	100.00%
