= Bill Falkner =

American politician

Bill Falkner III
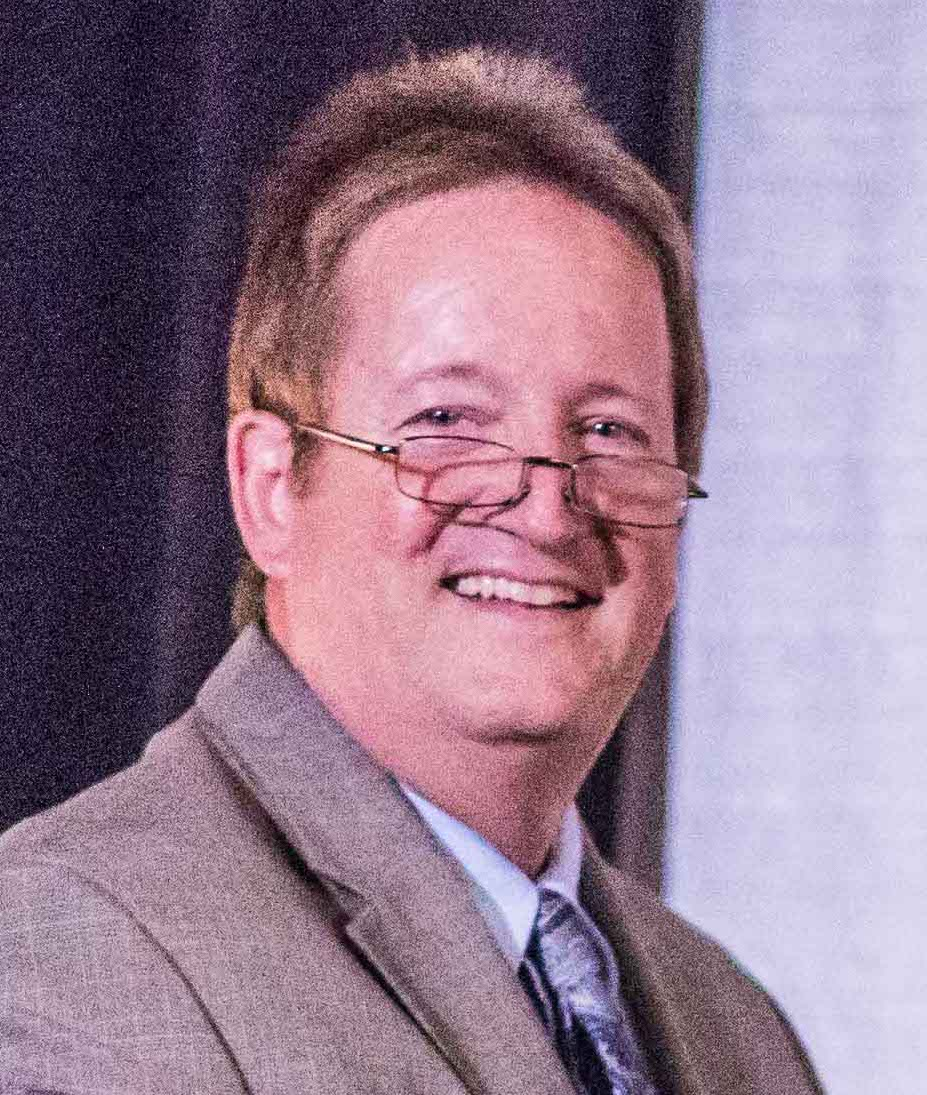
- Falkner in 2017

Member of the Missouri House of Representatives from the 10th district
- Incumbent
- Assumed office 2019
- Preceded by: Pat Conway
- Succeeded by: Paul Gatewood (elect)

Personal details
- Born: St. Joseph, Missouri, U.S.
- Party: Republican
- Spouse: Renee
- Children: 3
- Profession: plumbing consultant

William H. Falkner III is an American politician. He is a member of the Missouri House of Representatives from the 10th District, serving since 2019. He is a member of the Republican party and former mayor of St. Joseph, Missouri.

== Electoral history ==
=== State representative ===
Missouri House of Representatives Primary Election, August 7, 2018, District 10
Party	Candidate	Votes	%	±%
Republican	Bill Falkner	2,229	72.09%	
Republican	Billy Babcock	863	27.91%	
Total votes		3,092	100.00%	

Missouri House of Representatives Election, November 6, 2018, District 10
Party	Candidate	Votes	%	±%
Republican	Bill Falkner	5,753	58.13%	+58.13
Democratic	Shane Thompson	4,144	41.87%	−41.87
Total votes		9,897	100.00%	

Missouri House of Representatives Election, November 3, 2020, District 10
Party	Candidate	Votes	%	±%
Republican	Bill Falkner	7,110	61.02%	+2.89
Democratic	Colby Murphy	4,541	38.98%	−2.89
Total votes		11,651	100.00%	

Missouri House of Representatives Election, November 8, 2022, District 10
Party	Candidate	Votes	%	±%
Republican	Bill Falkner	7,271	100.00%	+38.98
Total votes		7,121	100.00%	
