= Christopher Warwick =

American politician

Member of the Missouri House of Representatives from the 128th district
- Incumbent
- Assumed office January 8, 2025
- Preceded by: Mike Stephens

Personal details
- Born: Alton, Illinois, U.S.
- Party: Republican
- Website: https://warwickformo128th.com/

Christopher D. Warwick is an American politician who was elected member of the Missouri House of Representatives for the 128th district in 2024.

Warwick was alderman and mayor of Bolivar, Missouri. He and his wife Jody have four children.
