= Hardy Billington =

American politician

Member of the Missouri House of Representatives from the 152nd district
- Incumbent
- Assumed office 2019

Personal details
- Born: 1952 or 1953 (age 72–73) Los Angeles, California, U.S.
- Party: Republican
- Spouse: Dianne
- Children: three
- Profession: State Representative

Hardy Billington (born 1952 or 1953) is an American politician. He is a member of the Missouri House of Representatives from the 152nd District, serving since 2019. He is a member of the Republican party.

== Positions ==
=== Child marriage ===
In May 2024, Billington expressed opposition to legislation introduced by Missouri state senator Holly Thompson Rehder that would prohibit anyone under the age of 18 from obtaining a marriage license in Missouri, with Billington claiming in an interview with The Kansas City Star that the bill would lead pregnant teenagers to seek abortions if they could not get married.
