= Alex Riley (politician) =

American attorney and politician

Majority Leader of the Missouri House of Representatives
- Incumbent
- Assumed office January 8, 2025
- Preceded by: Jonathan Patterson

Member of the Missouri House of Representatives from the 134th district
- Incumbent
- Assumed office January 6, 2021
- Preceded by: Elijah Haahr

Personal details
- Born: Springfield, Missouri, U.S.
- Party: Republican
- Spouse: Ellen
- Children: 2
- Education: Thomas Edison State University (BA); Southern Illinois University, Carbondale (JD)

Alex Riley is an American attorney and politician serving as a member of the Missouri House of Representatives from the 134th district. Elected in November 2020, he assumed office on January 6, 2021.

== Early life and education ==
Riley was born and raised in Springfield, Missouri. He earned a Bachelor of Arts degree in political science from Thomas Edison State University, a paralegal certificate from Purdue University, and a Juris Doctor from the Southern Illinois University School of Law.

== Career ==
Riley began his career as a paralegal for Turner, Reid, Duncan, Loomer & Patton, P.C. He later worked as an associate attorney at the Malkmus Law Firm. Since January 2019, he has worked as an associate at McAfee & Taft. Riley was elected to the Missouri House of Representatives in November 2020 and assumed office on January 6, 2021. Riley also serves as vice chair of the Joint Committee on Administrative Rules and vice chair of the House General Laws Committee.

Missouri House of Representatives
Preceded by Jonathan Patterson	Majority Leader of the Missouri House of Representatives; 2025–present	Incumbent
