= Matthew Overcast =

American politician

Member of the Missouri House of Representatives from the 155th district
- Incumbent
- Assumed office January 8, 2025
- Preceded by: Travis Smith

Personal details
- Born: Houston, Missouri, U.S.
- Party: Republican
- Education: Drury University
- Website: overcastformissouri.com

Matthew Overcast is an American politician who was elected member of the Missouri House of Representatives for the 155th district in 2024.

Overcast served in the United States Air Force from 2010 to 2014. Overcast is a licensed attorney.

In the legislature, he sits on the Elementary and Secondary Education Committee; the Emerging Issues Committee and the Judiciary Committee
