= Steve Jordan (politician) =

American politician

Member of the Missouri House of Representatives from the 151st district
- Incumbent
- Assumed office January 8, 2025
- Preceded by: Herman Morse

Personal details
- Party: Republican
- Website: https://friendsofstevewjordan.com/

Steven W. Jordan is an American politician who was elected member of the Missouri House of Representatives for the 151st district in 2024.

Jordan worked for 34 years as the vice president and general manager of Heavy Duty Trux Ltd. He was the County Commissioner of Stoddard County until 2022.
