= Barry Hovis =

American politician

Member of the Missouri House of Representatives from the 146th district
- Incumbent
- Assumed office 2019
- Preceded by: Donna Lichtenegger
- Succeeded by: Lucas Green (elect)

Personal details
- Born: 1964 or 1965 (age 61–62) Lutesville, Missouri, U.S.
- Party: Republican
- Spouse: Laura
- Children: 3
- Profession: businessman, farmer

Barry Hovis (born 1964 or 1965) is an American politician. He is a member of the Missouri House of Representatives from the 146th District, serving since 2019. He is a member of the Republican party.

On May 17, 2019 while speaking in the House of Representatives of Missouri he used the term "consensual rape." He later apologized and provided different explanations. He reported to the associated press that he meant to say, "consensual or rape" "When pressed on whether that explanation made sense in the context of the rest of his sentence, he said that he believes there is no such thing as “consensual rape.” Later when speaking to KCTV5 via phone he stated he was using "street language" in situations where somebody got drunk at a party and then reported a rape in a "he said - she said" situation. Speaking to the Southeast Missourian he stated "he did not realize he had used the term “consensual rapes” until it was pointed out by a House colleague." He went on to state these were situations where there was a "difference of opinion between the two parties". There is no record resolving the explanations.
