= Elizabeth Fuchs =

American politician

Member of the Missouri House of Representatives from the 80th district
- Incumbent
- Assumed office January 8, 2025
- Preceded by: Peter Merideth

Personal details
- Party: Democratic

Elizabeth Fuchs is an American politician who was elected member of the Missouri House of Representatives for the 80th district in 2024, which includes portions of South St. Louis City.

Fuchs is a graduate of the University of Missouri–St. Louis. She was a manager of public policy and lobbyist for PROMO, an LGBTQ advocacy organization based in Missouri. She has also worked as a social worker and as a faculty member in the Washington University in St. Louis Brown School of Social Work.

She identifies as part of the LGBTQ community.
