= Dave Griffith =

American politician

Member of the Missouri House of Representatives from the 60th district
- Incumbent
- Assumed office 2019
- Preceded by: Jason Barnes
- Succeeded by: Suzanne Luther (elect)

Personal details
- Party: Republican

David Griffith is an American politician currently serving in the Missouri House of Representatives from Missouri's 60th district. He won the seat after defeating Democrat Sara Michael 57.7% to 42.3%.

== Electoral history ==
Missouri House of Representatives Primary Election, August 7, 2018, District 60
Party	Candidate	Votes	%	±%
Republican	Dave Griffith	3,251	50.92%	
Republican	Jane Beetem	1,649	25.83%	
Republican	Pat Rowe Kerr	1,484	23.25%	
Total votes		6,384	100.00%	

Missouri House of Representatives Election, November 6, 2018, District 60
Party	Candidate	Votes	%	±%
Republican	Dave Griffith	8,944	57.64%	
Democratic	Sara Michael	6,572	42.36%	
Total votes		15,516	100.00%	

Missouri House of Representatives Election, November 3, 2020, District 60
Party	Candidate	Votes	%	±%
Republican	Dave Griffith	11,404	63.76%	+6.12
Democratic	Joshua Dunne	6,483	36.24%	−6.12
Total votes		17,887	100.00%	

Missouri House of Representatives Election, November 8, 2022, District 60
Party	Candidate	Votes	%	±%
Republican	Dave Griffith	7,577	62.20%	−1.56
Democratic	J. Don Salcedo	4,605	37.80%	+1.56
Total votes		12,182	100.00%	
