= Missouri House of Representatives =

Lower house of the Missouri General Assembly

Coordinates: 38°34′46″N 92°10′24″W

- Missouri General Assembly

Type
- Type: Lower house
- Term limits: 4 terms (8 years)

History
- New session started: January 8, 2025

Leadership
- Speaker: Jon Patterson (R) since January 8, 2025
- Speaker pro tempore: Chad Perkins (R) since January 8, 2025
- Majority Leader: Alex Riley (R) since January 8, 2025
- Minority Leader: Ashley Aune (D) since January 8, 2025

Structure
- Seats: 163
- Political groups: Majority: Republican (105); Minority: Democratic (50); Vacant: Vacant (8)
- Length of term: 2 years
- Authority: Article III, Missouri Constitution
- Salary: $35,915/year + per diem

Elections
- Last election: November 5, 2024 (163 seats)
- Next election: November 3, 2026 (163 seats)
- Redistricting: Legislative Control

Meeting place
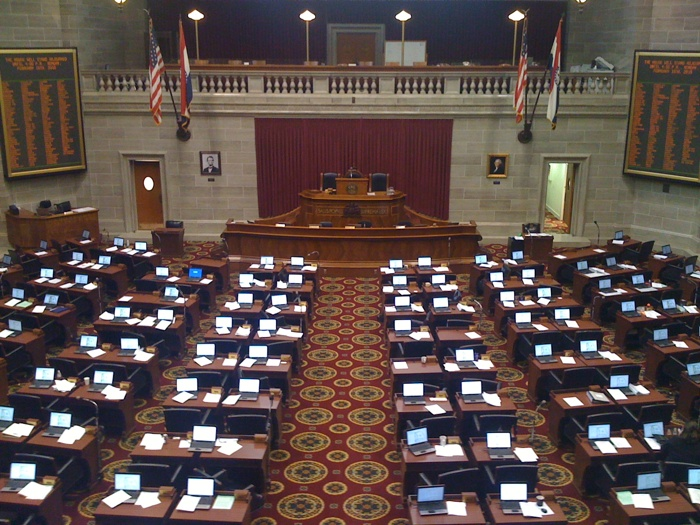
- House of Representatives Chamber; Missouri State Capitol; Jefferson City, Missouri

Website
- Missouri House of Representatives

Rules
- Rules of the House of Representatives of the 102nd General Assembly

The Missouri House of Representatives is the lower chamber of the Missouri General Assembly, the upper chamber being the Missouri Senate. It has 163 members, representing districts with an average size of 37,000 residents. House members are elected for two-year terms during general elections held in even-numbered years.

Missouri's house is the fourth largest in the United States even as the state ranks 18th in population. The only states with a larger lower house in the United States are New Hampshire (400), Pennsylvania (203), and Georgia (180). Republicans have controlled the State House since 2003.

The next election will be held in 2026.

== Operations ==
The Missouri House of Representatives meets annually beginning on the Wednesday after the first Monday in January. A part-time legislature, it concludes session business by May 30. To serve in the chamber, an individual must have attained the age of 24 and have resided in their district for a period of one year preceding the election. State representatives are paid $36,813 per year, with a per diem of $121 per day. The Speaker of the House is the most powerful individual in the chamber, elected by all members of the House. The Speaker makes an additional $2,500 per year in accordance with state law. Representatives are term-limited to a maximum of four terms, or eight years, in the chamber.

Members confirm officers of the House every two years when organizing as a new General Assembly, which include the Chief Clerk, the Sergeant-At-Arms, the Chaplain, and the Doorkeeper. The Chief Clerk has the added responsibility of serving as House Administrator and is responsible for supervising the work of eight non-partisan staff. The current Chief Clerk and House Administrator is Joseph Engler.

Affiliation	Party (Shading indicates majority caucus)			Total	Vacant
Affiliation	Republican	Democratic	Independent	Total	Vacant
Start of 2021 session	114	48	0	162	1
Start of 2022 session	108	49	0	157	6
Start of 2023 session	111	52	0	163	0
Start of 2025 session	110	52	0	162	1
Current status	105	50	0	155	8
Latest voting share	67.7%	32.3%			

↓
105	50
Republican	Democratic

=== Leadership ===
Position	Name	Party	District
Speaker of the House	Jonathan Patterson	Republican	30th – Lee's Summit
Speaker Pro Tem	Chad Perkins	Republican	40th – Bowling Green
Majority Floor Leader	Alex Riley	Republican	134th – Springfield
Assistant Majority Floor Leader	Lane Roberts	Republican	161st – Joplin
Majority Whip	Hardy Billington	Republican	152nd – Poplar Bluff
Minority Floor Leader	Ashley Aune	Democratic	14th – Kansas City
Assistant Minority Floor Leader	Marlon Anderson	Democratic	76th – St. Louis
Minority Whip	Aaron Crossley	Democratic	29th – Independence

=== List of current representatives ===
District	Name	Party	Residence	Start	Term Limited
1	Jeff Farnan	Republican	Stanberry	2023	2031
2	Mazzie Christensen	Republican	Hamilton	2023	2031
3	Danny Busick	Republican	Newtown	2019	2027
4	Greg Sharpe	Republican	Ewing	2019	2027
5	Louis Riggs	Republican	Hannibal	2019	2027
6	Ed Lewis	Republican	Moberly	2021	2029
7	Peggy McGaugh	Republican	Carrollton	2018 (Note: Originally elected in a special election.)	2027
8	Josh Hurlbert	Republican	Smithville	2021	2029
9	Dean Van Schoiack	Republican	Savannah	2021	2029
10	Bill Falkner	Republican	St. Joseph	2019	2027
11	Brenda Shields	Republican	St. Joseph	2019	2027
12	Mike Jones	Republican	Kansas City	2025	2033
13	Sean Pouche	Republican	Kansas City	2021	2029
14	Ashley Aune	Democratic	Kansas City	2021	2029
15	Ken Jamison	Democratic	Gladstone	2025	2033
16	Chris Brown	Republican	Kansas City	2021	2029
17	Bill Allen	Republican	Kansas City	2023	2031
18	Eric Woods	Democratic	Kansas City	2023	2031
19	Wick Thomas	Democratic	Kansas City	2025	2033
20	Mike Steinmeyer	Republican	Sugar Creek	2025	2033
21	Will Jobe	Democratic	Independence	2025	2033
22	Yolanda Young	Democratic	Kansas City	2020	2027
23	Michael Johnson	Democratic	Kansas City	2021	2029
24	Emily Weber	Democratic	Kansas City	2021	2029
25	Pattie Mansur	Democratic	Kansas City	2025	2033
26	Tiffany Price	Democratic	Kansas City	2025	2033
27	Melissa Douglas	Democratic	Kansas City	2025	2033
28	Donna Barnes	Democratic	Raytown	2025	2033
29	Vacant			2026	
30	Jonathan Patterson	Republican	Lee's Summit	2019	2027
31	Ron Fowler	Republican	Blue Springs	2025	2033
32	Jeff Coleman	Republican	Grain Valley	2019	2027
33	Carolyn Caton	Republican	Blue Springs	2025	2033
34	Kemp Strickler	Democratic	Lee's Summit	2023	2031
35	Keri Ingle	Democratic	Lee's Summit	2019	2027
36	Anthony Ealy	Democratic	Grandview	2023	2031
37	Mark Sharp	Democratic	Kansas City	2020	2027
38	Martin Jacobs	Democratic	Liberty	2025	2033
39	Mark Meirath	Republican	Excelsior Springs	2025	2033
40	Chad Perkins	Republican	Bowling Green	2021	2029
41	Doyle Justus	Republican	Troy	2023	2031
42	Jeff Myers	Republican	Warrenton	2023	2031
43	Kent Haden	Republican	Mexico	2019	2027
44	John Martin	Republican	Columbia	2025	2033
45	Kathy Steinhoff	Democratic	Columbia	2023	2031
46	David Smith	Democratic	Columbia	2021	2029
47	Adrian Plank	Democratic	Columbia	2023	2031
48	Tim Taylor	Republican	Bunceton	2021	2029
49	Jim Schulte	Republican	New Bloomfield	2023	2031
50	Gregg Bush	Democratic	Columbia	2025	2033
51	Mark Nolte	Republican	Higginsville	2025	2033
52	Brad Pollitt	Republican	Sedalia	2019	2027
53	Terry Thompson	Republican	Lexington	2021	2029
54	Brandon Phelps	Republican	Warrensburg	2025	2033
55	Bill Irwin	Republican	Lee's Summit	2025	2033
56	Michael Davis	Republican	Kansas City	2021	2029
57	Rodger Reedy	Republican	Windsor	2019	2027
58	Willard Haley	Republican	Eldon	2021	2029
59	Rudy Veit	Republican	Wardsville	2019	2027
60	Dave Griffith	Republican	Jefferson City	2019	2027
61	Bruce Sassmann	Republican	Bland	2021	2029
62	Sherri Gallick	Republican	Belton	2023	2031
63	Tricia Byrnes	Republican	Wentzville	2023	2031
64	Deanna Self	Republican	St. Paul	2025	2033
65	Wendy Hausman	Republican	St. Peters	2023	2031
66	Marlene Terry	Democratic	St. Louis	2021	2029
67	Tonya Rush	Democratic	St. Louis	2025	2033
68	Kem Smith	Democratic	Florissant	2025	2033
69	Scott Miller	Republican	St. Charles	2025	2033
70	Stephanie Boykin	Democratic	Florissant	2025	2033
71	LaDonna Appelbaum	Democratic	St. Louis	2019	2027
72	Doug Clemens	Democratic	St. Ann	2019	2027
73	Raychel Proudie	Democratic	Ferguson	2019	2027
74	Marla Smith	Democratic	St. Louis	2025	2033
75	Chanel Mosley	Democratic	Black Jack	2025	2033
76	Marlon Anderson	Democratic	St. Louis	2021	2029
77	Kimberly-Ann Collins	Democratic	St. Louis	2021	2029
78	Marty Joe Murray	Democratic	St. Louis	2025	2033
79	LaKeySha Frazier-Bosley	Democratic	St. Louis	2019	2027
80	Elizabeth Fuchs	Democratic	St. Louis	2025	2033
81	Steve Butz	Democratic	St. Louis	2019	2027
82	Nick Kimble	Democratic	St. Louis	2025	2033
83	Ray Reed	Democratic	St. Louis	2025	2033
84	Del Taylor	Democratic	St. Louis	2023	2031
85	Yolonda Fountain Henderson	Democratic	St. Louis	2023	2031
86	Jeff Hales	Democratic	St. Louis	2025	2033
87	Connie Steinmetz	Democratic	Maryland Heights	2025	2033
88	Holly Jones	Republican	Eureka	2023	2031
89	George J. Hruza	Republican	St. Louis	2025	2033
90	Mark Boyko	Democratic	Kirkwood	2025	2033
91	Jo Doll	Democratic	Webster Groves	2021	2029
92	Michael Burton	Democratic	Lakeshire	2021	2029
93	Bridget Walsh Moore	Democratic	St. Louis	2021	2029
94	Jim Murphy	Republican	St. Louis	2019	2027
95	Vacant			2025	
96	Brad Christ	Republican	St. Louis	2023	2031
97	David Casteel	Republican	High Ridge	2023	2031
98	Jaclyn Zimmermann	Democratic	Manchester	2025	2033
99	Vacant			2026	
100	Philip Oehlerking	Republican	Ballwin	2023	2031
101	Ben Keathley	Republican	Chesterfield	2023	2031
102	Richard West	Republican	Wentzville	2021	2029
103	Dave Hinman	Republican	O'Fallon	2023	2031
104	Terri Violet	Republican	St. Peters	2025	2033
105	Colin Wellenkamp	Republican	St. Charles	2025	2033
106	Travis Wilson	Republican	St. Charles	2023	2031
107	Mark Matthiesen	Republican	O'Fallon	2023	2031
108	Mike Costlow	Republican	Dardenne Prairie	2025	2033
109	John Simmons	Republican	Washington	2025	2033
110	Vacant			2025	
111	Cecelie Williams	Republican	Dittmer	2025	2033
112	Renee Reuter	Republican	Imperial	2023	2031
113	Phil Amato	Republican	Arnold	2023	2031
114	Vacant			2025	
115	Bill Lucas	Republican	De Soto	2025	2033
116	Dale Wright	Republican	Farmington	2019	2027
117	Becky Laubinger	Republican	Park Hills	2025	2033
118	Mike McGirl	Republican	Potosi	2019	2027
119	Brad Banderman	Republican	St. Clair	2023	2031
120	John Hewkin	Republican	Cuba	2025	2033
121	Bill Hardwick	Republican	Waynesville	2021	2029
122	Tara Peters	Republican	Rolla	2023	2031
123	Jeff Vernetti	Republican	Camdenton	2025	2033
124	Don Mayhew	Republican	Crocker	2019	2027
125	Dane Diehl	Republican	Butler	2023	2031
126	Jim Kalberloh	Republican	Lowry City	2021	2029
127	Ann Kelley	Republican	Lamar	2019	2027
128	Christopher Warwick	Republican	Bolivar	2025	2033
129	John Black	Republican	Marshfield	2019	2027
130	Bishop Davidson	Republican	Republic	2021	2029
131	Bill Owen	Republican	Springfield	2021	2029
132	Jeremy Dean	Democratic	Springfield	2025	2033
133	Melanie Stinnett	Republican	Springfield	2023	2031
134	Alex Riley	Republican	Springfield	2021	2029
135	Betsy Fogle	Democratic	Springfield	2021	2029
136	Stephanie Hein	Democratic	Springfield	2023	2031
137	Darin Chappell	Republican	Rogersville	2023	2031
138	Burt Whaley	Republican	Clever	2025	2033
139	Bob Titus	Republican	Billings	2023	2031
140	Jamie Gragg	Republican	Ozark	2023	2031
141	Melissa Schmidt	Republican	Eldridge	2025	2033
142	Jeff Knight	Republican	Lebanon	2018	2027
143	Bennie Cook	Republican	Houston	2021	2029
144	Tony Harbison	Republican	Arcadia	2025	2033
145	Bryant Wolfin	Republican	Ste. Genevieve	2025	2033
146	Barry Hovis	Republican	Whitewater	2019	2027
147	John Voss	Republican	Cape Girardeau	2023	2031
148	David Dolan	Republican	Sikeston	2025	2033
149	Vacant			2025	
150	Cameron Parker	Republican	Deering	2023	2031
151	Steve Jordan	Republican	Advance	2025	2033
152	Hardy Billington	Republican	Poplar Bluff	2019	2027
153	Keith Elliott	Republican	Doniphan	2025	2033
154	Lisa Durnell	Republican	Willow Springs	2025	2033
155	Matthew Overcast	Republican	Ava	2025	2033
156	Brian Seitz	Republican	Branson	2021	2029
157	Mitch Boggs	Republican	La Russell	2021	2029
158	Scott Cupps	Republican	Shell Knob	2020	2027
159	Vacant			2026	
160	Vacant			2025	
161	Lane Roberts	Republican	Joplin	2019	2027
162	Bob Bromley	Republican	Carl Junction	2019	2027
163	Cathy Jo Loy	Republican	Carthage	2025	2033

== Standing committees ==
These are the yearly recurring committees that hold hearings on legislation filed by Representatives. Once filed, legislation is assigned to one of the following committees by the Missouri Speaker of the House. Legislation is typically assigned to the committee whose province envelopes the subject matter of the bill. However, there are frequently multiple relevant committees to which a bill can be assigned, and it is at the Speaker's discretion to choose which committee receives the bill. Politics can also play a part, as the Speaker may assign a bill to a committee with an unfriendly chair or membership, or may select a more friendly committee.

The partisan makeup of each committee is intended to reflect as closely as possible the partisan makeup of the entire House. Each Party caucus selects which of its members will serve on the Standing Committees, and the chair of each committee is chosen by the Speaker of the House.

Standing Committee List
Committee	Chair	Vice-chair
Administration and Accounts	Peggy McGaugh	Richard West
Agriculture	Doyle Justus	Willard Haley
Budget	Dirk Deaton	Bishop Davidson
Children and Families	Holly Jones	Tara Peters
Commerce	David Casteel	Travis Wilson
Consent and Procedure	Sean Pouche	Barry Hovis
Conservation and Natural Resources	Jeff Farnan	Bruce Sassmann
Corrections and Public Institutions	Don Mayhew	Bennie Cook
Crime and Public Safety	Jeff Myers	Jim Schulte
Economic Development	Sherri Gallick	Terry Thompson
Elections	Rodger Reedy	Peggy McGaugh
Elementary and Secondary Education	Ed Lewis	Brad Banderman
Emerging Issues	Brad Christ	Tara Peters
Ethics	Lane Roberts	Marlon Anderson
Financial Institutions	Bill Owen	Philip Oehlerking
Fiscal Review	Jim Murphy	David Casteel
General Laws	Ben Keathley	Jamie Gragg
Government Efficiency	Wendy Hausman	Don Mayhew
Health and Mental Health	Melanie Stinnett	Kent Haden
Higher Education and Workforce Development	Chris Brown	Sherri Gallick
Insurance	Dane Diehl	Mark Matthiesen
Judiciary	Cameron Parker	Renee Reuter
Local Government	Dave Hinman	Phil Amato
Legislative Review	Brad Pollitt	Josh Hurlbert
Pensions	Barry Hovis	Bill Allen
Professional Registration and Licensing	Jeff Knight	Cameron Parker
Transportation	Josh Hurlbert	Danny Busick
Utilities	Bob Bromley	John Simmons
Veterans and Armed Forces	Dave Griffith	Jim Schulte
Ways and Means	Mike McGirl	Michael Davis

== Budget committee and subcommittees ==
Tradition in the Missouri General Assembly is that all appropriations bills initiate in the Missouri House rather than the Senate. So each year, the chair of the House Budget Committee files legislation establishing the spending plan for the state of Missouri. This plan, which in 2007 exceeded $20 billion, may differ greatly from the Governor's budget recommendations, issued at the State of the State address given in late January.

The budget legislation is assigned to the House Budget Committee, which then assigns each bill to its respective subcommittee. After the subcommittee makes its recommendations, the full Budget Committee runs through the entire appropriations package, makes its desired changes, and sends the bill to the full House for consideration.

Committee	Chair	Vice-chair
Joint Committee on Legislative Research – Oversight Subcommittee	Sen. Barbara Washington	
Joint Committee on Legislative Research – Personnel Subcommittee	Rep. Dirk Deaton	Sen. Mike Bernskoetter
Joint Committee on Legislative Research – Revision Subcommittee	Sen. Mike Bernskoetter	
Joint Committee on the Justice System – The Missouri Criminal Code Subcommittee		
Appropriations – Agriculture, Conservation, Natural Resources, and Economic Development	Mitch Boggs	Scott Cupps
Appropriations – Education	Bishop Davidson	Ed Lewis
Appropriations – General Administration	John Voss	Louis Riggs
Appropriations – Health, Mental Health, and Social Services	Darin Chappell	John Black
Appropriations – Public Safety, Corrections, Transportation and Revenue	Mike Steinmeyer	Don Mayhew

== Joint committees ==
Joint Committees contain members from both the Missouri House and Senate. These committees may be permanent and study ongoing issues, or may be temporary and intended to come up with suggested legislation to address a one-time issue. The Chair of these committees typically alternates annually between a Representative and a Senator to prevent unfairness to one chamber.

- Joint Committee on Administrative Rules
- Joint Committee on Capitol Security
- Joint Committee on Child Abuse and Neglect
- Joint Committee on Disaster Preparedness and Awareness
- Joint Committee on Education
- Joint Committee on Government Accountability
- Joint Committee on the Justice System
- Joint Committee on Legislative Research (three subcommittees)
- Joint Committee on the Life Sciences
- Joint Committee on Public Assistance
- Joint Committee on Public Employee Retirement
- Joint Committee on Tax Policy
- Joint Committee on Transportation Oversight

== Term limits ==
In 1992, Missouri voters approved constitutional amendment placing term limits on the Missouri House of Representatives. A Representative can serve no more than four two-year terms in the house. The first time term limits prevented someone from running again was in 2002.

== Political party strength ==
Since 2003, the Republican Party has held this chamber of the Missouri General Assembly.

== See also ==
- Missouri Legislature
- Missouri Senate
- List of Missouri General Assemblies
- Government of Missouri
