= 2022 Missouri House of Representatives election =

- November 8, 2022

All 163 seats in the Missouri House of Representatives 82 seats needed for a majority
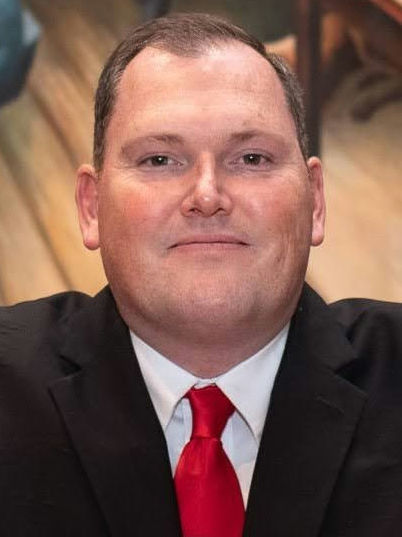
| | Majority party | Minority party |
|---|---|---|
| Leader | Rob Vescovo | Crystal Quade |
| Party | Republican | Democratic |
| Leader's seat | 112th - Arnold (term-limited) | 132nd - Springfield |
| Last election | 114 | 49 |
| Seats after | 111 | 52 |
| Seat change | ▼3 | ▲3 |
| Popular vote | 1,233,795 | 627,512 |
| Percentage | 65.79% | 33.46% |
| Swing | ▲3.14(pp) | ▼3.30%(pp) |
- Republican gain Democratic gain Republican hold Democratic hold 40–50% 50–60% 60–70% 70–80% 80–90% >90% 50–60% 60–70% 70–80% 80–90% >90%
Speaker before election
Rob Vescovo
Republican
Elected Speaker
Dean Plocher
Republican

The 2022 Missouri House of Representatives election took place on Tuesday, November 8, 2022, with the primary election held on Tuesday, August 2, 2022. Missouri voters selected state representatives in all 163 seats of the House of Representatives to serve two-year terms.

The election coincided with United States national elections and Missouri state elections, including U.S. Senate, U.S. House, Auditor, and Missouri Senate. Following the previous election in 2020, Republicans held a 114-to-49-seat supermajority over Democrats. There was one special election during the legislative term. Representative Kip Kendrick (D) of District 45 resigned on January 6, 2021. David Tyson Smith (D) won the subsequent special election, holding the seat for his party. Going into election day, there were eight vacancies in the chamber: seven vacancies had been held by Republicans and one vacancy had been a Democratic seat. Therefore, on election day 2022, there were 107 Republicans, 48 Democrats, and eight open seats. (Note: There were eight vacancies going into election day 2022. Seven vacancies had been held by Republicans and one by a Democrat. Representative Rick Roeber (R) of District 34 was expelled on April 21, 2021. Representative Tom Hannegan (R) of District 65 died on October 20, 2021. Representative Becky Ruth (R) of District 114 resigned on November 30, 2021. Representative Wayne Wallingford (R) of District 147 resigned on January 3, 2022. Representative Justin Hill (R) of District 108 resigned on January 5, 2022. Representative Aaron Griesheimer (R) of District 61 resigned on January 6, 2022. Representative Rory Rowland (D) of District 29 resigned on April 17, 2022. Representative Tricia Derges (R) of District 140 resigned on July 1, 2022.) Republicans maintained the supermajority in 2022, winning 111 seats. At 52 members, Democrats gained their largest share of House seats since 2012.

These were the first elections in Missouri following the 2020 United States redistricting cycle, which resulted in redrawn legislative district boundaries.

== Special Election ==
Sources for special election results:

=== 2021 Special: District 45 ===
General Election Results
| Party | Candidate | Votes | % |
|---|---|---|---|
| Democratic | David Tyson Smith | 1,801 | 75.20% |
| Republican | Glenn Nielsen | 594 | 24.80% |
| Total votes | | 2,395 | 100.00% |
| Democratic hold | | | |

== Predictions ==
| Source | Ranking | As of |
|---|---|---|
| Sabato's Crystal Ball | Safe R | May 19, 2022 |

== Overview ==
=== Election ===
2022 Missouri House of Representatives election General election — November 8, 2022
Missouri_State_House_2022
| Party | Votes | Percentage | Seats | +/– |
| Republican | 1,233,795 | 65.79 | 111 | ▼3 |
| Democratic | 627,512 | 33.46 | 52 | ▲3 |
| Libertarian | 11,705 | 0.62 | 0 | |
| Constitution | 1,809 | 0.10 | 0 | |
| Independents | 518 | 0.03 | 0 | |
| Write-In | 10 | 0.00 | 0 | |
| Valid votes | 1,875,430 | 100 | — | — |
| Invalid votes | — | — | — | — |
| Totals | 1,875,430 | 100 | 163 | — |

=== Closest races ===
Seats where the margin of victory was under 10%:

1. District 17, 0.32% (gain)
2. District 34, 0.34% (gain)
3. District 105, 0.91%
4. District 100, 1.10%
5. District 136, 1.48% (gain)
6. District 92, 2.34%
7. District 98, 3.02% (gain)
8. District 29, 4.20%
9. District 12, 4.32%
10. District 21, 4.42%
11. District 47, 4.50% (gain)
12. District 133, 4.78%
13. District 101, 6.43%
14. District 14, 6.44%
15. District 30, 8.56%
16. District 96, 8.91%
17. District 106, 9.02%
18. District 93, 9.34%

== Summary of results by House of Representatives district ==
Italics denote an open seat held by the incumbent party; bold text denotes a gain for a party.

| House District | Incumbent | Party | Elected Representative | Party |
|---|---|---|---|---|
| 1 | Allen Andrews | Rep | Jeff Farnan | Rep |
| 2 | J. Eggleston | Rep | Mazzie Christensen | Rep |
| 3 | Danny Busick | Rep | Danny Busick | Rep |
| 4 | Greg Sharpe | Rep | Greg Sharpe | Rep |
| 5 | Louis Riggs | Rep | Louis Riggs | Rep |
| 6 | Ed Lewis | Rep | Ed Lewis | Rep |
| 7 | Rusty Black | Rep | Peggy McGaugh (Note: Redistricted from district 39 to 7.) | Rep |
| 8 | Randy Railsback (Note: Redistricted from district 8 to 2 and lost re-election.) | Rep | Josh Hurlbert (Note: Redistricted from district 12 to 8.) | Rep |
| 9 | Dean Van Schoiack | Rep | Dean Van Schoiack | Rep |
| 10 | Bill Falkner | Rep | Bill Falkner | Rep |
| 11 | Brenda Shields | Rep | Brenda Shields | Rep |
| 12 | Josh Hurlbert | Rep | Jamie Johnson | **Dem** |
| 13 | Sean Pouche | Rep | Sean Pouche | Rep |
| 14 | Ashley Aune | Dem | Ashley Aune | Dem |
| 15 | Maggie Nurrenbern | Dem | Maggie Nurrenbern | Dem |
| 16 | Chris Brown | Rep | Chris Brown | Rep |
| 17 | Mark Ellebracht | Dem | Bill Allen | **Rep** |
| 18 | Wes Rogers | Dem | Eric Woods | Dem |
| 19 | Ingrid Burnett | Dem | Ingrid Burnett | Dem |
| 20 | Bill Kidd | Rep | Aaron McMullen | Rep |
| 21 | Robert Sauls | Dem | Robert Sauls | Dem |
| 22 | Yolanda Young | Dem | Yolanda Young | Dem |
| 23 | Michael Johnson | Dem | Michael Johnson | Dem |
| 24 | Emily Weber | Dem | Emily Weber | Dem |
| 25 | Patty Lewis | Dem | Patty Lewis | Dem |
| 26 | Ashley Bland Manlove | Dem | Ashley Bland Manlove | Dem |
| 27 | Richard Brown | Dem | Richard Brown | Dem |
| 28 | Jerome Barnes | Dem | Jerome Barnes | Dem |
| 29 | Vacant (Note: Representative Rory Rowland (D) of District 29 resigned on April 17, 2022.) | | **Aaron Crossley** | **Dem** |
| 30 | Jonathan Patterson | Rep | Jonathan Patterson | Rep |
| 31 | Dan Stacy | Rep | Dan Stacy | Rep |
| 32 | Jeff Coleman | Rep | Jeff Coleman | Rep |
| 33 | Chris Sander | Rep | Chris Sander | Rep |
| 34 | Vacant (Note: Representative Rick Roeber (R) of District 34 was expelled on April 21, 2021.) | | **Kemp Strickler** | **Dem** |
| 35 | Keri Ingle | Dem | Keri Ingle | Dem |
| 36 | Mark Sharp (Note: Redistricted from district 36 to 37.) | Dem | Anthony Ealy | Dem |
| 37 | Annette Turnbaugh (Note: Redistricted from district 37 to 36 and lost re-election.) | Dem | Mark Sharp | Dem |
| 38 | Doug Richey (Note: Redistricted from district 38 to 39.) | Rep | Chris Lonsdale | Rep |
| 39 | Peggy McGaugh | Rep | Doug Richey | Rep |
| 40 | Chad Perkins | Rep | Chad Perkins | Rep |
| 41 | Randy Pietzman | Rep | Doyle Justus | Rep |
| 42 | Jeff Porter | Rep | Jeff Myers | Rep |
| 43 | Kent Haden | Rep | Kent Haden | Rep |
| 44 | Cheri Toalson Reisch | Rep | Cheri Toalson Reisch | Rep |
| 45 | David Tyson Smith (Note: Redistricted from district 45 to 46.) | Dem | Kathy Steinhoff | Dem |
| 46 | Martha Stevens | Dem | David Tyson Smith | Dem |
| 47 | Chuck Basye | Rep | **Adrian Plank** | **Dem** |
| 48 | Tim Taylor | Rep | Tim Taylor | Rep |
| 49 | Travis Fitzwater | Rep | Jim Schulte | Rep |
| 50 | Sara Walsh | Rep | **Douglas Mann** | **Dem** |
| 51 | Kurtis Gregory | Rep | Kurtis Gregory | Rep |
| 52 | Brad Pollitt | Rep | Brad Pollitt | Rep |
| 53 | Terry Thompson | Rep | Terry Thompson | Rep |
| 54 | Dan Houx | Rep | Dan Houx | Rep |
| 55 | Mike Haffner | Rep | Mike Haffner | Rep |
| 56 | Michael Davis | Rep | Michael Davis | Rep |
| 57 | Rodger Reedy | Rep | Rodger Reedy | Rep |
| 58 | Willard Haley | Rep | Willard Haley | Rep |
| 59 | Rudy Veit | Rep | Rudy Veit | Rep |
| 60 | Dave Griffith | Rep | Dave Griffith | Rep |
| 61 | Vacant (Note: Representative Aaron Griesheimer (R) of District 61 resigned on January 6, 2022.) | | **Bruce Sassmann** (Note: Redistricted from district 62 to 61.) | **Rep** |
| 62 | Bruce Sassmann | Rep | Sherri Gallick | Rep |
| 63 | Richard West (Note: Redistricted from district 63 to 102.) | Rep | Tricia Byrnes | Rep |
| 64 | Tony Lovasco | Rep | Tony Lovasco | Rep |
| 65 | Vacant (Note: Representative Tom Hannegan (R) of District 65 died on October 20, 2021.) | | **Wendy Hausman** | **Rep** |
| 66 | Marlene Terry | Dem | Marlene Terry | Dem |
| 67 | Neil Smith | Dem | Chantelle Nickson-Clark | Dem |
| 68 | Jay Mosley | Dem | Jay Mosley | Dem |
| 69 | Gretchen Bangert (Note: Redistricted from district 69 to 70.) | Dem | **Adam Schnelting** (Note: Redistricted from district 104 to 69.) | **Rep** |
| 70 | Paula Brown (Note: Redistricted from district 70 to 87.) | Dem | Gretchen Bangert | Dem |
| 71 | LaDonna Appelbaum | Dem | LaDonna Appelbaum | Dem |
| 72 | Doug Clemens | Dem | Doug Clemens | Dem |
| 73 | Raychel Proudie | Dem | Raychel Proudie | Dem |
| 74 | Michael Person (Note: Redistricted from district 74 to 73 and lost re-election.) | Dem | Kevin Windham Jr. (Note: Redistricted from district 85 to 74.) | Dem |
| 75 | Alan Gray | Dem | Alan Gray | Dem |
| 76 | Marlon Anderson | Dem | Marlon Anderson | Dem |
| 77 | Kimberly-Ann Collins | Dem | Kimberly-Ann Collins | Dem |
| 78 | Rasheen Aldridge Jr. | Dem | Rasheen Aldridge Jr. | Dem |
| 79 | LaKeySha Frazier-Bosley | Dem | LaKeySha Frazier-Bosley | Dem |
| 80 | Peter Merideth | Dem | Peter Merideth | Dem |
| 81 | Steve Butz | Dem | Steve Butz | Dem |
| 82 | Donna Baringer | Dem | Donna Baringer | Dem |
| 83 | Jo Doll (Note: Redistricted from district 83 to 91.) | Dem | Sarah Unsicker (Note: Redistricted from district 91 to 83.) | Dem |
| 84 | Wiley Price IV | Dem | Del Taylor | Dem |
| 85 | Kevin Windham Jr. | Dem | Yolonda Fountain Henderson | Dem |
| 86 | Joe Adams | Dem | Joe Adams | Dem |
| 87 | Ian Mackey (Note: Redistricted from district 87 to 99.) | Dem | Paula Brown | Dem |
| 88 | Tracy McCreery | Dem | Holly Jones | **Rep** |
| 89 | Dean Plocher | Rep | Dean Plocher | Rep |
| 90 | Barbara Phifer | Dem | Barbara Phifer | Dem |
| 91 | Sarah Unsicker | Dem | Jo Doll | Dem |
| 92 | Michael Burton | Dem | Michael Burton | Dem |
| 93 | Bridget Walsh Moore | Dem | Bridget Walsh Moore | Dem |
| 94 | Jim Murphy | Rep | Jim Murphy | Rep |
| 95 | Michael O'Donnell | Rep | Michael O'Donnell | Rep |
| 96 | David Gregory | Rep | Brad Christ | Rep |
| 97 | Mary Elizabeth Coleman | Rep | David Casteel | Rep |
| 98 | Shamed Dogan | Rep | **Deb Lavender** | **Dem** |
| 99 | Trish Gunby | Dem | Ian Mackey | Dem |
| 100 | Derek Grier | Rep | Philip Oehlerking | Rep |
| 101 | Bruce DeGroot (Note: Representative Bruce DeGroot was redistricted from district 101 to 110. After winning the Republican primary in the 110th, he withdrew from the election. Justin Sparks was chosen as the replacement candidate by the Republican Central Committee.) | Rep | Ben Keathley | Rep |
| 102 | Ron Hicks | Rep | Richard West | Rep |
| 103 | John Wiemann | Rep | Dave Hinman | Rep |
| 104 | Adam Schnelting | Rep | Phil Christofanelli (Note: Redistricted from district 105 to 104.) | Rep |
| 105 | Phil Christofanelli | Rep | Adam Schwadron (Note: Redistricted from district 106 to 105.) | Rep |
| 106 | Adam Schwadron | Rep | Travis Wilson | Rep |
| 107 | Nick Schroer | Rep | Mark Matthiesen | Rep |
| 108 | Vacant (Note: Representative Justin Hill (R) of District 108 resigned on January 5, 2022.) | | **Justin Hicks** | **Rep** |
| 109 | John Simmons | Rep | Kyle Marquart | Rep |
| 110 | Dottie Bailey | Rep | Justin Sparks | Rep |
| 111 | Shane Roden | Rep | Gary Bonacker | Rep |
| 112 | Rob Vescovo | Rep | Renee Reuter | Rep |
| 113 | Dan Shaul | Rep | Phil Amato | Rep |
| 114 | Vacant (Note: Representative Becky Ruth (R) of District 114 resigned on November 30, 2021.) | | **Ken Waller** | **Rep** |
| 115 | Cyndi Buchheit-Courtway | Rep | Cyndi Buchheit-Courtway | Rep |
| 116 | Dale Wright | Rep | Dale Wright | Rep |
| 117 | Mike Henderson | Rep | Mike Henderson | Rep |
| 118 | Mike McGirl | Rep | Mike McGirl | Rep |
| 119 | Nate Tate | Rep | Brad Banderman | Rep |
| 120 | Jason Chipman | Rep | Ron Copeland (Note: Redistricted from district 143 to 120.) | Rep |
| 121 | Don Mayhew (Note: Redistricted from district 121 to 124.) | Rep | Bill Hardwick (Note: Redistricted from district 122 to 121.) | Rep |
| 122 | Bill Hardwick | Rep | Tara Peters | Rep |
| 123 | Suzie Pollock | Rep | Lisa Thomas (Note: Redistricted from district 124 to 123.) | Rep |
| 124 | Lisa Thomas | Rep | Don Mayhew | Rep |
| 125 | Jim Kalberloh (Note: Redistricted from district 125 to 126.) | Rep | Dane Diehl | Rep |
| 126 | Patricia Pike | Rep | Jim Kalberloh | Rep |
| 127 | Ann Kelley | Rep | Ann Kelley | Rep |
| 128 | Mike Stephens | Rep | Mike Stephens | Rep |
| 129 | Jeff Knight (Note: Redistricted from district 129 to 142.) | Rep | John Black (Note: Redistricted from district 137 to 129.) | Rep |
| 130 | Bishop Davidson | Rep | Bishop Davidson | Rep |
| 131 | Bill Owen | Rep | Bill Owen | Rep |
| 132 | Crystal Quade | Dem | Crystal Quade | Dem |
| 133 | Curtis Trent | Rep | Melanie Stinnett | Rep |
| 134 | Alex Riley | Rep | Alex Riley | Rep |
| 135 | Betsy Fogle | Dem | Betsy Fogle | Dem |
| 136 | Craig Fishel | Rep | **Stephanie Hein** | **Dem** |
| 137 | John Black | Rep | Darin Chappell | Rep |
| 138 | Brad Hudson | Rep | Brad Hudson | Rep |
| 139 | Jered Taylor | Rep | Bob Titus | Rep |
| 140 | Vacant (Note: Representative Tricia Derges (R) of District 140 resigned on July 1, 2022.) | | **Jamie Gragg** | **Rep** |
| 141 | Hannah Kelly | Rep | Hannah Kelly | Rep |
| 142 | Bennie Cook (Note: Redistricted from district 142 to 143.) | Rep | Jeff Knight | Rep |
| 143 | Ron Copeland | Rep | Bennie Cook | Rep |
| 144 | Chris Dinkins | Rep | Chris Dinkins | Rep |
| 145 | Rick Francis | Rep | Rick Francis | Rep |
| 146 | Barry Hovis | Rep | Barry Hovis | Rep |
| 147 | Vacant (Note: Representative Wayne Wallingford (R) of District 147 resigned on January 3, 2022.) | | **John Voss** | **Rep** |
| 148 | Jamie Burger | Rep | Jamie Burger | Rep |
| 149 | Don Rone Jr. | Rep | Donnie Brown | Rep |
| 150 | Andrew McDaniel | Rep | Cameron Parker | Rep |
| 151 | Herman Morse | Rep | Herman Morse | Rep |
| 152 | Hardy Billington | Rep | Hardy Billington | Rep |
| 153 | Darrell Atchison | Rep | Darrell Atchison | Rep |
| 154 | David Evans | Rep | David Evans | Rep |
| 155 | Travis Smith | Rep | Travis Smith | Rep |
| 156 | Brian Seitz | Rep | Brian Seitz | Rep |
| 157 | Mitch Boggs | Rep | Mitch Boggs | Rep |
| 158 | Scott Cupps | Rep | Scott Cupps | Rep |
| 159 | Dirk Deaton | Rep | Dirk Deaton | Rep |
| 160 | Ben Baker | Rep | Ben Baker | Rep |
| 161 | Lane Roberts | Rep | Lane Roberts | Rep |
| 162 | Bob Bromley | Rep | Bob Bromley | Rep |
| 163 | Cody Smith | Rep | Cody Smith | Rep |

== Detailed Results by House of Representatives District ==
Sources for election results:

=== District 1 ===
Primary Election Results
| Party | Candidate | Votes | % |
Republican Party Primary Results
| Republican | Jeff Farnan | 3,338 | 47.33% |
| Republican | Alan Bennett | 1,795 | 25.45% |
| Republican | Holly Kay Cronk | 987 | 13.99% |
| Republican | Jasper Logan | 534 | 7.57% |
| Republican | Michelle Horner | 399 | 5.66% |
| Total votes | | 7,053 | 100.00% |
Democratic Party Primary Results
| Democratic | Jess Piper | 1,094 | 100.00% |
| Total votes | | 1,094 | 100.00% |

General Election Results
| Party | Candidate | Votes | % |
|---|---|---|---|
| Republican | Jeff Farnan | 9,762 | 75.17% |
| Democratic | Jess Piper | 3,225 | 24.83% |
| Total votes | | 12,987 | 100.00% |
| Republican hold | | | |

=== District 2 ===
Primary Election Results
| Party | Candidate | Votes | % |
Republican Party Primary Results
| Republican | Mazzie Boyd | 4,661 | 61.82% |
| Republican | Randy Railsback (incumbent) | 2,879 | 38.18% |
| Total votes | | 7,540 | 100.00% |
Democratic Party Primary Results
| Democratic | Lois Pontius | 639 | 100.00% |
| Total votes | | 639 | 100.00% |

General Election Results
| Party | Candidate | Votes | % |
|---|---|---|---|
| Republican | Mazzie Boyd | 10,606 | 82.70% |
| Democratic | Lois Pontius | 2,219 | 17.30% |
| Total votes | | 12,825 | 100.00% |
| Republican hold | | | |

=== District 3 ===
Primary Election Results
| Party | Candidate | Votes | % |
Republican Party Primary Results
| Republican | Danny Busick (incumbent) | 3,542 | 76.34% |
| Republican | Gary M. Ewing | 1,098 | 23.66% |
| Total votes | | 4,640 | 100.00% |

General Election Results
| Party | Candidate | Votes | % |
|---|---|---|---|
| Republican | Danny Busick (incumbent) | 9,529 | 100.00% |
| Total votes | | 9,529 | 100.00% |
| Republican hold | | | |

=== District 4 ===
Primary Election Results
| Party | Candidate | Votes | % |
Republican Party Primary Results
| Republican | Greg Sharpe (incumbent) | 4,857 | 100.00% |
| Total votes | | 4,857 | 100.00% |

General Election Results
| Party | Candidate | Votes | % |
|---|---|---|---|
| Republican | Greg Sharpe (incumbent) | 10,930 | 100.00% |
| Total votes | | 10,930 | 100.00% |
| Republican hold | | | |

=== District 5 ===
Primary Election Results
| Party | Candidate | Votes | % |
Republican Party Primary Results
| Republican | Louis Riggs (incumbent) | 5,170 | 100.00% |
| Total votes | | 5,170 | 100.00% |

General Election Results
| Party | Candidate | Votes | % |
|---|---|---|---|
| Republican | Louis Riggs (incumbent) | 10,865 | 100.00% |
| Total votes | | 10,865 | 100.00% |
| Republican hold | | | |

=== District 6 ===
Primary Election Results
| Party | Candidate | Votes | % |
Republican Party Primary Results
| Republican | Ed Lewis (incumbent) | 3,851 | 100.00% |
| Total votes | | 3,851 | 100.00% |

General Election Results
| Party | Candidate | Votes | % |
|---|---|---|---|
| Republican | Ed Lewis (incumbent) | 10,497 | 100.00% |
| Total votes | | 10,497 | 100.00% |
| Republican hold | | | |

=== District 7 ===
Primary Election Results
| Party | Candidate | Votes | % |
Republican Party Primary Results
| Republican | Peggy McGaugh (incumbent) | 5,068 | 100.00% |
| Total votes | | 5,068 | 100.00% |
Democratic Party Primary Results
| Democratic | Joshua Vance | 879 | 100.00% |
| Total votes | | 879 | 100.00% |

General Election Results
| Party | Candidate | Votes | % |
|---|---|---|---|
| Republican | Peggy McGaugh (incumbent) | 10,862 | 80.76% |
| Democratic | Joshua Vance | 2,587 | 19.24% |
| Total votes | | 13,449 | 100.00% |
| Republican hold | | | |

=== District 8 ===
Primary Election Results
| Party | Candidate | Votes | % |
Republican Party Primary Results
| Republican | Josh Hurlbert (incumbent) | 3,973 | 100.00% |
| Total votes | | 3,973 | 100.00% |
Democratic Party Primary Results
| Democratic | Alyssa Dial | 1,900 | 100.00% |
| Total votes | | 1,900 | 100.00% |

General Election Results
| Party | Candidate | Votes | % |
|---|---|---|---|
| Republican | Josh Hurlbert (incumbent) | 10,204 | 67.97% |
| Democratic | Alyssa Dial | 4,808 | 32.03% |
| Total votes | | 15,012 | 100.00% |
| Republican hold | | | |

=== District 9 ===
Primary Election Results
| Party | Candidate | Votes | % |
Republican Party Primary Results
| Republican | Dean VanSchoiack (incumbent) | 4,962 | 100.00% |
| Total votes | | 4,962 | 100.00% |

General Election Results
| Party | Candidate | Votes | % |
|---|---|---|---|
| Republican | Dean VanSchoiack (incumbent) | 10,803 | 100.00% |
| Total votes | | 10,803 | 100.00% |
| Republican hold | | | |

=== District 10 ===
Primary Election Results
| Party | Candidate | Votes | % |
Republican Party Primary Results
| Republican | Bill Falkner (incumbent) | 2,440 | 100.00% |
| Total votes | | 2,440 | 100.00% |

General Election Results
| Party | Candidate | Votes | % |
|---|---|---|---|
| Republican | Bill Falkner (incumbent) | 7,271 | 100.00% |
| Total votes | | 7,271 | 100.00% |
| Republican hold | | | |

=== District 11 ===
Primary Election Results
| Party | Candidate | Votes | % |
Republican Party Primary Results
| Republican | Brenda Shields (incumbent) | 3,588 | 100.00% |
| Total votes | | 3,588 | 100.00% |

General Election Results
| Party | Candidate | Votes | % |
|---|---|---|---|
| Republican | Brenda Shields (incumbent) | 9,944 | 100.00% |
| Total votes | | 9,944 | 100.00% |
| Republican hold | | | |

=== District 12 ===
Primary Election Results
| Party | Candidate | Votes | % |
Republican Party Primary Results
| Republican | Tom Hutsler | 2,505 | 100.00% |
| Total votes | | 2,505 | 100.00% |
Democratic Party Primary Results
| Democratic | Jamie Johnson | 2,803 | 100.00% |
| Total votes | | 2,803 | 100.00% |

General Election Results
| Party | Candidate | Votes | % |
|---|---|---|---|
| Democratic | Jamie Johnson | 7,399 | 52.16% |
| Republican | Tom Hutsler | 6,785 | 47.84% |
| Total votes | | 14,184 | 100.00% |
| Democratic gain from Republican | | | |

=== District 13 ===
Primary Election Results
| Party | Candidate | Votes | % |
Republican Party Primary Results
| Republican | Sean Pouche (incumbent) | 3,936 | 100.00% |
| Total votes | | 3,936 | 100.00% |

General Election Results
| Party | Candidate | Votes | % |
|---|---|---|---|
| Republican | Sean Pouche (incumbent) | 12,405 | 100.00% |
| Total votes | | 12,405 | 100.00% |
| Republican hold | | | |

=== District 14 ===
Primary Election Results
| Party | Candidate | Votes | % |
Democratic Party Primary Results
| Democratic | Ashley Aune (incumbent) | 3,215 | 100.00% |
| Total votes | | 3,215 | 100.00% |
Republican Party Primary Results
| Republican | Eric Holmes | 2,788 | 100.00% |
| Total votes | | 2,788 | 100.00% |

General Election Results
| Party | Candidate | Votes | % |
|---|---|---|---|
| Democratic | Ashley Aune (incumbent) | 7,859 | 53.22% |
| Republican | Eric Holmes | 6,907 | 46.78% |
| Total votes | | 14,766 | 100.00% |
| Democratic hold | | | |

=== District 15 ===
Primary Election Results
| Party | Candidate | Votes | % |
Democratic Party Primary Results
| Democratic | Maggie Nurrenbern (incumbent) | 2,982 | 100.00% |
| Total votes | | 2,982 | 100.00% |
Republican Party Primary Results
| Republican | Adam Richardson | 2,512 | 100.00% |
| Total votes | | 2,512 | 100.00% |

General Election Results
| Party | Candidate | Votes | % |
|---|---|---|---|
| Democratic | Maggie Nurrenbern (incumbent) | 6,920 | 53.34% |
| Republican | Adam Richardson | 5,535 | 42.67% |
| Independent | Steve West | 518 | 3.99% |
| Total votes | | 12,973 | 100.00% |
| Democratic hold | | | |

=== District 16 ===
Primary Election Results
| Party | Candidate | Votes | % |
Republican Party Primary Results
| Republican | Chris Brown (incumbent) | 2,552 | 100.00% |
| Total votes | | 2,552 | 100.00% |
Democratic Party Primary Results
| Democratic | Fantasia Rene Bernauer | 2,424 | 100.00% |
| Total votes | | 2,424 | 100.00% |

General Election Results
| Party | Candidate | Votes | % |
|---|---|---|---|
| Republican | Chris Brown (incumbent) | 7,663 | 58.23% |
| Democratic | Fantasia Rene Bernauer | 5,498 | 41.77% |
| Total votes | | 13,161 | 100.00% |
| Republican hold | | | |

=== District 17 ===
Primary Election Results
| Party | Candidate | Votes | % |
Democratic Party Primary Results
| Democratic | Mark Ellebracht (incumbent) | 2,282 | 100.00% |
| Total votes | | 2,282 | 100.00% |
Republican Party Primary Results
| Republican | Bill Allen | 2,244 | 100.00% |
| Total votes | | 2,244 | 100.00% |

General Election Results
| Party | Candidate | Votes | % |
|---|---|---|---|
| Republican | Bill Allen | 5,785 | 50.21% |
| Democratic | Mark Ellebracht (incumbent) | 5,736 | 49.79% |
| Total votes | | 11,521 | 100.00% |
Recount Results
| Republican | Bill Allen | 5,788 | 50.16% |
| Democratic | Mark Ellebracht (incumbent) | 5,751 | 49.84% |
| Total votes | | 11,539 | 100.00% |
| Republican gain from Democratic | | | |

=== District 18 ===
Primary Election Results
| Party | Candidate | Votes | % |
Democratic Party Primary Results
| Democratic | Eric Woods | 2,749 | 100.00% |
| Total votes | | 2,749 | 100.00% |

General Election Results
| Party | Candidate | Votes | % |
|---|---|---|---|
| Democratic | Eric Woods | 8,049 | 100.00% |
| Total votes | | 8,049 | 100.00% |
| Democratic hold | | | |

=== District 19 ===
Primary Election Results
| Party | Candidate | Votes | % |
Democratic Party Primary Results
| Democratic | Ingrid Burnett (incumbent) | 1,146 | 58.53% |
| Democratic | Wick Thomas | 812 | 41.47% |
| Total votes | | 1,958 | 100.00% |
Republican Party Primary Results
| Republican | Karen I. Spalding | 360 | 100.00% |
| Total votes | | 360 | 100.00% |

General Election Results
| Party | Candidate | Votes | % |
|---|---|---|---|
| Democratic | Ingrid Burnett (incumbent) | 4,099 | 78.34% |
| Republican | Karen I. Spalding | 1,133 | 21.66% |
| Total votes | | 5,232 | 100.00% |
| Democratic hold | | | |

=== District 20 ===
Primary Election Results
| Party | Candidate | Votes | % |
Republican Party Primary Results
| Republican | Aaron McMullen | 2,415 | 100.00% |
| Total votes | | 2,415 | 100.00% |
Democratic Party Primary Results
| Democratic | Mike Englert | 1,946 | 100.00% |
| Total votes | | 1,946 | 100.00% |

General Election Results
| Party | Candidate | Votes | % |
|---|---|---|---|
| Republican | Aaron McMullen | 6,402 | 58.17% |
| Democratic | Mike Englert | 4,604 | 41.83% |
| Total votes | | 11,006 | 100.00% |
| Republican hold | | | |

=== District 21 ===
Primary Election Results
| Party | Candidate | Votes | % |
Democratic Party Primary Results
| Democratic | Robert Sauls (incumbent) | 1,628 | 100.00% |
| Total votes | | 1,628 | 100.00% |
Republican Party Primary Results
| Republican | Dakota Worrell | 1,386 | 100.00% |
| Total votes | | 1,386 | 100.00% |

General Election Results
| Party | Candidate | Votes | % |
|---|---|---|---|
| Democratic | Robert Sauls (incumbent) | 4,033 | 52.21% |
| Republican | Dakota Worrell | 3,691 | 47.79% |
| Total votes | | 7,724 | 100.00% |
| Democratic hold | | | |

=== District 22 ===
Primary Election Results
| Party | Candidate | Votes | % |
Democratic Party Primary Results
| Democratic | Yolanda Young (incumbent) | 2,280 | 79.92% |
| Democratic | Kevon Graves | 390 | 13.67% |
| Democratic | Davitta L. Hanson | 183 | 6.41% |
| Total votes | | 2,853 | 100.00% |

General Election Results
| Party | Candidate | Votes | % |
|---|---|---|---|
| Democratic | Yolanda Young (incumbent) | 6,739 | 100.00% |
| Total votes | | 6,739 | 100.00% |
| Democratic hold | | | |

=== District 23 ===
Primary Election Results
| Party | Candidate | Votes | % |
Democratic Party Primary Results
| Democratic | Michael L. Johnson (incumbent) | 1,936 | 100.00% |
| Total votes | | 1,936 | 100.00% |

General Election Results
| Party | Candidate | Votes | % |
|---|---|---|---|
| Democratic | Michael L. Johnson (incumbent) | 4,555 | 100.00% |
| Total votes | | 4,555 | 100.00% |
| Democratic hold | | | |

=== District 24 ===
Primary Election Results
| Party | Candidate | Votes | % |
Democratic Party Primary Results
| Democratic | Emily Weber (incumbent) | 4,969 | 100.00% |
| Total votes | | 4,969 | 100.00% |

General Election Results
| Party | Candidate | Votes | % |
|---|---|---|---|
| Democratic | Emily Weber (incumbent) | 11,098 | 100.00% |
| Total votes | | 11,098 | 100.00% |
| Democratic hold | | | |

=== District 25 ===
Primary Election Results
| Party | Candidate | Votes | % |
Democratic Party Primary Results
| Democratic | Patty Lewis (incumbent) | 7,529 | 100.00% |
| Total votes | | 7,529 | 100.00% |

General Election Results
| Party | Candidate | Votes | % |
|---|---|---|---|
| Democratic | Patty Lewis (incumbent) | 15,286 | 100.00% |
| Total votes | | 15,286 | 100.00% |
| Democratic hold | | | |

=== District 26 ===
Primary Election Results
| Party | Candidate | Votes | % |
Democratic Party Primary Results
| Democratic | Ashley Bland Manlove (incumbent) | 3,449 | 100.00% |
| Total votes | | 3,449 | 100.00% |

General Election Results
| Party | Candidate | Votes | % |
|---|---|---|---|
| Democratic | Ashley Bland Manlove (incumbent) | 8,057 | 100.00% |
| Total votes | | 8,057 | 100.00% |
| Democratic hold | | | |

=== District 27 ===
Primary Election Results
| Party | Candidate | Votes | % |
Democratic Party Primary Results
| Democratic | Richard Brown (incumbent) | 3,682 | 100.00% |
| Total votes | | 3,682 | 100.00% |

General Election Results
| Party | Candidate | Votes | % |
|---|---|---|---|
| Democratic | Richard Brown (incumbent) | 8,207 | 100.00% |
| Total votes | | 8,207 | 100.00% |
| Democratic hold | | | |

=== District 28 ===
Primary Election Results
| Party | Candidate | Votes | % |
Democratic Party Primary Results
| Democratic | Jerome Barnes (incumbent) | 3,319 | 100.00% |
| Total votes | | 3,319 | 100.00% |
Republican Party Primary Results
| Republican | Jennell Houts | 1,580 | 100.00% |
| Total votes | | 1,580 | 100.00% |

General Election Results
| Party | Candidate | Votes | % |
|---|---|---|---|
| Democratic | Jerome Barnes (incumbent) | 6,917 | 65.29% |
| Republican | Jennell Houts | 3,677 | 34.71% |
| Total votes | | 10,594 | 100.00% |
| Democratic hold | | | |

=== District 29 ===
Primary Election Results
| Party | Candidate | Votes | % |
Democratic Party Primary Results
| Democratic | Aaron Crossley | 2,814 | 100.00% |
| Total votes | | 2,814 | 100.00% |
Republican Party Primary Results
| Republican | David Martin | 1,454 | 48.05% |
| Republican | James Lowman | 935 | 30.90% |
| Republican | Gloria Stone | 637 | 21.05% |
| Total votes | | 3,026 | 100.00% |

General Election Results
| Party | Candidate | Votes | % |
|---|---|---|---|
| Democratic | Aaron Crossley | 6,378 | 52.10% |
| Republican | David Martin | 5,864 | 47.90% |
| Total votes | | 12,242 | 100.00% |
| Democratic win (new seat) | | | |

=== District 30 ===
Primary Election Results
| Party | Candidate | Votes | % |
Republican Party Primary Results
| Republican | Jon Patterson (incumbent) | 3,380 | 100.00% |
| Total votes | | 3,380 | 100.00% |
Democratic Party Primary Results
| Democratic | Sonia M. Nizami | 3,132 | 100.00% |
| Total votes | | 3,132 | 100.00% |

General Election Results
| Party | Candidate | Votes | % |
|---|---|---|---|
| Republican | Jon Patterson (incumbent) | 8,599 | 54.28% |
| Democratic | Sonia M. Nizami | 7,242 | 45.72% |
| Total votes | | 15,841 | 100.00% |
| Republican hold | | | |

=== District 31 ===
Primary Election Results
| Party | Candidate | Votes | % |
Republican Party Primary Results
| Republican | Dan Stacy (incumbent) | 3,291 | 100.00% |
| Total votes | | 3,291 | 100.00% |
Democratic Party Primary Results
| Democratic | Robert McCourt | 2,384 | 100.00% |
| Total votes | | 2,384 | 100.00% |

General Election Results
| Party | Candidate | Votes | % |
|---|---|---|---|
| Republican | Dan Stacy (incumbent) | 7,585 | 56.77% |
| Democratic | Robert McCourt | 5,776 | 43.23% |
| Total votes | | 13,361 | 100.00% |
| Republican hold | | | |

=== District 32 ===
Primary Election Results
| Party | Candidate | Votes | % |
Republican Party Primary Results
| Republican | Jeff Coleman (incumbent) | 3,521 | 100.00% |
| Total votes | | 3,521 | 100.00% |
Democratic Party Primary Results
| Democratic | Janice Brill | 1,549 | 100.00% |
| Total votes | | 1,549 | 100.00% |

General Election Results
| Party | Candidate | Votes | % |
|---|---|---|---|
| Republican | Jeff Coleman (incumbent) | 9,045 | 69.38% |
| Democratic | Janice Brill | 3,991 | 30.62% |
| Total votes | | 13,036 | 100.00% |
| Republican hold | | | |

=== District 33 ===
Primary Election Results
| Party | Candidate | Votes | % |
Republican Party Primary Results
| Republican | Chris Sander (incumbent) | 3,413 | 100.00% |
| Total votes | | 3,413 | 100.00% |

General Election Results
| Party | Candidate | Votes | % |
|---|---|---|---|
| Republican | Chris Sander (incumbent) | 10,449 | 100.00% |
| Total votes | | 10,449 | 100.00% |
| Republican hold | | | |

=== District 34 ===
Primary Election Results
| Party | Candidate | Votes | % |
Democratic Party Primary Results
| Democratic | Kemp Strickler | 2,585 | 100.00% |
| Total votes | | 2,585 | 100.00% |
Republican Party Primary Results
| Republican | J.C. Crossley | 2,533 | 100.00% |
| Total votes | | 2,533 | 100.00% |

General Election Results
| Party | Candidate | Votes | % |
|---|---|---|---|
| Democratic | Kemp Strickler | 6,645 | 50.17% |
| Republican | J.C. Crossley | 6,600 | 49.83% |
| Total votes | | 13,245 | 100.00% |
| Democratic win (new seat) | | | |

=== District 35 ===
Primary Election Results
| Party | Candidate | Votes | % |
Democratic Party Primary Results
| Democratic | Keri Ingle (incumbent) | 3,870 | 100.00% |
| Total votes | | 3,870 | 100.00% |
Republican Party Primary Results
| Republican | John Burrows | 2,732 | 100.00% |
| Total votes | | 2,732 | 100.00% |

General Election Results
| Party | Candidate | Votes | % |
|---|---|---|---|
| Democratic | Keri Ingle (incumbent) | 8,869 | 57.18% |
| Republican | John Burrows | 6,642 | 42.82% |
| Total votes | | 15,511 | 100.00% |
| Democratic hold | | | |

=== District 36 ===
Primary Election Results
| Party | Candidate | Votes | % |
Democratic Party Primary Results
| Democratic | Anthony Ealy | 2,195 | 61.13% |
| Democratic | Annette Turnbaugh (incumbent) | 1,265 | 35.23% |
| Democratic | John D. Boyd, Jr. | 131 | 3.65% |
| Total votes | | 3,591 | 100.00% |
Republican Party Primary Results
| Republican | Kurt Lauvstad | 1,624 | 100.00% |
| Total votes | | 1,624 | 100.00% |

General Election Results
| Party | Candidate | Votes | % |
|---|---|---|---|
| Democratic | Anthony Ealy | 6,548 | 61.73% |
| Republican | Kurt Lauvstad | 4,060 | 38.27% |
| Total votes | | 10,608 | 100.00% |
| Democratic hold | | | |

=== District 37 ===
Primary Election Results
| Party | Candidate | Votes | % |
Democratic Party Primary Results
| Democratic | Mark A. Sharp (incumbent) | 3,480 | 100.00% |
| Total votes | | 3,480 | 100.00% |

General Election Results
| Party | Candidate | Votes | % |
|---|---|---|---|
| Democratic | Mark A. Sharp (incumbent) | 8,055 | 100.00% |
| Total votes | | 8,055 | 100.00% |
| Democratic hold | | | |

=== District 38 ===
Primary Election Results
| Party | Candidate | Votes | % |
Republican Party Primary Results
| Republican | Chris Lonsdale | 2,001 | 53.09% |
| Republican | Eben Hall | 1,768 | 46.91% |
| Total votes | | 3,769 | 100.00% |

General Election Results
| Party | Candidate | Votes | % |
|---|---|---|---|
| Republican | Chris Lonsdale | 10,111 | 100.00% |
| Total votes | | 10,111 | 100.00% |
| Republican hold | | | |

=== District 39 ===
Primary Election Results
| Party | Candidate | Votes | % |
Republican Party Primary Results
| Republican | Doug Richey (incumbent) | 3,437 | 100.00% |
| Total votes | | 3,437 | 100.00% |

General Election Results
| Party | Candidate | Votes | % |
|---|---|---|---|
| Republican | Doug Richey (incumbent) | 11,120 | 100.00% |
| Total votes | | 11,120 | 100.00% |
| Republican hold | | | |

=== District 40 ===
Primary Election Results
| Party | Candidate | Votes | % |
Republican Party Primary Results
| Republican | Chad Perkins (incumbent) | 3,285 | 55.84% |
| Republican | Dan Moran | 2,598 | 44.16% |
| Total votes | | 5,883 | 100.00% |

General Election Results
| Party | Candidate | Votes | % |
|---|---|---|---|
| Republican | Chad Perkins (incumbent) | 10,582 | 100.00% |
| Total votes | | 10,582 | 100.00% |
| Republican hold | | | |

=== District 41 ===
Primary Election Results
| Party | Candidate | Votes | % |
Republican Party Primary Results
| Republican | Doyle Justus | 2,586 | 48.76% |
| Republican | Milton Schaper | 1,616 | 30.47% |
| Republican | Phil Newbold | 616 | 11.61% |
| Republican | Jeff Nowak | 486 | 9.16% |
| Total votes | | 5,304 | 100.00% |
Democratic Party Primary Results
| Democratic | David D. Norman | 945 | 100.00% |
| Total votes | | 945 | 100.00% |
Libertarian Party Primary Results
| Libertarian | Becky Martin | 34 | 100.00% |
| Total votes | | 34 | 100.00% |

General Election Results
| Party | Candidate | Votes | % |
|---|---|---|---|
| Republican | Doyle Justus | 9,065 | 72.81% |
| Democratic | David D. Norman | 2,721 | 21.85% |
| Libertarian | Becky Martin | 665 | 5.34% |
| Total votes | | 12,451 | 100.00% |
| Republican hold | | | |

=== District 42 ===
Primary Election Results
| Party | Candidate | Votes | % |
Republican Party Primary Results
| Republican | Jeff Myers | 4,245 | 72.59% |
| Republican | M. Rene Yoesel | 970 | 16.59% |
| Republican | Joseph S. Holiway | 633 | 10.82% |
| Total votes | | 5,848 | 100.00% |

General Election Results
| Party | Candidate | Votes | % |
|---|---|---|---|
| Republican | Jeff Myers | 12,040 | 100.00% |
| Total votes | | 12,040 | 100.00% |
| Republican hold | | | |

=== District 43 ===
Primary Election Results
| Party | Candidate | Votes | % |
Republican Party Primary Results
| Republican | Kent Haden (incumbent) | 3,883 | 100.00% |
| Total votes | | 3,883 | 100.00% |

General Election Results
| Party | Candidate | Votes | % |
|---|---|---|---|
| Republican | Kent Haden (incumbent) | 10,615 | 100.00% |
| Total votes | | 10,615 | 100.00% |
| Republican hold | | | |

=== District 44 ===
Primary Election Results
| Party | Candidate | Votes | % |
Republican Party Primary Results
| Republican | Cheri Toalson Reisch (incumbent) | 3,247 | 100.00% |
| Total votes | | 3,247 | 100.00% |
Democratic Party Primary Results
| Democratic | Dave Raithel | 1,937 | 100.00% |
| Total votes | | 1,937 | 100.00% |

General Election Results
| Party | Candidate | Votes | % |
|---|---|---|---|
| Republican | Cheri Toalson Reisch (incumbent) | 9,021 | 62.58% |
| Democratic | Dave Raithel | 5,393 | 37.42% |
| Total votes | | 14,414 | 100.00% |
| Republican hold | | | |

=== District 45 ===
Primary Election Results
| Party | Candidate | Votes | % |
Democratic Party Primary Results
| Democratic | Kathy Steinhoff | 2,291 | 100.00% |
| Total votes | | 2,291 | 100.00% |

General Election Results
| Party | Candidate | Votes | % |
|---|---|---|---|
| Democratic | Kathy Steinhoff | 6,373 | 100.00% |
| Total votes | | 6,373 | 100.00% |
| Democratic hold | | | |

=== District 46 ===
Primary Election Results
| Party | Candidate | Votes | % |
Democratic Party Primary Results
| Democratic | David Tyson Smith (incumbent) | 2,621 | 100.00% |
| Total votes | | 2,621 | 100.00% |

General Election Results
| Party | Candidate | Votes | % |
|---|---|---|---|
| Democratic | David Tyson Smith (incumbent) | 7,549 | 100.00% |
| Total votes | | 7,549 | 100.00% |
| Democratic hold | | | |

=== District 47 ===
Primary Election Results
| Party | Candidate | Votes | % |
Republican Party Primary Results
| Republican | John Martin | 3,204 | 100.00% |
| Total votes | | 3,204 | 100.00% |
Democratic Party Primary Results
| Democratic | Adrian Plank | 2,325 | 50.52% |
| Democratic | Chimene Schwach | 2,277 | 49.48% |
| Total votes | | 4,602 | 100.00% |

General Election Results
| Party | Candidate | Votes | % |
|---|---|---|---|
| Democratic | Adrian Plank | 8,763 | 52.25% |
| Republican | John Martin | 8,009 | 47.75% |
| Total votes | | 16,772 | 100.00% |
| Democratic gain from Republican | | | |

=== District 48 ===
Primary Election Results
| Party | Candidate | Votes | % |
Republican Party Primary Results
| Republican | Tim Taylor (incumbent) | 5,440 | 100.00% |
| Total votes | | 5,440 | 100.00% |

General Election Results
| Party | Candidate | Votes | % |
|---|---|---|---|
| Republican | Tim Taylor (incumbent) | 11,759 | 100.00% |
| Total votes | | 11,759 | 100.00% |
| Republican hold | | | |

=== District 49 ===
Primary Election Results
| Party | Candidate | Votes | % |
Republican Party Primary Results
| Republican | Jim Schulte | 3,398 | 65.43% |
| Republican | Steven Myers | 1,422 | 27.38% |
| Republican | Shannon Graziano | 373 | 7.18% |
| Total votes | | 5,193 | 100.00% |
Democratic Party Primary Results
| Democratic | Jessica Slisz | 1,377 | 100.00% |
| Total votes | | 1,377 | 100.00% |

General Election Results
| Party | Candidate | Votes | % |
|---|---|---|---|
| Republican | Jim Schulte | 9,273 | 71.63% |
| Democratic | Jessica Slisz | 3,672 | 28.37% |
| Total votes | | 12,945 | 100.00% |
| Republican hold | | | |

=== District 50 ===
Primary Election Results
| Party | Candidate | Votes | % |
Republican Party Primary Results
| Republican | James Musgraves | 2,269 | 100.00% |
| Total votes | | 2,269 | 100.00% |
Democratic Party Primary Results
| Democratic | Douglas Mann | 2,671 | 100.00% |
| Total votes | | 2,671 | 100.00% |

General Election Results
| Party | Candidate | Votes | % |
|---|---|---|---|
| Democratic | Douglas Mann | 7,335 | 55.19% |
| Republican | James Musgraves | 5,956 | 44.81% |
| Total votes | | 13,291 | 100.00% |
| Democratic gain from Republican | | | |

=== District 51 ===
Primary Election Results
| Party | Candidate | Votes | % |
Republican Party Primary Results
| Republican | Kurtis Gregory (incumbent) | 4,225 | 100.00% |
| Total votes | | 4,225 | 100.00% |
Constitution Party Primary Results
| Constitution | Jenn E. DePee | 3 | 100.00% |
| Total votes | | 3 | 100.00% |

General Election Results
| Party | Candidate | Votes | % |
|---|---|---|---|
| Republican | Kurtis Gregory (incumbent) | 9,464 | 83.35% |
| Constitution | Jenn E. DePee | 1,890 | 16.65% |
| Total votes | | 11,354 | 100.00% |
| Republican hold | | | |

=== District 52 ===
Primary Election Results
| Party | Candidate | Votes | % |
Republican Party Primary Results
| Republican | Bradley Pollitt (incumbent) | 3,933 | 100.00% |
| Total votes | | 3,933 | 100.00% |
Democratic Party Primary Results
| Democratic | Rene Vance | 1,012 | 100.00% |
| Total votes | | 1,012 | 100.00% |

General Election Results
| Party | Candidate | Votes | % |
|---|---|---|---|
| Republican | Bradley Pollitt (incumbent) | 7,831 | 75.13% |
| Democratic | Rene Vance | 2,592 | 24.87% |
| Total votes | | 10,423 | 100.00% |
| Republican hold | | | |

=== District 53 ===
Primary Election Results
| Party | Candidate | Votes | % |
Republican Party Primary Results
| Republican | Terry Thompson (incumbent) | 3,861 | 100.00% |
| Total votes | | 3,861 | 100.00% |

General Election Results
| Party | Candidate | Votes | % |
|---|---|---|---|
| Republican | Terry Thompson (incumbent) | 10,934 | 100.00% |
| Total votes | | 10,934 | 100.00% |
| Republican hold | | | |

=== District 54 ===
Primary Election Results
| Party | Candidate | Votes | % |
Republican Party Primary Results
| Republican | Dan Houx (incumbent) | 4,175 | 100.00% |
| Total votes | | 4,175 | 100.00% |

General Election Results
| Party | Candidate | Votes | % |
|---|---|---|---|
| Republican | Dan Houx (incumbent) | 9,475 | 100.00% |
| Total votes | | 9,475 | 100.00% |
| Republican hold | | | |

=== District 55 ===
Primary Election Results
| Party | Candidate | Votes | % |
Republican Party Primary Results
| Republican | Mike Haffner (incumbent) | 5,229 | 100.00% |
| Total votes | | 5,229 | 100.00% |

General Election Results
| Party | Candidate | Votes | % |
|---|---|---|---|
| Republican | Mike Haffner (incumbent) | 12,095 | 100.00% |
| Total votes | | 12,095 | 100.00% |
| Republican hold | | | |

=== District 56 ===
Primary Election Results
| Party | Candidate | Votes | % |
Republican Party Primary Results
| Republican | Michael Davis (incumbent) | 3,292 | 100.00% |
| Total votes | | 3,292 | 100.00% |
Democratic Party Primary Results
| Democratic | Patty Johnson | 1,946 | 100.00% |
| Total votes | | 1,946 | 100.00% |

General Election Results
| Party | Candidate | Votes | % |
|---|---|---|---|
| Republican | Michael Davis (incumbent) | 6,774 | 57.27% |
| Democratic | Patty Johnson | 5,054 | 42.73% |
| Total votes | | 11,828 | 100.00% |
| Republican hold | | | |

=== District 57 ===
Primary Election Results
| Party | Candidate | Votes | % |
Republican Party Primary Results
| Republican | Rodger L. Reedy (incumbent) | 3,926 | 68.60% |
| Republican | James Mahlon White | 1,797 | 31.40% |
| Total votes | | 5,723 | 100.00% |
Libertarian Party Primary Results
| Libertarian | William Truman (Bill) Wayne | 20 | 100.00% |
| Total votes | | 20 | 100.00% |

General Election Results
| Party | Candidate | Votes | % |
|---|---|---|---|
| Republican | Rodger L. Reedy (incumbent) | 10,723 | 83.60% |
| Libertarian | William Truman (Bill) Wayne | 2,103 | 16.40% |
| Total votes | | 12,826 | 100.00% |
| Republican hold | | | |

=== District 58 ===
Primary Election Results
| Party | Candidate | Votes | % |
Republican Party Primary Results
| Republican | Willard Haley (incumbent) | 4,223 | 72.08% |
| Republican | Casey Pemberton | 1,636 | 27.92% |
| Total votes | | 5,859 | 100.00% |

General Election Results
| Party | Candidate | Votes | % |
|---|---|---|---|
| Republican | Willard Haley (incumbent) | 10,525 | 100.00% |
| Total votes | | 10,525 | 100.00% |
| Republican hold | | | |

=== District 59 ===
Primary Election Results
| Party | Candidate | Votes | % |
Republican Party Primary Results
| Republican | Rudy Veit (incumbent) | 4,905 | 63.78% |
| Republican | George M. Bacon | 2,786 | 36.22% |
| Total votes | | 7,691 | 100.00% |

General Election Results
| Party | Candidate | Votes | % |
|---|---|---|---|
| Republican | Rudy Veit (incumbent) | 13,613 | 100.00% |
| Total votes | | 13,613 | 100.00% |
| Republican hold | | | |

=== District 60 ===
Primary Election Results
| Party | Candidate | Votes | % |
Republican Party Primary Results
| Republican | Dave Griffith (incumbent) | 4,150 | 100.00% |
| Total votes | | 4,150 | 100.00% |
Democratic Party Primary Results
| Democratic | J. Don Salcedo | 1,615 | 100.00% |
| Total votes | | 1,615 | 100.00% |

General Election Results
| Party | Candidate | Votes | % |
|---|---|---|---|
| Republican | Dave Griffith (incumbent) | 7,577 | 62.20% |
| Democratic | J. Don Salcedo | 4,605 | 37.80% |
| Total votes | | 12,182 | 100.00% |
| Republican hold | | | |

=== District 61 ===
Primary Election Results
| Party | Candidate | Votes | % |
Republican Party Primary Results
| Republican | Bruce Sassmann (incumbent) | 6,288 | 100.00% |
| Total votes | | 6,288 | 100.00% |

General Election Results
| Party | Candidate | Votes | % |
|---|---|---|---|
| Republican | Bruce Sassmann (incumbent) | 12,874 | 100.00% |
| Total votes | | 12,874 | 100.00% |
| Republican hold | | | |

=== District 62 ===
Primary Election Results
| Party | Candidate | Votes | % |
Republican Party Primary Results
| Republican | Sherri Gallick | 2,658 | 39.17% |
| Republican | Jessica Jane Levsen | 2,339 | 34.47% |
| Republican | Bing Schimmelpfenning | 1,788 | 26.35% |
| Total votes | | 6,785 | 100.00% |
Democratic Party Primary Results
| Democratic | Jim Hogan | 1,556 | 100.00% |
| Total votes | | 1,556 | 100.00% |

General Election Results
| Party | Candidate | Votes | % |
|---|---|---|---|
| Republican | Sherri Gallick | 11,040 | 73.11% |
| Democratic | Jim Hogan | 4,061 | 26.89% |
| Total votes | | 15,101 | 100.00% |
| Republican hold | | | |

=== District 63 ===
Primary Election Results
| Party | Candidate | Votes | % |
Republican Party Primary Results
| Republican | Tricia Byrnes | 2,315 | 67.85% |
| Republican | Carla Klaskin | 1,097 | 32.15% |
| Total votes | | 3,412 | 100.00% |
Democratic Party Primary Results
| Democratic | Jenna Roberson | 1,442 | 100.00% |
| Total votes | | 1,442 | 100.00% |

General Election Results
| Party | Candidate | Votes | % |
|---|---|---|---|
| Republican | Tricia Byrnes | 7,616 | 66.21% |
| Democratic | Jenna Roberson | 3,887 | 33.79% |
| Total votes | | 11,503 | 100.00% |
| Republican hold | | | |

=== District 64 ===
Primary Election Results
| Party | Candidate | Votes | % |
Republican Party Primary Results
| Republican | Tony Lovasco (incumbent) | 1,621 | 36.25% |
| Republican | Deanna Self | 1,555 | 34.77% |
| Republican | Mike Swaringim | 1,296 | 28.98% |
| Total votes | | 4,472 | 100.00% |

General Election Results
| Party | Candidate | Votes | % |
|---|---|---|---|
| Republican | Tony Lovasco (incumbent) | 10,252 | 100.00% |
| Total votes | | 10,252 | 100.00% |
| Republican hold | | | |

=== District 65 ===
Primary Election Results
| Party | Candidate | Votes | % |
Republican Party Primary Results
| Republican | Wendy Hausman | 3,241 | 100.00% |
| Total votes | | 3,241 | 100.00% |
Democratic Party Primary Results
| Democratic | Eric Nowicki | 1,928 | 100.00% |
| Total votes | | 1,928 | 100.00% |

General Election Results
| Party | Candidate | Votes | % |
|---|---|---|---|
| Republican | Wendy Hausman | 8,281 | 60.34% |
| Democratic | Eric Nowicki | 5,442 | 39.66% |
| Total votes | | 13,723 | 100.00% |
| Republican win (new seat) | | | |

=== District 66 ===
Primary Election Results
| Party | Candidate | Votes | % |
Democratic Party Primary Results
| Democratic | Marlene Terry (incumbent) | 2,463 | 100.00% |
| Total votes | | 2,463 | 100.00% |

General Election Results
| Party | Candidate | Votes | % |
|---|---|---|---|
| Democratic | Marlene Terry (incumbent) | 6,033 | 100.00% |
| Total votes | | 6,033 | 100.00% |
| Democratic hold | | | |

=== District 67 ===
Primary Election Results
| Party | Candidate | Votes | % |
Democratic Party Primary Results
| Democratic | Chantelle Nickson-Clark | 3,980 | 65.71% |
| Democratic | Neil Smith (incumbent) | 2,077 | 34.29% |
| Total votes | | 6,057 | 100.00% |

General Election Results
| Party | Candidate | Votes | % |
|---|---|---|---|
| Democratic | Chantelle Nickson-Clark | 11,514 | 100.00% |
| Total votes | | 11,514 | 100.00% |
| Democratic hold | | | |

=== District 68 ===
Primary Election Results
| Party | Candidate | Votes | % |
Democratic Party Primary Results
| Democratic | Jay Mosley (incumbent) | 2,336 | 60.57% |
| Democratic | Pamela Paul | 990 | 25.67% |
| Democratic | Don Houston | 531 | 13.77% |
| Total votes | | 3,857 | 100.00% |

General Election Results
| Party | Candidate | Votes | % |
|---|---|---|---|
| Democratic | Jay Mosley (incumbent) | 8,128 | 100.00% |
| Total votes | | 8,128 | 100.00% |
| Democratic hold | | | |

=== District 69 ===
Primary Election Results
| Party | Candidate | Votes | % |
Republican Party Primary Results
| Republican | Adam Schnelting (incumbent) | 3,872 | 100.00% |
| Total votes | | 3,872 | 100.00% |
Democratic Party Primary Results
| Democratic | Jessica DeVoto | 2,208 | 100.00% |
| Total votes | | 2,208 | 100.00% |

General Election Results
| Party | Candidate | Votes | % |
|---|---|---|---|
| Republican | Adam Schnelting (incumbent) | 9,376 | 59.72% |
| Democratic | Jessica DeVoto | 6,325 | 40.28% |
| Total votes | | 15,701 | 100.00% |
| Republican gain from Democratic | | | |

=== District 70 ===
Primary Election Results
| Party | Candidate | Votes | % |
Democratic Party Primary Results
| Democratic | Gretchen Bangert (incumbent) | 1,979 | 62.08% |
| Democratic | Stephanie Boykin | 1,209 | 37.92% |
| Total votes | | 3,188 | 100.00% |
Libertarian Party Primary Results
| Libertarian | Dustin Coffell | 24 | 100.00% |
| Total votes | | 24 | 100.00% |

General Election Results
| Party | Candidate | Votes | % |
|---|---|---|---|
| Democratic | Gretchen Bangert (incumbent) | 7,225 | 74.42% |
| Libertarian | Dustin Coffell | 2,484 | 25.58% |
| Total votes | | 9,709 | 100.00% |
| Democratic hold | | | |

=== District 71 ===
Primary Election Results
| Party | Candidate | Votes | % |
Democratic Party Primary Results
| Democratic | LaDonna Appelbaum (incumbent) | 4,490 | 100.00% |
| Total votes | | 4,490 | 100.00% |
Republican Party Primary Results
| Republican | Karan Pujji | 1,931 | 100.00% |
| Total votes | | 1,931 | 100.00% |

General Election Results
| Party | Candidate | Votes | % |
|---|---|---|---|
| Democratic | LaDonna Appelbaum (incumbent) | 10,199 | 64.00% |
| Republican | Karan Pujji | 5,736 | 36.00% |
| Total votes | | 15,935 | 100.00% |
| Democratic hold | | | |

=== District 72 ===
Primary Election Results
| Party | Candidate | Votes | % |
Democratic Party Primary Results
| Democratic | Doug Clemens (incumbent) | 2,575 | 100.00% |
| Total votes | | 2,575 | 100.00% |

General Election Results
| Party | Candidate | Votes | % |
|---|---|---|---|
| Democratic | Doug Clemens (incumbent) | 7,114 | 100.00% |
| Total votes | | 7,114 | 100.00% |
| Democratic hold | | | |

=== District 73 ===
Primary Election Results
| Party | Candidate | Votes | % |
Democratic Party Primary Results
| Democratic | Raychel Proudie (incumbent) | 2,005 | 62.02% |
| Democratic | Mike Person (incumbent) | 1,228 | 37.98% |
| Total votes | | 3,233 | 100.00% |

General Election Results
| Party | Candidate | Votes | % |
|---|---|---|---|
| Democratic | Raychel Proudie (incumbent) | 6,741 | 100.00% |
| Total votes | | 6,741 | 100.00% |
| Democratic hold | | | |

=== District 74 ===
Primary Election Results
| Party | Candidate | Votes | % |
Democratic Party Primary Results
| Democratic | Kevin Windham Jr. (incumbent) | 3,221 | 100.00% |
| Total votes | | 3,221 | 100.00% |

General Election Results
| Party | Candidate | Votes | % |
|---|---|---|---|
| Democratic | Kevin Windham Jr. (incumbent) | 7,451 | 100.00% |
| Total votes | | 7,451 | 100.00% |
| Democratic hold | | | |

=== District 75 ===
Primary Election Results
| Party | Candidate | Votes | % |
Democratic Party Primary Results
| Democratic | Alan Gray (incumbent) | 2,196 | 58.00% |
| Democratic | Sylvester Taylor II | 1,590 | 42.00% |
| Total votes | | 3,786 | 100.00% |

General Election Results
| Party | Candidate | Votes | % |
|---|---|---|---|
| Democratic | Alan Gray (incumbent) | 8,295 | 100.00% |
| Total votes | | 8,295 | 100.00% |
| Democratic hold | | | |

=== District 76 ===
Primary Election Results
| Party | Candidate | Votes | % |
Democratic Party Primary Results
| Democratic | Marlon Anderson (incumbent) | 3,606 | 100.00% |
| Total votes | | 3,606 | 100.00% |

General Election Results
| Party | Candidate | Votes | % |
|---|---|---|---|
| Democratic | Marlon Anderson (incumbent) | 8,049 | 100.00% |
| Total votes | | 8,049 | 100.00% |
| Democratic hold | | | |

=== District 77 ===
Primary Election Results
| Party | Candidate | Votes | % |
Democratic Party Primary Results
| Democratic | Kimberly-Ann Collins (incumbent) | 4,305 | 100.00% |
| Total votes | | 4,305 | 100.00% |

General Election Results
| Party | Candidate | Votes | % |
|---|---|---|---|
| Democratic | Kimberly-Ann Collins (incumbent) | 9,218 | 100.00% |
| Total votes | | 9,218 | 100.00% |
| Democratic hold | | | |

=== District 78 ===
Primary Election Results
| Party | Candidate | Votes | % |
Democratic Party Primary Results
| Democratic | Rasheen Aldridge Jr. (incumbent) | 3,073 | 100.00% |
| Total votes | | 3,073 | 100.00% |

General Election Results
| Party | Candidate | Votes | % |
|---|---|---|---|
| Democratic | Rasheen Aldridge Jr. (incumbent) | 6,869 | 100.00% |
| Total votes | | 6,869 | 100.00% |
| Democratic hold | | | |

=== District 79 ===
Primary Election Results
| Party | Candidate | Votes | % |
Democratic Party Primary Results
| Democratic | LaKeySha Bosley (incumbent) | 3,836 | 100.00% |
| Total votes | | 3,836 | 100.00% |

General Election Results
| Party | Candidate | Votes | % |
|---|---|---|---|
| Democratic | LaKeySha Bosley (incumbent) | 7,844 | 100.00% |
| Total votes | | 7,844 | 100.00% |
| Democratic hold | | | |

=== District 80 ===
Primary Election Results
| Party | Candidate | Votes | % |
Democratic Party Primary Results
| Democratic | Peter J. Merideth (incumbent) | 4,524 | 100.00% |
| Total votes | | 4,524 | 100.00% |
Republican Party Primary Results
| Republican | Kirk Hilzinger | 494 | 100.00% |
| Total votes | | 494 | 100.00% |
Libertarian Party Primary Results
| Libertarian | Rebecca Sharpe Lombard | 7 | 100.00% |
| Total votes | | 7 | 100.00% |

General Election Results
| Party | Candidate | Votes | % |
|---|---|---|---|
| Democratic | Peter J. Merideth (incumbent) | 8,859 | 82.69% |
| Republican | Kirk Hilzinger | 1,525 | 14.24% |
| Libertarian | Rebecca Sharpe Lombard | 329 | 3.07% |
| Total votes | | 10,713 | 100.00% |
| Democratic hold | | | |

=== District 81 ===
Primary Election Results
| Party | Candidate | Votes | % |
Democratic Party Primary Results
| Democratic | Steve Butz (incumbent) | 2,630 | 60.20% |
| Democratic | Bill Stephens | 1,739 | 39.80% |
| Total votes | | 4,369 | 100.00% |
Republican Party Primary Results
| Republican | Jake Koehr | 783 | 100.00% |
| Total votes | | 783 | 100.00% |

General Election Results
| Party | Candidate | Votes | % |
|---|---|---|---|
| Democratic | Steve Butz (incumbent) | 7,592 | 77.67% |
| Republican | Jake Koehr | 2,183 | 22.33% |
| Total votes | | 9,775 | 100.00% |
| Democratic hold | | | |

=== District 82 ===
Primary Election Results
| Party | Candidate | Votes | % |
Democratic Party Primary Results
| Democratic | Donna M.C. Baringer (incumbent) | 6,218 | 100.00% |
| Total votes | | 6,218 | 100.00% |
Republican Party Primary Results
| Republican | Robert J. Crump | 1,590 | 100.00% |
| Total votes | | 1,590 | 100.00% |

General Election Results
| Party | Candidate | Votes | % |
|---|---|---|---|
| Democratic | Donna M.C. Baringer (incumbent) | 12,964 | 74.98% |
| Republican | Robert J. Crump | 4,326 | 25.02% |
| Total votes | | 17,290 | 100.00% |
| Democratic hold | | | |

=== District 83 ===
Primary Election Results
| Party | Candidate | Votes | % |
Democratic Party Primary Results
| Democratic | Sarah Unsicker (incumbent) | 4,581 | 100.00% |
| Total votes | | 4,581 | 100.00% |
Libertarian Party Primary Results
| Libertarian | Andrew Bolin | 20 | 100.00% |
| Total votes | | 20 | 100.00% |

General Election Results
| Party | Candidate | Votes | % |
|---|---|---|---|
| Democratic | Sarah Unsicker (incumbent) | 11,078 | 75.90% |
| Libertarian | Andrew Bolin | 3,518 | 24.10% |
| Total votes | | 14,596 | 100.00% |
| Democratic hold | | | |

=== District 84 ===
Primary Election Results
| Party | Candidate | Votes | % |
Democratic Party Primary Results
| Democratic | Del Taylor | 2,627 | 57.37% |
| Democratic | Wiley (Chip) Price (incumbent) | 1,952 | 42.63% |
| Total votes | | 4,579 | 100.00% |

General Election Results
| Party | Candidate | Votes | % |
|---|---|---|---|
| Democratic | Del Taylor | 8,991 | 100.00% |
| Total votes | | 8,991 | 100.00% |
| Democratic hold | | | |

=== District 85 ===
Primary Election Results
| Party | Candidate | Votes | % |
Democratic Party Primary Results
| Democratic | Yolonda Fountain Henderson | 1,885 | 53.08% |
| Democratic | Yonnee Fortson | 1,190 | 33.51% |
| Democratic | Donovan Meeks | 476 | 13.40% |
| Total votes | | 3,551 | 100.00% |

General Election Results
| Party | Candidate | Votes | % |
|---|---|---|---|
| Democratic | Yolonda Fountain Henderson | 7,026 | 100.00% |
| Total votes | | 7,026 | 100.00% |
| Democratic hold | | | |

=== District 86 ===
Primary Election Results
| Party | Candidate | Votes | % |
Democratic Party Primary Results
| Democratic | Joe Adams (incumbent) | 5,418 | 100.00% |
| Total votes | | 5,418 | 100.00% |

General Election Results
| Party | Candidate | Votes | % |
|---|---|---|---|
| Democratic | Joe Adams (incumbent) | 11,582 | 100.00% |
| Total votes | | 11,582 | 100.00% |
| Democratic hold | | | |

=== District 87 ===
Primary Election Results
| Party | Candidate | Votes | % |
Democratic Party Primary Results
| Democratic | Paula Brown (incumbent) | 3,018 | 100.00% |
| Total votes | | 3,018 | 100.00% |

General Election Results
| Party | Candidate | Votes | % |
|---|---|---|---|
| Democratic | Paula Brown (incumbent) | 8,707 | 100.00% |
| Total votes | | 8,707 | 100.00% |
| Democratic hold | | | |

=== District 88 ===
Primary Election Results
| Party | Candidate | Votes | % |
Democratic Party Primary Results
| Democratic | Kyle Luzynski | 2,286 | 100.00% |
| Total votes | | 2,286 | 100.00% |
Republican Party Primary Results
| Republican | Holly Jones | 2,589 | 64.44% |
| Republican | Nancy R. Stevens | 1,429 | 35.56% |
| Total votes | | 4,018 | 100.00% |

General Election Results
| Party | Candidate | Votes | % |
|---|---|---|---|
| Republican | Holly Jones | 9,723 | 61.24% |
| Democratic | Kyle Luzynski | 6,154 | 38.76% |
| Total votes | | 15,877 | 100.00% |
| Republican gain from Democratic | | | |

=== District 89 ===
Primary Election Results
| Party | Candidate | Votes | % |
Republican Party Primary Results
| Republican | Dean Plocher (incumbent) | 3,766 | 100.00% |
| Total votes | | 3,766 | 100.00% |
Democratic Party Primary Results
| Democratic | Luke Barber | 3,062 | 100.00% |
| Total votes | | 3,062 | 100.00% |

General Election Results
| Party | Candidate | Votes | % |
|---|---|---|---|
| Republican | Dean Plocher (incumbent) | 10,559 | 60.13% |
| Democratic | Luke Barber | 7,002 | 39.87% |
| Total votes | | 17,561 | 100.00% |
| Republican hold | | | |

=== District 90 ===
Primary Election Results
| Party | Candidate | Votes | % |
Democratic Party Primary Results
| Democratic | Barbara Phifer (incumbent) | 4,690 | 100.00% |
| Total votes | | 4,690 | 100.00% |
Republican Party Primary Results
| Republican | Gary Albert Bokermann, Jr. | 2,447 | 100.00% |
| Total votes | | 2,447 | 100.00% |

General Election Results
| Party | Candidate | Votes | % |
|---|---|---|---|
| Democratic | Barbara Phifer (incumbent) | 11,355 | 62.56% |
| Republican | Gary Albert Bokermann, Jr. | 6,795 | 37.44% |
| Total votes | | 18,150 | 100.00% |
| Democratic hold | | | |

=== District 91 ===
Primary Election Results
| Party | Candidate | Votes | % |
Democratic Party Primary Results
| Democratic | Jo Doll (incumbent) | 6,220 | 100.00% |
| Total votes | | 6,220 | 100.00% |

General Election Results
| Party | Candidate | Votes | % |
|---|---|---|---|
| Democratic | Jo Doll (incumbent) | 13,239 | 100.00% |
| Total votes | | 13,239 | 100.00% |
| Democratic hold | | | |

=== District 92 ===
Primary Election Results
| Party | Candidate | Votes | % |
Democratic Party Primary Results
| Democratic | Michael Burton (incumbent) | 1,731 | 51.67% |
| Democratic | Kenny Edgar | 1,619 | 48.33% |
| Total votes | | 3,350 | 100.00% |
Republican Party Primary Results
| Republican | Bob Mahacek | 2,479 | 100.00% |
| Total votes | | 2,479 | 100.00% |

General Election Results
| Party | Candidate | Votes | % |
|---|---|---|---|
| Democratic | Michael Burton (incumbent) | 7,235 | 51.17% |
| Republican | Bob Mahacek | 6,903 | 48.83% |
| Total votes | | 14,138 | 100.00% |
| Democratic hold | | | |

=== District 93 ===
Primary Election Results
| Party | Candidate | Votes | % |
Democratic Party Primary Results
| Democratic | Bridget Walsh Moore (incumbent) | 2,058 | 100.00% |
| Total votes | | 2,058 | 100.00% |
Republican Party Primary Results
| Republican | Kenneth Abram | 1,537 | 100.00% |
| Total votes | | 1,537 | 100.00% |

General Election Results
| Party | Candidate | Votes | % |
|---|---|---|---|
| Democratic | Bridget Walsh Moore (incumbent) | 5,129 | 54.67% |
| Republican | Kenneth Abram | 4,253 | 45.33% |
| Total votes | | 9,382 | 100.00% |
| Democratic hold | | | |

=== District 94 ===
Primary Election Results
| Party | Candidate | Votes | % |
Republican Party Primary Results
| Republican | Jim Murphy (incumbent) | 3,025 | 100.00% |
| Total votes | | 3,025 | 100.00% |
Democratic Party Primary Results
| Democratic | Kyle W. Kerns | 2,602 | 100.00% |
| Total votes | | 2,602 | 100.00% |

General Election Results
| Party | Candidate | Votes | % |
|---|---|---|---|
| Republican | Jim Murphy (incumbent) | 7,892 | 57.11% |
| Democratic | Kyle W. Kerns | 5,926 | 42.89% |
| Total votes | | 13,818 | 100.00% |
| Republican hold | | | |

=== District 95 ===
Primary Election Results
| Party | Candidate | Votes | % |
Republican Party Primary Results
| Republican | Michael A. O'Donnell (incumbent) | 3,689 | 100.00% |
| Total votes | | 3,689 | 100.00% |
Democratic Party Primary Results
| Democratic | Ann Zimpfer | 2,927 | 100.00% |
| Total votes | | 2,927 | 100.00% |

General Election Results
| Party | Candidate | Votes | % |
|---|---|---|---|
| Republican | Michael A. O'Donnell (incumbent) | 9,809 | 58.66% |
| Democratic | Ann Zimpfer | 6,914 | 41.34% |
| Total votes | | 16,723 | 100.00% |
| Republican hold | | | |

=== District 96 ===
Primary Election Results
| Party | Candidate | Votes | % |
Republican Party Primary Results
| Republican | Brad Christ | 3,341 | 77.23% |
| Republican | Mike Tsichlis | 985 | 22.77% |
| Total votes | | 4,326 | 100.00% |
Democratic Party Primary Results
| Democratic | Leslie Derrington | 3,747 | 100.00% |
| Total votes | | 3,747 | 100.00% |

General Election Results
| Party | Candidate | Votes | % |
|---|---|---|---|
| Republican | Brad Christ | 9,596 | 54.45% |
| Democratic | Leslie Derrington | 8,026 | 45.55% |
| Total votes | | 17,622 | 100.00% |
| Republican hold | | | |

=== District 97 ===
Primary Election Results
| Party | Candidate | Votes | % |
Republican Party Primary Results
| Republican | David Casteel | 2,558 | 68.09% |
| Republican | Ryan Jones | 1,199 | 31.91% |
| Total votes | | 3,757 | 100.00% |

General Election Results
| Party | Candidate | Votes | % |
|---|---|---|---|
| Republican | David Casteel | 9,313 | 100.00% |
| Total votes | | 9,313 | 100.00% |
| Republican hold | | | |

=== District 98 ===
Primary Election Results
| Party | Candidate | Votes | % |
Republican Party Primary Results
| Republican | Ryan Higgins | 2,911 | 100.00% |
| Total votes | | 2,911 | 100.00% |
Democratic Party Primary Results
| Democratic | Deb Lavender | 3,398 | 100.00% |
| Total votes | | 3,398 | 100.00% |

General Election Results
| Party | Candidate | Votes | % |
|---|---|---|---|
| Democratic | Deb Lavender | 8,213 | 51.51% |
| Republican | Ryan Higgins | 7,733 | 48.49% |
| Total votes | | 15,946 | 100.00% |
| Democratic gain from Republican | | | |

=== District 99 ===
Primary Election Results
| Party | Candidate | Votes | % |
Democratic Party Primary Results
| Democratic | Ian Mackey (incumbent) | 3,831 | 81.96% |
| Democratic | Boris Abadzhyan | 843 | 18.04% |
| Total votes | | 4,674 | 100.00% |
Republican Party Primary Results
| Republican | LaVanna M. Wrobley | 1,511 | 100.00% |
| Total votes | | 1,511 | 100.00% |

General Election Results
| Party | Candidate | Votes | % |
|---|---|---|---|
| Democratic | Ian Mackey (incumbent) | 9,768 | 65.46% |
| Republican | LaVanna Wrobley | 5,154 | 34.54% |
| Total votes | | 14,922 | 100.00% |
| Democratic hold | | | |

=== District 100 ===
Primary Election Results
| Party | Candidate | Votes | % |
Republican Party Primary Results
| Republican | Philip Oehlerking | 2,354 | 68.63% |
| Republican | Brant Harber | 1,076 | 31.37% |
| Total votes | | 3,430 | 100.00% |
Democratic Party Primary Results
| Democratic | Colin Lovett | 2,934 | 100.00% |
| Total votes | | 2,934 | 100.00% |

General Election Results
| Party | Candidate | Votes | % |
|---|---|---|---|
| Republican | Philip Oehlerking | 8,315 | 50.55% |
| Democratic | Colin Lovett | 8,134 | 49.45% |
| Total votes | | 16,449 | 100.00% |
| Republican hold | | | |

=== District 101 ===
Primary Election Results
| Party | Candidate | Votes | % |
Republican Party Primary Results
| Republican | Ben Keathley | 2,478 | 54.82% |
| Republican | John Brunner | 2,042 | 45.18% |
| Total votes | | 4,520 | 100.00% |
Democratic Party Primary Results
| Democratic | Melissa Greenstein | 3,383 | 100.00% |
| Total votes | | 3,383 | 100.00% |
Libertarian Party Primary Results
| Libertarian | Jeff Coleman | 17 | 100.00% |
| Total votes | | 17 | 100.00% |

General Election Results
| Party | Candidate | Votes | % |
|---|---|---|---|
| Republican | Ben Keathley | 9,322 | 52.64% |
| Democratic | Melissa Greenstein | 8,184 | 46.21% |
| Libertarian | Jeff Coleman | 204 | 1.15% |
| Total votes | | 17,710 | 100.00% |
| Republican hold | | | |

=== District 102 ===
Primary Election Results
| Party | Candidate | Votes | % |
Republican Party Primary Results
| Republican | Richard W. West (incumbent) | 4,226 | 100.00% |
| Total votes | | 4,226 | 100.00% |

General Election Results
| Party | Candidate | Votes | % |
|---|---|---|---|
| Republican | Richard W. West (incumbent) | 12,034 | 100.00% |
| Total votes | | 12,034 | 100.00% |
| Republican hold | | | |

=== District 103 ===
Primary Election Results
| Party | Candidate | Votes | % |
Republican Party Primary Results
| Republican | Dave Hinman | 1,797 | 54.32% |
| Republican | Duell Wayne Lauderdale | 1,511 | 45.68% |
| Total votes | | 3,308 | 100.00% |

General Election Results
| Party | Candidate | Votes | % |
|---|---|---|---|
| Republican | Dave Hinman | 9,056 | 100.00% |
| Total votes | | 9,056 | 100.00% |
| Republican hold | | | |

=== District 104 ===
Primary Election Results
| Party | Candidate | Votes | % |
Republican Party Primary Results
| Republican | Phil Christofanelli (incumbent) | 3,196 | 100.00% |
| Total votes | | 3,196 | 100.00% |
Democratic Party Primary Results
| Democratic | Gregory A. Upchurch | 2,388 | 100.00% |
| Total votes | | 2,388 | 100.00% |

General Election Results
| Party | Candidate | Votes | % |
|---|---|---|---|
| Republican | Phil Christofanelli (incumbent) | 7,978 | 55.67% |
| Democratic | Gregory A. Upchurch | 6,353 | 44.33% |
| Total votes | | 14,331 | 100.00% |
| Republican hold | | | |

=== District 105 ===
Primary Election Results
| Party | Candidate | Votes | % |
Republican Party Primary Results
| Republican | Adam Schwadron (incumbent) | 2,303 | 100.00% |
| Total votes | | 2,303 | 100.00% |
Democratic Party Primary Results
| Democratic | Cindy Berne | 1,871 | 100.00% |
| Total votes | | 1,871 | 100.00% |
Libertarian Party Primary Results
| Libertarian | Michael Carver | 25 | 100.00% |
| Total votes | | 25 | 100.00% |

General Election Results
| Party | Candidate | Votes | % |
|---|---|---|---|
| Republican | Adam Schwadron (incumbent) | 5,404 | 49.35% |
| Democratic | Cindy Berne | 5,305 | 48.44% |
| Libertarian | Michael Carver | 242 | 2.21% |
| Total votes | | 10,951 | 100.00% |
| Republican hold | | | |

=== District 106 ===
Primary Election Results
| Party | Candidate | Votes | % |
Republican Party Primary Results
| Republican | Travis Wilson | 1,787 | 44.94% |
| Republican | Linda J. Luera-Sanchez | 1,067 | 26.84% |
| Republican | Buddy Hardin | 953 | 23.97% |
| Republican | Ali Graeff | 169 | 4.25% |
| Total votes | | 3,976 | 100.00% |
Democratic Party Primary Results
| Democratic | Ron Odenthal | 2,501 | 100.00% |
| Total votes | | 2,501 | 100.00% |

General Election Results
| Party | Candidate | Votes | % |
|---|---|---|---|
| Republican | Travis Wilson | 7,621 | 54.51% |
| Democratic | Ron Odenthal | 6,359 | 45.49% |
| Total votes | | 13,980 | 100.00% |
| Republican hold | | | |

=== District 107 ===
Primary Election Results
| Party | Candidate | Votes | % |
Republican Party Primary Results
| Republican | Mark A. Matthiesen | 3,042 | 100.00% |
| Total votes | | 3,042 | 100.00% |
Democratic Party Primary Results
| Democratic | Tracy Grundy | 1,845 | 100.00% |
| Total votes | | 1,845 | 100.00% |

General Election Results
| Party | Candidate | Votes | % |
|---|---|---|---|
| Republican | Mark A. Matthiesen | 8,151 | 59.94% |
| Democratic | Tracy Grundy | 5,447 | 40.06% |
| Total votes | | 13,598 | 100.00% |
| Republican hold | | | |

=== District 108 ===
Primary Election Results
| Party | Candidate | Votes | % |
Republican Party Primary Results
| Republican | Justin Hicks | 2,171 | 52.96% |
| Republican | Matthew Griese | 1,016 | 24.79% |
| Republican | Karen Vennard | 912 | 22.25% |
| Total votes | | 4,099 | 100.00% |
Democratic Party Primary Results
| Democratic | Susan Shumway | 1,810 | 100.00% |
| Total votes | | 1,810 | 100.00% |

General Election Results
| Party | Candidate | Votes | % |
|---|---|---|---|
| Republican | Justin Hicks | 8,895 | 63.89% |
| Democratic | Susan Shumway | 5,028 | 36.11% |
| Total votes | | 13,923 | 100.00% |
| Republican win (new seat) | | | |

=== District 109 ===
Primary Election Results
| Party | Candidate | Votes | % |
Republican Party Primary Results
| Republican | Kyle Marquart | 3,333 | 48.55% |
| Republican | John Simmons (incumbent) | 3,165 | 46.10% |
| Republican | Anthony Campbell | 367 | 5.35% |
| Total votes | | 6,865 | 100.00% |

General Election Results
| Party | Candidate | Votes | % |
|---|---|---|---|
| Republican | Kyle Marquart | 12,967 | 100.00% |
| Total votes | | 12,967 | 100.00% |
| Republican hold | | | |

=== District 110 ===
Primary Election Results
| Party | Candidate | Votes | % |
Republican Party Primary Results
| Republican | Bruce DeGroot (incumbent) | 3,957 | 100.00% |
| Total votes | | 3,957 | 100.00% |
Democratic Party Primary Results
| Democratic | Josh Thackston | 2,327 | 100.00% |
| Total votes | | 2,327 | 100.00% |

General Election Results
| Party | Candidate | Votes | % |
|---|---|---|---|
| Republican | Justin Sparks | 11,302 | 64.20% |
| Democratic | Josh Thackston | 6,303 | 35.80% |
| Total votes | | 17,605 | 100.00% |
| Republican hold | | | |

=== District 111 ===
Primary Election Results
| Party | Candidate | Votes | % |
Republican Party Primary Results
| Republican | Gary Bonacker | 2,811 | 52.07% |
| Republican | Cecelie Williams | 1,388 | 25.71% |
| Republican | Christopher Ray | 698 | 12.93% |
| Republican | Robert (Ragz) Falcone | 501 | 9.28% |
| Total votes | | 5,398 | 100.00% |

General Election Results
| Party | Candidate | Votes | % |
|---|---|---|---|
| Republican | Gary Bonacker | 11,065 | 100.00% |
| Total votes | | 11,065 | 100.00% |
| Republican hold | | | |

=== District 112 ===
Primary Election Results
| Party | Candidate | Votes | % |
Republican Party Primary Results
| Republican | Renee Reuter | 3,613 | 100.00% |
| Total votes | | 3,613 | 100.00% |

General Election Results
| Party | Candidate | Votes | % |
|---|---|---|---|
| Republican | Renee Reuter | 10,629 | 100.00% |
| Total votes | | 10,629 | 100.00% |
| Republican hold | | | |

=== District 113 ===
Primary Election Results
| Party | Candidate | Votes | % |
Republican Party Primary Results
| Republican | Phil Amato | 2,291 | 53.12% |
| Republican | Terry Burgess | 2,022 | 46.88% |
| Total votes | | 4,313 | 100.00% |

General Election Results
| Party | Candidate | Votes | % |
|---|---|---|---|
| Republican | Phil Amato | 10,168 | 100.00% |
| Total votes | | 10,168 | 100.00% |
| Republican hold | | | |

=== District 114 ===
Primary Election Results
| Party | Candidate | Votes | % |
Republican Party Primary Results
| Republican | Ken Waller | 2,606 | 55.78% |
| Republican | Ann Moloney | 2,066 | 44.22% |
| Total votes | | 4,672 | 100.00% |
Democratic Party Primary Results
| Democratic | Jessie Shepherd | 1,533 | 100.00% |
| Total votes | | 1,533 | 100.00% |

General Election Results
| Party | Candidate | Votes | % |
|---|---|---|---|
| Republican | Ken Waller | 8,545 | 67.38% |
| Democratic | Jessie Shepherd | 4,136 | 32.62% |
| Total votes | | 12,681 | 100.00% |
| Republican win (new seat) | | | |

=== District 115 ===
Primary Election Results
| Party | Candidate | Votes | % |
Republican Party Primary Results
| Republican | Cyndi Buchheit-Courtway (incumbent) | 4,230 | 100.00% |
| Total votes | | 4,230 | 100.00% |
Democratic Party Primary Results
| Democratic | Barbara Marco | 1,433 | 100.00% |
| Total votes | | 1,433 | 100.00% |

General Election Results
| Party | Candidate | Votes | % |
|---|---|---|---|
| Republican | Cyndi Buchheit-Courtway (incumbent) | 9,587 | 72.15% |
| Democratic | Barbara Marco | 3,701 | 27.85% |
| Total votes | | 13,288 | 100.00% |
| Republican hold | | | |

=== District 116 ===
Primary Election Results
| Party | Candidate | Votes | % |
Republican Party Primary Results
| Republican | Dale Wright (incumbent) | 3,995 | 100.00% |
| Total votes | | 3,995 | 100.00% |

General Election Results
| Party | Candidate | Votes | % |
|---|---|---|---|
| Republican | Dale Wright (incumbent) | 8,956 | 100.00% |
| Total votes | | 8,956 | 100.00% |
| Republican hold | | | |

=== District 117 ===
Primary Election Results
| Party | Candidate | Votes | % |
Republican Party Primary Results
| Republican | Mike Henderson (incumbent) | 3,477 | 100.00% |
| Total votes | | 3,477 | 100.00% |

General Election Results
| Party | Candidate | Votes | % |
|---|---|---|---|
| Republican | Mike Henderson (incumbent) | 8,722 | 100.00% |
| Total votes | | 8,722 | 100.00% |
| Republican hold | | | |

=== District 118 ===
Primary Election Results
| Party | Candidate | Votes | % |
Republican Party Primary Results
| Republican | Mike McGirl (incumbent) | 4,125 | 100.00% |
| Total votes | | 4,125 | 100.00% |
Democratic Party Primary Results
| Democratic | Sally Brooks | 969 | 100.00% |
| Total votes | | 969 | 100.00% |

General Election Results
| Party | Candidate | Votes | % |
|---|---|---|---|
| Republican | Mike McGirl (incumbent) | 9,420 | 75.64% |
| Democratic | Sally Brooks | 3,034 | 24.36% |
| Total votes | | 12,454 | 100.00% |
| Republican hold | | | |

=== District 119 ===
Primary Election Results
| Party | Candidate | Votes | % |
Republican Party Primary Results
| Republican | Brad Banderman | 2,268 | 52.37% |
| Republican | Marty L. Marler | 1,203 | 27.78% |
| Republican | Brian Pickard | 860 | 19.86% |
| Total votes | | 4,331 | 100.00% |

General Election Results
| Party | Candidate | Votes | % |
|---|---|---|---|
| Republican | Brad Banderman | 9,132 | 100.00% |
| Total votes | | 9,132 | 100.00% |
| Republican hold | | | |

=== District 120 ===
Primary Election Results
| Party | Candidate | Votes | % |
Republican Party Primary Results
| Republican | Ron Copeland (incumbent) | 5,171 | 83.08% |
| Republican | Matthew S. Williams | 1,053 | 16.92% |
| Total votes | | 6,224 | 100.00% |

General Election Results
| Party | Candidate | Votes | % |
|---|---|---|---|
| Republican | Ron Copeland (incumbent) | 11,028 | 100.00% |
| Total votes | | 11,028 | 100.00% |
| Republican hold | | | |

=== District 121 ===
Primary Election Results
| Party | Candidate | Votes | % |
Republican Party Primary Results
| Republican | Bill Hardwick (incumbent) | 1,310 | 100.00% |
| Total votes | | 1,310 | 100.00% |

General Election Results
| Party | Candidate | Votes | % |
|---|---|---|---|
| Republican | Bill Hardwick (incumbent) | 3,671 | 100.00% |
| Total votes | | 3,671 | 100.00% |
| Republican hold | | | |

=== District 122 ===
Primary Election Results
| Party | Candidate | Votes | % |
Republican Party Primary Results
| Republican | Tara Peters | 2,629 | 61.41% |
| Republican | Randy K. Barr | 1,652 | 38.59% |
| Total votes | | 4,281 | 100.00% |
Democratic Party Primary Results
| Democratic | Lisa McCarthy | 1,060 | 100.00% |
| Total votes | | 1,060 | 100.00% |

General Election Results
| Party | Candidate | Votes | % |
|---|---|---|---|
| Republican | Tara Peters | 7,755 | 69.06% |
| Democratic | Lisa McCarthy | 3,474 | 30.94% |
| Total votes | | 11,229 | 100.00% |
| Republican hold | | | |

=== District 123 ===
Primary Election Results
| Party | Candidate | Votes | % |
Republican Party Primary Results
| Republican | Lisa Thomas (incumbent) | 6,053 | 76.48% |
| Republican | Mindy Martin | 1,861 | 23.52% |
| Total votes | | 7,914 | 100.00% |

General Election Results
| Party | Candidate | Votes | % |
|---|---|---|---|
| Republican | Lisa Thomas (incumbent) | 13,903 | 100.00% |
| Total votes | | 13,903 | 100.00% |
| Republican hold | | | |

=== District 124 ===
Primary Election Results
| Party | Candidate | Votes | % |
Republican Party Primary Results
| Republican | Don Mayhew (incumbent) | 4,907 | 100.00% |
| Total votes | | 4,907 | 100.00% |

General Election Results
| Party | Candidate | Votes | % |
|---|---|---|---|
| Republican | Don Mayhew (incumbent) | 11,380 | 100.00% |
| Total votes | | 11,380 | 100.00% |
| Republican hold | | | |

=== District 125 ===
Primary Election Results
| Party | Candidate | Votes | % |
Republican Party Primary Results
| Republican | Dane Diehl | 5,100 | 69.55% |
| Republican | Dennis Turner | 1,297 | 17.69% |
| Republican | Andrew Hurt | 936 | 12.76% |
| Total votes | | 7,333 | 100.00% |
Libertarian Party Primary Results
| Libertarian | Robert E. Smith | 20 | 100.00% |
| Total votes | | 20 | 100.00% |

General Election Results
| Party | Candidate | Votes | % |
|---|---|---|---|
| Republican | Dane Diehl | 10,609 | 86.12% |
| Libertarian | Robert E. Smith | 1,710 | 13.88% |
| Total votes | | 12,319 | 100.00% |
| Republican hold | | | |

=== District 126 ===
Primary Election Results
| Party | Candidate | Votes | % |
Republican Party Primary Results
| Republican | Jim Kalberloh (incumbent) | 4,028 | 57.13% |
| Republican | David Kelsay | 3,023 | 42.87% |
| Total votes | | 7,051 | 100.00% |

General Election Results
| Party | Candidate | Votes | % |
|---|---|---|---|
| Republican | Jim Kalberloh (incumbent) | 11,605 | 100.00% |
| Total votes | | 11,605 | 100.00% |
| Republican hold | | | |

=== District 127 ===
Primary Election Results
| Party | Candidate | Votes | % |
Republican Party Primary Results
| Republican | Ann Kelley (incumbent) | 6,805 | 100.00% |
| Total votes | | 6,805 | 100.00% |
Democratic Party Primary Results
| Democratic | Marvin Manring | 463 | 100.00% |
| Total votes | | 463 | 100.00% |

General Election Results
| Party | Candidate | Votes | % |
|---|---|---|---|
| Republican | Ann Kelley (incumbent) | 11,553 | 85.09% |
| Democratic | Marvin Manring | 2,024 | 14.91% |
| Total votes | | 13,577 | 100.00% |
| Republican hold | | | |

=== District 128 ===
Primary Election Results
| Party | Candidate | Votes | % |
Republican Party Primary Results
| Republican | Mike Stephens (incumbent) | 5,318 | 100.00% |
| Total votes | | 5,318 | 100.00% |
Democratic Party Primary Results
| Democratic | Rich Horton | 735 | 100.00% |
| Total votes | | 735 | 100.00% |

General Election Results
| Party | Candidate | Votes | % |
|---|---|---|---|
| Republican | Mike Stephens (incumbent) | 10,745 | 82.36% |
| Democratic | Rich Horton | 2,302 | 17.64% |
| Total votes | | 13,047 | 100.00% |
| Republican hold | | | |

=== District 129 ===
Primary Election Results
| Party | Candidate | Votes | % |
Republican Party Primary Results
| Republican | John F. Black (incumbent) | 5,936 | 100.00% |
| Total votes | | 5,936 | 100.00% |

General Election Results
| Party | Candidate | Votes | % |
|---|---|---|---|
| Republican | John F. Black (incumbent) | 12,106 | 100.00% |
| Total votes | | 12,106 | 100.00% |
| Republican hold | | | |

=== District 130 ===
Primary Election Results
| Party | Candidate | Votes | % |
Republican Party Primary Results
| Republican | Bishop Davidson (incumbent) | 3,705 | 100.00% |
| Total votes | | 3,705 | 100.00% |

General Election Results
| Party | Candidate | Votes | % |
|---|---|---|---|
| Republican | Bishop Davidson (incumbent) | 9,434 | 100.00% |
| Total votes | | 9,434 | 100.00% |
| Republican hold | | | |

=== District 131 ===
Primary Election Results
| Party | Candidate | Votes | % |
Republican Party Primary Results
| Republican | Bill Owen (incumbent) | 5,245 | 100.00% |
| Total votes | | 5,245 | 100.00% |

General Election Results
| Party | Candidate | Votes | % |
|---|---|---|---|
| Republican | Bill Owen (incumbent) | 12,492 | 100.00% |
| Total votes | | 12,492 | 100.00% |
| Republican hold | | | |

=== District 132 ===
Primary Election Results
| Party | Candidate | Votes | % |
Democratic Party Primary Results
| Democratic | Crystal Quade (incumbent) | 1,161 | 100.00% |
| Total votes | | 1,161 | 100.00% |
Republican Party Primary Results
| Republican | Stephanos Freeman | 1,470 | 100.00% |
| Total votes | | 1,470 | 100.00% |

General Election Results
| Party | Candidate | Votes | % |
|---|---|---|---|
| Democratic | Crystal Quade (incumbent) | 3,968 | 56.34% |
| Republican | Stephanos Freeman | 3,075 | 43.66% |
| Total votes | | 7,043 | 100.00% |
| Democratic hold | | | |

=== District 133 ===
Primary Election Results
| Party | Candidate | Votes | % |
Republican Party Primary Results
| Republican | Melanie Stinnett | 1,892 | 100.00% |
| Total votes | | 1,892 | 100.00% |
Democratic Party Primary Results
| Democratic | Amy Blansit | 1,288 | 100.00% |
| Total votes | | 1,288 | 100.00% |

General Election Results
| Party | Candidate | Votes | % |
|---|---|---|---|
| Republican | Melanie Stinnett | 4,468 | 52.39% |
| Democratic | Amy Blansit | 4,061 | 47.61% |
| Total votes | | 8,529 | 100.00% |
| Republican hold | | | |

=== District 134 ===
Primary Election Results
| Party | Candidate | Votes | % |
Republican Party Primary Results
| Republican | Alex Riley (incumbent) | 4,465 | 100.00% |
| Total votes | | 4,465 | 100.00% |
Democratic Party Primary Results
| Democratic | Samantha Deaton | 1,579 | 100.00% |
| Total votes | | 1,579 | 100.00% |

General Election Results
| Party | Candidate | Votes | % |
|---|---|---|---|
| Republican | Alex Riley (incumbent) | 8,876 | 63.03% |
| Democratic | Samantha Deaton | 5,206 | 36.97% |
| Total votes | | 14,082 | 100.00% |
| Republican hold | | | |

=== District 135 ===
Primary Election Results
| Party | Candidate | Votes | % |
Democratic Party Primary Results
| Democratic | Betsy Fogle (incumbent) | 2,161 | 100.00% |
| Total votes | | 2,161 | 100.00% |
Republican Party Primary Results
| Republican | AJ Exner | 2,226 | 100.00% |
| Total votes | | 2,226 | 100.00% |

General Election Results
| Party | Candidate | Votes | % |
|---|---|---|---|
| Democratic | Betsy Fogle (incumbent) | 6,071 | 56.26% |
| Republican | AJ Exner | 4,720 | 43.74% |
| Total votes | | 10,791 | 100.00% |
| Democratic hold | | | |

=== District 136 ===
Primary Election Results
| Party | Candidate | Votes | % |
Republican Party Primary Results
| Republican | Craig Fishel (incumbent) | 3,450 | 100.00% |
| Total votes | | 3,450 | 100.00% |
Democratic Party Primary Results
| Democratic | Stephanie Hein | 2,353 | 100.00% |
| Total votes | | 2,353 | 100.00% |

General Election Results
| Party | Candidate | Votes | % |
|---|---|---|---|
| Democratic | Stephanie Hein | 6,917 | 50.74% |
| Republican | Craig Fishel (incumbent) | 6,714 | 49.26% |
| Total votes | | 13,631 | 100.00% |
| Democratic gain from Republican | | | |

=== District 137 ===
Primary Election Results
| Party | Candidate | Votes | % |
Republican Party Primary Results
| Republican | Darin Chappell | 3,519 | 50.80% |
| Republican | Thomas R. (Tom) Barr | 3,408 | 49.20% |
| Total votes | | 6,927 | 100.00% |

General Election Results
| Party | Candidate | Votes | % |
|---|---|---|---|
| Republican | Darin Chappell | 13,708 | 100.00% |
| Total votes | | 13,708 | 100.00% |
| Republican hold | | | |

=== District 138 ===
Primary Election Results
| Party | Candidate | Votes | % |
Republican Party Primary Results
| Republican | Brad Hudson (incumbent) | 6,650 | 100.00% |
| Total votes | | 6,650 | 100.00% |

General Election Results
| Party | Candidate | Votes | % |
|---|---|---|---|
| Republican | Brad Hudson (incumbent) | 14,345 | 100.00% |
| Total votes | | 14,345 | 100.00% |
| Republican hold | | | |

=== District 139 ===
Primary Election Results
| Party | Candidate | Votes | % |
Republican Party Primary Results
| Republican | Bob Titus | 4,836 | 100.00% |
| Total votes | | 4,836 | 100.00% |

General Election Results
| Party | Candidate | Votes | % |
|---|---|---|---|
| Republican | Bob Titus | 12,011 | 100.00% |
| Total votes | | 12,011 | 100.00% |
| Republican hold | | | |

=== District 140 ===
Primary Election Results
| Party | Candidate | Votes | % |
Republican Party Primary Results
| Republican | Jamie Gragg | 3,159 | 60.45% |
| Republican | Danny Garrison | 2,067 | 39.55% |
| Total votes | | 5,226 | 100.00% |
Democratic Party Primary Results
| Democratic | Amy Freeland | 799 | 100.00% |
| Total votes | | 799 | 100.00% |

General Election Results
| Party | Candidate | Votes | % |
|---|---|---|---|
| Republican | Jamie Gragg | 10,605 | 77.30% |
| Democratic | Amy Freeland | 3,115 | 22.70% |
| Total votes | | 13,720 | 100.00% |
| Republican win (new seat) | | | |

=== District 141 ===
Primary Election Results
| Party | Candidate | Votes | % |
Republican Party Primary Results
| Republican | Hannah Kelly (incumbent) | 5,907 | 100.00% |
| Total votes | | 5,907 | 100.00% |

General Election Results
| Party | Candidate | Votes | % |
|---|---|---|---|
| Republican | Hannah Kelly (incumbent) | 12,855 | 100.00% |
| Total votes | | 12,855 | 100.00% |
| Republican hold | | | |

=== District 142 ===
Primary Election Results
| Party | Candidate | Votes | % |
Republican Party Primary Results
| Republican | Jeff Knight (incumbent) | 4,775 | 85.77% |
| Republican | Royce E. Tuck | 792 | 14.23% |
| Total votes | | 5,567 | 100.00% |

General Election Results
| Party | Candidate | Votes | % |
|---|---|---|---|
| Republican | Jeff Knight (incumbent) | 10,707 | 100.00% |
| Total votes | | 10,707 | 100.00% |
| Republican hold | | | |

=== District 143 ===
Primary Election Results
| Party | Candidate | Votes | % |
Republican Party Primary Results
| Republican | Bennie Cook (incumbent) | 4,041 | 71.53% |
| Republican | Christopher Davis | 877 | 15.52% |
| Republican | Philip Lohmann | 731 | 12.94% |
| Total votes | | 5,649 | 100.00% |
Democratic Party Primary Results
| Democratic | Bernadette Holzer | 761 | 100.00% |
| Total votes | | 761 | 100.00% |

General Election Results
| Party | Candidate | Votes | % |
|---|---|---|---|
| Republican | Bennie Cook (incumbent) | 11,866 | 85.02% |
| Democratic | Bernadette Holzer | 2,090 | 14.98% |
| Total votes | | 13,956 | 100.00% |
| Republican hold | | | |

=== District 144 ===
Primary Election Results
| Party | Candidate | Votes | % |
Republican Party Primary Results
| Republican | Chris Dinkins (incumbent) | 4,615 | 100.00% |
| Total votes | | 4,615 | 100.00% |

General Election Results
| Party | Candidate | Votes | % |
|---|---|---|---|
| Republican | Chris Dinkins (incumbent) | 11,910 | 100.00% |
| Total votes | | 11,910 | 100.00% |
| Republican hold | | | |

=== District 145 ===
Primary Election Results
| Party | Candidate | Votes | % |
Republican Party Primary Results
| Republican | Rick Francis (incumbent) | 3,810 | 100.00% |
| Total votes | | 3,810 | 100.00% |

General Election Results
| Party | Candidate | Votes | % |
|---|---|---|---|
| Republican | Rick Francis (incumbent) | 10,482 | 100.00% |
| Total votes | | 10,482 | 100.00% |
| Republican hold | | | |

=== District 146 ===
Primary Election Results
| Party | Candidate | Votes | % |
Republican Party Primary Results
| Republican | Barry D. Hovis (incumbent) | 4,522 | 100.00% |
| Total votes | | 4,522 | 100.00% |

General Election Results
| Party | Candidate | Votes | % |
|---|---|---|---|
| Republican | Barry D. Hovis (incumbent) | 13,264 | 100.00% |
| Total votes | | 13,264 | 100.00% |
| Republican hold | | | |

=== District 147 ===
Primary Election Results
| Party | Candidate | Votes | % |
Republican Party Primary Results
| Republican | John Voss | 1,616 | 40.02% |
| Republican | Elaine Edgar | 1,237 | 30.63% |
| Republican | Nathan Thomas | 1,185 | 29.35% |
| Total votes | | 4,038 | 100.00% |
Democratic Party Primary Results
| Democratic | Andy Leighton | 911 | 100.00% |
| Total votes | | 911 | 100.00% |
Libertarian Party Primary Results
| Libertarian | Greg Tlapek | 19 | 100.00% |
| Total votes | | 19 | 100.00% |

General Election Results
| Party | Candidate | Votes | % |
|---|---|---|---|
| Republican | John Voss | 6,990 | 64.45% |
| Democratic | Andy Leighton | 3,405 | 31.40% |
| Libertarian | Greg Tlapek | 450 | 4.15% |
| Total votes | | 10,845 | 100.00% |
| Republican win (new seat) | | | |

=== District 148 ===
Primary Election Results
| Party | Candidate | Votes | % |
Republican Party Primary Results
| Republican | Jamie Burger (incumbent) | 4,471 | 100.00% |
| Total votes | | 4,471 | 100.00% |

General Election Results
| Party | Candidate | Votes | % |
|---|---|---|---|
| Republican | Jamie Burger (incumbent) | 10,107 | 100.00% |
| Total votes | | 10,107 | 100.00% |
| Republican hold | | | |

=== District 149 ===
Primary Election Results
| Party | Candidate | Votes | % |
Republican Party Primary Results
| Republican | Donnie Brown | 2,293 | 69.38% |
| Republican | Eric Garris | 1,012 | 30.62% |
| Total votes | | 3,305 | 100.00% |

General Election Results
| Party | Candidate | Votes | % |
|---|---|---|---|
| Republican | Donnie Brown | 7,864 | 100.00% |
| Total votes | | 7,864 | 100.00% |
| Republican hold | | | |

=== District 150 ===
Primary Election Results
| Party | Candidate | Votes | % |
Republican Party Primary Results
| Republican | Cameron Parker | 2,444 | 100.00% |
| Total votes | | 2,444 | 100.00% |

General Election Results
| Party | Candidate | Votes | % |
|---|---|---|---|
| Republican | Cameron Parker | 8,043 | 100.00% |
| Total votes | | 8,043 | 100.00% |
| Republican hold | | | |

=== District 151 ===
Primary Election Results
| Party | Candidate | Votes | % |
Republican Party Primary Results
| Republican | Herman Morse (incumbent) | 6,192 | 100.00% |
| Total votes | | 6,192 | 100.00% |

General Election Results
| Party | Candidate | Votes | % |
|---|---|---|---|
| Republican | Herman Morse (incumbent) | 11,227 | 100.00% |
| Total votes | | 11,227 | 100.00% |
| Republican hold | | | |

=== District 152 ===
Primary Election Results
| Party | Candidate | Votes | % |
Republican Party Primary Results
| Republican | Hardy W. Billington (incumbent) | 3,255 | 100.00% |
| Total votes | | 3,255 | 100.00% |

General Election Results
| Party | Candidate | Votes | % |
|---|---|---|---|
| Republican | Hardy W. Billington (incumbent) | 8,658 | 100.00% |
| Total votes | | 8,658 | 100.00% |
| Republican hold | | | |

=== District 153 ===
Primary Election Results
| Party | Candidate | Votes | % |
Republican Party Primary Results
| Republican | Darrell Atchison (incumbent) | 5,280 | 100.00% |
| Total votes | | 5,280 | 100.00% |

General Election Results
| Party | Candidate | Votes | % |
|---|---|---|---|
| Republican | Darrell Atchison (incumbent) | 12,019 | 100.00% |
| Total votes | | 12,019 | 100.00% |
| Republican hold | | | |

=== District 154 ===
Primary Election Results
| Party | Candidate | Votes | % |
Republican Party Primary Results
| Republican | David Paul Evans (incumbent) | 4,433 | 100.00% |
| Total votes | | 4,433 | 100.00% |

General Election Results
| Party | Candidate | Votes | % |
|---|---|---|---|
| Republican | David Paul Evans (incumbent) | 11,345 | 100.00% |
| Total votes | | 11,345 | 100.00% |
| Republican hold | | | |

=== District 155 ===
Primary Election Results
| Party | Candidate | Votes | % |
Republican Party Primary Results
| Republican | Travis Smith (incumbent) | 6,289 | 100.00% |
| Total votes | | 6,289 | 100.00% |

General Election Results
| Party | Candidate | Votes | % |
|---|---|---|---|
| Republican | Travis Smith (incumbent) | 13,791 | 100.00% |
| Total votes | | 13,791 | 100.00% |
| Republican hold | | | |

=== District 156 ===
Primary Election Results
| Party | Candidate | Votes | % |
Republican Party Primary Results
| Republican | Brian Seitz (incumbent) | 3,887 | 100.00% |
| Total votes | | 3,887 | 100.00% |
Democratic Party Primary Results
| Democratic | Ginger Kissee Witty | 409 | 75.46% |
| Democratic | Dale A. Speelman | 133 | 24.54% |
| Total votes | | 542 | 100.00% |

General Election Results
| Party | Candidate | Votes | % |
|---|---|---|---|
| Republican | Brian Seitz (incumbent) | 8,765 | 77.88% |
| Democratic | Ginger Kissee Witty | 2,489 | 22.12% |
| Total votes | | 11,254 | 100.00% |
| Republican hold | | | |

=== District 157 ===
Primary Election Results
| Party | Candidate | Votes | % |
Republican Party Primary Results
| Republican | Mitch Boggs (incumbent) | 4,311 | 65.41% |
| Republican | Wally Long | 2,280 | 34.59% |
| Total votes | | 6,591 | 100.00% |

General Election Results
| Party | Candidate | Votes | % |
|---|---|---|---|
| Republican | Mitch Boggs (incumbent) | 10,766 | 100.00% |
| Total votes | | 10,766 | 100.00% |
| Republican hold | | | |

=== District 158 ===
Primary Election Results
| Party | Candidate | Votes | % |
Republican Party Primary Results
| Republican | Scott Cupps (incumbent) | 4,896 | 100.00% |
| Total votes | | 4,896 | 100.00% |

General Election Results
| Party | Candidate | Votes | % |
|---|---|---|---|
| Republican | Scott Cupps (incumbent) | 10,808 | 99.91% |
| Republican | Jeremy Gundel (Note: The candidate ran a write-in campaign in this election.) | 10 | 0.09% |
| Total votes | | 10,818 | 100.00% |
| Republican hold | | | |

=== District 159 ===
Primary Election Results
| Party | Candidate | Votes | % |
Republican Party Primary Results
| Republican | Dirk Deaton (incumbent) | 4,681 | 100.00% |
| Total votes | | 4,681 | 100.00% |

General Election Results
| Party | Candidate | Votes | % |
|---|---|---|---|
| Republican | Dirk Deaton (incumbent) | 10,637 | 100.00% |
| Total votes | | 10,637 | 100.00% |
| Republican hold | | | |

=== District 160 ===
Primary Election Results
| Party | Candidate | Votes | % |
Republican Party Primary Results
| Republican | Ben Baker (incumbent) | 5,478 | 100.00% |
| Total votes | | 5,478 | 100.00% |

General Election Results
| Party | Candidate | Votes | % |
|---|---|---|---|
| Republican | Ben Baker (incumbent) | 11,034 | 100.00% |
| Total votes | | 11,034 | 100.00% |
| Republican hold | | | |

=== District 161 ===
Primary Election Results
| Party | Candidate | Votes | % |
Republican Party Primary Results
| Republican | Lane Roberts (incumbent) | 2,405 | 72.40% |
| Republican | Thomas Ross | 917 | 27.60% |
| Total votes | | 3,322 | 100.00% |

General Election Results
| Party | Candidate | Votes | % |
|---|---|---|---|
| Republican | Lane Roberts (incumbent) | 6,819 | 100.00% |
| Total votes | | 6,819 | 100.00% |
| Republican hold | | | |

=== District 162 ===
Primary Election Results
| Party | Candidate | Votes | % |
Republican Party Primary Results
| Republican | Bob Bromley (incumbent) | 4,239 | 100.00% |
| Total votes | | 4,239 | 100.00% |

General Election Results
| Party | Candidate | Votes | % |
|---|---|---|---|
| Republican | Bob Bromley (incumbent) | 9,869 | 100.00% |
| Total votes | | 9,869 | 100.00% |
| Republican hold | | | |

=== District 163 ===
Primary Election Results
| Party | Candidate | Votes | % |
Republican Party Primary Results
| Republican | Cody Smith (incumbent) | 4,881 | 100.00% |
| Total votes | | 4,881 | 100.00% |

General Election Results
| Party | Candidate | Votes | % |
|---|---|---|---|
| Republican | Cody Smith (incumbent) | 8,911 | 100.00% |
| Total votes | | 8,911 | 100.00% |
| Republican hold | | | |

== See also ==
- 2022 United States elections
- 2022 United States Senate election in Missouri
- 2022 United States House of Representatives elections in Missouri
- 2022 Missouri elections
- 2022 Missouri Senate election
- Missouri General Assembly
- Missouri House of Representatives
