= Phil Amato =

American politician

Member of the Missouri House of Representatives from the 113th district
- Incumbent
- Assumed office January 4, 2023
- Preceded by: Dan Shaul

Personal details
- Born: St. Louis, Missouri, U.S.
- Party: Republican
- Education: St. Louis Community College–Meramec
- Website: https://amatoforjeffco.com/

Phil Amato is an American politician serving as a Republican member of the Missouri House of Representatives, representing the state's 113th House district. In the 2022 Missouri House of Representatives election, Amato was elected in District 113.

In 2025, Amato sponsored a bill to create a central registry of pregnant women “at risk for seeking abortion services” and establish a Division of Maternal and Child Resources within the Department of Social Services, which he described as an "eHarmony for babies." The bill was written by adoption attorney Gerard Harms.
