= Aaron McMullen =

American politician

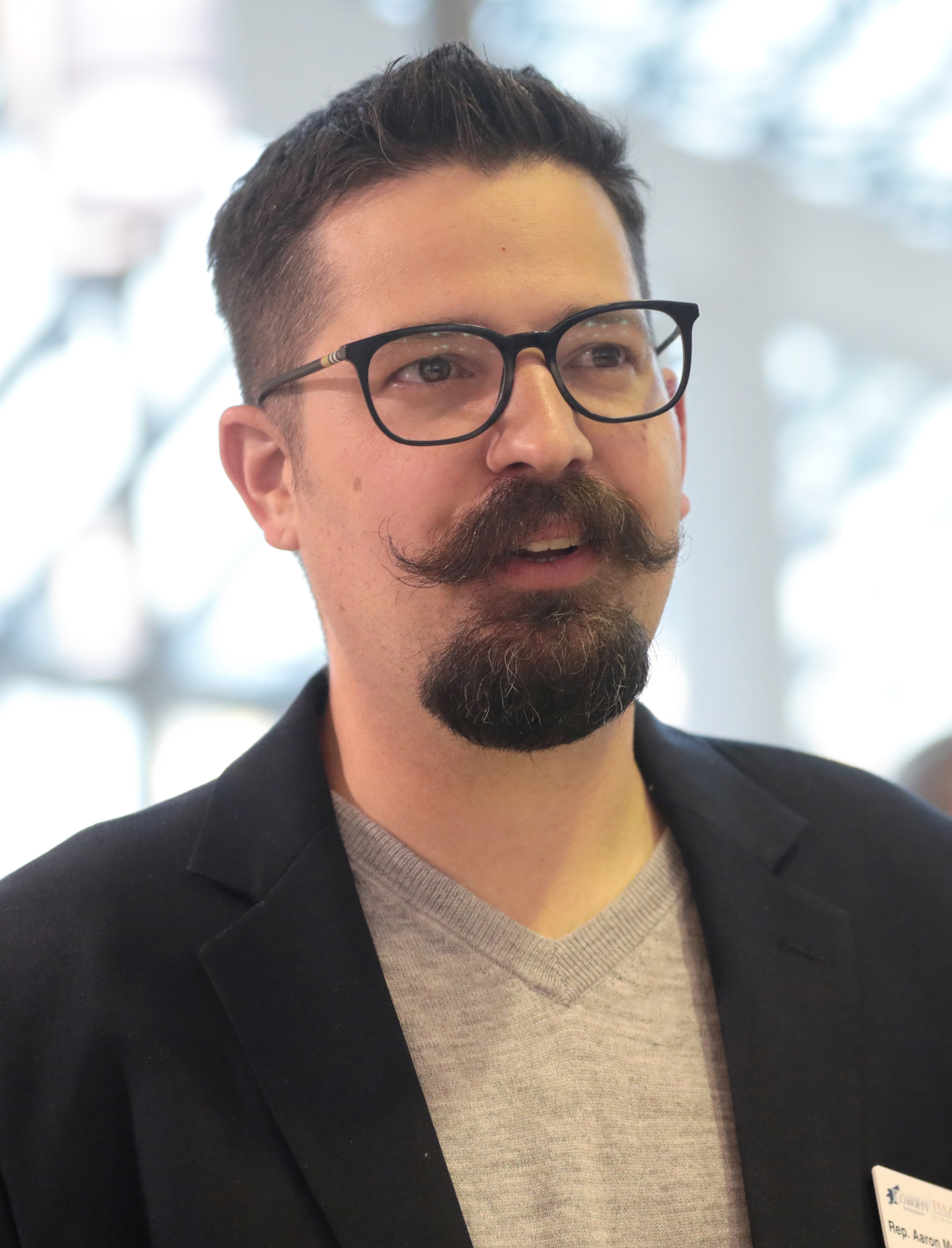
- McMullen in 2022

Member of the Missouri House of Representatives from the 20th district
- In office January 4, 2023 – January 8, 2025
- Preceded by: Bill Kidd
- Succeeded by: Mike Steinmeyer

Personal details
- Born: Tulsa, Oklahoma, U.S.
- Party: Republican
- Education: University of Missouri–Kansas City; Washington University in St. Louis

Aaron McMullen is an American politician who was a member of the Missouri House of Representatives for the 20th district. He is a member of the Republican Party.

== Personal life ==
McMullen resides in Independence, Missouri, where he grew up. After high school, he joined the United States Army and served in a combat unit in Afghanistan.

== Electoral history ==
2022 Missouri House of Representatives election, District 20
Party	Candidate	Votes	%
Republican	Aaron McMullen	6,402	58.2
Democratic	Mike Englert	4,604	41.8
Total votes		11,006	100
