= Michael Burton (politician) =

American politician

Member of the Missouri House of Representatives from the 92nd district
- Incumbent
- Assumed office January 6, 2021
- Preceded by: Doug Beck

Personal details
- Born: Affton, Missouri, U.S.
- Party: Democratic

Michael Burton is an American politician and former theatre performer serving as a member of the Missouri House of Representatives from the 92nd district. Elected in November 2020, he assumed office on January 6, 2021.

== Early life and education ==
Burton was born in Affton, Missouri. He graduated from Christian Brothers College High School in St. Louis and briefly attended Lindenwood University, though he left the school to move to New York City and perform on Broadway.

== Career ==
In 2001, Burton originated the role of Ben Rogers in the Broadway production of The Adventures of Tom Sawyer. He also appeared on the cast recording of the show. Burton returned to Missouri in 2011 and worked as a teacher. He became involved with local politics and activism when he joined a movement to prevent the construction of a housing development on the site of Tower Tee, a historic golf course. Burton was elected to the Missouri House of Representatives in November 2020 and assumed office on January 6, 2021.

== Electoral history ==
Missouri House of Representatives Election, November 3, 2020, District 92
Party	Candidate	Votes	%	±%
Democratic	Michael Burton	11,030	55.47%	
Republican	Bill Heisse	8,854	44.53%	
Total votes		19,884	100.00%	

Missouri House of Representatives Primary Election, August 2, 2022, District 92
Party	Candidate	Votes	%	±%
Democratic	Michael Burton	1,731	51.67%	
Democratic	Kenny Edgar	1,619	48.33%	
Total votes		3,350	100.00%	

Missouri House of Representatives Election, November 8, 2022, District 92
Party	Candidate	Votes	%	±%
Democratic	Michael Burton	7,235	51.17%	−4.30
Republican	Bob Mahacek	6,903	48.83%	+4.30
Total votes		14,138	100.00%	
