= Bob Burns (Missouri politician) =

American politician

Member of the Missouri House of Representatives from the 93rd district
- In office January 9, 2013 – January 6, 2021
- Preceded by: Dwight Scharnhorst
- Succeeded by: Bridget Walsh Moore

Personal details
- Born: June 16, 1948 (age 78) St. Louis, Missouri, U.S.
- Party: Democratic

Bob Burns is an American politician and Democratic member of the Missouri House of Representatives representing District 93 since January 9, 2013.

Burns has previously held public office as a member of the St. Louis Community College Board of Trustees, Affton, Missouri School District Board of Education, and Alderman for the City of St. George, Missouri.

Burns worked on the Congressional Staff of U.S. Congressman Richard Gephardt from 1995 to 1999 and the Senatorial Staff of U.S. Senator Claire McCaskill from 2007 to 2010.

He was inducted into the Affton School District Hall of Fame in 2010.

== Political history ==
Burns first ran for the Missouri House of Representatives in 2006, seeking the House District 85 seat, but was unsuccessful. Redistricted to District 93 in 2012, he defeated fellow Democrat Joe Montecillo by earning 59-percent of the votes cast. He faced Republican Tony Leech in the November 6, 2012 General election, winning with nearly 65 percent of the vote.

Missouri 93rd District State Representative Election 2012 - Democratic Primary
Party	Candidate	Votes	%	±%
Democratic	Bob Burns	1,369	59.0	Winner
Democratic	Joe Montecillo	950	41.0	

In the 2012 November general election, Burns faced Republican Tony Leech, winning by over 4,000 votes to earn his first term in the legislature.

Missouri 93rd District State Representative Election 2012
Party	Candidate	Votes	%	±%
Democratic	Bob Burns	8,815	64.7	Winner
Republican	Tony Leech	4,810	35.3	

In the 2014 November general election, Burns faced Republican Garrett Mees, with broad voter support, he claimed his second term in the legislature.

Missouri 93rd District State Representative Election 2014
Party	Candidate	Votes	%	±%
Democratic	Bob Burns (Incumbent)	4,123	59.2	Winner
Republican	Garrett Mees	2,846	40.8	
