= Glen Kolkmeyer =

American politician

Member of the Missouri House of Representatives from the 53rd district
- In office 2013–2021
- Preceded by: Mike McGhee
- Succeeded by: Terry Thompson

Personal details
- Born: 1958 (age 67–68) Kansas City, Missouri
- Party: Republican
- Spouse: Lisa Kolkmeyer
- Profession: Politician
- Website: www.friendsofglenkolkmeyer.com

Glen Kolkmeyer served as a Republican member of the Missouri House of Representatives from 2013 to 2021. He represented Lafayette County and parts of Jackson and Johnson counties (District 53). He was re-elected to his third two-year term in November 2016. Representative Kolkmeyer served as the majority caucus chair in the Missouri House of Representatives. He also serves on the following committees: Administration and Accounts, Ethics, Transportation, and the Joint Committee on Transportation Oversight.

In addition to his legislative duties from 2013 to 2021, Kolkmeyer is owner and CEO of Energy Transport Solutions, Inc. in Bates City, Missouri. The family owned and operated company hauls gasoline, diesel, propane and anhydrous ammonia. Glen's parents, Omer and Dorothy started in the propane business in 1955. Glen's Wife, Lisa, serves as the office manager, and the third generation: their son, Eric is the general manager, and their daughter Emily is the billing clerk.

Representative Kolkmeyer also served 20 years as fire chief of the Wellington-Napoleon Fire Protection District and served 39 years on the Fire Service.

Representative Kolkmeyer was a former president of Missouri Propane Gas (safety) Commission, Missouri Propane Gas Association and Lafayette County Firefighters Association. He is also the current president of the Lafayette County Law Enforcement Restitution Fund, a member of National Rifle Association, a past board member of the Wellington-Napoleon Protection District and the Lafayette County 9-1-1 Board. Representative Kolkmeyer attends Calvary Baptist Church in Odessa.

Born in Kansas City, Missouri, Kolkmeyer currently resides in rural Wellington with his wife, Lisa. They have a son, Eric, and daughter, Emily, and five grandchildren.
