= Brad Banderman =

American politician

Member of the Missouri House of Representatives from the 119th district
- Incumbent
- Assumed office January 4, 2023
- Preceded by: Nate Tate

Personal details
- Born: Festus, Missouri, U.S.
- Party: Republican
- Education: Missouri Baptist College
- Website: https://www.banderman4rep119.com/

Brad Banderman is an American politician serving as a Republican member of the Missouri House of Representatives, representing the state's 119th House district.

== Career ==
Banderman is a youth pastor at his church in Lonedell, and works as a substitute teacher and bus driver.

In the 2022 Missouri House of Representatives election, Banderman was elected in District 119.

== Personal life ==
Banderman and his wife have two children.
