= Bob Titus =

American politician

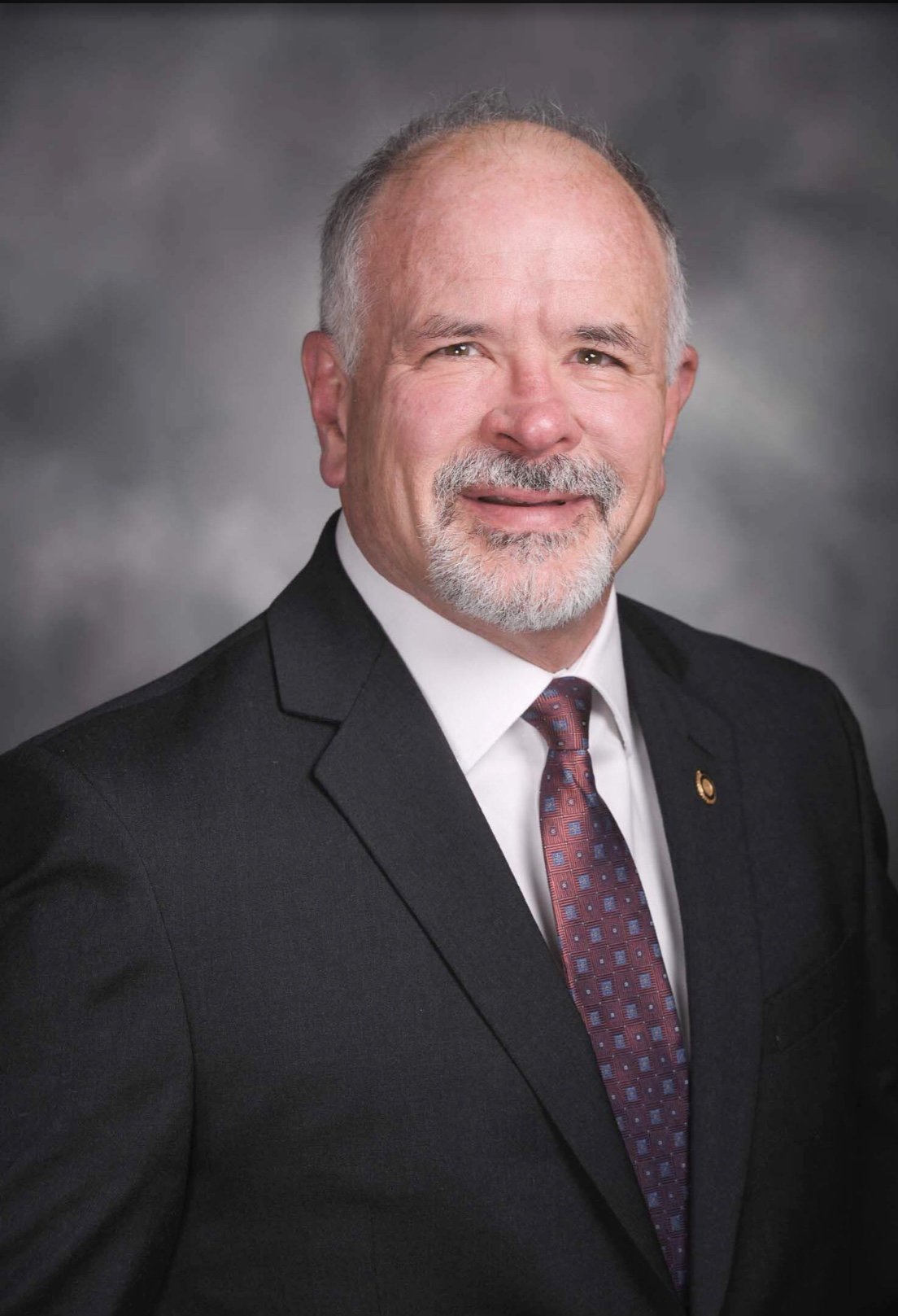
- Bob Titus January 2023

Member of the Missouri House of Representatives from the 139th district
- Incumbent
- Assumed office January 4, 2023
- Preceded by: Jered Taylor

Personal details
- Born: Robert Edmund Titus Jr; 12/14/1960
- Party: Republican
- Education: Missouri State University
- Website: https://www.titus4missouri.com/

Robert Edmund Titus Jr. is an American politician who has been serving as a Republican member of the Missouri House of Representatives, representing the state's 139th House district since 2023.

== Career ==
Titus a small businessman. In the 2022 Missouri House of Representatives election, Titus was elected in District 139. Titus has a degree in Accounting from Missouri State University.

He was an agent for American Family Insurance in Springfield, MO from 1993-2023.

== Personal life ==
Titus was married to Tammy Titus (Harrell) in 1984. He is a father to ten children.
