= Bridget Walsh Moore =

American politician

Member of the Missouri House of Representatives from the 93rd district
- Incumbent
- Assumed office January 6, 2021
- Preceded by: Bob Burns

Personal details
- Born: Kirkwood, Missouri, U.S.
- Party: Democratic
- Website: bridgetformissouri.com

Bridget Walsh Moore is a Democratic member of the Missouri House of Representatives, representing the state's 93rd House district.

== Career ==
Walsh Moore graduated from Ursuline Academy in St. Louis in 2006 and Bradley University's Institute of International Studies in 2010. She also became certified in international trade through the World Trade Center, and was a founding member of the North Broadway Business Development Community.

She defeated Republican Gabriel Jones in the November 3, 2020 general election, and considers Medicaid expansion and disabilities rights to be top priorities.

== Electoral history ==
- Rep. Walsh Moore has not yet had any opponents in the Democratic primary elections, thus she has been nominated each time by default.

Missouri House of Representatives Election, November 3, 2020, District 93
Party	Candidate	Votes	%	±%
Democratic	Bridget Walsh Moore	7,625	53.64%	
Republican	Gabriel Jones	6,590	46.36%	
Total votes		14,215	100.00%	

Missouri House of Representatives Election, November 8, 2022, District 93
Party	Candidate	Votes	%	±%
Democratic	Bridget Walsh Moore	5,129	54.67%	+1.03
Republican	Kenneth Abram	4,253	45.33%	−1.03
Total votes		9,382	100.00%	

== Personal life ==
Walsh Moore is a cancer survivor and amputee. She and her husband Greg are active members of Our Lady of Sorrows Catholic Church.
