= Donnie Brown =

American politician

Member of the Missouri House of Representatives from the 149th district
- In office January 4, 2023 – August 21, 2025
- Preceded by: Don Rone Jr.
- Succeeded by: Scott Crumpecker (elect)

Personal details
- Born: Sikeston, Missouri, U.S.
- Party: Republican
- Education: Missouri University of Science and Technology

Donnie Brown is an American politician who served as a Republican member of the Missouri House of Representatives, representing the state's 149th House district.

In the 2022 Missouri House of Representatives election, Brown was elected in District 149. Prior to his election he served as mayor of New Madrid for 12 years.

Brown resigned from the state house on August 21, 2025, after being appointed Southeast District Engineer at the Missouri Department of Transportation.
