= Hannah Kelly (politician) =

American politician (born 1988)

Member of the Missouri House of Representatives from the 141st district
- In office January 4, 2017 – January 8, 2025
- Preceded by: Tony Dugger
- Succeeded by: Melissa Schmidt

Personal details
- Born: February 15, 1988 (age 38) Norwood, Missouri, U.S.
- Party: Republican
- Education: Three Rivers College; Missouri State University, West Plains (AA)

Hannah Kelly (born February 15, 1988) is an American politician who served in the Missouri House of Representatives from the 141st district from 2017 to 2025. Her district is mostly rural in south central missouri a few miles east of Springfield.
