= Terry Thompson (politician) =

American politician

Member of the Missouri House of Representatives from the 53rd District
- Incumbent
- Assumed office January 6, 2021
- Preceded by: Glen Kolkmeyer

Personal details
- Party: Republican

Terry Thompson is an American politician currently serving in the Missouri House of Representatives from Missouri's 53rd district. He won the seat after defeating Democrat Connie Simmons 67.6% to 22.9%, with other candidates receiving 9.5% of the vote. He was sworn in on January 6, 2021.

== Electoral history ==
Missouri House of Representatives Election, November 3, 2020, District 53
Party	Candidate	Votes	%	±%
Republican	Terry Thompson	12,288	67.56%	
Democratic	Connie Simmons	4,170	22.93%	
Independent	Aaron Mais	1,414	7.77%	
Libertarian	Cameron Pack	316	1.74%	
Total votes		18,188	100.00%	

Missouri House of Representatives Election, November 8, 2022, District 53
Party	Candidate	Votes	%	±%
Republican	Terry Thompson	10,934	100.00%	+32.44
Total votes		10,934	100.00%	
