= Gretchen Bangert =

American politician

Member of the Missouri House of Representatives from the 69th (2017–2023) and 70th (2023–2025) district
- In office January 4, 2017 – January 8, 2025
- Preceded by: Margo McNeil
- Succeeded by: Stephanie Boykin

Personal details
- Born: June 11, 1966 (age 60) Evanston, Illinois, U.S.
- Party: Democratic

Gretchen Bangert (born June 11, 1966) is an American politician who served in the Missouri House of Representatives from 2017 to 2025. She was first elected from the 69th district, then in 2022 from the 70th district. In 2024, she stood down from the state legislature to run for St. Louis County Council.

== Electoral history ==
=== State representative ===
Missouri House of Representatives Primary Election, August 2, 2016, District 69
Party	Candidate	Votes	%	±%
Democratic	Gretchen Bangert	2,539	72.58%	
Democratic	Jerome (Jerry) Burke	959	27.42%	
Total votes		3,498	100.00%	

Missouri House of Representatives Election, November 8, 2016, District 69
Party	Candidate	Votes	%	±%
Democratic	Gretchen Bangert	13,513	100.00%	+34.43
Total votes		13,513	100.00%	

Missouri House of Representatives Election, November 6, 2018, District 69
Party	Candidate	Votes	%	±%
Democratic	Gretchen Bangert	10,367	69.93%	−30.07
Republican	Adam Jenning	4,130	27.86%	+27.86
Libertarian	Eric S. Harris	327	2.21%	+2.21
Total votes		14,824	100.00%	

Missouri House of Representatives Election, November 3, 2020, District 69
Party	Candidate	Votes	%	±%
Democratic	Gretchen Bangert	12,284	71.26%	+1.33
Republican	Scott Cazadd	4,954	28.74%	+0.88
Total votes		17,238	100.00%	

Missouri House of Representatives Primary Election, August 2, 2022, District 70
Party	Candidate	Votes	%	±%
Democratic	Gretchen Bangert	1,979	62.08%	
Democratic	Stephanie Boykin	1,209	37.92%	
Total votes		3,188	100.00%	

Missouri House of Representatives Election, November 8, 2022, District 70
Party	Candidate	Votes	%	±%
Democratic	Gretchen Bangert	7,225	74.42%	+3.16
Libertarian	Dustin Coffell	2,484	25.58%	+25.58
Total votes		9,709	100.00%	
