= Eric Woods (politician) =

American politician

Member of the Missouri House of Representatives from the 18th district
- Incumbent
- Assumed office January 4, 2023
- Preceded by: Wes Rogers

Personal details
- Party: Democratic
- Education: University of Missouri
- Website: https://www.woodsformissouri.com/

Eric Woods is an American politician serving as a Democratic member of the Missouri House of Representatives, representing the state's 18th House district.

In addition to being a legislator, Woods works as a regulatory and compliance manager focusing on data privacy and security.
