= Ursuline Academy (Illinois) =

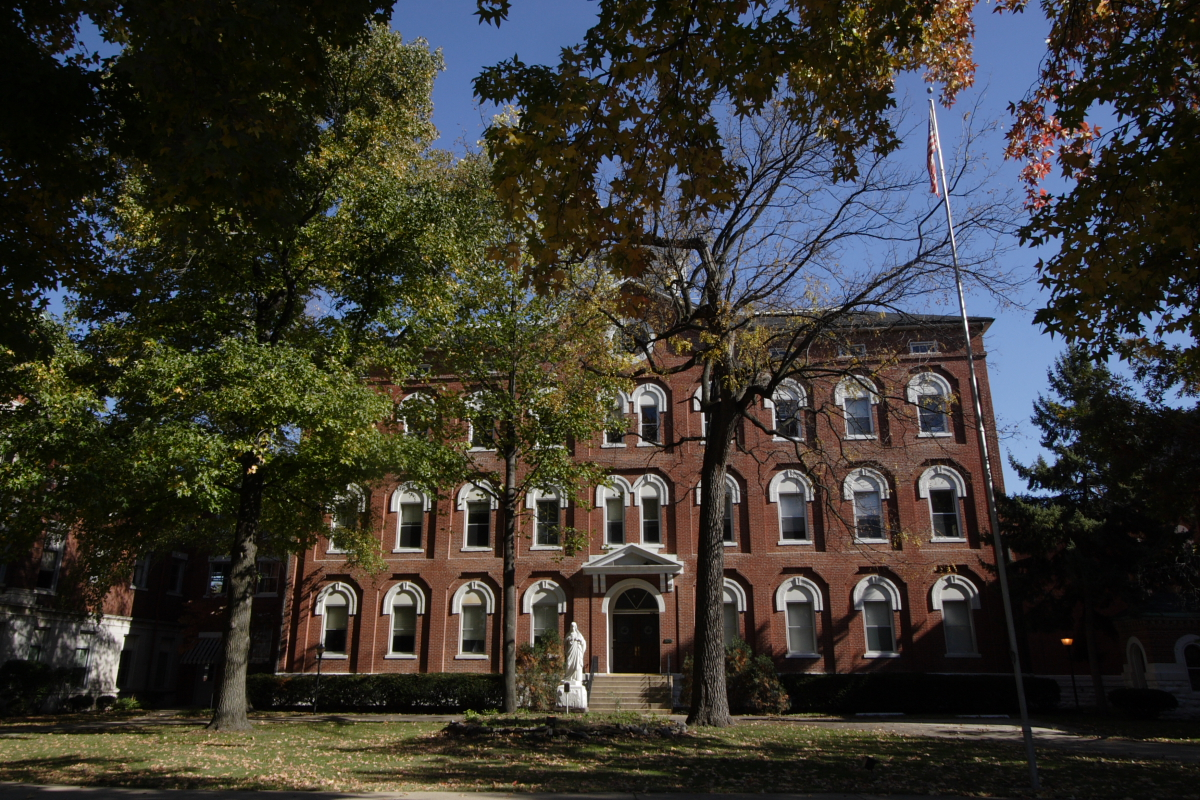

Location
- 1400 North Fifth; Springfield, Illinois; USA; 39.8192°N 89.6493°W

Information
- Type: Private secondary
- Denomination: Roman Catholic
- Established: 1857
- Closed: 2007
- Principal: John Stimler (at close)
- Grades: 9–12
- Colors: Red and White
- Newspaper: U Scribble

Ursuline Academy was a Catholic high school in Springfield, Illinois that operated from 1857 until 2007. In its final years, it was affiliated with Springfield College in Illinois (SCI). Ursuline Academy billed itself as a college preparatory school. One offshoot of its partnership with SCI was a program which allowed high school students to simultaneously receive high school and college credit for courses.

== History ==
Ursuline Academy was founded in 1857 by Mother Mary Joseph Wolfe, with its location at 5th and Mason streets. The academy moved to its current and final location on 5th Street, north of Eastman, in 1867. The school originally opened as an all-girls school. Enrollment was so low by the late 1970s that the academy had no choice but to become co-educational in 1981.

The Ursuline Sisters established SCI in 1929 on the property owned by the academy. On January 15, 2003, Benedictine University, located in Lisle, Illinois, entered into a partnership with SCI. Over the next four years, the Ursuline Sisters withdrew from the academy, moving out of the convent completely in 2005.

== Closing ==
On May 11, 2007, the SCI-BU (Benedictine University) Board of Directors made the decision to close Ursuline at the end of the 2006–2007 school year. They notified Ursuline Principal, John Stimler, the following day, and the students were then notified on May 14.

== After closing ==
The buildings were put on an historic preservation list, Landmarks Illinois, due to the efforts of alumna Sarah Jones in 2008.
