= Wes Rogers =

American politician

Member of the Missouri House of Representatives from the 18th district
- In office January 9, 2019 – January 4, 2023
- Preceded by: Lauren Arthur
- Succeeded by: Eric Woods

Personal details
- Born: July 24, 1982 (age 44)
- Party: Democratic

Wes McCreary Rogers (born July 24, 1982) is an American politician who is a member of the City Council of Kansas City for the 2nd district, which covers most neighborhoods in Kansas City’s Northland south of Barry Road. Rogers is also a former Democratic member of the Missouri General Assembly from the 18th House district.

== Career ==
Rogers won his first seat in the November 2018 general election. He secured fifty-seven percent of the vote while his closest rival, Republican Sarah Mills, secured forty-three percent.
