= Michael O'Donnell (Missouri politician) =

American politician

Missouri State Commissioner of Securities
- Incumbent
- Assumed office January 15, 2025
- Appointed by: Denny Hoskins
- Preceded by: Douglas Jacoby

Member of the Missouri House of Representatives from the 95th district
- In office January 2019 – January 15, 2025
- Preceded by: Marsha Haefner
- Succeeded by: Bob Mahacek (elect)

Personal details
- Born: June 17, 1968 (age 58) St. Louis, Missouri, U.S.
- Party: Republican
- Spouse: Lisa O'Donnell
- Children: 2
- Education: University of Missouri–St. Louis (BS); American Military University (MS)
- Occupation: Politician

Military service
- Branch/service: United States Navy
- Unit: United States Navy Reserve

Michael A. O'Donnell (born June 17, 1968) is an American politician who served as a member of the Missouri House of Representatives from 2019 to 2025, representing the 95th district. Elected in November 2018, he assumed office in January 2019.

== Early life and education ==
O'Donnell was born in St. Louis and raised in Oakville, Missouri. After graduating from Lindbergh High School, he earned a Bachelor of Science degree in business administration from the University of Missouri–St. Louis and a Master of Science in military strategic intelligence from American Military University.

== Career ==
O'Donnell served as an intelligence officer in the United States Navy Reserve. During his tenure, he was deployed to Iraq and Afghanistan. O'Donnell later worked as a municipal bond trader for Wells Fargo. O'Donnell was in New York City during the September 11 attacks and was scheduled to attend a business meeting on the 104th floor of the World Trade Center. O'Donnell was elected to the Missouri House of Representatives in November 2018 and assumed office in January 2019. He also serves as vice chair of the House Financial Institutions Committee.

O'Donnell resigned from the Missouri House in January 2025 after being appointed as state commissioner of securities by Missouri Secretary of State Denny Hoskins.

== Electoral history ==
Missouri House of Representatives Primary Election, August 7, 2018, District 95
Party	Candidate	Votes	%	±%
Republican	Michael O'Donnell	2,114	51.35%	
Republican	Joe Patterson	2,003	48.65%	
Total votes		4,117	100.00%	

Missouri House of Representatives Election, November 6, 2018, District 95
Party	Candidate	Votes	%	±%
Republican	Michael O'Donnell	10,418	57.96%	
Democratic	Mike Walter	7,555	42.04%	
Total votes		17,983	100.00%	

Missouri House of Representatives Election, November 3, 2020, District 95
Party	Candidate	Votes	%	±%
Republican	Michael O'Donnell	12,691	59.26%	+1.30
Democratic	Ann Zimpfer	8,726	40.74%	−1.30
Total votes		21,417	100.00%	

Missouri House of Representatives Election, November 8, 2022, District 95
Party	Candidate	Votes	%	±%
Republican	Michael O'Donnell	9,809	58.66%	−0.60
Democratic	Ann Zimpfer	6,914	41.34%	+0.60
Total votes		16,723	100.00%	
