= Bob Mahacek =

American politician

Member-elect of the Missouri House of Representatives from the 95th district
- Assuming office January 6, 2027
- Succeeding: Michael O'Donnell

Personal details
- Party: Republican
- Website: Campaign website

Bob Mahacek is an American politician of the Missouri Republican Party who is the representative-elect for the 95th district in the Missouri House of Representatives. He was elected in the 2026 general election. He was previously a candidate in 2022. He is a small business owner.
