= Ashley Bland Manlove =

American politician (born 1986)

Member of the Missouri House of Representatives from the 26th district
- In office January 9, 2019 – January 8, 2025
- Preceded by: Gail McCann Beatty
- Succeeded by: Tiffany Price

Personal details
- Born: April 28, 1986 (age 39)
- Party: Democratic

Ashley Jade Bland Manlove (born April 28, 1986) is a Democratic former member of the Missouri General Assembly, having represented the state's 26th house district from 2019 to 2025.

== Career ==
Manlove won the Democratic primary election on August 7, 2018, garnering 77% of the vote in a field of three candidates. She was elected unopposed on November 6, 2018.

== Electoral history ==
Missouri House of Representatives Primary Election, August 7, 2018, District 26
Party	Candidate	Votes	%	±%
Democratic	Ashley Bland Manlove	4,685	76.48%	
Democratic	Edward Bell	1,006	16.42%	
Democratic	Dylan Burd	435	7.10%	
Total votes		6,126	100.00%	

Missouri House of Representatives Election, November 6, 2018, District 26
Party	Candidate	Votes	%	±%
Democratic	Ashley Bland Manlove	12,823	100.00%	
Total votes		12,823	100.00%	

Missouri House of Representatives Primary Election, August 4, 2020, District 26
Party	Candidate	Votes	%	±%
Democratic	Ashley Bland Manlove	5,158	81.82%	+5.34
Democratic	Jamie T. Braden	1,146	18.18%	n/a
Total votes		6,304	100.00%	

Missouri House of Representatives Election, November 3, 2020, District 26
Party	Candidate	Votes	%	±%
Democratic	Ashley Bland Manlove	15,201	100.00%	0.00
Total votes		15,201	100.00%	

Missouri House of Representatives Election, November 8, 2022, District 26
Party	Candidate	Votes	%	±%
Democratic	Ashley Bland Manlove	8,057	100.00%	0.00
Total votes		8,057	100.00%	

== Personal ==
Bland Manlove is a lesbian.
