= Nate Tate =

American politician (born 1979)

Member of the Missouri House of Representatives from the 119th district
- In office January 4, 2017 – January 4, 2023
- Preceded by: Dave Hinson
- Succeeded by: Brad Banderman

Personal details
- Born: January 12, 1979 (age 47) Washington, Missouri, U.S.
- Party: Republican
- Education: Fontbonne University

Nate Tate (born January 12, 1979) is an American politician who served in the Missouri House of Representatives representing the 119th district from 2017 to 2023.
