= Herman Morse =

American politician (1949–2026)

Member of the Missouri House of Representatives from the 151st district
- In office 2017–2025
- Succeeded by: Steve Jordan

Personal details
- Born: September 15, 1949 near Avert, Missouri, U.S.
- Died: November 3, 2026 (aged 77)
- Party: Republican
- Spouse: Sharon
- Children: 2
- Profession: Educator

Herman Earl Morse (September 15, 1949 – November 3, 2026) was an American politician. He was a member of the Missouri House of Representatives from the 151st District from 2017 to 2025. Morse was a member of the Republican party. He was a life long resident of Missouri.

== Early life and career ==
Morse graduated first in his class at Bloomfield High School in 1967. He went on to Southeast Missouri State University, where he completed a bachelor's degree in English Education with a French minor. Seeking to build further on his language skills, he joined the United States Air Force and served as a Mandarin linguist based in Taipei, Taiwan.

After receiving an honorable discharge as the Vietnam War drew to a close, Morse came back to Southeast Missouri State to earn a master's degree in remedial reading. He went on to add a second master’s in counseling and a specialist degree in educational administration.

== Death ==
Morse died from a cardiac arrest on November 3, 2026, at the age of 77.
