= Dan Shaul =

American politician

Member of the Missouri House of Representatives from the 113th district
- In office 2015–2023
- Succeeded by: Phil Amato

Personal details
- Born: December 13, 1968 (age 57) St. Louis, Missouri, U.S.
- Party: Republican
- Spouse: Kim
- Children: 3
- Profession: director of the Missouri Grocers Association

Dan Shaul (born December 13, 1968) is an American politician. He is a former member of the Missouri House of Representatives, serving from 2015 to 2023. He is a member of the Republican party.
