= Jered Taylor =

American politician (born 1984)

Member of the Missouri House of Representatives from the 139th district
- In office January 7, 2015 – January 4, 2023
- Preceded by: Kevin Elmer
- Succeeded by: Bob Titus

Personal details
- Born: February 1, 1984 (age 42) Nixa, Missouri, U.S.
- Party: Republican

Jered Taylor (born February 1, 1984) is an American politician who served in the Missouri House of Representatives, representing the 139th district from 2015 to 2023.
