= Darrell Atchison =

American politician

Member of the Missouri House of Representatives from the 153rd district
- In office January 6, 2021 – 2025
- Preceded by: Jeff Shawan
- Succeeded by: Keith Elliott

Personal details
- Born: St. Louis, Missouri, U.S.
- Party: Republican
- Education: Three Rivers College (AS); Tarkio College (BS)

Military service
- Branch/service: Missouri National Guard
- Years of service: 1981–2004

Darrell Atchison is an American politician and businessman who was a member of the Missouri House of Representatives from the 153rd district. Elected in November 2020, he assumed office on January 6, 2021.

== Early life and education ==
Atchison was born in St. Louis and moved to Williamsville, Missouri, at the age of 12. After graduating from Poplar Bluff High School, he earned an associate degree from Three Rivers College and a Bachelor of Science in business from Tarkio College.

== Career ==
From 1981 to 2004, Atchison served as a maintenance and logistics officer in the Missouri National Guard, retiring with the rank of major. He was also the founder and president of Four A Enterprises, manufacturing and assembly business. Since 2008, he has worked as a financial representative for Modern Woodmen of America. Atchison was elected to the Missouri House of Representatives in November 2020 and assumed office on January 6, 2021.
