= Lee's Summit, Missouri =

City in the United States

- City
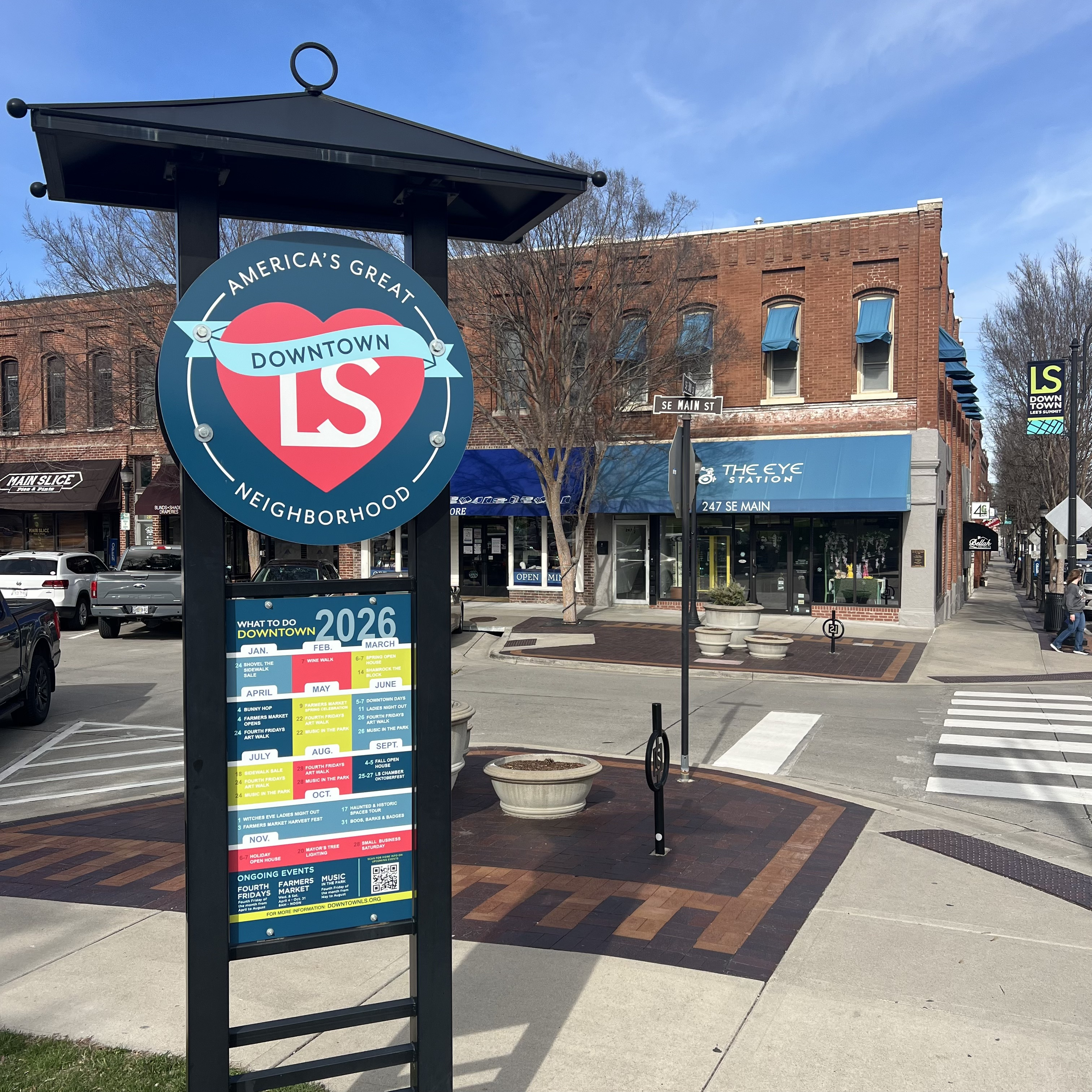
- Downtown Lee's Summit

- Flag

- Location within Jackson County and Missouri
- Coordinates: 38°55′02″N 94°22′54″W
- Country: United States
- State: Missouri
- Counties: Jackson, Cass
- Founded: 1860s
- Incorporated: October 28, 1865
- Named for: Pleasant Lea

Government
  - Type: Council–manager
  - Mayor: Beto Lopez
  - City manager: Mark Dunning

Area
  - Total: 65.91 sq mi (170.7 km^{2})
  - Land: 63.89 sq mi (165.5 km^{2})
  - Water: 2.02 sq mi (5.2 km^{2})
- Elevation: 1,028 ft (313 m)

Population (2020)
  - Total: 101,108
  - Estimate (2025): 107,514
  - Rank: 6th in Missouri; 305th in the United States
  - Density: 1,583/sq mi (611.0/km^{2})
- Time zone: UTC−6 (CST)
  - Summer (DST): UTC−5 (CDT)
- ZIP Code: 64015, 64063, 64064, 64081, 64082, 64083, 64086
- Area code: 816, 975
- FIPS code: 29-41348
- GNIS ID: 2395669
- Website: cityofls.net

Lee's Summit is a city in Jackson and Cass counties in Missouri, United States. It is part of the Kansas City metropolitan area and is a suburb of Kansas City, about 20 miles (32 kilometers) to the southeast. As of the 2020 census, the population was 101,108, making Lee's Summit the sixth most populous city in both Missouri and the Kansas City metropolitan area. It is part of the Wooded Osage Plains region, characterized by rolling topography.

In 1865, the town was incorporated as Strother, remaining so until it was renamed Lee’s Summit three years later. Lee's Summit began as an agricultural community and persisted as such until the mid-twentieth century. Upon the conclusion of World War II, with new highway infrastructure and an increased desire for single family housing, the city began to rapidly suburbanize and grow in population, transitioning into a commuter suburb of Kansas City. The city's period of population and territorial growth lasted through the remainder of the twentieth century.

The Lee's Summit public school district has consistently ranked among the city’s top employers, alongside federal government offices, healthcare facilities, and retail centers. Most residents, however, commute to other cities for work, often other nearby suburbs. The city retains its historic downtown and train station, while now also encompassing suburban developments, several human-made lake reservoirs, and numerous parks. The city's relatively large size and location near major highways have made it a principal suburb of the Kansas City metropolitan area.

== History ==
=== Early history ===
The region encompassing present-day Lee’s Summit has been inhabited by humans for at least 10,000 years. Archaeological evidence suggests continuous human occupation within the present-day boundaries of Lee’s Summit dating back roughly 9,000 years. For example, archaeologists have discovered stone arrowheads characteristic of the Dalton tradition in Lee's Summit, indicating that humans occupied the area at least 9,000 years ago. (Note: Schmits et al. says of site 23JA160, "early occupations are indicated by the recovery of Dalton points". Schmits et al., p. 10, figure 3. shows that site 23JA160 is located in Lee's Summit, near the intersection of U.S. Route 40 and S Powell Avenue.) At another site in the city, arrowheads and ceramics characteristic of the Kansas City Hopewell culture were discovered, indicating that humans had temporary campsites in the area roughly 2,000 years ago. (Note: Schmits et al. says of site 23JA115, "Projectile point styles from these sites are predominantly expanding-stemmed forms characteristic of the middle Kansas City Hopewell period. Ceramics are plain-surfaced and more typical of late Kansas City Hopewell ceramics." Schmits et al., p. 10, figure 3. shows that site 23JA115 is located in Lee's Summit, near the intersection of Lee's Summit Road and NW Anderson Drive.) Stone tools and organic remains suggest that temporary campsites in what is now Lee's Summit were used to hunt for deer, bison, and other small mammals, roughly 700 years ago. (Note: Schmits et al. says of site 23JA43, "The lithic assemblage indicates that the site represents a residential extractive camp focused on the manufacture and use of chipped stone tools for hunting, butchering and hide preparation. Faunal remains indicate that subsistence was based on white-tailed deer. Bison and a number of small mammals such as raccoon, woodchuck and cottontail were of lesser importance." Schmits et al., p. 10, figure 3. shows that site 23JA43 is located in Lee's Summit, near Lee's Summit Road and NW Anderson Drive.)

At the time of first contact between indigenous Missourians and Europeans in the 1670s, present-day Lee’s Summit fell within the northwestern portion of the territory occupied by the Little Osage people. Other nearby groups included the Missourias to the north and the Kanzas to the west. The area was likely used as hunting grounds by the Osage.

In 1682, René-Robert Cavelier, Sieur de La Salle claimed the Mississippi River basin for France as the territory of Louisiana, which included present-day Lee's Summit. In 1762, France secretly ceded the territory to Spain by the Treaty of Fontainebleau.

=== 19th century ===
In 1803, the United States acquired the territory that includes the area of present-day Lee's Summit through France in the Louisiana Purchase.

The Osage, weakened by encroaching indigenous groups and American settlers from the east, and under pressure from the United States, ceded the last of their territory in Missouri by treaty in 1825. This included present-day Lee's Summit.

In 1827, when commissioners were deciding where to establish the seat of Jackson County, they described southern Jackson County as "useless" prairie. At that time, southern Jackson County, including present-day Lee’s Summit, was the rural counterpart to the increasingly urban north county. Beginning in the 1830s, Americans from eastern slave states came to settle what is now Lee's Summit, attracted by "its rolling prairie, fertile soil, numerous streams, and stands of timber." In 1844, William Bullitt Howard, the eventual founder of Lee's Summit, arrived from Kentucky with his family and slaves. Pleasant John Graves Lea, the eventual namesake of the city, was a resident of the area according to the 1850 census. By 1853, settlers had purchased all of the land that now constitutes Lee's Summit from the federal government. In 1860, Prairie Township was incorporated in Jackson County, and the community which would later become Lee's Summit was the largest in the new township.

Congress passed the Kansas-Nebraska Act in 1854, thereby starting the Missouri-Kansas Border War. Many of the residents of Prairie Township held pro-slavery attitudes, and some even fought in pro-slavery bands of guerrillas. The Little Blue River valley was an important place of refuge for these guerrilla forces. (Note: Significant portions of Lee's Summit and the Little Blue River valley overlap. See, Shortridge, p. 3, Map 1.) Howard, the eventual founder of Lee's Summit, was arrested by a Union officer and then spent one month in jail in 1859. In July 1862, Irvin Walley, a captain in the Union army, shot and killed Henry Washington Younger, an early settler of Lee's Summit. Less than two months later, anti-slavery guerrillas from Kansas killed Dr. Lea in his home. After these men's deaths, their sons joined up with William Quantrill's pro-Confederate gang and participated in the Lawrence Massacre. Most notable among them was Cole Younger, a life-long resident of Lee's Summit and outlaw who would become "Jesse James's right hand." In response to the Lawrence Massacre, Union General Thomas Ewing, Jr. issued General Order No. 11 in 1863, forcing all residents outside Union-occupied towns in Jackson County to prove allegiance to the Union within fifteen days or else evacuate. This led to the desertion of present-day Lee’s Summit, as many residents fled back to their homes in the east. Union troops then burned and razed many of the abandoned farms.

=== Incorporation ===
A map plat of Lee's Summit c. 1877, showing the Missouri Pacific Railroad depot and William Bullitt Howard's land

Upon the end of the American Civil War in 1865, William Bullitt Howard returned to his home in Jackson County. He reached a deal with the Missouri Pacific Railroad Company to plat a town of 70 acres (0.28 km^{2}) along the path of the tracks south of Kansas City and on the way to St. Louis. Lots in the center of the town would be reserved for a train depot. The town was founded as “Strother” in October 1865, named after the family name of Howard’s wife.

In 1868, the town was officially renamed "Lee's Summit." A flier from 1865 refers to the town as "Strother, formerly known as Lee's Summit," indicating that the town was colloquially known as Lee's Summit prior to its founding by Howard. (Note: Also see a petition from the Missouri Pacific Railroad Company filed in St. Louis County and published in the December 24, 1864 edition of The Daily Missouri Democrat which refers to "Lee's Summit".) It is very likely that Lee's Summit was named in honor of Pleasant John Graves Lea, who was killed nearby in 1862. Workers for the Missouri Pacific Railroad may have painted "Lees Summit" on the side of a boxcar to serve as a temporary depot in the city.

The spelling “Lee” instead of "Lea" is assumed to be an error, while “Summit” refers to the city’s location at the highest point along the railroad between Kansas City and St. Louis. In 1969, Howard’s grandson disputed this account, claiming the town was named for Confederate General Robert E. Lee and that the story about Dr. Lea was a cover. Local historians, however, have dismissed this claim.

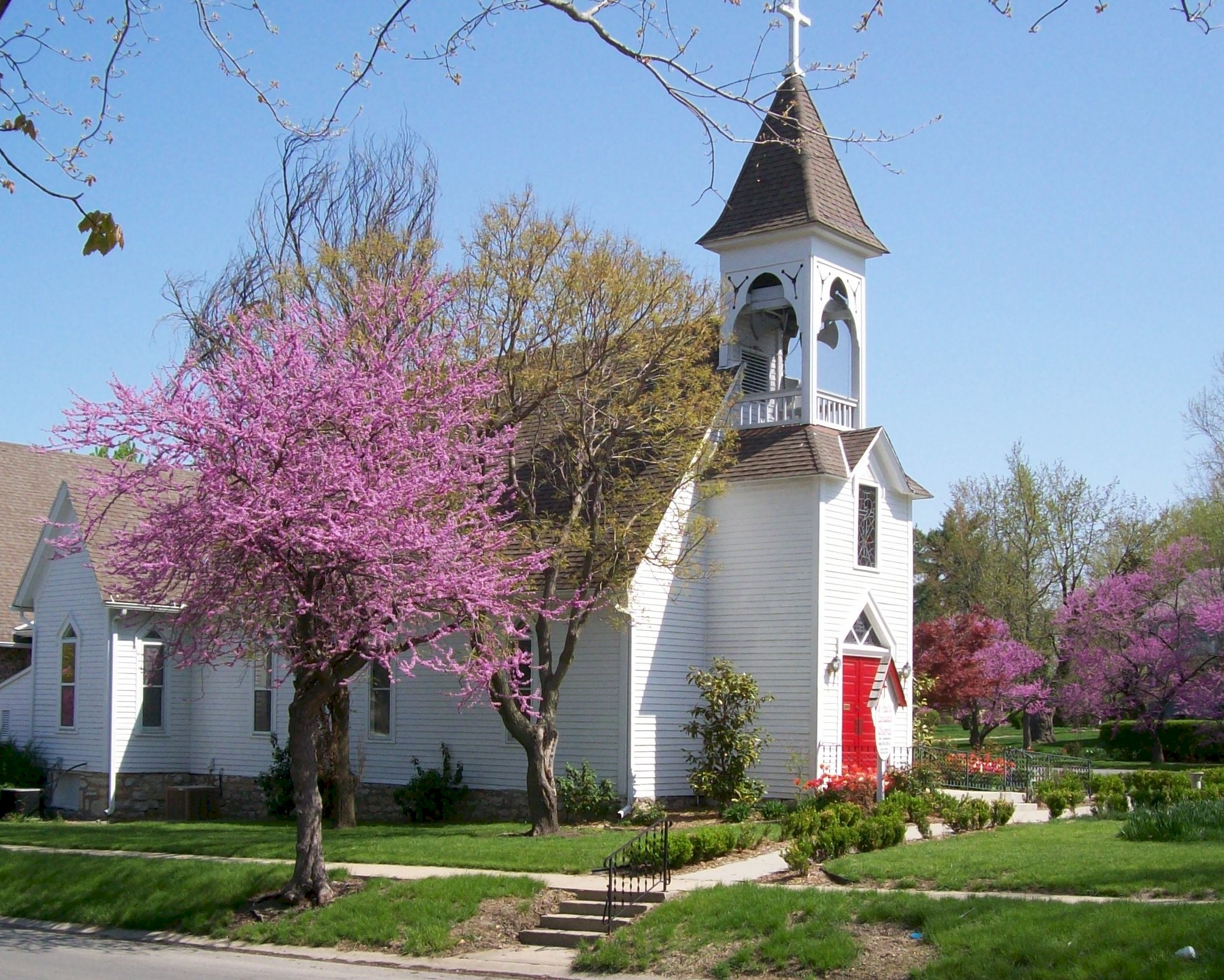
Saint Paul's Episcopal Church, built in 1884

In 1877, Lee's Summit was incorporated as a fourth-class city and by then was the "commercial center for the surrounding agricultural community." The primary occupation in Lee's Summit was farming—particularly hogs, corn, and fruit orchards. In 1885, a fire destroyed much of downtown Lee's Summit.

=== 20th century to 21st century ===
In the early 20th century, Lee's Summit persisted as a small, rural agricultural community. The city's population growth was stunted by its proximity to Kansas City and Independence. Still, the city boundaries were expanded in 1905, and some residential development occurred in the 1900s and 1910s. Property development slowed and then ceased in Lee's Summit during the 1920s and through the Great Depression and World War II.

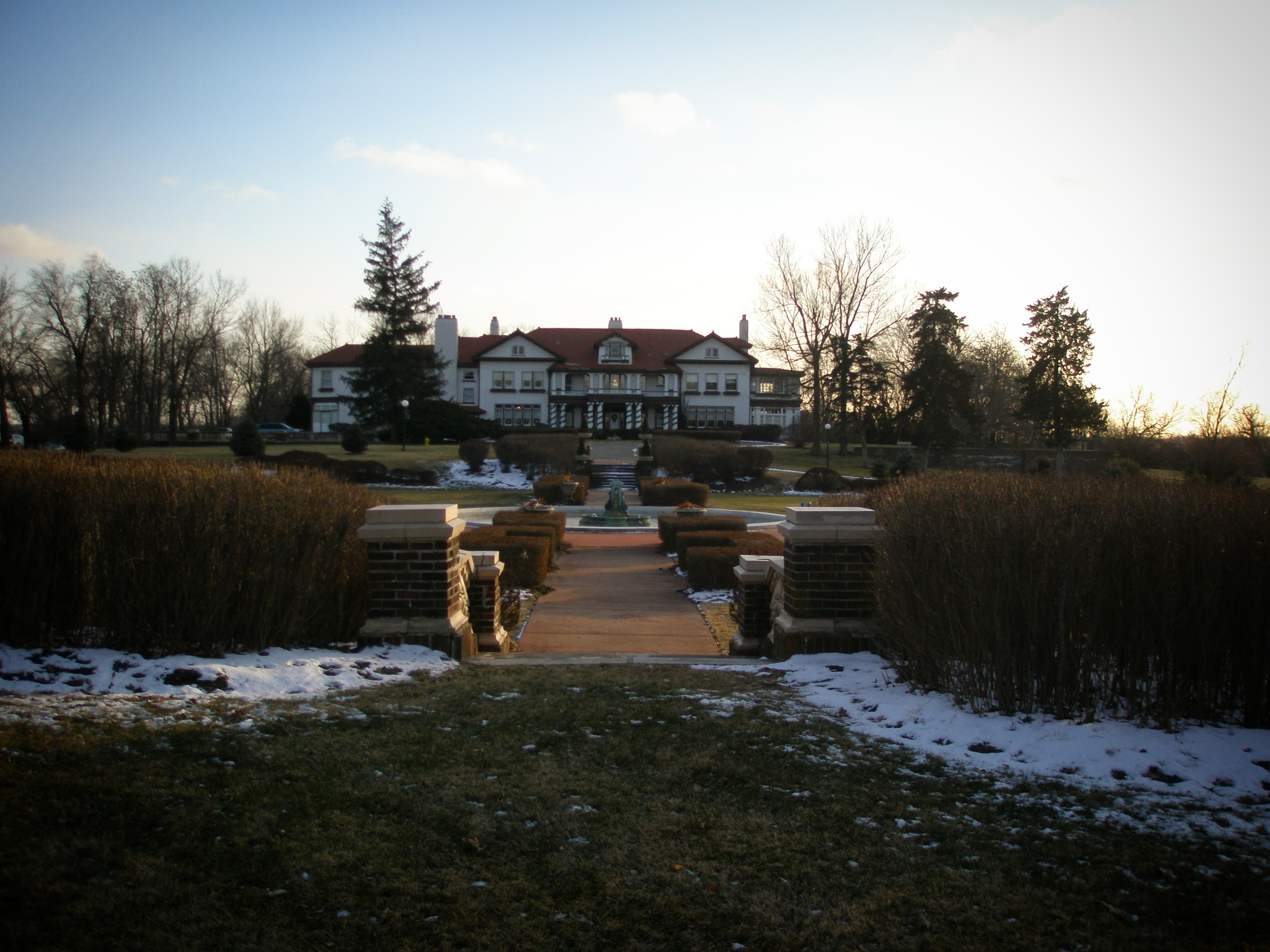
Longview Mansion, built in 1914 as part of Longview Farm

In 1912, lumber baron and Kansas City civic leader Robert A. Long began building his 1,780 acre (7.2 km^{2}) estate, Longview Farm, much of which lay in southwestern Lee's Summit. It took eighteen months to complete with the work of over two thousand laborers. At the time of building, it was considered the largest construction project in the country. At the time of completion, the farm employed over two hundred people who lived on the property. Long's daughter, Loula Long Combs, made a lifelong career of raising champion show horses on the farm. In 2004, part of the farm was developed into the New Longview neighborhood.

In March 1922, at the Veterans Memorial Hall in downtown Lee's Summit (now the Third Street Social restaurant), Harry S. Truman announced he was running for election as County Court judge of the eastern district of Jackson County—the first political candidacy of his career. (Note: According to McCullough, the County Court judge was not a judicial position, but an administrative one involving county government spending and contracting. The eastern district included towns such as Independence, Grandview, and Lee's Summit. Mike Pendergast, brother of Kansas City political boss Tom Pendergast, had "responsibility for" this position.) Years later, in 1956, Truman said of his first political speech that it "was a flop for me." "I was more scared then than I was at any time later, even when I was on the front in the first world war in France.” During the primary campaign, Truman briefly pursued Ku Klux Klan membership, believing it would help him secure more votes, in part because of prominent cross burnings in Lee's Summit. Two years later, during his reelection campaign, he faced public opposition from Jackson County treasurer and Lee's Summit mayor, Todd George, who may have been affiliated with the Klan. (Note: McCullough refers to George as "the local head Klansman." George's family disputes this characterization, saying that they "had independent research conducted, and it found there is no evidence of any such affiliation" and that "in a 1959 memoir, George stated he wanted nothing to do with the KKK." The editorial board of The Kansas City Star points out, however, that "[w]hile reports that George was a local leader of the Ku Klux Klan were a matter of some debate, his belief in a racist ideology was indisputable." See Dicus, Todd C. (July 17, 2020). "Discussion about Todd George's name on Lee's Summit roads requires context". The Kansas City Star. Retrieved May 5, 2025. See also, "'A memorial to hatred': Lee's Summit should rename streets honoring racist former mayor". The Kansas City Star. July 16, 2020. Retrieved May 5, 2025.) Truman claimed that the Klan threatened to kill him, and in response he disrupted a Klan rally in Lee's Summit, shaming the roughly one thousand attendees for their anti-Catholic and antisemitic views. In 1928, Truman, as the presiding judge of the County Court, undertook the construction of many roads connecting Lee's Summit to the rest of the metro area, as well as a hospital just outside the city (later named Truman Medical Center-East, now University Health Lakewood Medical Center).

At the end of World War II in 1945, there was enormous demand for single-family housing across the United States. This demand, combined with the recently built roads, Federal Housing Administration policy, and the G.I. Bill, spurred the rapid suburbanization of Lee's Summit. Developers began building entire neighborhoods in the city but were interrupted from 1950 to 1953 by the Korean War. After the war, however, the number of people living in and around Lee's Summit grew significantly. According to the 1950 census, about 2,500 people lived in Lee's Summit; by 1960, the population had grown to over 8,000. This population growth resulted from white Kansas City residents relocating to the suburbs and from large annexations by the city. By the late 1950s, Lee's Summit was no longer an agricultural community, but instead a commuter suburb—nearly sixty percent of residents worked outside the city, and farming had all but disappeared.

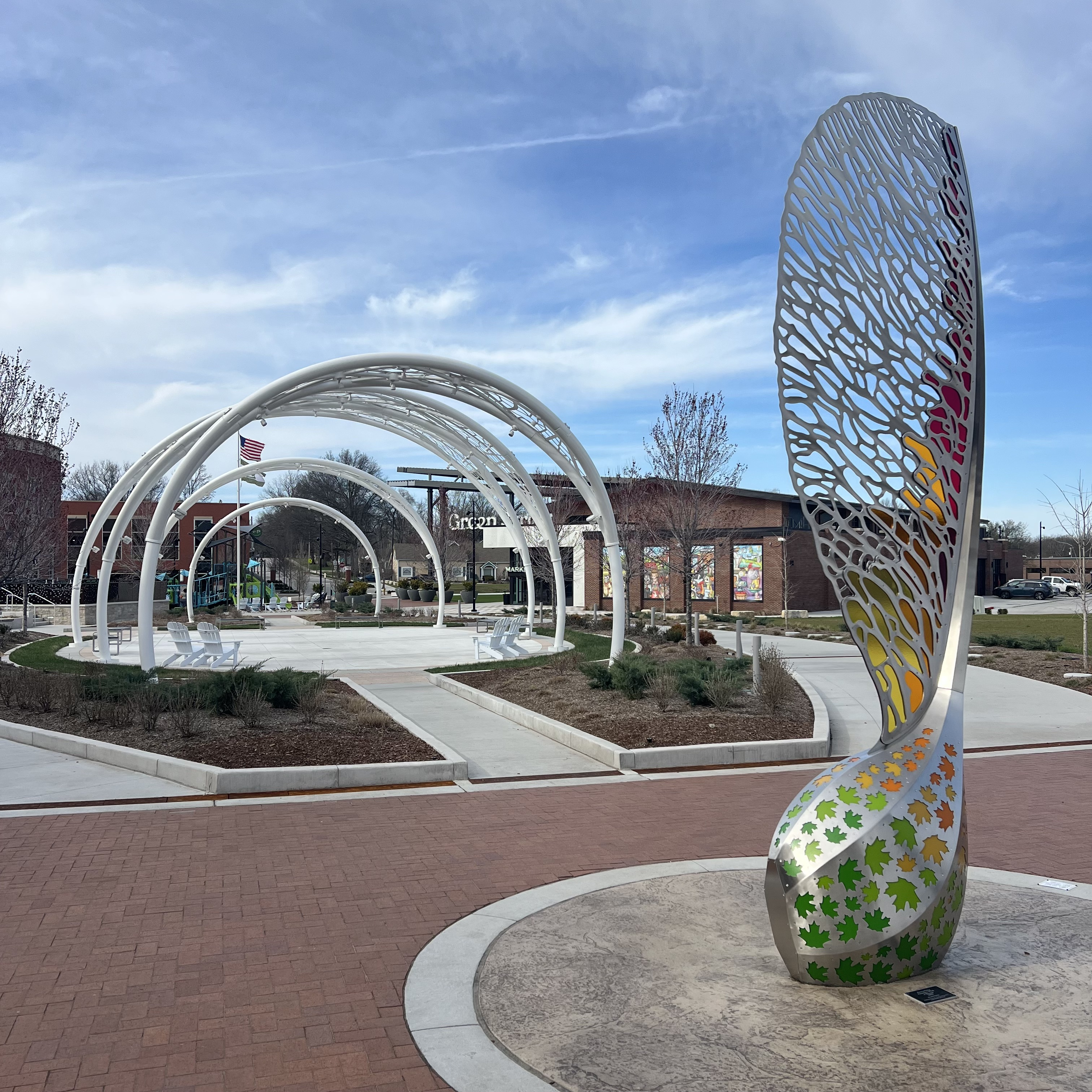
Sculpture with Green Street event space in the background

In 1961, Western Electric opened a factory in Lee’s Summit, and within a year it employed about three thousand people. The Western Electric plant, which was in operation until 2002, contributed to the city's growth by providing a tax base for further annexations and a well-funded public school district. Rapid growth persisted through the 1970s and 1980s, with the city’s population exceeding 46,000 by 1990. John Knox Village, a long-term care facility completed in 1970, has remained one of the city's top employers. The damming of the Little Blue River in 1985 created Longview Lake, home to amenities including the Fred Arbanas Golf Course and MCC-Longview Community College. In 2001, the Summit Woods Crossing retail center was developed in Lee’s Summit, followed by the construction of the Summit Fair retail center nearby in 2007. Green Street, an event space in downtown Lee’s Summit and “home to the Farmers Market, outdoor performance area, public art, gathering spaces, and an immersive playground,” opened in 2025.

Sociologists Douglas Massey and Nancy Denton classified the Kansas City metro area as “hypersegregated” between white and Black residents as recently as the 1980s. Lee's Summit, as a second-ring white-flight suburb, contributed to patterns of racial segregation in Kansas City and its outlying region. The government policies which suburbanized the city in the post-war period excluded Black people, effectively making Lee's Summit available only to white people. The Federal Housing Administration even encouraged suburban developers to include legally unenforceable racially restrictive deed covenants with the sale of their homes. According to sociologist Kevin Fox Gotham, residents of Lee's Summit successfully resisted efforts to locate federally subsidized housing in the suburb—meant to integrate the metro area—in the 1970s and into the 1990s. In 1978, officials and students from the Kansas City public school district filed a federal lawsuit against the Lee’s Summit school district and several other suburban districts, alleging racial discrimination. The District Court dismissed the case against the school district, finding insufficient evidence that officials had intentionally preserved school segregation. Although the Lee's Summit school district was removed from the case, the District Court went on to order extensive improvements to Kansas City schools, pay raises for employees, and the creation of a magnet school system aimed at addressing the metro-area school segregation by attracting suburban students to inner city schools. In the 1995 case Missouri v. Jenkins, the Supreme Court of the United States held that the Missouri government was no longer required to fund the magnet school program, effectively ending the improvements and pay raises.

== Geography ==
Lee's Summit is located near Missouri's western border with Kansas and is in the northern half of the state. The city borders Kansas City to the west and northwest, Independence to the north, unincorporated Jackson County to the east, Greenwood to the southeast, and Lake Winnebago as well as unincorporated Cass County to the south. It is a suburb in the Kansas City, MO-KS Metropolitan Statistical Area.

Lee's Summit is part of the Wooded Osage Plains ecoregion, a "non-glaciated undulating plain with smooth, low, limestone escarpments and small areas of exposed bedrock." Characteristic geology includes limestone, sandstone, and shale strata, which produce a "rolling topography." The natural vegetation is "a mosaic of oak-hickory woodland and bluestem prairie."

Lee's Summit resides partially within, and to the south and east of, the Little Blue River valley. The north-westernmost boundary of the city follows the course of the Little Blue River. There are six major human-made reservoirs in and around Lee's Summit: Lake Jacomo (1959), Lake Winnebago (1960s), Raintree Lake (1970s), Lakewood Lakes (1976), Longview Lake (1986), and Blue Springs Lake (1989). Bethany Falls, a 20-foot-thick limestone formation, runs underneath Lee's Summit, resulting in bluffs near Longview Lake.

Downtown Lee's Summit, a roughly ten-block by ten-block area, lies at the center of the city. Businesses occupy the core of downtown and are surrounded predominantly by single family housing. Stretching to the eastern and western boundaries of the city are neighborhoods composed almost exclusively of single family housing. Lining the edges of Interstate 470, U.S. Route 50, and Missouri Route 291 are commercial, industrial, and mixed use areas. North of downtown, where Route 291 meets Interstate 470, lies the Lee's Summit Municipal Airport. The land immediately to the north of this middle stretch of the city is agricultural, as is the land immediately to the south. Neighborhoods of single family housing occupy the northernmost and southernmost portions of the city.

=== Climate ===
Lee's Summit experiences a four-season humid continental climate (Köppen climate classification Dfa) with cold days and nights during the winter, and hot days and muggy nights during the summer. No physical features obstruct the flow of air, allowing moist currents from the Gulf of Mexico, dry currents from the semiarid southwest, and cold polar continental currents to interact and affect the weather in the area. This causes the weather to be highly variable, sometimes producing tornadoes and storms. Spring is the season when variation is the highest. Spring is also characterized by high precipitation and moderate temperatures. Summer has warm to hot temperatures and is humid. Precipitation is also high during the summer. Fall has mild days and cool nights, with low precipitation. Winters are dry and moderately cold.

Climate data for Lee's Summit Municipal Airport (Note: Data used to calculate the average daily high temperatures, the average daily low temperatures, and the overall daily average temperatures of each month are from the Lee's Summit Municipal Airport (1991 to 2020).) and James A. Reed Memorial Wildlife Area (Note: Record high temperatures, record low temperatures, and the data used to calculate the mean monthly high temperatures, the mean monthly low temperatures, the average monthly precipitation and snowfall, the average days with precipitation of each month, and the average days with snowfall of each month are from the James A. Reed Memorial Wildlife Area (1962 to 2011).)
Month	Jan	Feb	Mar	Apr	May	Jun	Jul	Aug	Sep	Oct	Nov	Dec	Year
Record high °F (°C)	73 (23)	80 (27)	87 (31)	91 (33)	91 (33)	103 (39)	108 (42)	107 (42)	107 (42)	95 (35)	82 (28)	73 (23)	108 (42)
Mean maximum °F (°C)	59 (15)	65 (18)	77 (25)	83 (28)	88 (31)	93 (34)	98 (37)	98 (37)	92 (33)	85 (29)	73 (23)	63 (17)	99 (37)
Mean daily maximum °F (°C)	39.0 (3.9)	44.3 (6.8)	55.4 (13.0)	65.5 (18.6)	74.8 (23.8)	84.0 (28.9)	88.3 (31.3)	86.9 (30.5)	79.0 (26.1)	67.1 (19.5)	54.0 (12.2)	43.2 (6.2)	65.1 (18.4)
Daily mean °F (°C)	30.6 (−0.8)	35.1 (1.7)	45.4 (7.4)	55.5 (13.1)	65.3 (18.5)	74.7 (23.7)	79.0 (26.1)	77.3 (25.2)	69.0 (20.6)	57.2 (14.0)	45.1 (7.3)	34.7 (1.5)	55.7 (13.2)
Mean daily minimum °F (°C)	22.1 (−5.5)	25.9 (−3.4)	35.4 (1.9)	45.5 (7.5)	55.9 (13.3)	65.4 (18.6)	69.7 (20.9)	67.6 (19.8)	59.0 (15.0)	47.2 (8.4)	36.2 (2.3)	26.3 (−3.2)	46.3 (8.0)
Mean minimum °F (°C)	−3 (−19)	2 (−17)	13 (−11)	27 (−3)	39 (4)	50 (10)	56 (13)	54 (12)	40 (4)	28 (−2)	16 (−9)	2 (−17)	−6 (−21)
Record low °F (°C)	−19 (−28)	−15 (−26)	−5 (−21)	11 (−12)	28 (−2)	35 (2)	48 (9)	43 (6)	29 (−2)	7 (−14)	0 (−18)	−25 (−32)	−25 (−32)
Average precipitation inches (mm)	0.96 (24)	1.43 (36)	2.14 (54)	4.19 (106)	5.70 (145)	4.95 (126)	4.57 (116)	4.54 (115)	3.07 (78)	3.39 (86)	2.05 (52)	1.35 (34)	38.34 (972)
Average snowfall inches (cm)	2.7 (6.9)	2.8 (7.1)	1.3 (3.3)	0.2 (0.51)	0.0 (0.0)	0.0 (0.0)	0.0 (0.0)	0.0 (0.0)	0.0 (0.0)	0.0 (0.0)	0.5 (1.3)	1.8 (4.6)	4.5 (11)
Average precipitation days (≥ 0.01 in)	5	5	8	10	12	10	9	9	8	9	7	6	98
Average snowy days (≥ 0.1 in)	2	2	1	0	0	0	0	0	0	0	0	2	9
Source: NOAA

== Demographics ==
Historical population
Census	Pop.	Note	%±
1880	693		—
1890	1,369		97.5%
1900	1,453		6.1%
1910	1,455		0.1%
1920	1,467		0.8%
1930	2,035		38.7%
1940	2,263		11.2%
1950	2,554		12.9%
1960	8,267		223.7%
1970	16,230		96.3%
1980	28,741		77.1%
1990	46,418		61.5%
2000	70,700		52.3%
2010	91,364		29.2%
2020	101,108		10.7%
2025 (est.)	107,514		6.3%
United States Census Bureau

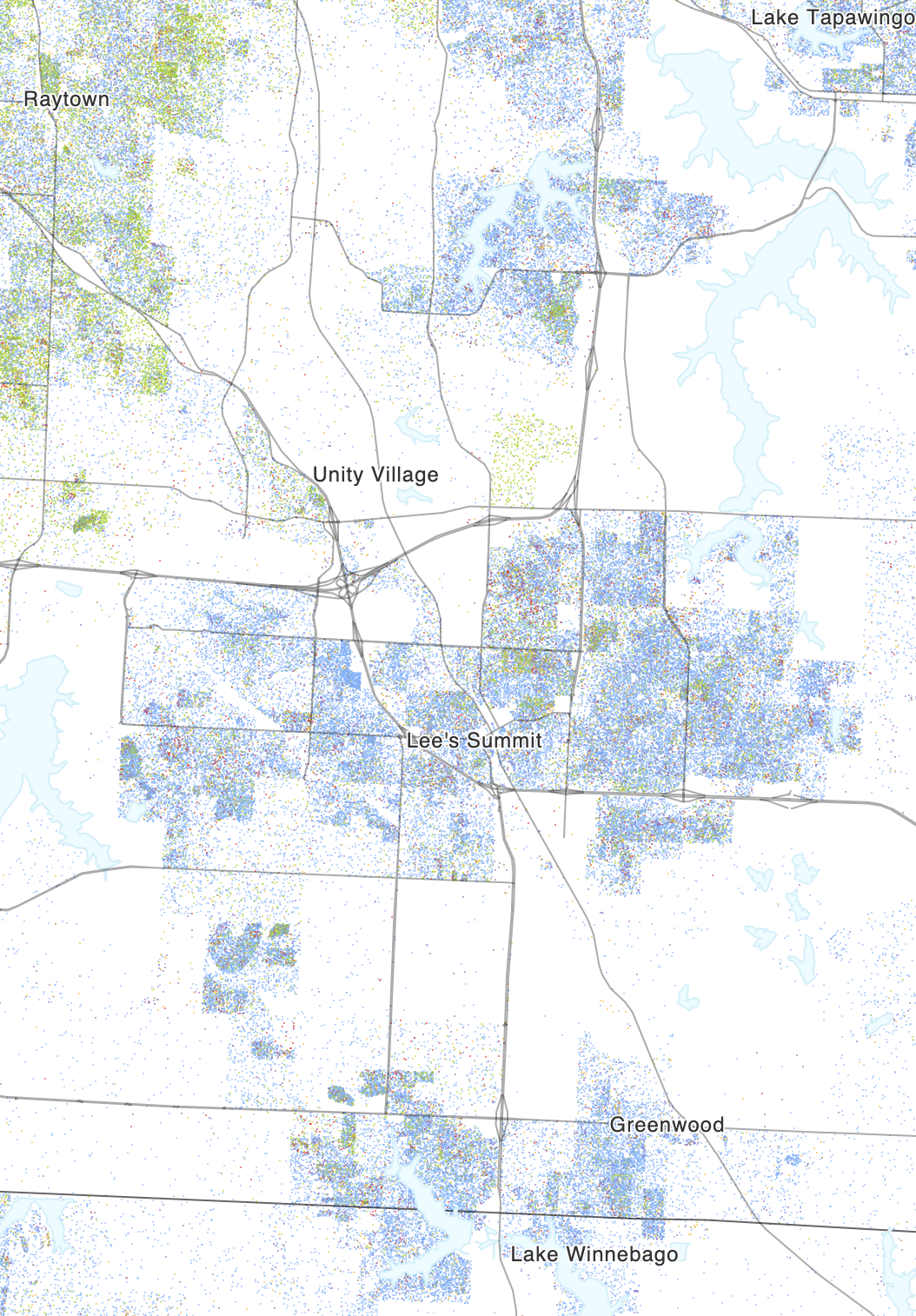
Map of racial distribution in Lee's Summit, 2020 U.S. census. Each dot is one person: ⬤ White ⬤ Black ⬤ Asian ⬤ Hispanic ⬤ Multiracial ⬤ Native American/Other

The population of Lee's Summit has been recorded by every United States census since 1880. After an initial increase from 1880 to 1890, the city's population remained mostly unchanged until the 1930 census. Lee's Summit began suburbanizing in the 1920s, resulting in population growth through the remaining decades of the twentieth century, especially after 1950. Population growth slowed but persisted from 2000 to 2020. (Note: See Historical population table.)

As of the 2020 United States census, there were 101,108 people, 37,664 households, and 27,316 families in Lee's Summit, with a population density of 1,582.3 inhabitants per square mile (611.0/km2). There were 39,495 housing units at an average density of 618.1 per square mile (238.7/km2). The racial composition (including Hispanics in the racial counts) was 78.6% (79,516) white, 8.9% (9,019) Black or African-American, 0.3% (321) American Indian and Alaska Native, 2.4% (2,401) Asian, 0.2% (147) Native Hawaiian and other Pacific Islander, 1.7% (1,714) from other races, and 7.9% (7,990) from two or more races. Hispanic or Latino of any race was 5.3% (5,398) of the population.

United States Census Bureau
Historical racial and ethnic composition (%) Non-Hispanic = NH	1980	1990	2000	2010	2020
White (NH)	97.4	96.3	91.9	83.7	77.1
Black or African American (NH)	1.0 (Note: The 1980 Census only refers to "Black" people.)	1.7 (Note: The 1990 Census only refers to "Black" people.)	3.4	8.2	8.8
American Indian and Alaska Native (NH)	0.2 (Note: Sum of American Indian, Eskimo, and Aleut populations.)	0.3 (Note: The 1990 Census refers to "American Indian, Eskimo, or Aleut" people.)	0.3	0.3	0.2
Asian (NH)	0.4 (Note: Sum of Japanese, Chinese, Filipino, Korean, Asian Indian, and Vietnamese populations.)	0.6 (Note: The 1990 Census groups non-Hispanic Asian and Pacific Islander people together.)	1.0	1.7	2.3
Native Hawaiian and other Pacific Islander (NH)	0.0 (Note: Sum of Hawaiian, Guamanian, and Samoan populations.)	x (Note: The 1990 Census groups non-Hispanic Asian and Pacific Islander people together.)	0.1	0.1	0.1
Other races (NH)	0.1	0.0	0.1	0.2	0.4
Two or more races (NH)	x (Note: The 1980 Census did not record people of two or more races.)	x (Note: The 1990 Census did not record people of two or more races.)	1.2	2.0	5.6
Hispanic or Latino (Note: The United States Census treats Hispanic and Latino as ethnicities, not races.)	0.9 (Note: The 1980 Census refers to people of "Spanish origin.")	1.0 (Note: The 1990 Census refers to people of "Hispanic origin.")	2.0	3.9	5.3

According to the 2024 American Community Survey estimates, 25.0% of the population was under 18-years-old, 31.8% was ages 18 to 44, 25.6% was ages 45 to 64, and 17.6% was over 64-years-old. The median age was 40.4-years-old. Among those ages 15 and older, 54.9% were married, which is 7.0 percentage points higher than the marital rate in Missouri and 5.9 percentage points higher than the rate for the United States overall. Among those ages 25 and older, 19.2% had obtained a graduate or professional degree, 33.7% only up to a bachelor's degree, 28.8% only up to an associate's degree (or some college), 16.0% only up to a high school diploma (or equivalent), and 2.3% less than a high school diploma. The rate of those obtaining less than a high school diploma is 5.7 percentage points lower than the rate for Missouri and 7.8 percentage points lower than the rate for the United States, while the rate of those obtaining a bachelor's degree is 13.6 percentage points higher than Missouri's and 11.6 percentage point higher than that of the United States.

The median income among those over 15-years-old was $51,030. This is $11,269 more than the median income in Missouri and $9,355 more than that for the United States. Again among those over 15-years-old, 29.5% made $75,000 or more in income. This is 10.6 percentage points higher than the rate in Missouri and 6.8 percentage points higher than in the United States. Those at or above 150 percent of the poverty level made up 93.8% of the population, compared to 80.1% of Missouri.

The average household size was 2.52, while the average family size was 3.14. Among households, 32.3% included at least one person under 18-years-old which is 4.3 percentage points higher than Missouri's rate. Of the housing units, 74.3% are owned as opposed to rented, compared to a rate of 68.6% in Missouri overall.

=== Crime ===
According to data from the Lee's Summit Police Department compiled by the Uniform Crime Reporting program, Lee's Summit in 2024 had a reported violent crime rate of 109.0 per 100,000 people (which includes homicide, rape, robbery, and aggravated assault) and a reported property crime rate of 2348.3 per 100,000 people (which includes arson, burglary, larceny-theft, and motor vehicle theft). The violent crime rate of Lee's Summit was lower than that of Missouri (459.7 violent crimes per 100,000 in 2024) but the property crime rate was higher than that of Missouri (1944.4 property crimes per 100,000 in 2024). The violent crime rate of Lee's Summit was also lower than that of the United States (349.3 violent crimes per 100,000 in 2024) while the property crime rate was higher than that of the United States (1701.8 property crimes per 100,000 in 2024).

== Economy ==
Lee's Summit has historically been a commuter suburb of Kansas City and remains so today. As of 2015, almost 80 percent of workers residing in Lee's Summit commuted outside the city for their employment, with 28 percent working in Kansas City and the rest commuting to other suburbs such as Overland Park and Independence. Only 20 percent were employed in Lee's Summit itself. More than 73 percent of the jobs in Lee's Summit were filled by nonresidents, including about 14 percent from Kansas City, with other suburbs such as Independence and Blue Springs filling the rest.

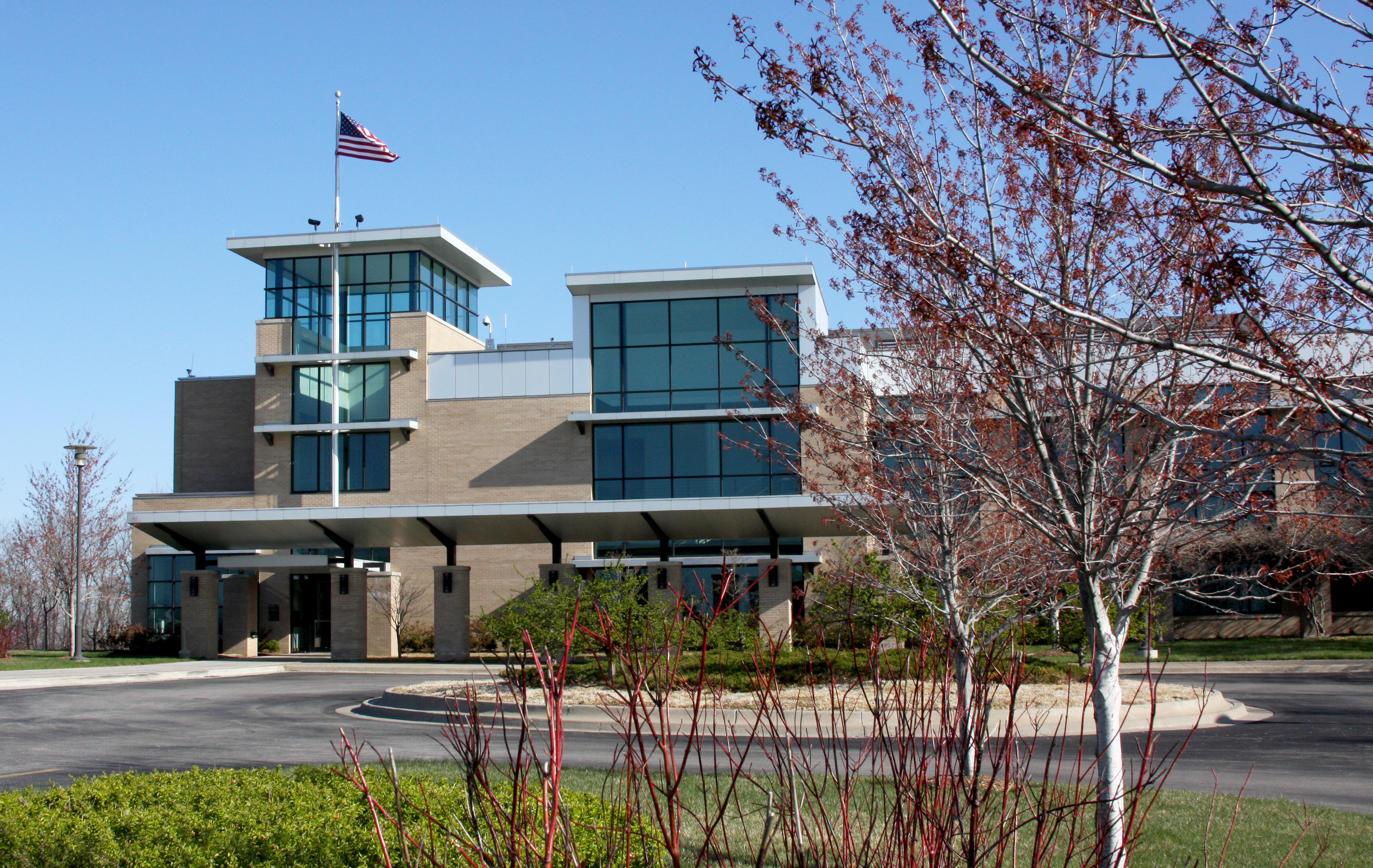
GEHA headquarters building in Lee's Summit

A diverse range of industries operate in Lee's Summit, with healthcare, office, education, and retail employment among the most prevalent. The largest industries by workforce in the city are "Health Care / Social Assistance," "Retail Trade," "Professional / Scientific / Tech Services," "Educational Services," and "Manufacturing." As of 2017, the most common occupations were registered nurses, secretaries, customer service representatives, office clerks, and general managers. The employers with the largest workforces in the city are the Lee's Summit public school district, United States Citizenship and Immigration Services, National Benefits Center, Government Employees Health Association, University Health Lakewood Medical Center, and John Knox Village.

== Arts and culture ==
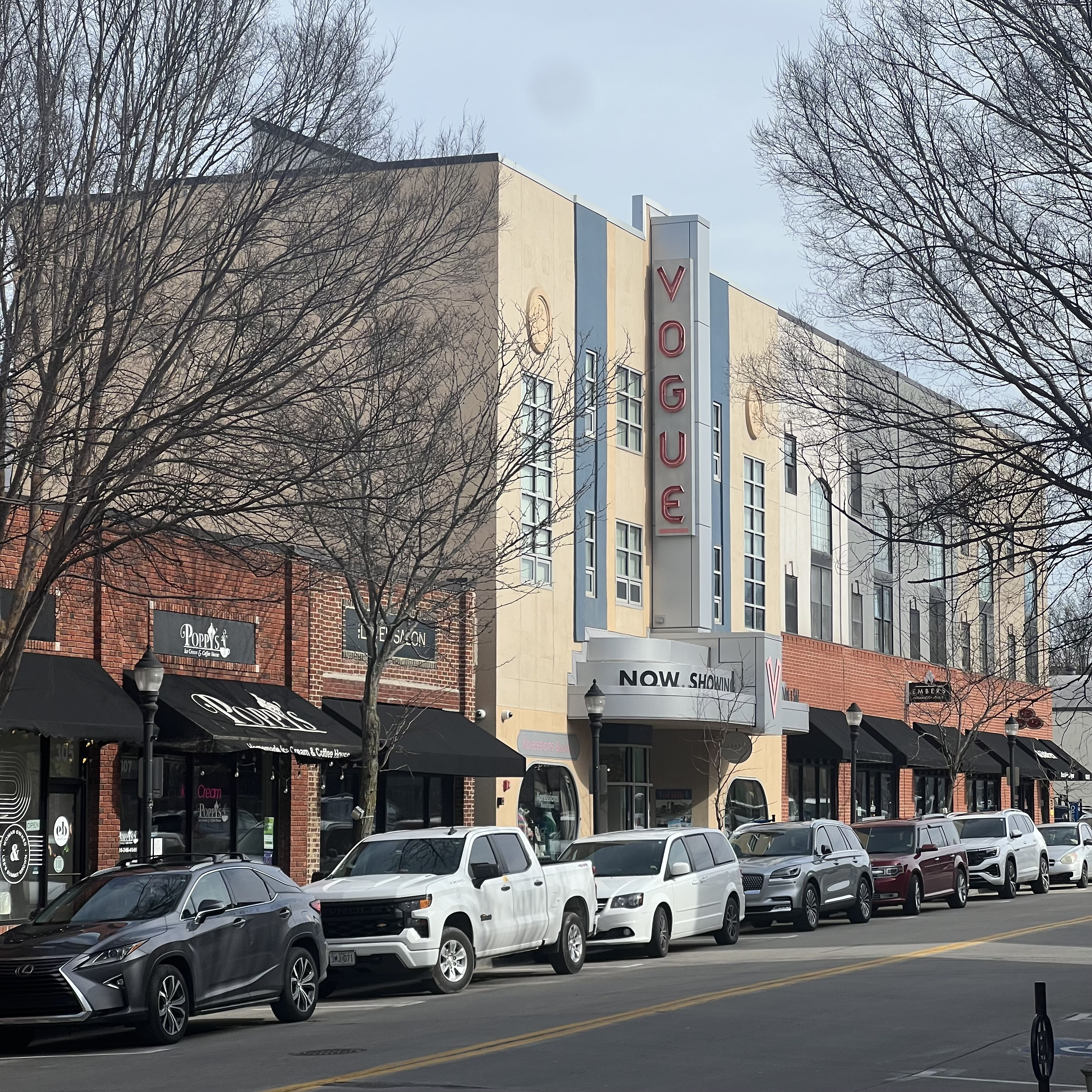
Downtown Lee's Summit, near the intersection of Douglas and Third

Downtown Lee's Summit is listed in the National Register of Historic Places. It hosts the annual Downtown Days and Oktoberfest festivals as well as the monthly Fourth Fridays Art Walk, which showcases local artists and musicians. The Downtown Sculpture Walk and Lee's Summit History Museum are also located in downtown Lee's Summit.

The Legacy Park Ampitheater is an outdoor music venue in Lee's Summit.

Lee's Summit has three public libraries, each of which are part of the Mid-Continent Public Library system.

The Lee's Summit Symphony Orchestra is made up of over 200 local musicians and volunteers who perform in live symphonic concerts. The Summit Theatre Group stages performing arts productions with local volunteers.

== Parks and recreation ==
There are thirty public parks in Lee's Summit with various amenities such as playgrounds, tennis courts, disc golf courses, trails for walking and biking, camp grounds, a golf course, and a winter ice skating rink. Summit Waves is the city's outdoor water park.

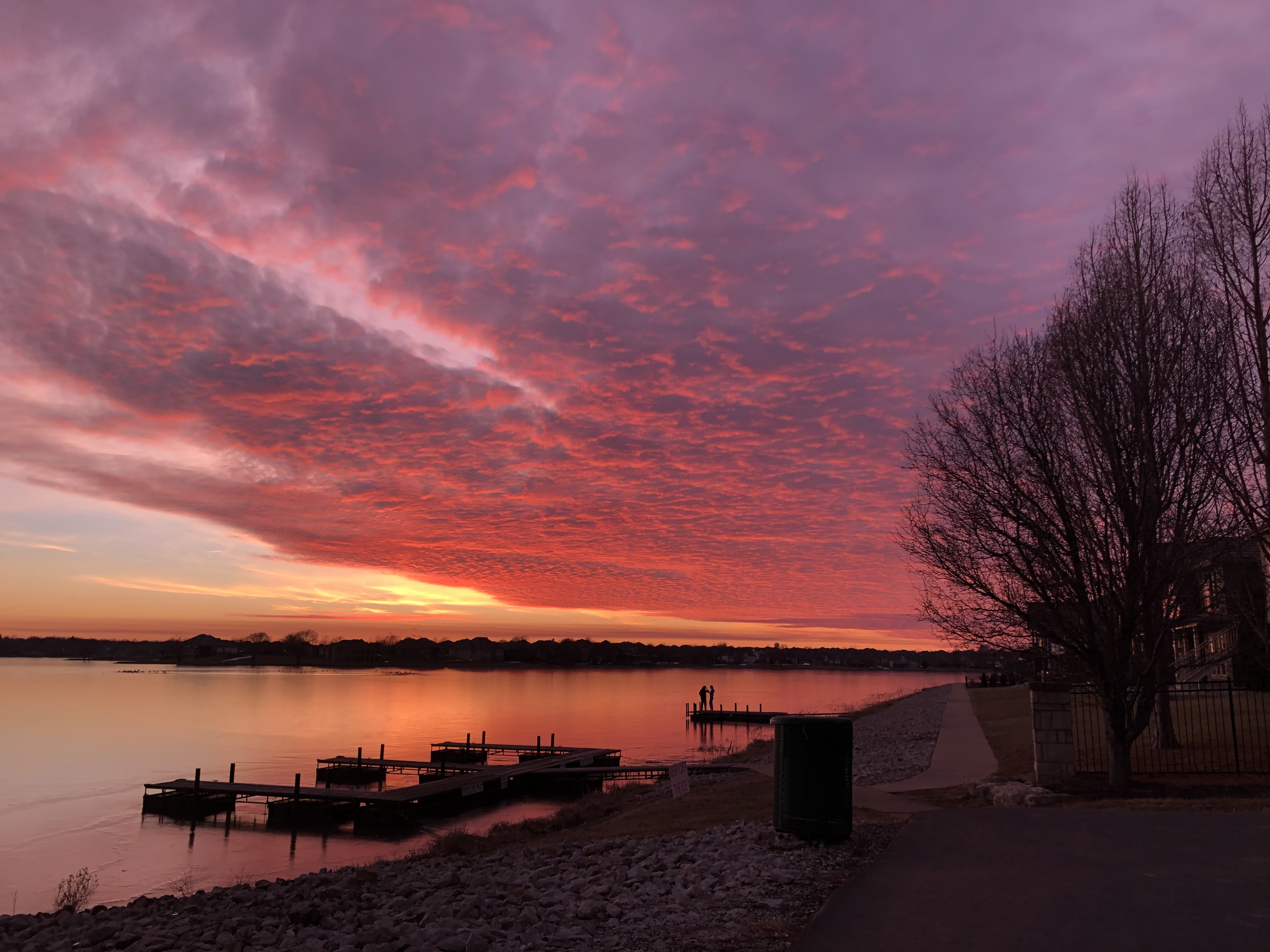
Swim docks at Raintree Lake

The James A. Reed Memorial Wildlife Area is located just outside of Lee's Summit. It is 3,084 acres (12.48 km^{2}) and includes human-made lakes along with woodlands, native flora plantings, and many deer and turkeys. People engage in fishing, hunting, hiking, birdwatching, outdoor photography, picnicking, cycling, and boating there.

Six large human-made lakes and several smaller lakes are located in and around Lee's Summit. People engage in a variety of activities on these lakes such as swimming, fishing, jet skiing, canoeing, and boating.

== Government ==
Lee's Summit is a charter and council-manager form of government, represented by a mayor and a city council. The city council appoints a city manager. Each of the four districts are represented by two councilmembers whose terms are staggered and expire every four years. No councilmember may serve more than two consecutive terms. The mayor is Beto Lopez. Municipal elections in Lee's Summit are nonpartisan.

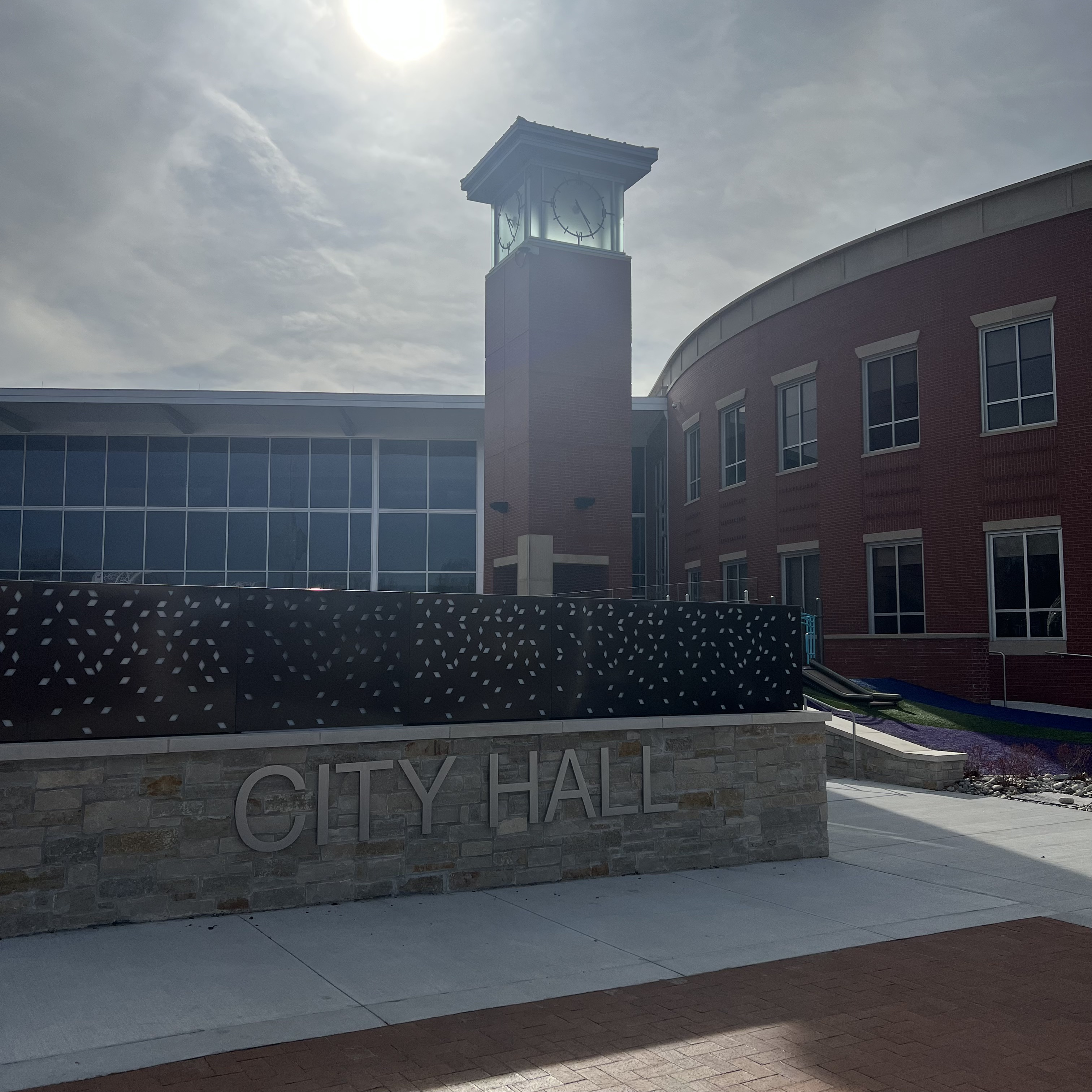
Lee's Summit city hall

The city manager proposes an annual municipal budget which is subject to approval by the city council.

The majority of Lee's Summit is within Missouri's 5th congressional district and is represented in the United States House of Representatives by Democrat Emanuel Cleaver. A small southern portion of the city falls within the 4th congressional district and is represented by Republican Mark Alford. In the Missouri Senate, Lee's Summit is represented by Republican Mike Cierpiot of the 8th district and Republican Rick Brattin of the 31st district. In the Missouri House of Representatives, the city is represented by the Republican Speaker of the House Jonathan Patterson of the 30th district, as well as Democrat Kemp Strickler of the 34th district, Democrat Keri Ingle of the 35th district, and Republican Bill Irwin of the 55th district.

In the 2024 United States presidential election, roughly 51 percent of voters in Lee's Summit voted for Democrats Kamala Harris and Tim Walz while roughly 49 percent voted for Republicans Donald Trump and J.D. Vance (without counting votes for third party candidates).

== Education ==
Lee's Summit is served by five public school districts, principally among them the Lee's Summit R-VII School District, which also includes portions of nearby cities within its jurisdiction. The district operates eighteen elementary schools, four middle schools, and three high schools, with approximately eighteen thousand enrolled students. It is the largest employer in the city. Smaller portions of Lee's Summit are served by Blue Springs R-IV School District, Grandview C-4 School District, Hickman Mills C-1 School District, and Raymore-Peculiar R-II School District. Four private religious schools operate within the city: Lee's Summit Academy, Our Lady of the Presentation Catholic School, St. Michael the Archangel Catholic High School, and Summit Christian Academy.

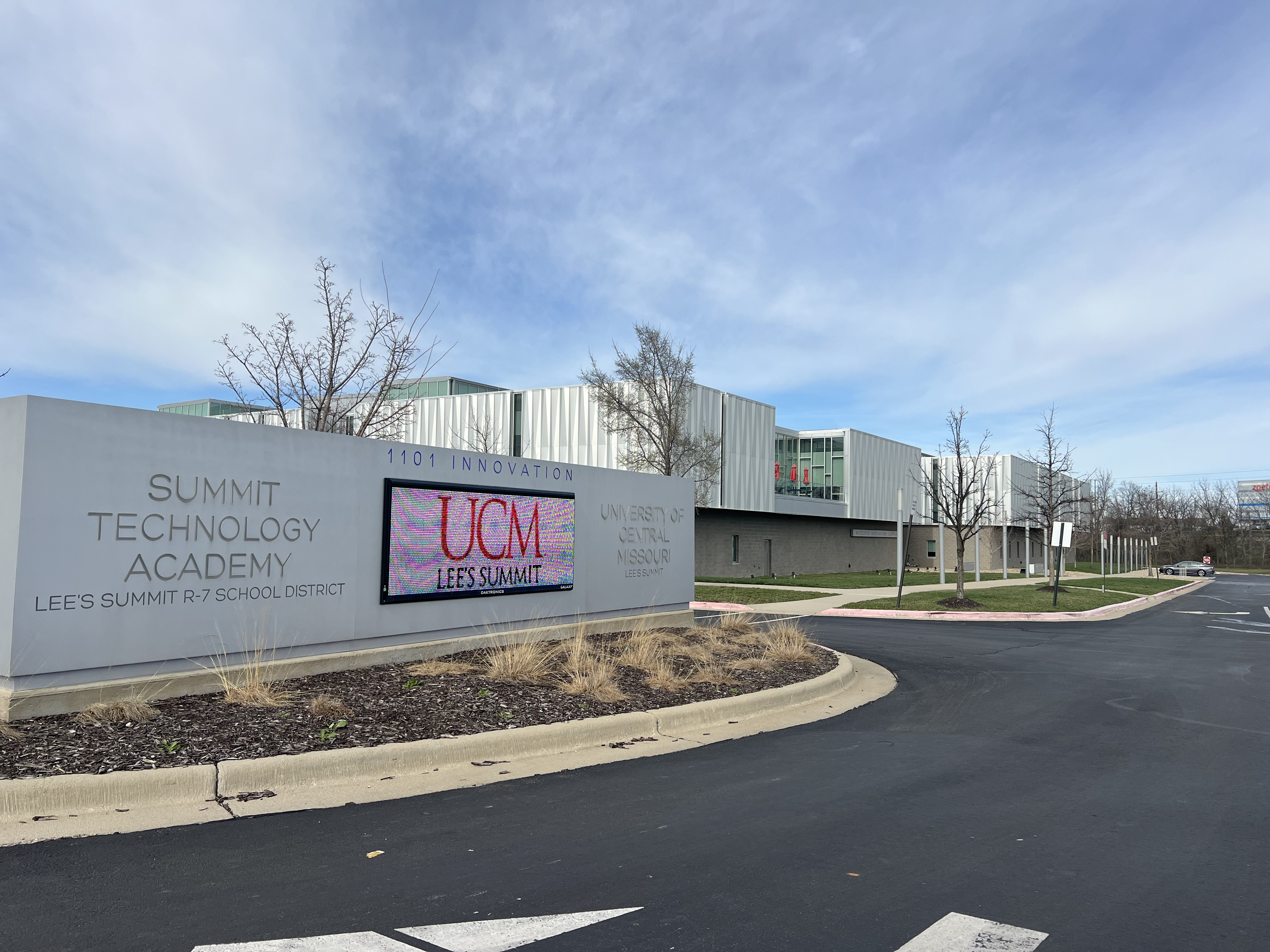
Missouri Innovation Campus

The Missouri Innovation Campus is an education facility located in Lee's Summit shared by the Lee's Summit R-VII School District and the University of Central Missouri. The school district operates the Summit Technology Academy which provides high school students with coursework relating to applied sciences and technology. The University of Central Missouri operates a satellite campus which offers undergraduate and graduate degrees. Longview Community College, part of the Metropolitan Community College system, is located in Lee's Summit.

== Media ==
The Lee's Summit Journal was established in 1881 as a weekly newspaper. In 2000, it was acquired by Knight Ridder, the then parent company of The Kansas City Star. In 2006, McClatchy acquired the Lee's Summit Journal along with the rest of Knight Ridder. It has remained under the ownership of McClatchy since. In 2023, the newspaper ceased print publication, instead publishing stories on the website of The Kansas City Star.

The Lee's Summit Tribune was established in 1995 as a free weekly newspaper. In 2000, it was acquired by Knight Ridder. By 2008, it was no longer owned by McClatchy (which had acquired Knight Ridder) and became locally owned. It ceased online publication on June 2, 2026.

Link 2 Lee's Summit was established in 2016 as a digital newspaper. Since 2017 it has produced the Lee's Summit Town Hall podcast. It publishes online at link2leessummit.com.

The Kansas City Star often reports on topics pertaining to Lee's Summit. The city is also part of the Kansas City television market and receives broadcasts from local Kansas City television stations. It also receives radio broadcast from Kansas City and other nearby cities. KLRX (97.3 FM) is a K-Love radio station broadcasting contemporary Christian music and licensed to Lee's Summit.

Movies and television shows filmed in Lee's Summit include Truman (1995), Jesus Camp (2006), and parts of the fourth season of Ted Lasso (2026).

== Infrastructure ==
=== Transportation ===
The construction of roads and highways in the mid-twentieth century connected Lee's Summit to Kansas City and other nearby suburbs, making them crucial to the growth and suburbanization of the city. Highways remain important to the city, with almost 80 percent of workers residing in Lee's Summit commuting outside the city for work as of 2015.

Interstate 470, U.S. Route 50, and Missouri Route 291 intersect one another in Lee's Summit, forming a triangle of highways surrounding the center of the city. Downtown Lee's Summit, the very center of the city, is adjacent to U.S. Route 50 to the south and southwest and Missouri Route 291 to the east, where the two highways have an interchange. Interstate 470 connects with U.S. Route 50 to the northwest and with Missouri Route 291 to the northeast.

- Interstate 470 is a spur of Interstate 70 which runs east to west from Kansas City through the northwestern border of Lee's Summit, turning north and running through the northern border into Independence
- U.S. Route 40 briefly runs through Lee's Summit at the northern border with Independence
- U.S. Route 50 spurs off from Interstate 470 at the northwestern interchange in the city, then runs to the southeast where it intersects with Missouri Route 291, then turns east and runs through the eastern border into Lake Lotawana
- Missouri Route 150 runs east to west through the southern portion of the city, intersecting with Missouri Route 291, and connecting Lee's Summit to Greenwood (east) and Kansas City (west)
- Missouri Route 291 spurs off from Interstate 470 at the northeastern interchange in the city, then runs south where it intersects with U.S. Route 50, then continues south through the southern border into Lake Winnebago
- Missouri Route 350 begins at the interchange of Interstate 470 and U.S. Route 50, continuing to the northwest and quickly exiting Lee's Summit into Unity Village, Kansas City, and Raytown

The historic Jefferson Highway ran through Lee's Summit.

The Kansas City public transportation system operates the Lee's Summit Express bus route, a commuter line between central Lee's Summit and downtown Kansas City that runs twice per weekday. The City of Lee's Summit also contracts with OATS, a nonprofit reservation bus service that provides transportation within the city.

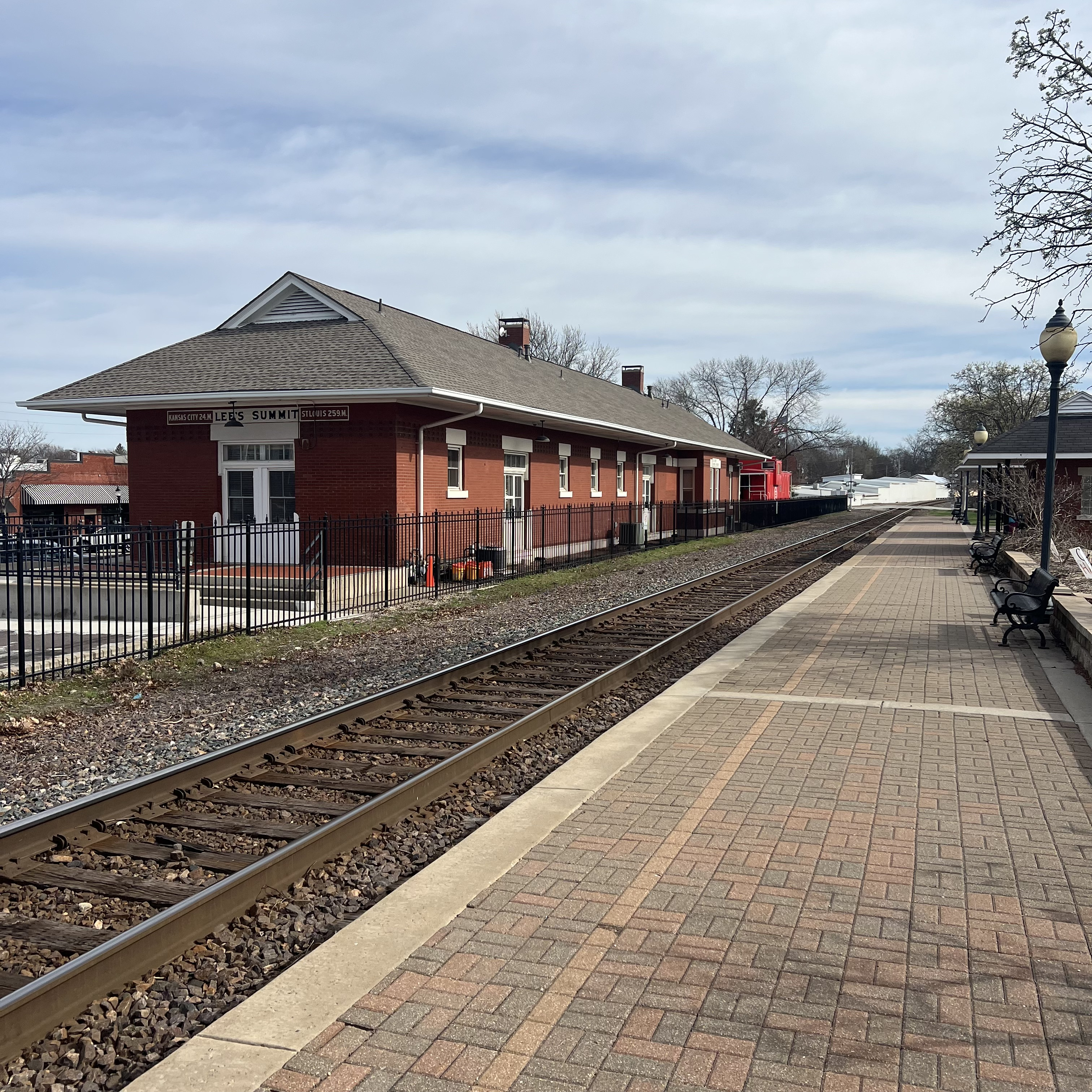
Lee's Summit station, Amtrak platform

The rail line built by the Missouri Pacific Railroad which prompted the founding of Lee's Summit remains in operation, now under the ownership of Union Pacific Railroad. Amtrak operates the Missouri River Runner passenger service between Kansas City and St. Louis, with a stop in Lee's Summit. The Lee's Summit station is located in the city's downtown. The first depot in the city was a boxcar with "Lees Summit" written on its side; this led the city's name to be changed from "Strother" to "Lee's Summit". The current depot was built in 1905.

The Kansas City-Lee's Summit Regional Airport is operated by the City of Lee's Summit and is located north of downtown. The city purchased the airport in 1977.

=== Utilities ===
Lee's Summit Water Utilities provides water and sewage services to nearly all buildings within the city, as well as some outside of it. The utility purchases water from Kansas City (up to 25 million gallons per day) and Independence (up to 7.5 million gallons per day), both of which draw their water from the Missouri River. Wastewater is sent to the Little Blue River Valley Sewer District for treatment.

The city's landfill and recycling facility is located at the Resource Recovery Park, which the city contracts with a private company to operate.

Evergy provides the city with electricity, while Spire provides natural gas.

=== Healthcare ===
Two hospitals, Lee's Summit Medical Center (part of the HCA Healthcare system) and Saint Luke's East Hospital (part of the BJC HealthCare system), operate in Lee's Summit. Each provide primary, surgical, and emergency care. Another hospital, University Health Lakewood Medical Center, is located on the city's northwestern border with Kansas City.

== Sister cities ==
- Aizuwakamatsu, Fukushima Prefecture, Japan
- Ibagué, Tolima, Colombia

== See also ==
- List of cities in Missouri
- List of people from Lee's Summit, Missouri
