= Will Kraus =

American politician

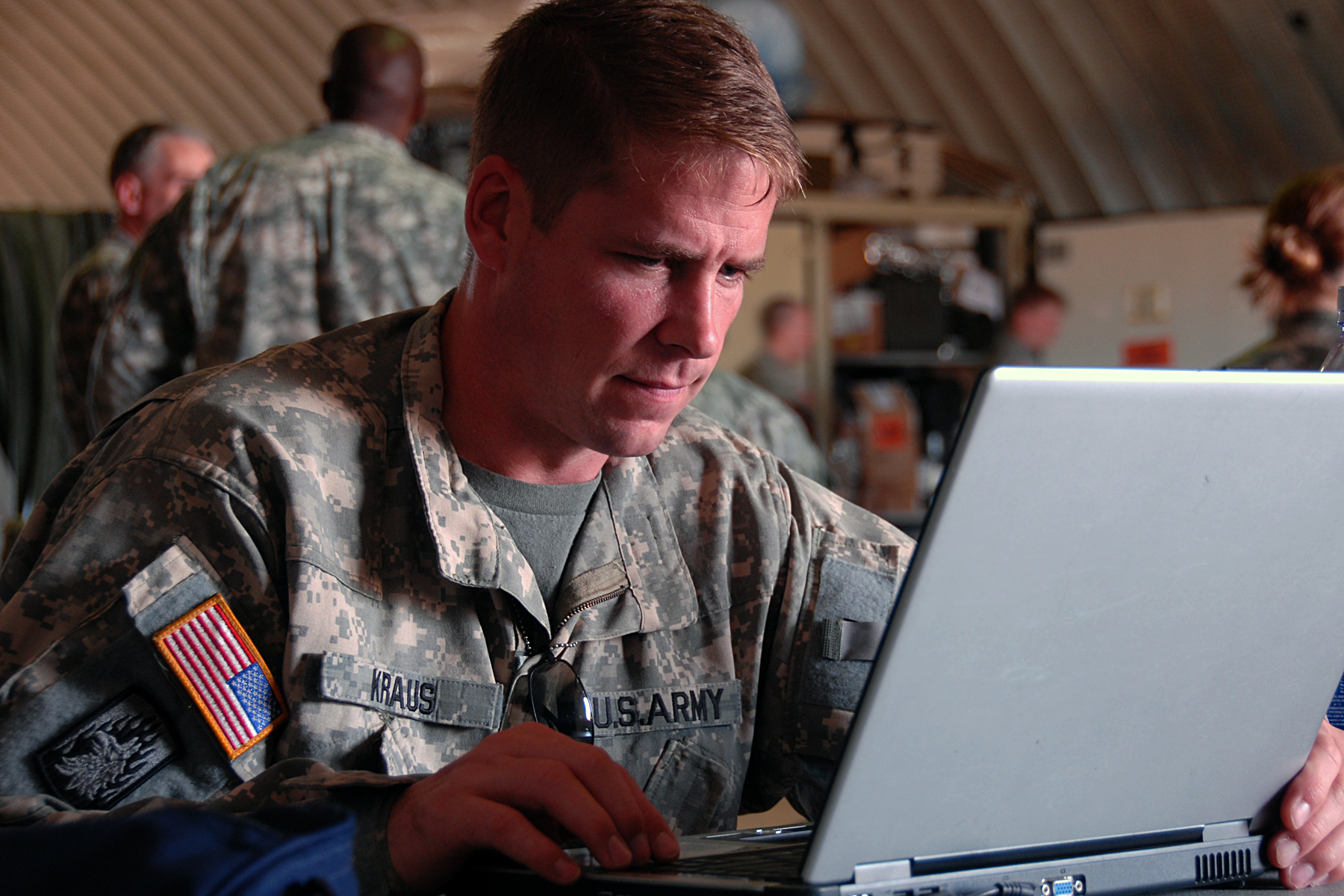

Commissioner of the State Tax Commission of Missouri
- Incumbent
- Assumed office July 31, 2017
- Governor: Eric Greitens; Mike Parson Mike Kehoe

Member of the Missouri Senate from the 8th district
- In office 2011–2017
- Preceded by: Matt Bartle
- Succeeded by: Mike Cierpiot

Member of the Missouri House of Representatives from the 48th district
- In office 2005–2011
- Preceded by: Mike Sager
- Succeeded by: Gary Cross

Personal details
- Born: March 22, 1973 (age 53)
- Party: Republican

Will Kraus (born March 22, 1973) is an American politician who represented eastern Jackson County, Missouri in the Missouri Senate. He is a member of the Republican Party. The district includes the cities of Blue Springs, Grain Valley, Greenwood, Independence (in part), Lake Lotawana, Tapawingo, Lee's Summit, Lone Jack and Oak Grove.

== Missouri House of Representatives ==
Kraus was first elected to the Missouri House of Representatives in 2004 after defeating Democrat Mike Sager in the general election 8,580 votes to 6,526. He was re-elected in 2006 and 2008 respectively. He has served as vice-chair on both the Missouri House of Representatives' Utilities and Health Care Policy Committees, and has also served on the Job Creation and Economic Development Committee.

== Missouri Senate ==
On August 3, 2010, Kraus won the Republican Primary for Missouri's 8th District State Senatorial District; which represents Eastern Jackson County, defeating State Representatives Bryan Pratt and Gary Dusenberg.

On November 2, 2010, Kraus won the general election against Kevin Parr (Libertarian) and was sworn in as the state senator for the 8th District on January 5, 2011. He is running unopposed for re-election to the Senate in 2014.

On July 11, 2014, Kraus announced his intention to run for Missouri Secretary of State in 2016. He lost to Jay Ashcroft in the Republican primary.

== Electoral history ==
2004 General Election for Missouri's 48th State Representative
Party	Candidate	Votes	%
Republican	Will Kraus	9,851	52.85
Democratic	Mike Sager	8,787	47.15

2006 General Election for Missouri's 48th State Representative
Party	Candidate	Votes	%
Republican	Will Kraus	7,646	52.20
Democratic	Chris Moreno	7,000	47.80

2008 General Election for Missouri's 48th State Representative
Party	Candidate	Votes	%
Republican	Will Kraus	11,170	58.03%
Democratic	Joe Volpe	8,078	41.97%

2010 General Election for Missouri's 8th Senate District
Party	Candidate	Votes	%
Republican	Will Kraus	50,615	79.37%
Libertarian	Kevin Parr	13,157	20.63%

2014 General Election for Missouri's 8th Senate District
Party	Candidate	Votes	%
Republican	Will Kraus (unopposed)	31,432	100%

2016 Missouri Secretary of State Republican Primary
Party	Candidate	Votes	%
Republican	Jay Ashcroft	401,361	61.33
Republican	Will Kraus	226,473	34.60
Republican	Roi Chinn	26,638	4.07

== Personal life ==
Kraus resides in Lee's Summit, MO with his wife Carmen, and his two sons Tylor and Tannor. Tylor, the elder of the two sons, is in the Army. Tannor, graduated in May 2016, and plans to attend Missouri Baptist on a basketball scholarship.
