= Missouri's 8th Senate district =

American legislative district

Missouri's 8th State Senate district
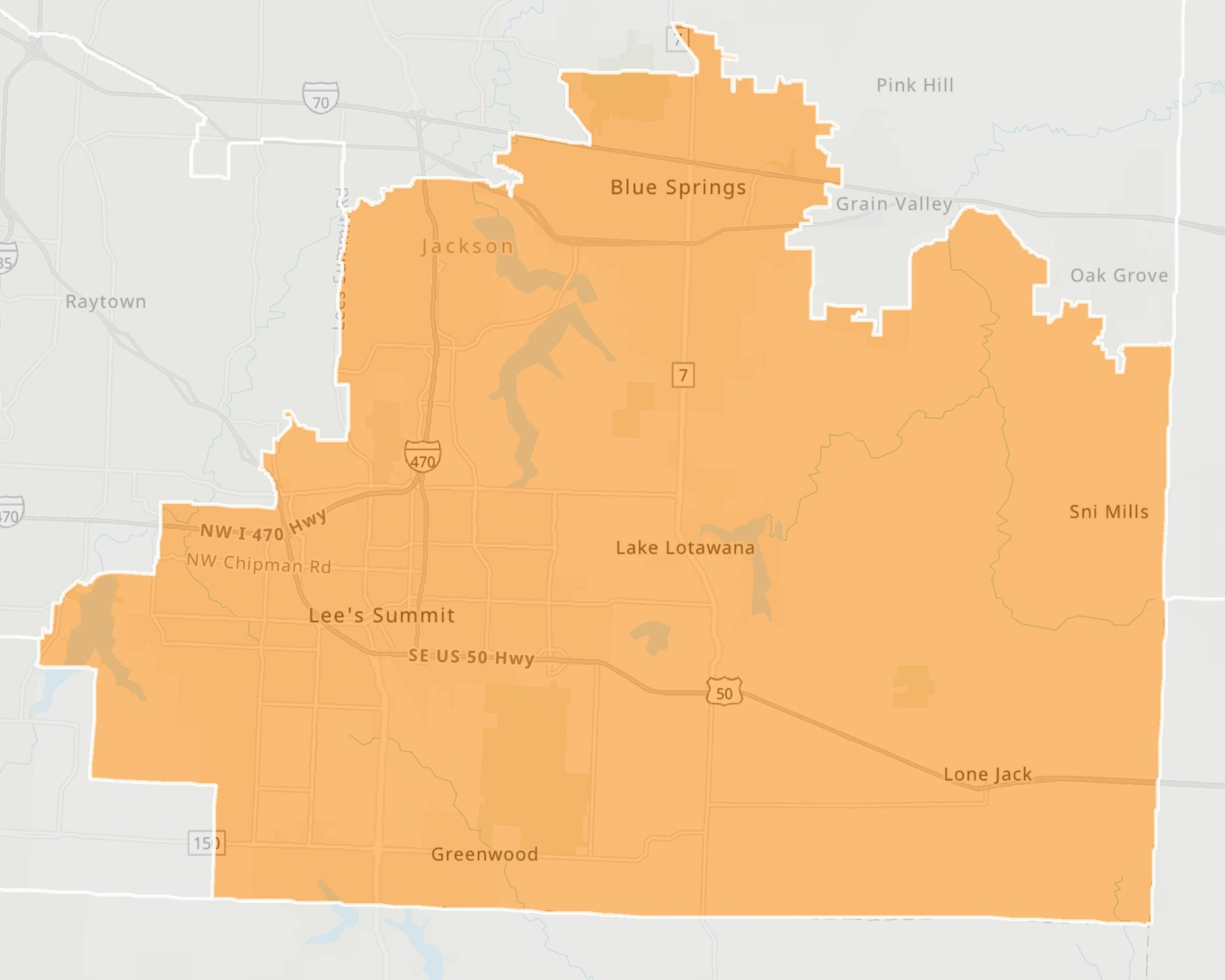
Senator
Mike Cierpiot; R–Lee's Summit
- Demographics: 79% White; 8% Black; 6% Hispanic; 2% Asian; 4% Multiracial
- Population (2023): 180,321

Missouri's 8th Senatorial District is one of 34 districts in the Missouri Senate. The district has been represented by Republican Mike Cierpiot since 2018.

== Geography ==
The district is based in southeastern Jackson County, within the Kansas City metropolitan area. Major municipalities in the district include Blue Springs, Greenwood, and Lee's Summit. The district is also home to Blue Springs Lake, Lake Jacomo, and the Missouri Town Living History Museum.

== 2026 candidates ==
=== Republican primary ===
- Jonathan Patterson, representative and speaker of the Missouri House
- Dan Stacy, former representative of Missouri House District 31

=== Democratic primary ===
- Keri Ingle, representative of Missouri House District 35

== Election results (1998–2022) ==
=== 1998 ===
Missouri's 8th Senatorial District election (1998)
Party	Candidate	Votes	%
Republican	Bill Kenney	34,470	56.3
Republican	Pat Starke	25,558	41.7
Libertarian	Chris Caviness	1,215	2.0
Total votes		61,243	100.0

=== 2002 ===
Missouri's 8th Senatorial District election (2002)
Party	Candidate	Votes	%
Republican	Matt Bartle	36,393	61.0
Democratic	Bruce Dotson	23,289	39.0
Total votes		59,682	100.0
Republican hold			

=== 2006 ===
Missouri's 8th Senatorial District election (2006)
Party	Candidate	Votes	%
Republican	Matt Bartle (incumbent)	43,860	58.5
Democratic	Jason Norbury	31,120	41.5
Total votes		74,980	100.0
Republican hold			

=== 2010 ===
Missouri's 8th Senatorial District election (2010)
Party	Candidate	Votes	%
Republican	Will Kraus	50,615	79.4
Libertarian	Kevin Parr	13,157	20.6
Total votes		63,772	100.0
Republican hold			

=== 2014 ===
Missouri's 8th Senatorial District election (2014)
Party	Candidate	Votes	%
Republican	Will Kraus (incumbent)	31,432	100.0
Total votes		31,432	100.0
Republican hold			

=== 2017 ===
Missouri's 8th Senatorial District special election (2017)
Party	Candidate	Votes	%
Republican	Mike Cierpiot	12,852	50.3
Democratic	Hillary Shields	10,872	42.6
Independent	Jacob Turk	1,806	7.1
Total votes		25,530	100.0
Republican hold			

=== 2018 ===
Missouri's 8th Senatorial District election (2018)
Party	Candidate	Votes	%
Republican	Mike Cierpiot (incumbent)	41,150	54.7
Democratic	Hillary Shields	34,127	45.3
Total votes		75,277	100.0
Republican hold			

=== 2022 ===
Missouri's 8th Senatorial District election (2022)
Party	Candidate	Votes	%
Republican	Mike Cierpiot (incumbent)	38,018	55.8
Democratic	Antoine D. Jennings	30,100	44.2
Total votes		68,118	100.0
Republican hold			

== Statewide election results ==
Year	Office	Results
2008	President	McCain 55.1 – 43.7%
2012	President	Romney 58.8 – 41.2%
2016	President	Trump 55.5 – 38.9%
2016	Senate	Blunt 49.0 – 46.5%
2016	Governor	Greitens 52.1 – 44.9%
2018	Senate	Hawley 50.4 – 46.9%
2020	President	Trump 52.3 – 45.7%
2020	Governor	Parson 53.4 – 44.6%
