= Rob Vescovo =

American politician from Missouri, United States

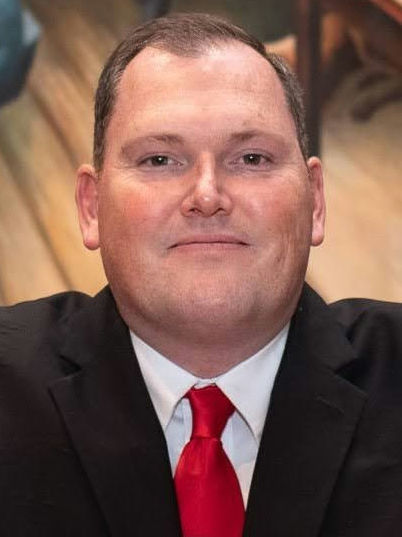

Speaker of the Missouri House of Representatives
- In office January 9, 2021 – January 4, 2023
- Preceded by: Elijah Haahr
- Succeeded by: Dean Plocher

Majority Leader of the Missouri House of Representatives
- In office November 14, 2017 – January 6, 2021
- Preceded by: Mike Cierpiot
- Succeeded by: Dean Plocher

Member of the Missouri House of Representatives from the 112th district
- In office January 7, 2015 – January 4, 2023
- Preceded by: Paul Wieland
- Succeeded by: Renee Reuter

Personal details
- Born: January 6, 1977 (age 49) St. Louis, Missouri, U.S.
- Party: Republican
- Spouse: Amanda
- Children: 5
- Education: Southeast Missouri State University (BA)

Robert Vescovo (born January 6, 1977) is an American politician who served in the Missouri House of Representatives and was formerly the Speaker of the Missouri House of Representatives. A member of the Republican Party, he previously served as Majority Floor Leader for 4 years.

== Personal life and family ==
Vescovo is married, he and his wife Amanda have five children.

== Political career ==
First elected in 2014 Vescovo defeated challenger Benjamin Hagin to win a third term in the Missouri House of Representatives representing District 112 which covers parts of north and central Jefferson County, Missouri.

== Electoral history ==
Missouri House of Representatives Primary Election, August 5, 2014, District 112
Party	Candidate	Votes	%	±%
Republican	Rob Vescovo	1,159	45.94%	
Republican	Charles Groeteke	1,151	45.62%	
Republican	Avery Fortenberry	213	8.44%	

Missouri House of Representatives Election, November 4, 2014, District 112
Party	Candidate	Votes	%	±%
Republican	Rob Vescovo	5,432	60.07%	+0.97
Democratic	Robert W. Butler	3,611	39.93%	−0.97

Missouri House of Representatives Election, November 8, 2016, District 112
Party	Candidate	Votes	%	±%
Republican	Rob Vescovo	10,754	59.64%	−0.43
Democratic	Robert Butler	7,278	40.36%	+0.43

Missouri House of Representatives Election, November 6, 2018, District 112
Party	Candidate	Votes	%	±%
Republican	Rob Vescovo	9,621	61.30%	+1.66
Democratic	Benjamin Hagin	6,074	38.70%	−1.66

== Political positions ==
On Abortion, Vescovo describes himself as "100 percent pro-life.”

Missouri House of Representatives
Preceded by Mike Cierpiot	Majority Leader of the Missouri House of Representatives; 2017–2021	Succeeded by Dean Plocher
Political offices
Preceded by Elijah Haahr	Speaker of the Missouri House of Representatives; 2021–2023	Succeeded by Dean Plocher
