= Dean Plocher =

American politician

Speaker of the Missouri House of Representatives
- In office January 4, 2023 – January 8, 2025
- Preceded by: Rob Vescovo
- Succeeded by: Jonathan Patterson

Majority Leader of the Missouri House of Representatives
- In office January 6, 2021 – January 4, 2023
- Preceded by: Rob Vescovo
- Succeeded by: Jonathan Patterson

Member of the Missouri House of Representatives from the 89th district
- In office January 6, 2016 – January 8, 2025
- Preceded by: John Diehl
- Succeeded by: George J. Hruza

Personal details
- Born: March 11, 1970 (age 56) Des Peres, Missouri, U.S.
- Party: Republican
- Spouse: Rebecca Plocher
- Children: 2
- Education: Middlebury College (BA); Saint Louis University (JD)

Dean Plocher (born March 11, 1970) is an American politician who served in the Missouri House of Representatives from 2016 to 2025, representing the 89th district. He was elected speaker of the Missouri House of Representatives on January 4, 2023 and in 2024 ran for Secretary of State but lost in the Republican primary to Denny Hoskins.

== Personal life ==
Dean Plocher is a sixth generation Missourian and a lifelong resident of St. Louis County. He is married to Rebecca Plocher, with whom he has two children.

=== Education ===
Plocher graduated from Ladue Horton Watkins High School. He earned a B.A. in political science with a minor in Classical Civilizations from Middlebury College. He obtained his J.D. in 1997 from Saint Louis University School of Law, where he also received a Certificate in International and Comparative Law.

=== Professional career ===
Before attending law school, Plocher worked in the financial management industry with Franklin Templeton. Following law school, he worked for a small law firm with an emphasis on real estate matters before starting his own law firm. Plocher served as a Municipal Judge in the 21st Judicial Circuit and served on the board of directors for the Missouri Municipal and Associate Circuit Judges Association.

== Political career ==
In 2015, Plocher was elected to the House in a special election to represent the 89th district, triggered by the resignation of then-Speaker John Diehl. In 2020, he was selected to serve as the majority floor leader for the Missouri House of Representatives, pursuing the position based on his experience in the General Laws Committee. In 2023, Plocher was unanimously selected to serve as the Speaker of the Missouri House of Representatives. Later that year, Plocher initially announced a run for Missouri Lieutenant Governor; however, following the withdrawal of Caleb Rowden from the Missouri Secretary of State race, he switched and filed for Secretary of State.

== Political positions ==
=== Marie Watkins Oliver ===
In April 2024, Plocher sponsored House Resolution 4926, leading to the induction of Marie Watkins Oliver, the "Betsy Ross of Missouri," into the Hall of Famous Missourians. Despite a monument being constructed to honor her years ago, it had never been displayed until this resolution. Plocher highlighted Oliver's significant contributions to Missouri's cultural heritage and her role in designing the Missouri state flag. He emphasized her dedication to preserving and promoting the state's history, underscoring her impact on Missouri's historical and cultural landscape.

=== Tax cuts ===
In 2023, Dean Plocher advocated for further tax cuts in response to Missouri's substantial budget surplus, emphasizing the importance of returning surplus funds to taxpayers.

=== Second Amendment rights ===
Plocher helped pass Missouri's Second Amendment Preservation Act. The law bars local law enforcement from enforcing federal firearms regulations considered unconstitutional by the state. This includes laws on firearm registration, restrictions on firearm sales, and certain limitations on gun ownership.

=== Property taxes ===
Plocher established a special committee to reform property taxes in Missouri in response to citizens experiencing extreme increases in their property tax bills.

=== Israel ===
In May 2024, the Missouri House of Representatives passed a resolution urging the U.S. government to continue its support for Israel. The resolution emphasized the importance of the U.S.-Israel relationship, highlighting shared values and mutual benefits. Representative Dean Plocher supported the resolution, underscoring the strategic and democratic alliance between the two nations and advocating for sustained political and military aid to Israel.

=== Election integrity ===
Plocher supports paper ballots but opposes switching from machine counting to hand counting, as he believes machine error rates don't warrant it. He has backed a House-approved bill requiring proof of citizenship on Missouri driver's licenses for voting.

=== Reproductive rights ===
Plocher supports maintaining Missouri's laws that restrict abortions.

=== Immigration ===
Plocher supports enforcing stricter deportation measures in Missouri, defunding "sanctuary cities," and proposing a state law to align with federal regulations, making it illegal to reside in Missouri unlawfully.

=== LGBT rights ===
Plocher voiced support for Senate Bill 49 and Senate Bill 39. Senate Bill 49 prohibits doctors from prescribing cross-sex hormones, puberty blockers, or performing gender transition surgeries on individuals under 18, and Senate Bill 39 requires athletes to compete based on their biological sex, with allowances for female students joining male teams if no equivalent exists.

== Awards ==
In January 2023, the Missouri Pork Association honored Representative Dean Plocher with the "Legislator of the Year" award. This recognition was given for his consistent support and advocacy for Missouri's pork producers and the agricultural industry.

== Criticism ==
=== Ethics investigation ===
In October 2023, Missouri senators called for Plocher's resignation following accusations that he had filed false expense reports and pushed for an $800,000 contract with a private company to handle constituent information without following the normal bidding process. Plocher began repaying reimbursements and attributed the expense reports to an accounting error. Concerns were also raised by a congressional staff member who reported feeling intimidated by Plocher, and by the past chief of staff who had served three previous speakers before being terminated by Plocher. Plocher accused the committee of drawing out the investigation, while committee chair Hannah Kelly accused Plocher of attempting to block the live-streaming of hearings. After a seven-month investigation, the House Ethics Committee dismissed the complaints against Plocher on a bipartisan 7–2 vote, with one Democrat voting present. the committee could find no credible evidence that Plocher made threats to fellow Representatives or their staff.

In 2024, at the end of his term as speaker, Plocher's office refused to pay the attorney hired by the ethics committee and attempted to change rules to prevent further ethics investigations on legislative expense accounts. The succeeding speaker subsequently paid the attorney and adjusted rules to require a speaker to recuse themself from processes in which they themselves are investigated.

=== Hiring and appointment ===
In November 2023, Plocher announced that he had hired Rod Jetton, previous speaker of the Missouri House of Representatives and author of books about biblical teachings and how to recover from personal crisis, as chief of staff. The action was criticized as insulting towards victims of domestic violence, as Jetton was previously convicted of misdemeanor assault for "recklessly caused serious physical injury" to an unnamed woman during a sexual encounter.

Democrats in the House questioned Plocher's motivations in appointing representative Sarah Unsicker to the Special Committee on Government Accountability following her ejection from the Democrat Caucus and committee assignments due to accusations of Antisemitism.

=== Renovations ===
Plocher was criticized for a $60,000 renovation in the Missouri State Capitol. Half of the funds were spent on repairs to walls, baseboards, and ceilings, and the other half on new furnishings. The renovation aimed to align with the Missouri State Capitol Commission's 2019 master plan to restore the office and House chamber to their original historical significance while incorporating updated technology and energy-efficient infrastructure. However, the project faced criticism for the inclusion of a "butler's pantry," a makeshift storage room stocked with liquor, beer, wine, and soda, as well as concerns about the shortage of ADA-compliant workspaces in the building, a lack of transparency in the use of House operating funds, and the expense of custom furnishings. The room was re-assigned as office space following Plocher's tenure.

== Electoral history ==
Missouri House of Representatives Special Election, November 3, 2015, District 89
Party	Candidate	Votes	%	±%
Republican	Dean Plocher	3,462	60.20%	−6.14
Democratic	Al Gerber	2,289	39.80%	+6.14
Total votes		5,751	100.00%	

Missouri House of Representatives Election, November 8, 2016, District 89
Party	Candidate	Votes	%	±%
Republican	Dean Plocher	15,310	65.10%	+4.90
Democratic	Jack Schilligo	8,207	34.90%	−4.90
Total votes		23,517	100.00%	

Missouri House of Representatives Election, November 6, 2018, District 89
Party	Candidate	Votes	%	±%
Republican	Dean Plocher	12,922	58.38%	−6.72
Democratic	Kevin FitzGerald	9,212	41.62%	+6.72
Total votes		22,134	100.00%	

Missouri House of Representatives Election, November 3, 2020, District 89
Party	Candidate	Votes	%	±%
Republican	Dean Plocher	15,200	59.65%	+1.27
Democratic	Luke Barber	10,283	40.35%	−1.27
Total votes		25,483	100.00%	

Missouri House of Representatives Election, November 8, 2022, District 89
Party	Candidate	Votes	%	±%
Republican	Dean Plocher	10,559	60.13%	+0.48
Democratic	Luke Barber	7,002	39.87%	−0.48
Total votes		17,561	100.00%	

Missouri House of Representatives
Preceded by Rob Vescovo	Majority Leader of the Missouri House of Representatives; 2021–2023	Succeeded by Jonathan Patterson
Political offices
Preceded by Rob Vescovo	Speaker of the Missouri House of Representatives; 2023–2025	Succeeded by Jonathan Patterson
