= Lee's Summit station =

Lee's Summit, MO
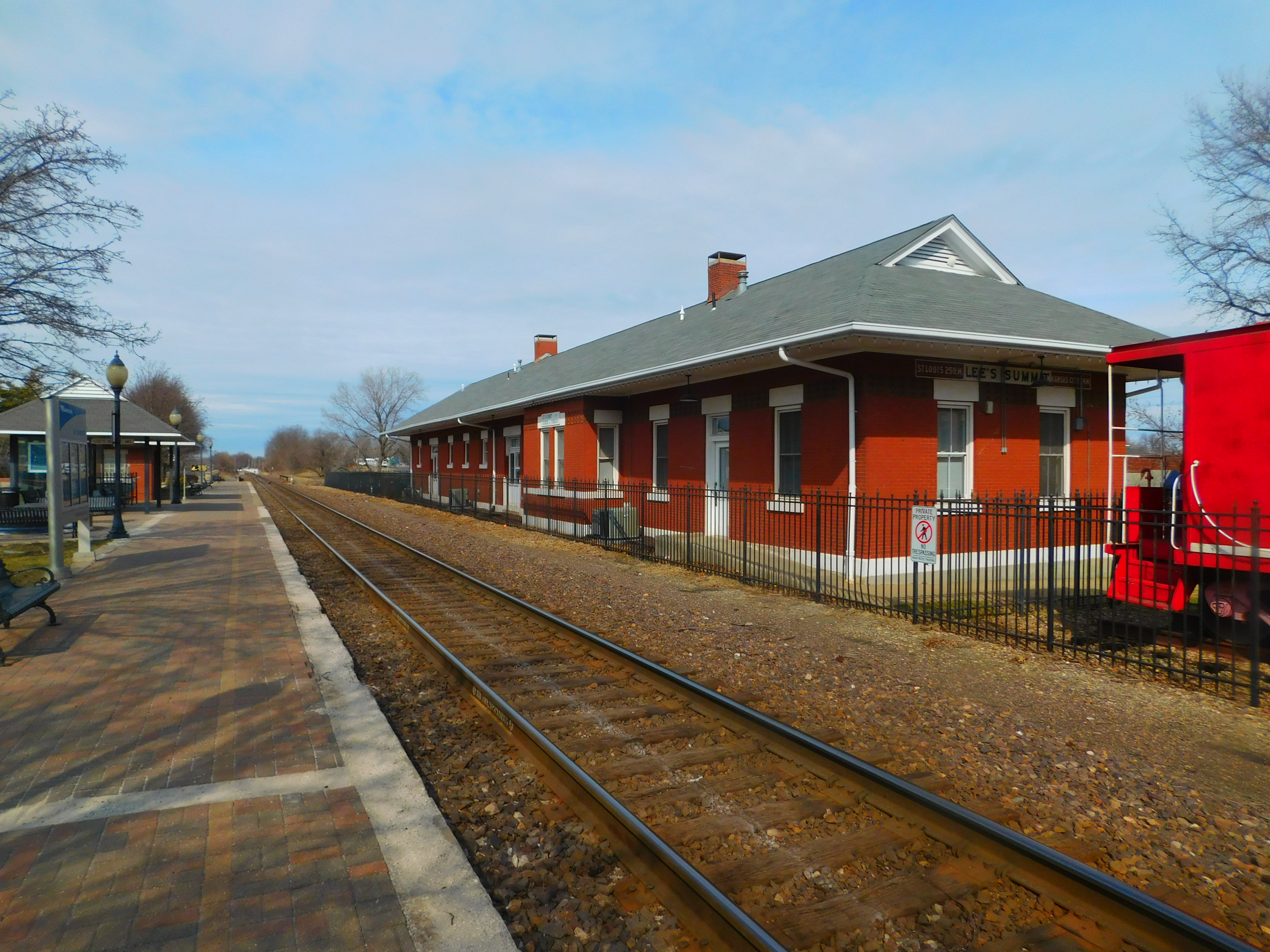
- The station at Lee's Summit in February 2017

General information
- Location: 220 SW Main Street; Lee's Summit, Missouri; United States
- Coordinates: 38.9124°N 94.3783°W
- Owner: Union Pacific Railroad
- Platforms: 1 side platform
- Tracks: 1

Construction
- Accessible: Yes

Other information
- Station code: Amtrak: LEE

History
- Opened: 1905
- Rebuilt: 2002

Passengers
- FY 2025: 30,452 (Amtrak)

Services
Preceding station	Amtrak	Following station
Independence toward Kansas City	Missouri River Runner	Warrensburg toward St. Louis
Former services
Preceding station	Missouri Pacific Railroad	Following station
Little Blue toward Kansas City	Main Line	Holden toward St. Louis
Location

Lee's Summit station is an Amtrak train station in Lee's Summit, Missouri, United States. The station was originally built in 1905 by the Missouri Pacific Railroad. Although the station house remains intact, passengers board the trains from an all-glass rail house across the tracks.

== See also ==
- List of Amtrak stations
