= Kevin Grover =

American politician

Member-elect of the Missouri House of Representatives from the 30th district
- Assuming office January 6, 2027
- Succeeding: Jon Patterson

Personal details
- Born: Kansas City, Missouri
- Party: Democratic
- Education: University of Missouri, Columbia; Northwest Missouri State University
- Website: Campaign website

Kevin Grover is an American politician of the Missouri Democratic Party who is the representative-elect for the 30th district in the Missouri House of Representatives. He was elected in the 2026 general election. Grover is a retired educator and minister.
