= Saint Paul's Episcopal Church (Lee's Summit, Missouri) =

Historic church in Missouri, United States

- U.S. National Register of Historic Places
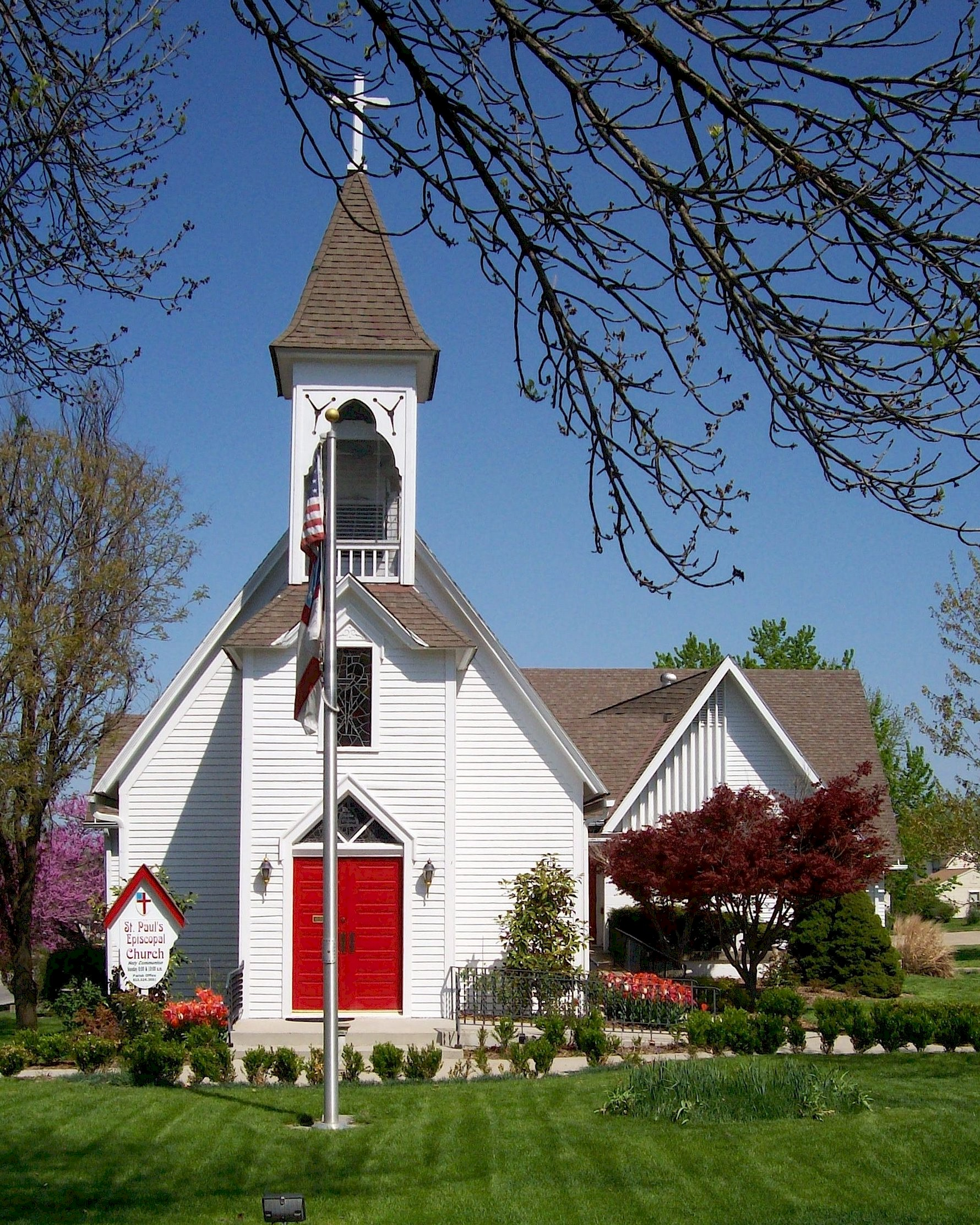
- St. Paul's view from 5th Street

- Location within Missouri Location within the United States
- Location: Fifth and S. Green Streets., Lee's Summit, Missouri
- Coordinates: 38°54′39″N 94°22′21″W
- Built: 1884
- Architect: Rev.F. B. Sheetz
- Architectural style: Carpenter Gothic
- NRHP reference No.: 85002720
- Added to NRHP: October 03, 1985

St. Paul's Episcopal Church is a historic Carpenter Gothic style Episcopal church building located on a triangular lot at 416 Southeast Grand Avenue at the corner of Fifth and Green streets in Lee's Summit, Missouri, United States. The parish was established in 1867. The original sanctuary and current building were designed by the Rev. Frederick B. Scheetz and completed in 1884. The building is a rare example of an extant wood framed Carpenter Gothic church in the state of Missouri. The interior walls and vaulted ceilings are covered with narrow strips of wood paneling set diagonally on the walls and horizontally on the ceiling. A trio of stained glass windows is set above the wooden altar in the apse at the north end of the transept. The church has received few if any alterations since it was built in 1884.

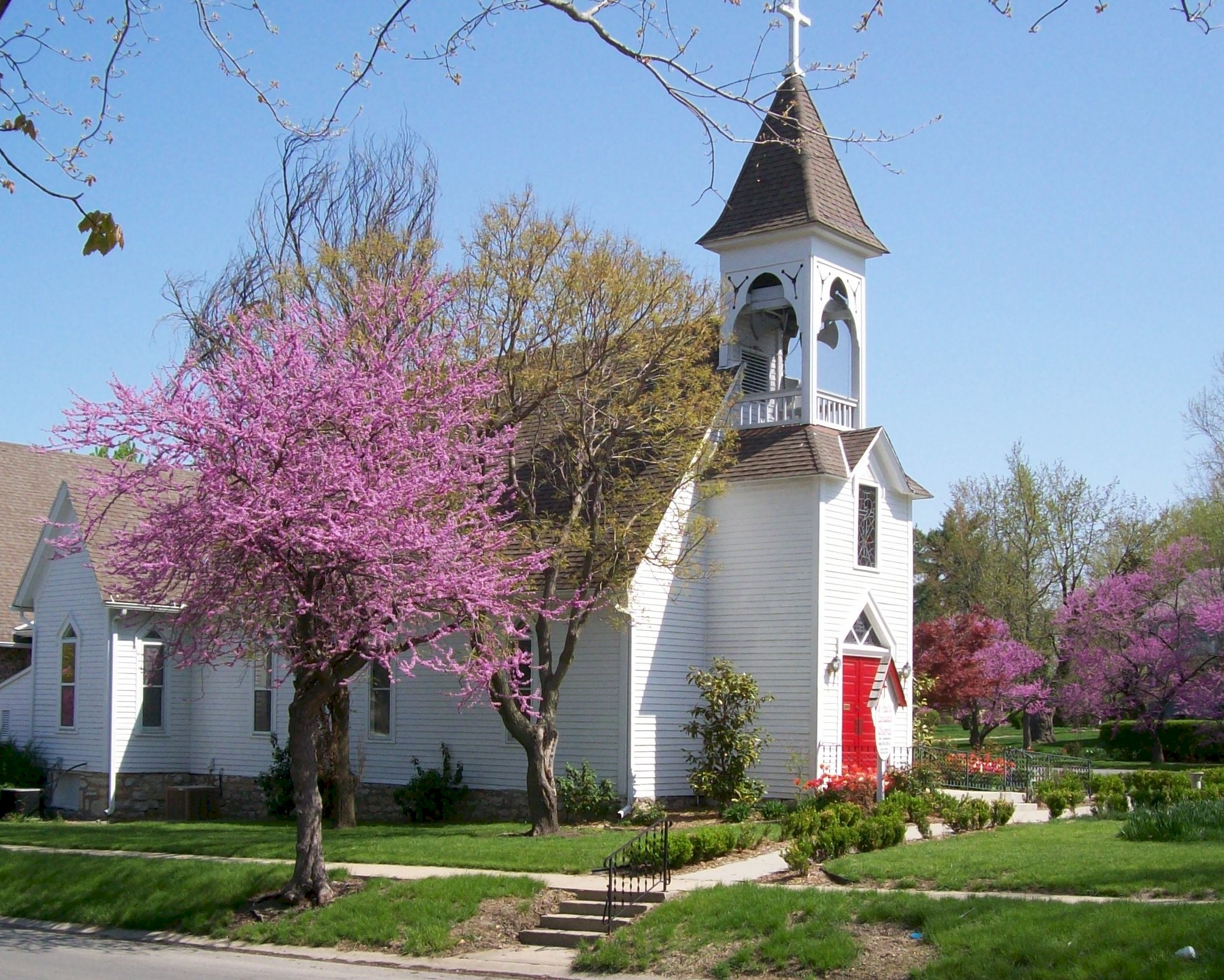
2008 March View from Green St.

An early description of the newly built church would be accurate today: "The church is frame, 40 feet by 24, with a porch in front 8 by 10 feet, with a bell tower extending above the roof. It is strongly and well built, with a solid stone foundation, which is so high in the rear of the church as to give room for a cellar for wood. The interior is ceiled throughout with narrow stuff put on diagonally, the timbers above do not show."'

St. Paul's Episcopal Church embodies a distinctive; type of 'vernacular' adaptation to the earlier Gothic Revival style important in church construction. Economic exigencies as well as available materials quite probably limited this Midwestern frame structure to a relatively small derivative of the more expansive models constructed in the eastern United States. The simple form and decorative features of St. Paul's reflect the Midwestern 19th century philosophy of spiritual beliefs constrained by the realities of the time and place. The continuity in the structure can easily be interpreted to reflect the continuity in the religious community, which began and still maintains the building. St. Paul's Episcopal was added to the National Register of Historic Places on October 9, 1985.

== Current status ==
St. Paul's is still an active parish in the Episcopal Diocese of West Missouri. The Rev. Mark McGuire is the current rector.
