= Lee's Summit Municipal Airport =

Kansas City - Lee's Summit Regional Airport
- IATA: none; ICAO: KLXT; FAA LID: LXT

Summary
- Airport type: Public
- Owner: City of Lee's Summit
- Serves: Lee's Summit, Missouri
- Elevation AMSL: 1,004 ft / 306 m
- Coordinates: 38°57′35″N 094°22′17″W

Map
- Location of airport in Missouri / United States LXT (the United States)

Runways
Direction	Length		Surface
Direction	ft	m	Surface
18/36	5,501	1,677	Concrete
11/29	4,000	1,219	Concrete

Statistics (2020)
- Aircraft operations: 52,500
- Based aircraft: 132
- Source: Federal Aviation Administration

Kansas City - Lee's Summit Regional Airport (ICAO: KLXT, FAA LID: LXT) is a public use airport in Jackson County, Missouri, United States. It is owned by the City of Lee's Summit and is located three nautical miles (6 km) north of its central business district. This facility is included in the National Plan of Integrated Airport Systems, which categorized it as a general aviation reliever airport.

In September, 2024, Lee's Summit revealed that it would be submitting paperwork to rename the airport to take advantage of the increased traffic expected for the 2026 World Cup matches to be held in Kansas City. The name would be changed from Lee's Summit Municipal Airport to Greater Kansas City Regional Airport.. The new name for the airport was announced on Sept 11, 2025.

Although many U.S. airports use the same three-letter location identifier for the FAA and IATA, this airport is assigned LXT by the FAA but has no designation from the IATA.

== Facilities and aircraft ==
Kansas City - Lee's Summit Regional Airport covers an area of 486 acres (197 ha) at an elevation of 1,004 feet (306 m) above mean sea level. It has two runways with concrete surfaces: 18/36 is 5,501 by 100 feet (1,677 x 23 m) and 11/29 is 4,000 by 75 feet (1,219 x 23 m).

For the 12-month period ending December 31, 2020, the airport had 52,500 aircraft operations, an average of 144 per day: 95% general aviation, 3% air taxi, and 1% military. At that time there were 132 aircraft based at this airport: 115 single-engine, 9 multi-engine, 6 jet, and 2 helicopter.

== See also ==
- List of airports in Missouri
