= Independence station =

Amtrak train station

Independence, MO
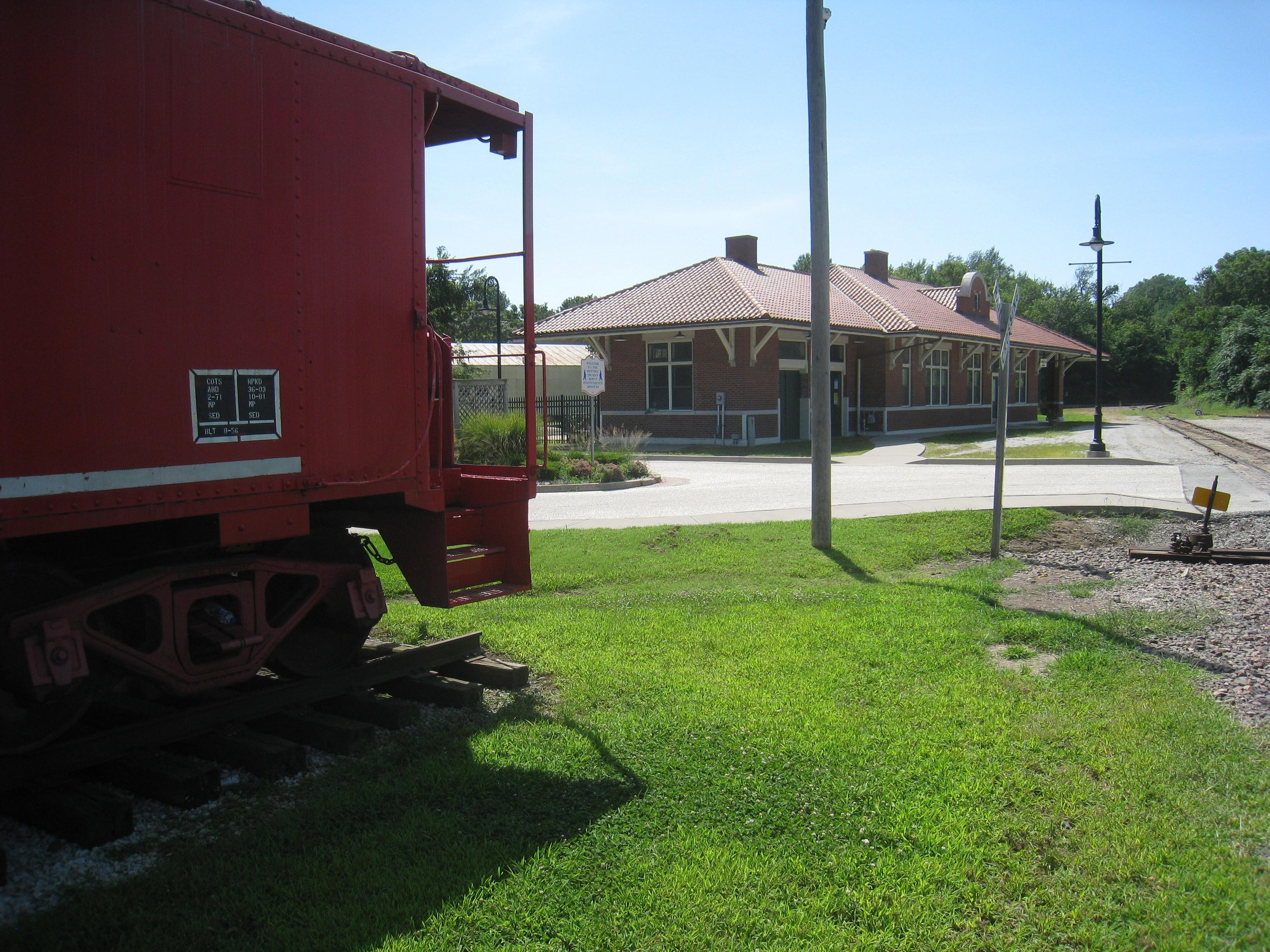
- The "Historic Truman Depot" located in central Independence, Missouri. The Red Caboose partially visible at left is a permanent part of the site.

General information
- Location: 1111 West Pacific Avenue; Independence, Missouri; United States
- Coordinates: 39°5′12.26″N 94°25′46.38″W
- Owner: Union Pacific Railroad
- Platforms: 1 side platform
- Tracks: 2

Construction
- Parking: Yes
- Accessible: Yes

Other information
- Station code: Amtrak: IDP

History
- Opened: 1913
- Rebuilt: 1995

Passengers
- FY 2025: 6,875 (Amtrak)

Services
Preceding station	Amtrak	Following station
Kansas City Terminus	Missouri River Runner	Lee's Summit toward St. Louis
Former services
Preceding station	Missouri Pacific Railroad	Following station
Kansas City Terminus	Main Line	Unity Village toward St. Louis
- Missouri Pacific Depot
- U.S. National Register of Historic Places
- Interactive map of Missouri Pacific Depot
- Architect: Missouri Pacific Railroad
- NRHP reference No.: 79001365
- Added to NRHP: January 22, 1979
Location

Independence station, also known as Missouri Pacific Depot, is an Amtrak train station in Independence, Missouri, United States. The station was originally built in 1913 by the Missouri Pacific Railroad, and is also known as the "Truman Depot", because it was the final stop in Harry S. Truman's 1948 Whistlestop Campaign and where 8,500 admirers welcomed Truman home in January 1953 after leaving office. The depot has since become an Amtrak stop and is home to the Jackson County Genealogical Society Research Library. The station was added to the National Register of Historic Places in 1979.

== See also ==
- List of Amtrak stations
