= Connie J. Cierpiot =

American politician

Connie J. Cierpiot (born June 6, 1953) is an American politician.

Born in Kansas City, Missouri, Cierpiot graduated from Cardinal Glennon High School in 1971. Cierpiot was involved with church/ministry work, volunteer service. Cierpiot served in the Missouri House of Representatives from 1994 to 2002 as a Republican. Cierpiot is married to Mike Cierpiot, who is also serving in the Missouri House of Representatives.
