= Michael Scott (Missouri politician) =

American politician

Member-elect of the Missouri House of Representatives from the 35th district
- Assuming office January 6, 2027
- Succeeding: Keri Ingle

Personal details
- Party: Democratic
- Website: Campaign website

Michael Scott is an American politician of the Missouri Democratic Party who is the representative-elect for the 35th district in the Missouri House of Representatives. He was elected in the 2026 general election. Scott serves as Pastor.
