= Jon Patterson =

American politician

Speaker of the Missouri House of Representatives
- Incumbent
- Assumed office January 8, 2025
- Preceded by: Dean Plocher
- Succeeded by: to be elected

Majority Leader of the Missouri House of Representatives
- In office January 4, 2023 – January 8, 2025
- Preceded by: Dean Plocher
- Succeeded by: Alex Riley

Member of the Missouri House of Representatives from the 30th district
- In office January 2019 – January 2027
- Preceded by: Mike Cierpiot
- Succeeded by: Kevin Grover (elect)

Personal details
- Born: Blue Springs, Missouri, U.S.
- Party: Republican
- Education: University of Missouri (BS, MD)

Jonathan Patterson is an American politician and former surgeon serving as Speaker of the Missouri House of Representatives since 2025. A Republican, he has represented the 30th district, covering part of Lee's Summit, since 2019, and served as House majority leader from 2023 to 2025. He is the first Asian American to serve as Speaker of the Missouri House, the first Speaker from Jackson County in more than 160 years, and the first physician to hold the office in 140 years. In 2026 Patterson won the Republican primary for the Missouri Senate's 8th district.

== Early life and education ==
Patterson graduated from Blue Springs High School in 1998. He earned a bachelor's degree in biology from the University of Missouri in 2002 and a medical degree from the same institution in 2006.

== Medical career ==
Patterson completed a surgical residency at Truman Medical Center in Kansas City and practiced general surgery in eastern Jackson County from 2011 to 2022.

== Legislative career ==
Patterson was first elected to the House in November 2018, succeeding Mike Cierpiot. He was elected majority floor leader for the 2023 session and became speaker-elect in 2023.

In January 2025 the House elected Patterson speaker over Representative Justin Sparks by a vote of 152 to 10, with Democratic members supporting him. Patterson characterized the intraparty challenge as unrelated to policy. In his opening address he identified as priorities legislation to help cities recruit and retain police officers and measures clarifying Amendment 3, the 2024 constitutional amendment establishing a right to abortion. He said he did not support repealing the amendment, and did not support rolling back Proposition A, the 2024 measure raising the minimum wage and requiring paid sick leave.

In May 2025, Patterson praised the legislature for passing measures to reverse the abortion amendment and paid sick leave provisions passed by a majority of Missouri voters in the previous year.

In September 2025, Patterson voted against a mid-decade redistricting map that would gerrymander Jackson county's congressional representation.

== 2026 Senate campaign ==
In 2026 Patterson ran for Missouri's 8th Senate district, an open seat created by the term limiting of Mike Cierpiot, whom Patterson had succeeded in the House in 2019. He won the August 4 Republican primary, defeating former state representative Dan Stacy with 62 percent of the vote to Stacy's 37 percent. The district covers Lee's Summit and Blue Springs. In the general election he was defeated by Keri Ingle.

== Electoral history ==
Missouri House of Representatives Primary Election, August 7, 2018, District 30
| Party | Candidate | Votes | % | ±% |
|---|---|---|---|---|
| Republican | Jon Patterson | 2,565 | 55.13% | |
| Republican | Christ Hankins | 1,626 | 34.95% | |
| Republican | James Lowman | 462 | 9.93% | |
| Total votes | | 4,653 | 100.00% | |

Missouri House of Representatives Election, November 6, 2018, District 30
| Party | Candidate | Votes | % | ±% |
|---|---|---|---|---|
| Republican | Jon Patterson | 9,162 | 51.69% | |
| Democratic | Ryana Parks-Shaw | 8,069 | 45.52% | |
| Libertarian | Brad Eichstadt | 494 | 2.79% | |
| Total votes | | 17,725 | 100.00% | |

Missouri House of Representatives Election, November 3, 2020, District 30
| Party | Candidate | Votes | % | ±% |
|---|---|---|---|---|
| Republican | Jon Patterson | 12,850 | 57.26% | +5.57 |
| Democratic | Art Schaaf | 9,591 | 42.74% | −2.78 |
| Total votes | | 22,441 | 100.00% | |

Missouri House of Representatives Election, November 8, 2022, District 30
| Party | Candidate | Votes | % | ±% |
|---|---|---|---|---|
| Republican | Jon Patterson | 8,599 | 54.28% | −2.98 |
| Democratic | Sonia Nizami | 7,242 | 45.72% | +2.98 |
| Total votes | | 15,841 | 100.00% | |

Missouri House of Representatives
| Preceded by Dean Plocher | Majority Leader of the Missouri House of Representatives; 2023–2025 | Succeeded by Alex Riley |
Political offices
| Preceded by Dean Plocher | Speaker of the Missouri House of Representatives; 2025–present | Incumbent |
