= Keri Ingle =

American politician (born 1984)

Member of the Missouri House of Representatives from the 35th district
- Incumbent
- Assumed office January 9, 2019
- Preceded by: Gary L. Cross
- Succeeded by: Michael Scott (elect)

Personal details
- Born: July 11, 1984 (age 42)
- Party: Democratic
- Education: University of Central Oklahoma (BA); University of Kansas (MSW)
- Website: keriingle.com

Keri Lynn Ingle (born July 11, 1984) is a Democratic member of the Missouri General Assembly representing the State's 35th House district.

== Career ==
Rep. Ingle earned a BA in Criminal Justice from the University of Central Oklahoma, and a Masters in Social Work from the University of Kansas. Rep. Ingle is a Licensed Master Social Worker in Missouri and Kansas. Rep. Ingle has worked in child welfare as the adoption specialist for the Jackson County Children's Division, as well as in schools, hospitals, and mental health facilities.

Ingle won the election on 6 November 2018 from the platform of Democratic Party. She secured 53% of the vote while her closest rival Republican Tom Lovell secured 47%.

She was the Democratic (thus minority) whip in the Missouri house.

Ingle was re-elected on 3 November 2020 from the platform of Democratic Party. She secured 54.5% of the vote while her closet rival Republican Sean Smith secured 45.5%.

At the 2026 Missouri State Senate election, she was elected in Missouri's 8th Senate district against Speaker of the House Jon Patterson.

== Electoral history ==
- Keri Ingle has not yet had any opponents in the Democratic Party, thus getting nominated each time by default.

Missouri House of Representatives Election, November 6, 2018, District 35
Party	Candidate	Votes	%	±%
Democratic	Keri Ingle	9,111	53.17%	
Republican	Tom Lovell	8,024	46.83%	
Total votes		17,135	100.00%	

Missouri House of Representatives Election, November 3, 2020, District 35
Party	Candidate	Votes	%	±%
Democratic	Keri Ingle	11,620	54.50%	+1.33
Republican	Sean Smith	9,701	45.50%	−1.33
Total votes		21,321	100.00%	

Missouri House of Representatives Election, November 8, 2022, District 35
Party	Candidate	Votes	%	±%
Democratic	Keri Ingle	8,869	57.18%	+2.68
Republican	John Burrows	6,642	42.82%	−2.68
Total votes		15,511	100.00%	
