= OATS Transit =

American transport company

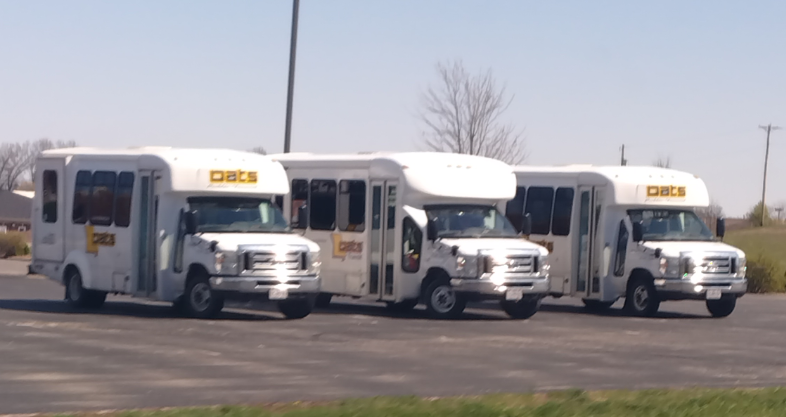
- OATS Transit vans in Troy, Missouri, 2024
- Trade name: OATS Transit Inc.
- Industry: Transport
- Founded: 1970; 56 years ago, in Macon, Missouri
- Area served: Missouri
- Key people: Dorothy Yeager (executive director)
- Services: Transportation
- Number of employees: 560
- Website: oatstransit.org

OATS Transit Inc. (OATS an initialism for operating above the standard) is an American 501(c) private not-for-profit road transport corporation, which operates in all 114 counties of Missouri.

== History ==
OATS was founded in 1970 in Macon, Missouri as a private company. It started with five drivers serving eight counties. The first vans were used in November 1971, starting out with only three. In 1973, they were changed into a nonprofit.

During the COVID-19 pandemic, they suspended their services in St. Louis County and St. Charles County, and later provided free rides for people to get the COVID-19 vaccine. On July 1, 2023, they stopped accepting cash payments, instead requiring riders to pay online, for $2 for a one-way ride.

On April 29, 2024, they cancelled fares in Jefferson City due to a driver shortage.

OATS is partially funded by the Government of Missouri. In 2025, its funding was cut.
