= Prairie Township, Jackson County, Missouri =

Inactive township in the US state of Missouri

Coordinates: 38°54′50″N 94°21′12″W

Prairie Township is an inactive township in Jackson County, in the U.S. state of Missouri.

Prairie Township was established in 1860, taking its name from the prairie within its borders.

The township included Lee's Summit and parts of what is now Unity Village (corresponding with what was previously known as Knobtown village). An atlas showing the townships of Jackson County in 1930 is on page 2 at

- (Jackson County, circa 1930): https://web.archive.org/web/20180912112150/http://cdm.sos.mo.gov/cdm/ref/collection/moplatbooks/id/1537
