= Mike Cierpiot =

Republican member of the Missouri Senate

Member of the Missouri Senate from the 8th district
- Incumbent
- Assumed office November 7, 2017
- Preceded by: Will Kraus

Majority Leader of the Missouri House of Representatives
- In office August 2015 – November 2017
- Succeeded by: Rob Vescovo

Member of the Missouri House of Representatives from the 30th district
- In office January 5, 2011 – November 7, 2017
- Preceded by: Brian Yates
- Succeeded by: Jon Patterson

Personal details
- Born: January 14, 1953 (age 73) Kansas City, Missouri, U.S.
- Party: Republican
- Spouse: Connie J. Cierpiot
- Children: 2
- Education: University of Missouri–Kansas City
- Occupation: Politician
- Profession: Network engineer

Mike Cierpiot (born January 14, 1953) is an American politician. He is a member of the Missouri Senate from the 8th district, serving since 2018. He previously represented the 30th district in the Missouri House of Representatives from 2010 to 2018. He is a member of the Republican Party.

== Political career ==
Cierpiot served in the Missouri House of Representatives from 2011 until 2017. From 2011 to 2013, he represented District 56. From 2013 to 2017, he represented District 30. Before becoming a representative, he was a committee member of the Jackson County Republican Party from 1993 to 2003. Due to Missouri's term limits, Cierpiot term as a state representative ended in 2018.

In November after the 2012 election, Cierpiot was selected by House Republicans as the Assistant Majority Floor Leader. In August 2015, Cierpiot was selected by House Republicans as the Majority Floor Leader.

In November 2017, Cierpiot won a special election to the Missouri Senate 50-42% in District 8.

=== Political views ===
Cierpiot describes himself as a conservative, and favors reducing government restrictions on business. He has expressed support for the use of tax incentives in an attempt to attract business to Missouri. He has expressed concern that western cities in Missouri are losing jobs to Kansas.

On September 12, 2012, Cierpiot controversially voted to overturn Governor Jay Nixon's veto of SB749. The bill allowed health insurance providers to refuse to provide coverage for contraception based on moral convictions.

In 2012, Cierpiot endorsed the Missouri Public Prayer Amendment to the state constitution, which was approved by Missouri voters on August 7, 2012.

In 2014, Cierpiot voted in favor of reducing income taxes on individuals in Missouri, and against the use of red light cameras in the state.

Cierpiot sponsored bills in 2024 and 2025 to allow utility companies to charge residents on projected rates, rather than historic rates. The Consumers Council of Missouri estimated that bills could increase more than 10% under the legislation Watch groups noted that Cierpoit's chief of staff is married to a Spire lobbyist, suggesting a conflict of interest. Mike Kehoe signed the bill into law in April 2025.

=== Legislative assignments ===
In addition to his position as Assistant Majority Floor Leader, Mike Cierpiot is an ex officio member of all committees of the House, as well as a member of the following committees:

- Elementary And Secondary Education
- Leadership For Missouri Issue Development (vice chair)
- Utilities (communications, energy, environmental and transportation)
- Issue Development Standing Committee On Cowboy Caucus On Agricultural Issues
- Missouri Sportsman Issue Development
- Joint Committee on Missouri's Promise
- Oral Health Issue Development

== Electoral history ==
=== State representative ===
Missouri House of Representatives Election, November 2, 2010, District 56
Party	Candidate	Votes	%	±%
Republican	Mike Cierpiot	10,370	63.40%	+0.84
Democratic	Dave Coffman	5,986	36.60%	−0.84

2012 General Election for Missouri’s 30th District House of Representatives
Party	Candidate	Votes	%	±%
Republican	Mike Cierpiot	11,335	60.81%	−2.59
Democratic	Shere Alam	7,306	39.19%	+2.59

Missouri House of Representatives Election, November 4, 2014, District 30
Party	Candidate	Votes	%	±%
Republican	Mike Cierpiot	7,329	100.00%	+39.19

Missouri House of Representatives Election, November 8, 2016, District 30
Party	Candidate	Votes	%	±%
Republican	Mike Cierpiot	15,509	100.00%	

=== State Senate ===
Missouri Senate Special Election, November 7, 2017, District 8
Party	Candidate	Votes	%	±%
Republican	Mike Cierpiot	12,852	50.34%	−49.66
Democratic	Hillary Shields	10,872	42.59%	+42.59
Independent	Jacob Turk	1,806	7.07	+7.07

Missouri Senate Primary Election, August 7, 2018, District 8
Party	Candidate	Votes	%	±%
Republican	Mike Cierpiot	16,836	89.02%	
Republican	Leonard Jonas Hughes IV	2,076	10.98%	

Missouri Senate Election, November 6, 2018, District 8
Party	Candidate	Votes	%	±%
Republican	Mike Cierpiot	41,150	54.66%	+4.32
Democratic	Hillary Shields	34,127	45.34%	+3.75
Total votes		75,277	100.00%	

Missouri Senate Election, November 8, 2022, District 8
Party	Candidate	Votes	%	±%
Republican	Mike Cierpiot	38,018	55.81%	+1.15
Democratic	Antoine Jennings	30,100	44.19%	−1.15
Total votes		68,118	100.00%	

== Personal life ==
Cierpiot was born January 14, 1953, in Kansas City, Missouri. He was educated at Longview Community College and the University of Missouri–Kansas City. He is married to Connie J. Cierpiot, who also served in the Missouri House of Representatives, and they have two sons and two grandchildren.

In addition to his career as a legislator, Cierpiot was once a network engineer for AT&T.

Cierpiot and his family attend First Church of the Nazarene, in Blue Springs.
