= Gary L. Cross =

American politician

Member of the Missouri House of Representatives from the 35th district
- In office 2011 – January 9, 2019
- Succeeded by: Keri Ingle

Personal details
- Born: May 19, 1955 (age 71) Independence, Missouri
- Party: Republican
- Spouse: Jan
- Children: two
- Profession: businessman

Gary L. Cross (born May 19, 1955) is an American politician. He is a former member of the Missouri House of Representatives, having served from 2011 to 2019. He is a member of the Republican Party.

His main legislative agenda involved minors using tanning beds, the principle that taxation should not exist, and attempts to weaken landlord tenant law. He was known for refusing to perform repairs in houses he owned and rented out. One of them on Douglas Street in Lee's Summit was covered in mold in the basement, as well as having as electrical issues that would shock you if you touched the stove and the refrigerator at the same time.
