= Matt Bartle =

Republican politician from Missouri

Matt Bartle (born February 20, 1965) is a Republican politician from Missouri. He was born in Columbia, Missouri.

He received a Bachelor of Arts degree in economics from the University of Missouri, and a J.D. degree from Northwestern University. He is an attorney.

Bartle was first elected to the Missouri House of Representatives in 1998, and remained in that position through 2002. He was elected to the Missouri State Senate in 2002, and w the chair of the Judiciary and Civil and Criminal Jurisprudence Committee, vice chair of the Aging, Families, Mental and Public Health Committee, and as a member of the Transportation Committee and the Commerce, Energy, and the Environment Committee.
