= St. Charles Historic District =

Historic district in Missouri, US

- U.S. National Register of Historic Places
- U.S. Historic district
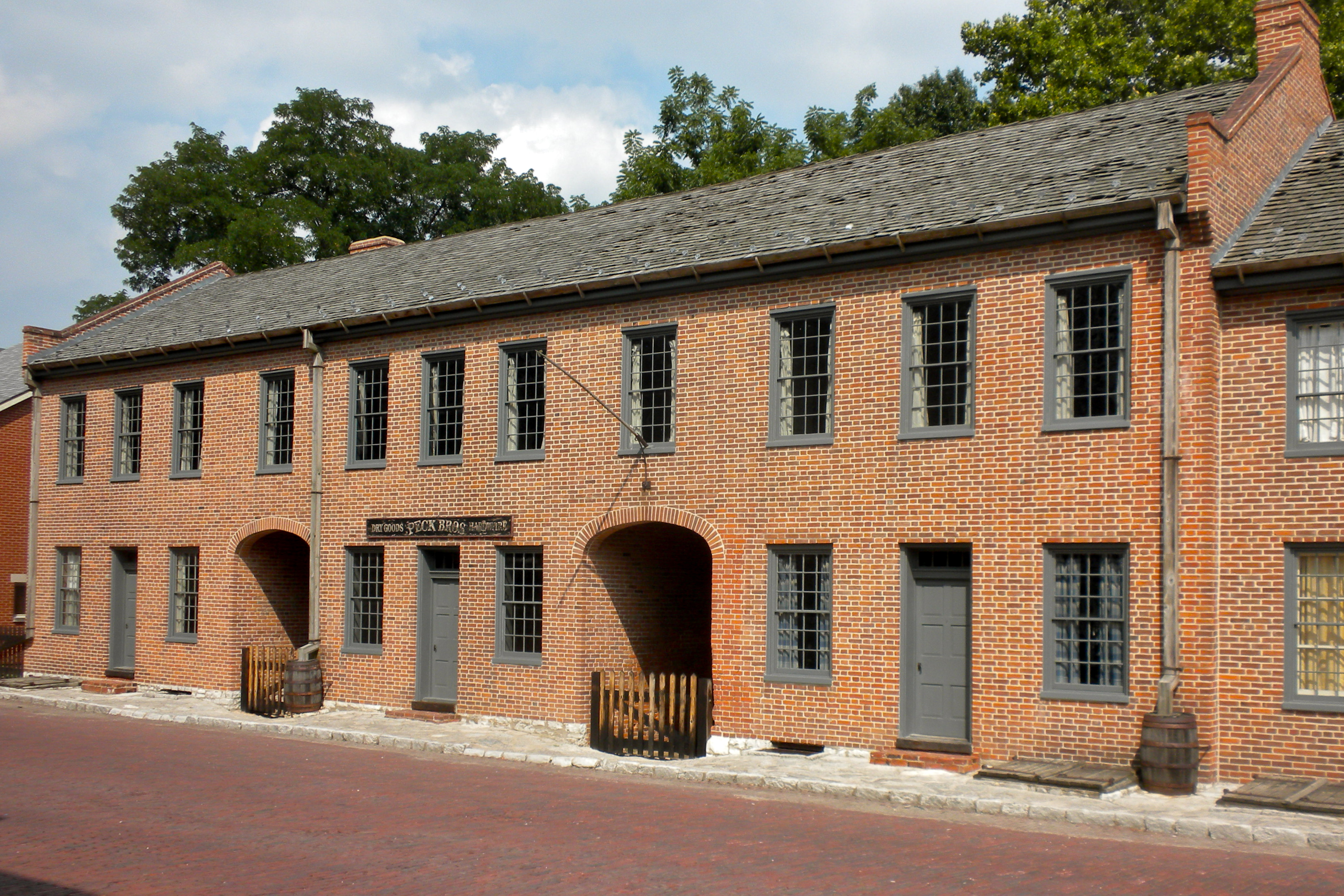

- Location within Missouri Location within the United States
- Location: Roughly bounded by the Missouri River and Madison, Chauncey, and 2nd Sts.; also 1000 S. Main St.; also bounded by Madison, 2nd, Jefferson, and the alley behind the 100 block of S. Main St.; also the 100, 200, and 300 blocks of N. Main St., St. Charles, Missouri
- Coordinates: 38.77904°N 90.48253°W
- Area: 47 acres (19 ha), 1.3 acres (0.53 ha), 3.1 acres (1.3 ha), 9 acres (3.6 ha)
- Architect: Multiple
- Architectural style: Greek Revival; Italianate; Late Victorian; Late 19th and 20th Century Revivals
- NRHP reference No.: 70000856 (original); 87000903 (increase 1); 91000504 (increase 2); 96001087 (increase 3)

Significant dates
- Added to NRHP: September 22, 1970
- Boundary increases: June 4, 1987; May 1, 1991; October 10, 1996

The St. Charles Historic District is a national historic district located at St. Charles, St. Charles County, Missouri, United States. It is the site of the first permanent European settlement on the Missouri River and of the embarkation of Lewis and Clark's journey of exploration along the Missouri. The first state capital of Missouri and over one hundred other historic buildings are located in the district.

== History ==
The St. Charles Historic District was listed on the National Register of Historic Places in 1970, including 63 contributing buildings over a 47-acre (19 ha) area. The district was later increased three times.

The original listing included the separately NRHP-listed First Missouri State Capitol Buildings and the Newbill-McElhiney House. In 1987 the district was increased to include a Greek Revival specialty store building at 1000 S. Main Street, with a 1.3-acre (0.53 ha) area. In 1991 the district was increased by 3.1 acres (1.3 ha) to include 13 more contributing buildings, including work by architects William D. Parsons and H.C. Bode. This included the St. Charles Odd Fellows Hall, the Old City Hall, a post office, and other buildings in late 19th and 20th Century Revivals, Greek Revival, and Late Victorian architectural styles.

In 1996, the district was further increased by 9 acres (3.6 ha) to include 41 more contributing buildings on the 100, 200, and 300 blocks of N. Main Street. These include Greek Revival, Italianate, and late 19th and 20th Century Revivals architecture, including work designed by architects Albert B. Groves and Frank and Adolph Haverkamp.

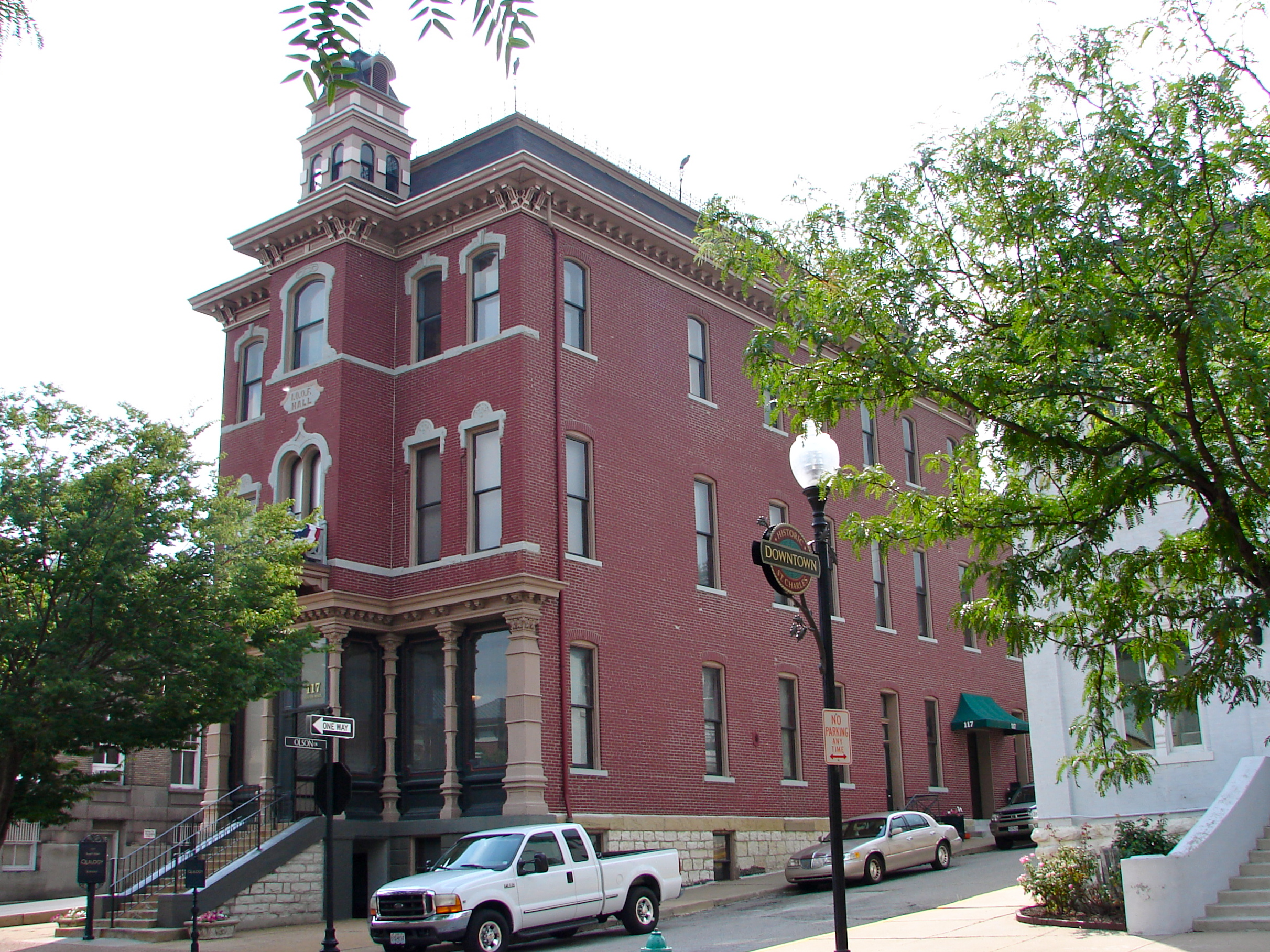
St. Charles Odd Fellows Hall

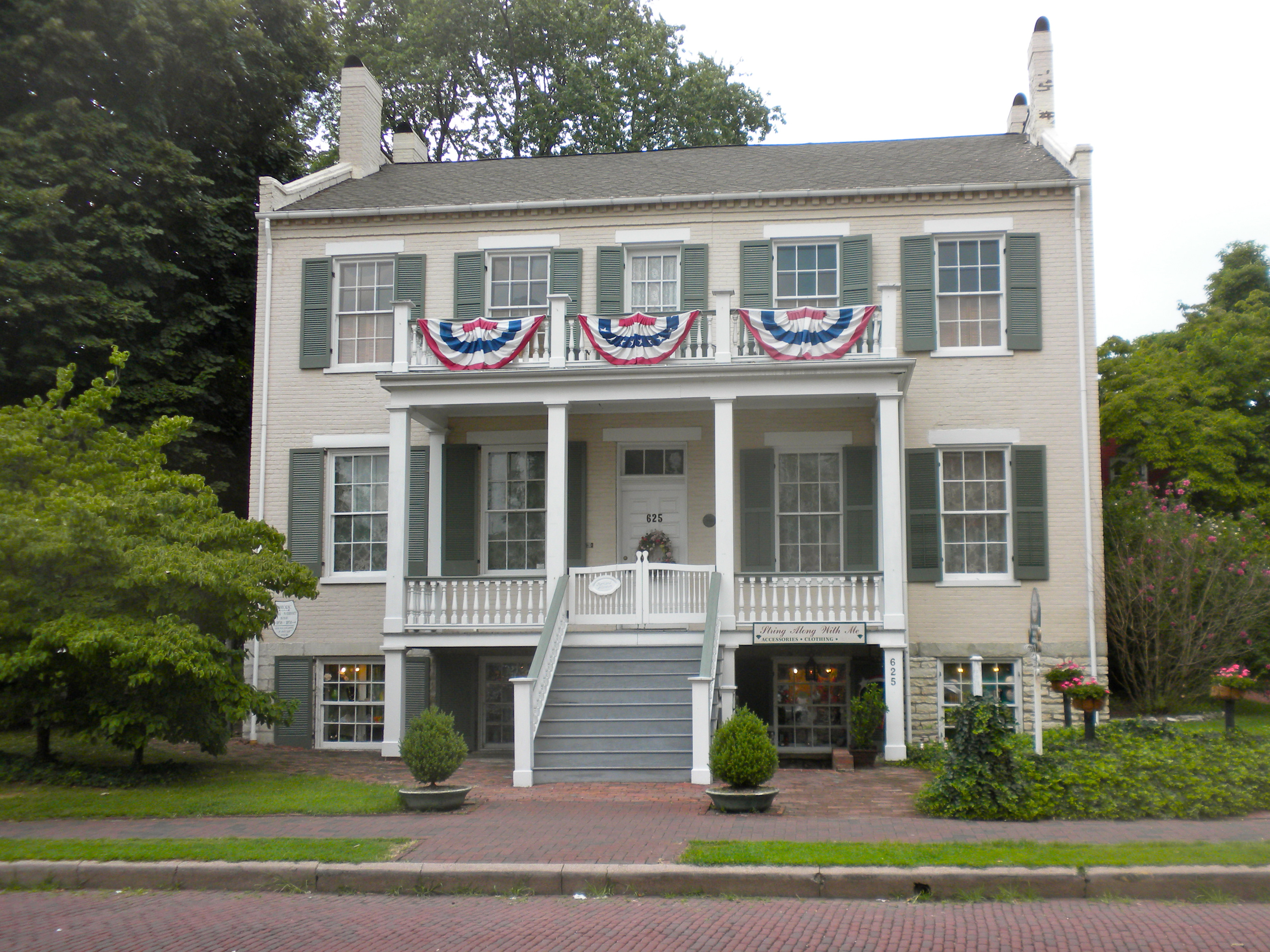
Newbill-McElhiney House

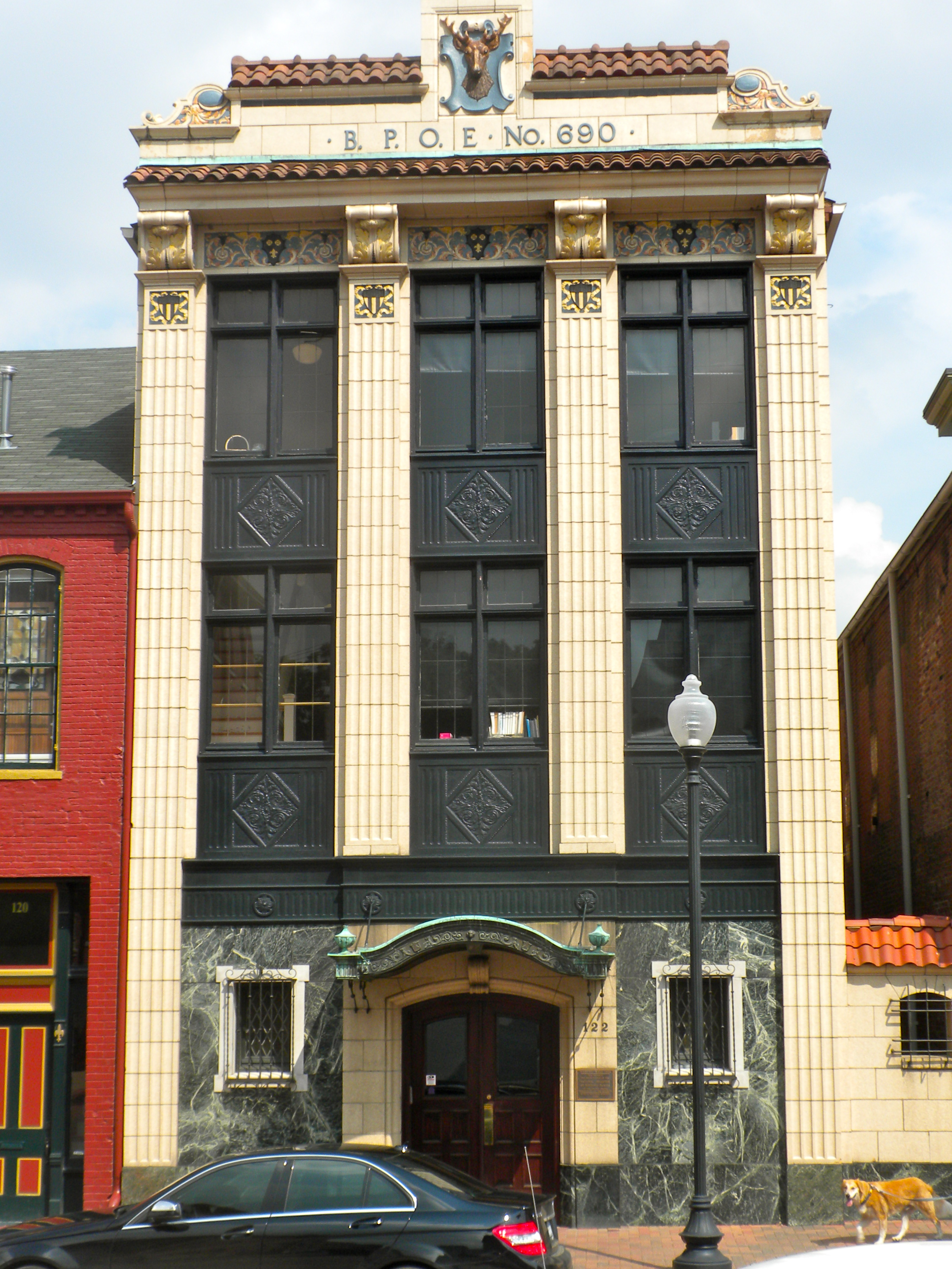
Elks building in the district

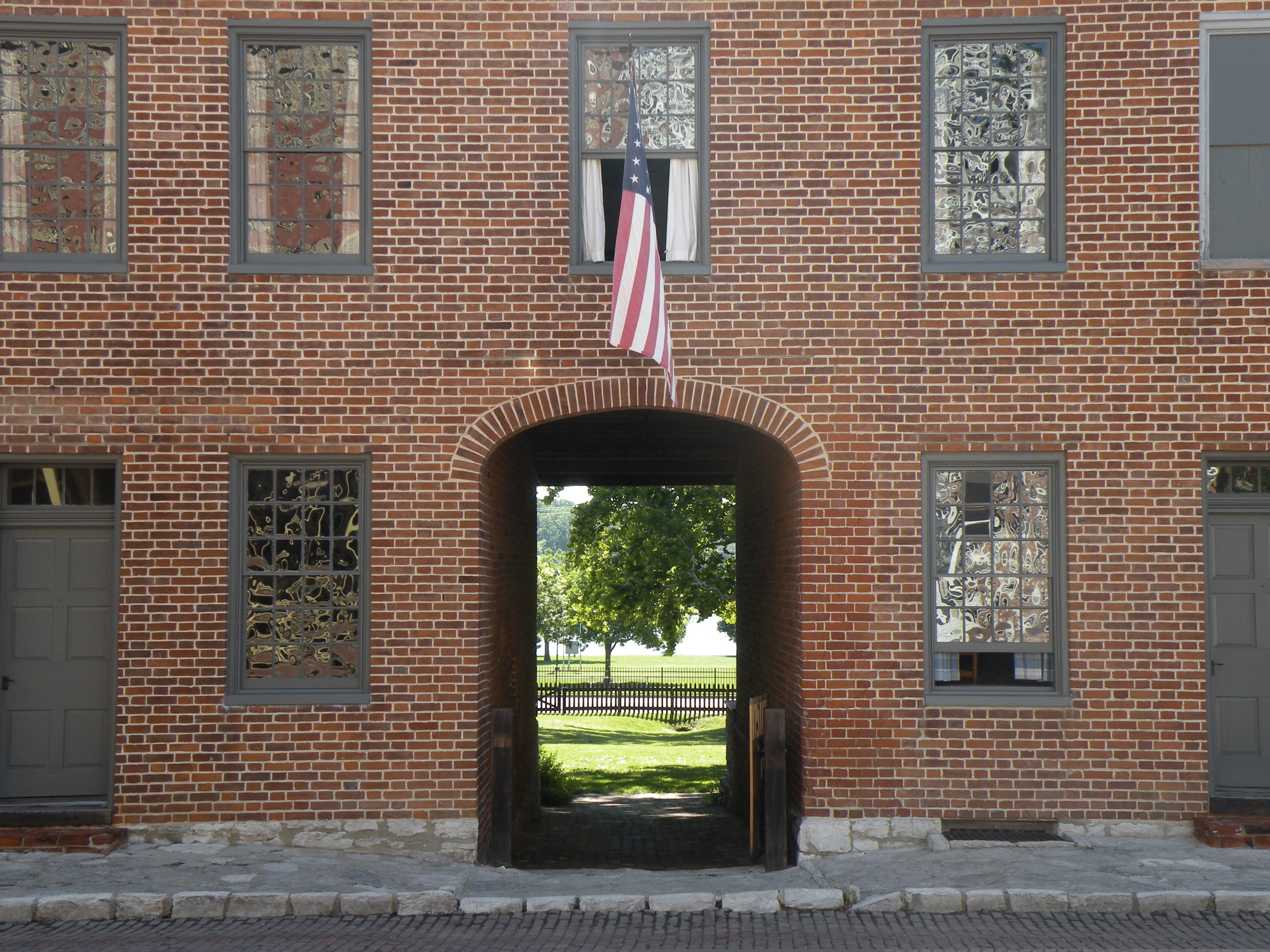
First Missouri State Capitol State Historic Site
