= Chrissy Sommer =

American politician

Member of the Missouri House of Representatives from the 106th district
- In office January 2012 – January 2021
- Preceded by: Sally A. Faith
- Succeeded by: Adam Schwadron

Personal details
- Born: October 15, 1965 (age 60) Kirkwood, Missouri, U.S.
- Party: Republican
- Spouse: Mike Sommer
- Education: St. Louis Community College–Meramec (AA); University of Missouri–St. Louis (BA)

Chrissy Sommer (born October 15, 1965) was an American politician who served as a member of the Missouri House of Representatives for the 106th district from 2012 to 2021. She was first elected to the Missouri House in a special election on November 8, 2011 to fill the vacancy left by the resignation of Sally Faith.

== Early life and education ==
Chrissy Sommer was born in Kirkwood, Missouri. After graduation from Lindbergh High School in 1984 Sommer earned an associate degree in business administration from St. Louis Community College–Meramec. She then furthered her education at the University of Missouri–St. Louis, receiving a Bachelor of Science degree in business administration and business marketing in 1989.

== Career ==
Prior to entering politics, Sommer worked for her family business, Sunset Maintenance Company. She now helps run her husband's CPA firm, Sommer & Associates CPAs LLC and manage a commercial multi-tenant building. She and husband Michael Sommer are the parents of two children.

In April 2011, Sally Faith, the incumbent state representative, won election as mayor of St. Charles, Missouri and resigned from her House seat. Missouri Governor Jay Nixon then called for a special election to fill the remainder of Faiths' term. Chrissy Sommer had been previously involved in local Republican politics, serving in the St. Charles County Republican Central Committee. She was selected by Committee members of the 15th District from three potential Republican candidates to face Democrat Paul Woody and Libertarian Bill Slantz.

In a very close election held on November 8, 2011, Sommer defeated Woody by only 38 votes. Due to the small margin, Woody asked for a recount and Sommer was declared the winner in a recount conducted on Decemberc 14, 2011. The Missouri Secretary of State's office certified that the recount gave Sommer an additional two votes over Democrat Paul Woody for a total of forty votes difference. After the 2010 U.S. Census, all of Missouri's House and Senate districts were redrawn. Effective January 2013 Sommer's home of record will be in the 106th district, which she again ran for and won in the 2014 midterm.

== Elections ==
Missouri House of Representatives, District 106, St. Charles County (2018)
Party	Candidate	Votes	%	±%
Republican	Chrissy Sommer	8,785	57.62%	−1.31
Democratic	Jackie Sclair	6,462	42.38%	+1.31

Missouri House of Representatives — District 106 — St. Charles County (2016)
Party	Candidate	Votes	%	±%
Republican	Chrissy Sommer	10,447	58.93%	−4.77
Democratic	Michael J. Dorwart	7,281	41.07%	+4.77

Missouri House of Representatives — District 106 — St. Charles County (2014)
Party	Candidate	Votes	%	±%
Republican	Chrissy Sommer	5,452	63.70%	+3.46
Democratic	Ken Tucker	3,107	36.30%	−3.46

Missouri House of Representatives — District 106 — St. Charles County (2012)
Party	Candidate	Votes	%	±%
Republican	Chrissy Sommer	9,683	60.24%	+10.95
Democratic	Morton Todd	6,391	39.76%	−8.48

Missouri House of Representatives, District 15, St. Charles County (2011)
Party	Candidate	Votes	%	±%
Republican	Chrissy Sommer	1,875	49.29%	
Democratic	Paul Woody	1,835	48.24%	
Libertarian	Bill Slantz	94	2.47%	
