= St. Charles Odd Fellows Hall =

- U.S. National Register of Historic Places
- U.S. Historic district – Contributing property
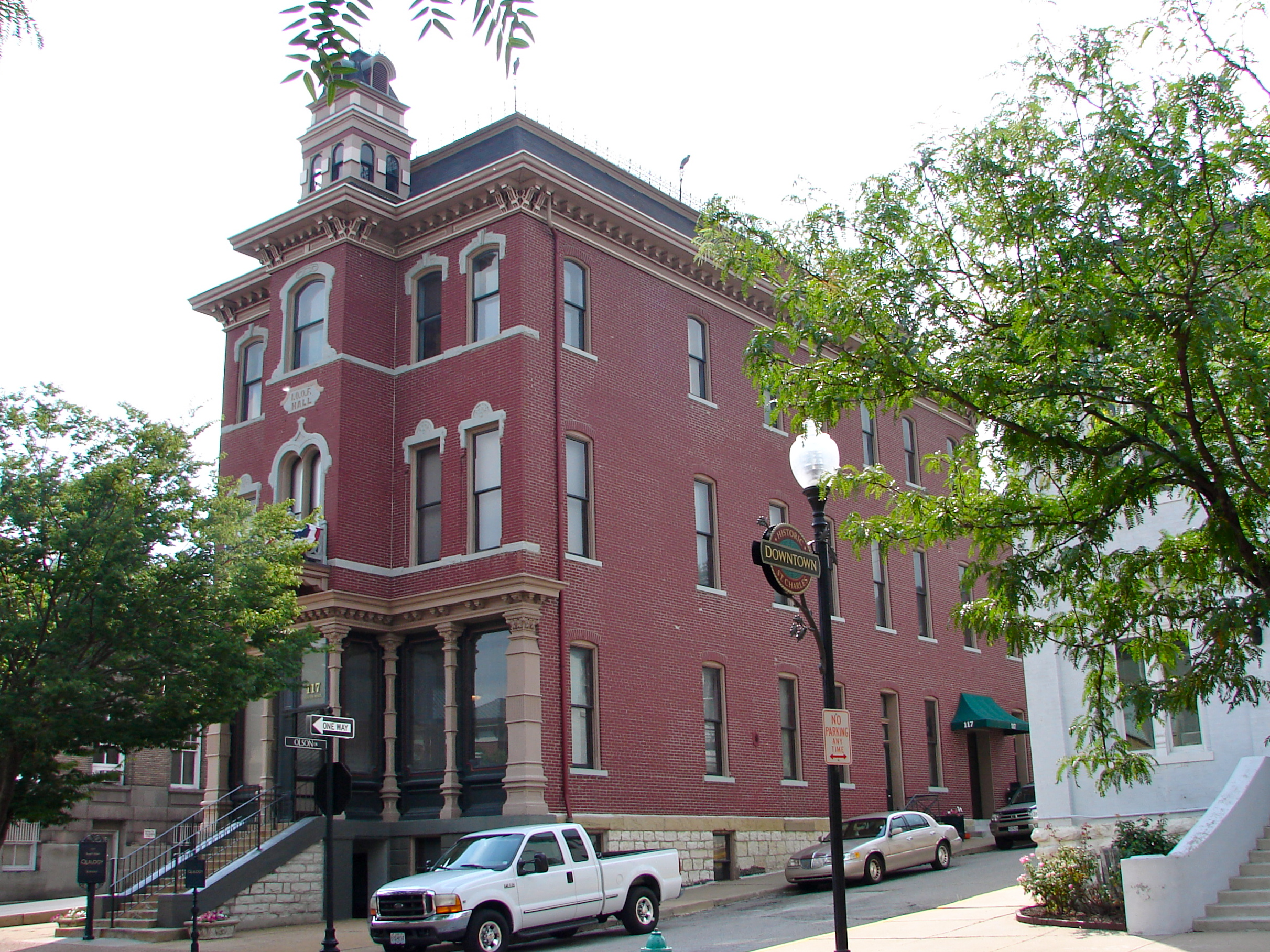
- Photo in 2010

- Location within Missouri Location within the United States
- Location: 117 S. Main, St. Charles, Missouri
- Coordinates: 38°46′50″N 90°28′54″W
- Area: less than one acre
- Built: 1878, 1900
- Architect: Parsons, William D.; McMurray, Smith & Judge
- Architectural style: Second Empire
- NRHP reference No.: 87000569
- Added to NRHP: April 13, 1987

The St. Charles Odd Fellows Hall is historic Odd Fellows hall located at St. Charles, St. Charles County, Missouri. It is a 3 1/2-story, brick Second Empire-styled building that was built in 1878. A small two-story rear addition was constructed about 1900. It served historically as a clubhouse, as an auditorium, and as a financial institution.

It was listed on the National Register of Historic Places in 1987. It is included in the St. Charles Historic District, and is located across from the BPOE No. 690.
