= List of mayors of St. Charles, Missouri =

St. Charles, Missouri mayors

The following is a list of mayors of the city of St. Charles, Missouri, United States of America.

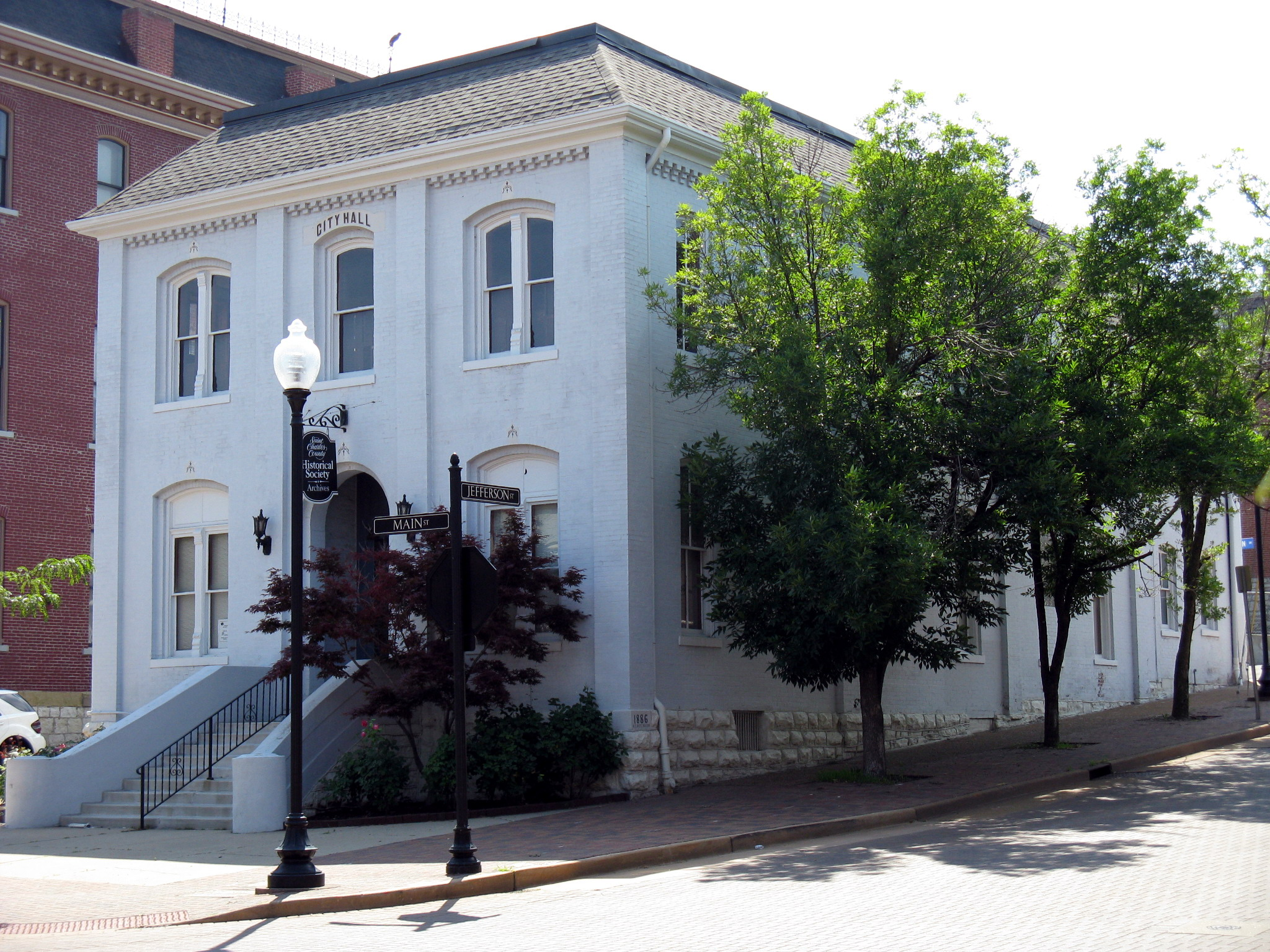
Former city hall building in St. Charles, Missouri (2008 photo)

- Ludwell E. Powell, 1849-1851, 1853-1854, 1859-1860
- Edwin D. Bevitt, 1851-1852
- Frederick W. Gatzweiler, 1852-1853
- Samuel Overall, 1854-1855
- Thomas W. Cunningham, 1855-1856
- W. P. Gibbs, 1856-1857
- John Hilbert, 1857-1859, 1860-1861
- Asa N. Overall, 1861-1862
- Peter Hausam, 1862-1864
- John C. Mittelberger, 1864-1865, 1872-1874
- Charles Hug, 1865-1870
- William A. Alexander, 1870-1872
- Jacob Zeisler, 1874-1878
- Stephen H. Merten, 1878-1880
- Alfred H. Stonebraker, 1880-1882
- Louis H. Breker, 1882-1884
- John F. Hackmann, 1884-1887
- Robert Hund, 1887-1889
- Edward Gut, 1888
- Louis Ringe, 1889-1897, 1905-1907
- Edward Paule, 1897-1901, 1903-1905
- James R. Mudd, 1901-1903
- Henry B. Denker, 1907-1913
- John N. Olson, 1913-1917
- John H. Steinbrinker, 1917-1921
- Frank H. May, 1921-1923, 1929-1931
- Joseph H. Lackland, 1923-1927
- Henry J. Broeker, 1927-1929
- Wayne S. O’Neal, 1931-1935
- Edward J. Schnare, 1935-1937
- Charles H. Kansteiner, 1937-1939
- Francis Knoblauch, 1939
- Adolph Thro, 1939-1945
- Floyd Main, 1945
- Henry Clevenger, 1945-1951
- Henry C. Vogt, 1951-1959, 1963-1971
- Forest Harrington, 1959-1963
- Frank B. Brockreitens, 1971-1979
- Douglas Boschert, 1979-1983
- Melvin G. Wetter, 1983-1987
- Grace Nichols, 1987-1995
- Robert Moeller, 1995-1999
- Patricia York, 1999-2011
- Sally A. Faith, 2011-2019
- Dan Borgmeyer, 2019–present

== See also ==
- Old City Hall (St. Charles, Missouri)
- St. Charles history
