= St. Charles Area Transit =

Transit authority in Missouri, U.S.

- Headquarters: 201 N. Second Street; St. Charles, Missouri
- Service area: St. Charles County, Missouri
- Service type: Bus
- Routes: 5
- Fuel type: Diesel
- Website: SCAT Transit System

St. Charles Area Transit, branding its service as SCAT, is a public transportation service located in St. Charles County, Missouri. The goal of the service is to provide mass transit access for these St. Louis, Missouri suburbs, which are not part of the city's Bi-State Development Agency transportation system. Four local bus routes are provided, plus one commuter route to St. Louis County, Missouri.

== Routes ==
All of these routes converge on St. Charles O'Dell Senior Center.

- I-70 Commuter - St. Joseph's Hospital to North Hanley
- Orange Line - St. Charles Convention Center to 5th & Boone's Lick
- Red Line - 6th & First Capitol to Cunningham & Boone's Lick
- Blue Line - Three Flags Center to St. Charles Convention Center
- Green Line - Hwy 94 & Veterans to First Capitol & Boone's Lick

== Plans ==
St. Charles City Streetcar
The City of St. Charles along with Whittaker Homes have formed a Trolley Committee and having initial talks about the possibility of bringing a streetcar system to the new city development called New Town St. Charles. At least nine PCC streetcars were brought from San Francisco to make the system a reality for the heritage of New Town. The streetcars will run on a seven-mile loop that will connect from New Town to downtown St. Charles.

== Criticism ==
Local environmental groups have been critical that SCAT isn't being serious enough to bring transit into St. Charles County, especially with urban sprawl in St. Charles County that is spilling over into Warren County, the construction of New Town in the floodplains of North St. Charles County, and several attempts by local civic leaders in O'Fallon and Dardenne Prairie to expand their civic plans across U.S. Route 40 into the Busch Wildlife Conservation Area.

Some have argued that St. Charles County resists expanding or integrating their transit system with St. Louis Metro Transit for fear of rising costs and a shift in ridership demographic. A few critics have accused St. Charles County's resistance due to "white flight" and the New Urbanism movement.
