= Newbill-McElhiney House =

Historic house in Missouri, United States

- U.S. National Register of Historic Places
- U.S. Historic district – Contributing property
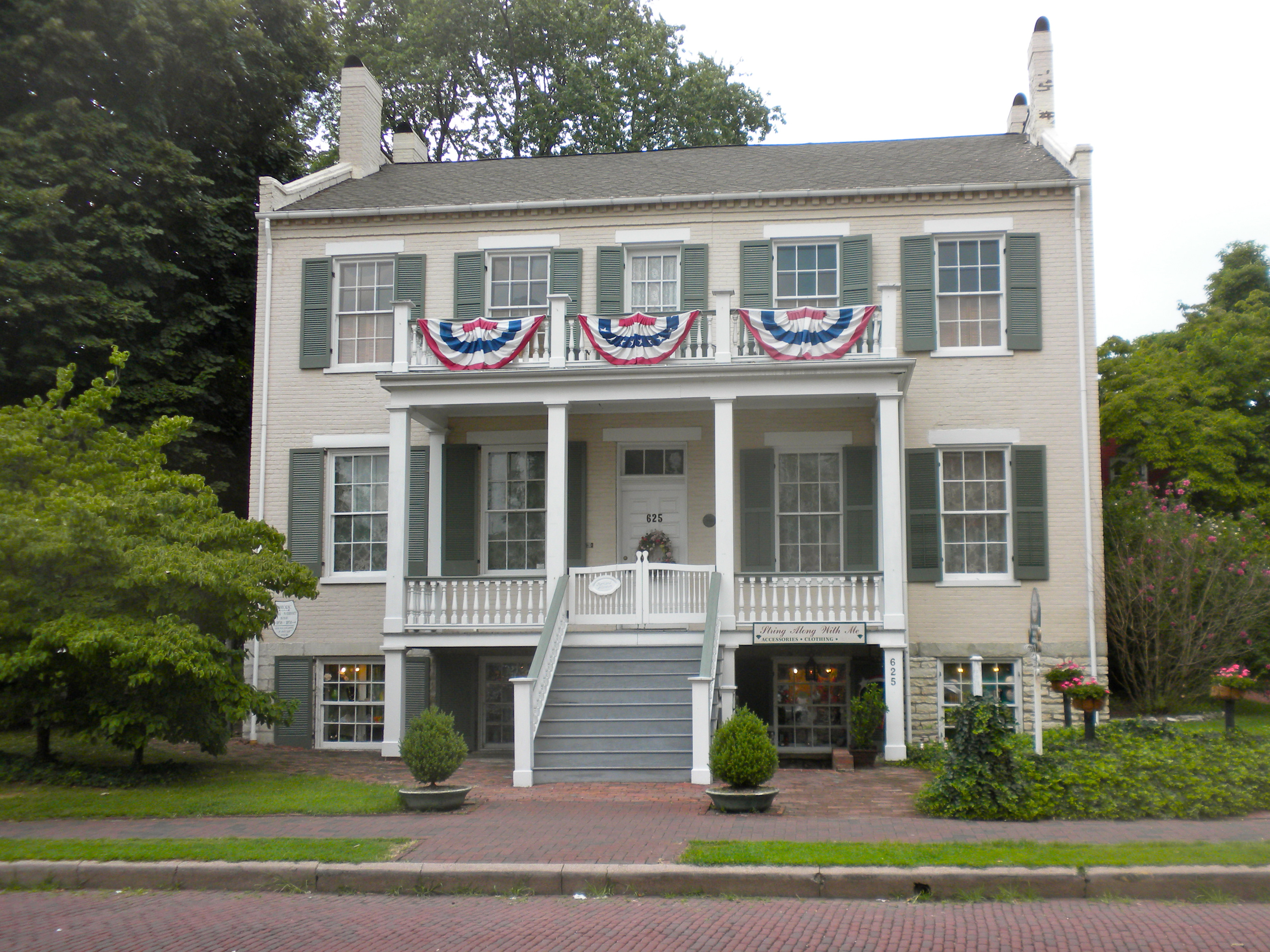
- Newbill-McElhiney House, July 2010

- Location within Missouri Location within the United States
- Location: 625 S. Main St., St. Charles, Missouri
- Coordinates: 38°46′35″N 90°29′2″W
- Area: 9.9 acres (4.0 ha)
- Built: 1836
- Architectural style: Federal
- NRHP reference No.: 72001489
- Added to NRHP: April 11, 1972

Newbill-McElhiney House is a historic home located at St. Charles, St. Charles County, Missouri. The original three-bay section was built in 1836, and expanded to five bays in the 1850s. It is a two-story, five-bay, Federal style brick dwelling. It has a side-gable roof and features a three-bay central porch. Also on the property is a contributing small two-story "L-plan" brick building rumored to have been used as a slave quarters.

It was added to the National Register of Historic Places in 1972. It is located in the St. Charles Historic District.
