= Dan Borgmeyer =

American businessman and mayor

Mayor of Saint Charles, Missouri
- Incumbent
- Assumed office May 7, 2019
- Preceded by: Sally Faith

Personal details
- Party: Republican
- Children: 4
- Education: University of Missouri-St. Louis; Washington University
- Website: danborgmeyerformayor.com

Daniel Borgmeyer is an American businessman and current mayor of St. Charles, Missouri. He is a Vietnam combat veteran who started his own marketing firm known as Borgmeyer Marketing Group in Saint Charles in 1973 with two employees. Borgmeyer was president of the Saint Charles Chamber of Commerce, County Council of Chambers and Saint Charles Cable TV and Tourism Commissions. He was a board member of the Saint Charles County Road Board and East-West Gateway Coordinating Council. He was also on the advisory boards of both Centerre and Frontenac Banks.

== Early life and education ==
Borgmeyer is a fourth generation, lifelong resident of Saint Charles. He graduated from Duchesne High School and attended Washington University in St. Louis and University of Missouri–St. Louis.

== Mayoral term ==
In an interview with KMOV News, Borgmeyer said that he wanted to take a pro-business stance and curb crime during his time as mayor of St. Charles. Borgmeyer also believes that the police force is currently understaffed, saying "As far as I'm concerned we're understaffed police wise I'd like to see the police force expanded They're coming up for contract negotiations, that's an important part of it".

Borgmeyer pushed for the repeal of a controversial St. Charles liquor law that required businesses on North Main Street to make at least 50% of their revenues come from food and not liquor. He says that the requirement does not make the area safer but rather could force some places to close as a result. Borgmeyer also believes that the food requirement is keeping new businesses from coming to North Main. He says that better lighting and more policing have made North Main safer, not the ordinance.

== Electoral history ==
2019 St. Charles mayoral election (officially nonpartisan)
Party	Candidate	Votes	%
Republican	Dan Borgmeyer	4,455	55.33%
Republican	Sally Faith	3,570	44.34%
Write-in	Write-in	27	0.34%

== Personal life ==
Borgmeyer has four children and five grandchildren. He passed down ownership of Borgmeyer Marketing Group to his son Jack. Borgmeyer is Catholic.

== See also ==
- List of mayors of St. Charles, Missouri
