= First Missouri State Capitol State Historic Site =

Historic site in Missouri, United States

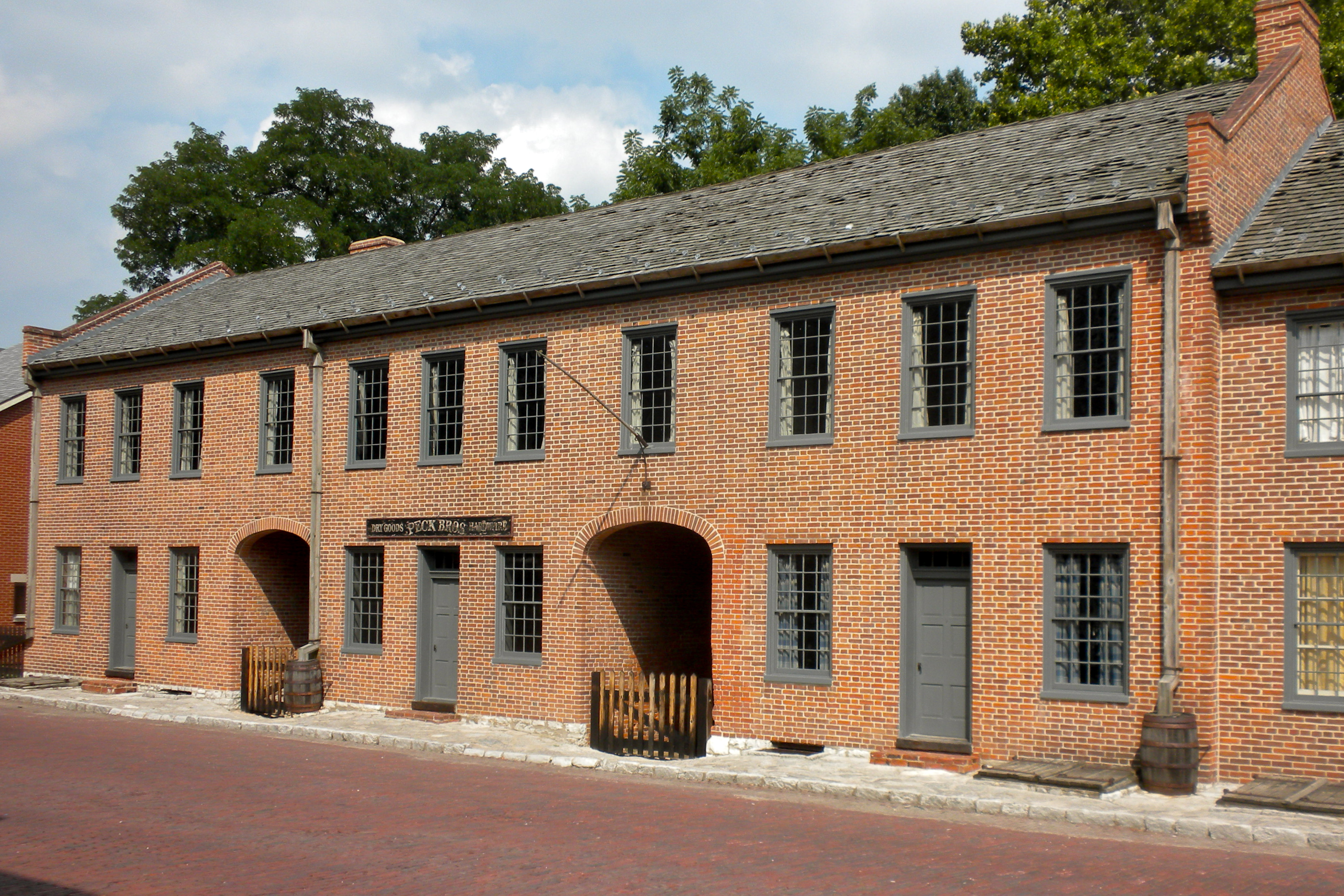
- Missouri's state capitol, 1821–1826

- Location within Missouri Location within the United States
- Location: St. Charles, St. Charles County, Missouri, United States
- Coordinates: 38°46′49″N 90°28′55″W
- Area: 0.66 acres (0.27 ha)
- Established: 1960
- Visitors: 35,403 (in 2022)
- Governing body: Missouri Department of Natural Resources
- Website: First Missouri State Capitol; State Historic Site
- First Missouri State Capitol Buildings
- U.S. National Register of Historic Places
- Location: 208–216 S. Main Street, St. Charles, Missouri
- NRHP reference No.: 69000313
- Added to NRHP: April 16, 1969

The First Missouri State Capitol State Historic Site is a state-owned property in St. Charles, Missouri, preserving the building that served as Missouri's capitol from 1821 to 1826. The site is part of the St. Charles Historic District in the city's Riverfront neighborhood. It was acquired by the state in 1960 and was added to the National Register of Historic Places in 1969. Tours for the historic site are available for a fee daily where visitors can tour the actual rooms where the Missouri government was created. Inside the interpretive center, visitors can visit for free the two floors of exhibits, shop the gift shop, and learn through interpretive programs about the history of Missouri's first state capitol building.

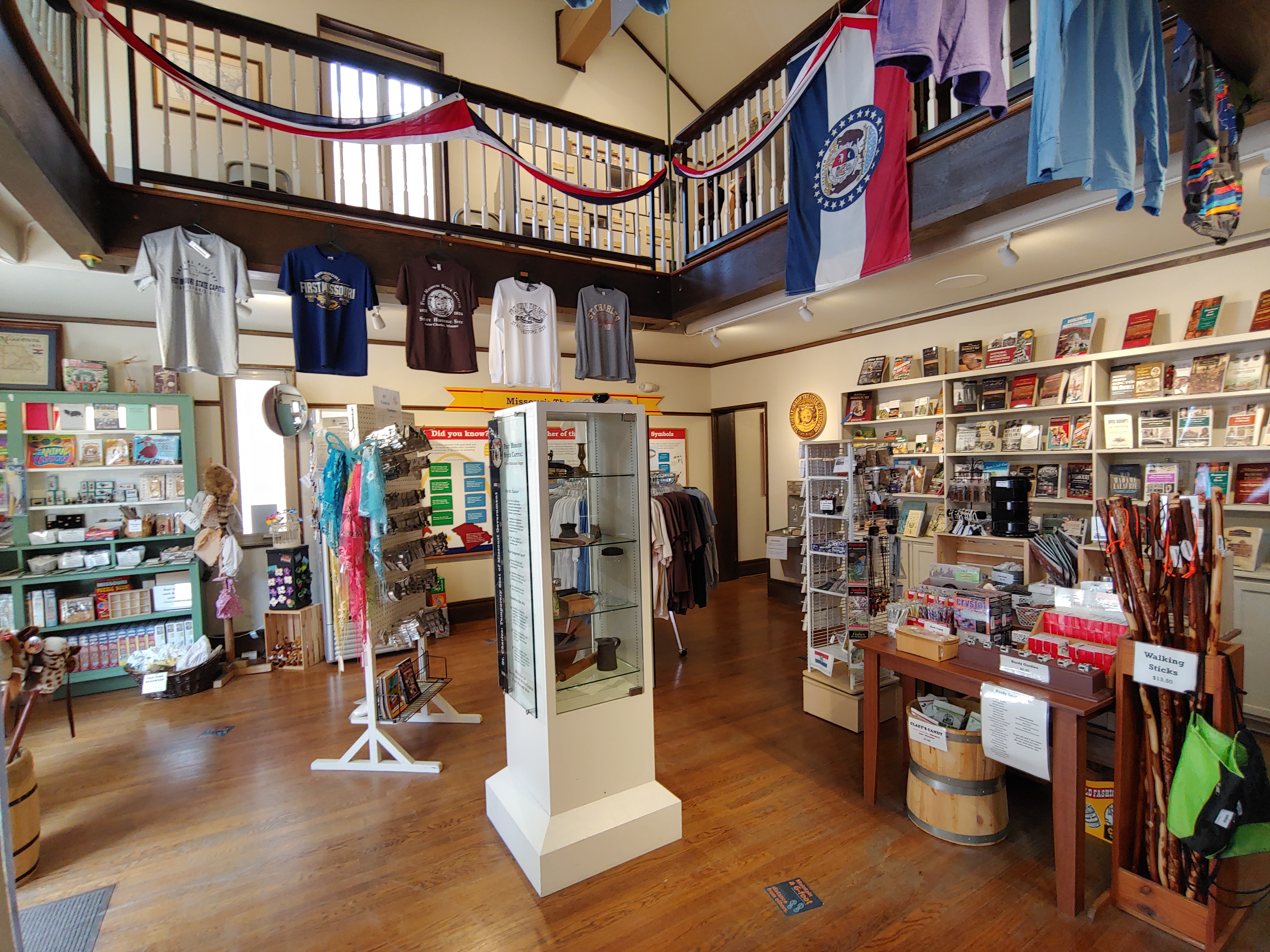
Gift Shop located inside the First Missouri State Capitol Historic Site

The First Missouri State Capitol Buildings consists of four connected brick buildings. They are one room deep with gabled roofs and stone foundations. The first floor of the building was used as a store and residence while the second floor was used by the state government. Both are preserved today.

The building first came into use as the Missouri State Capitol in June 1821, during a special session called by Governor McNair. During a session at the temporary capitol in November 1821, the decision was made to make "the City of Jefferson" the permanent seat of Missouri governance.

== See also ==
- History of Missouri
