= Colin Wellenkamp =

American politician

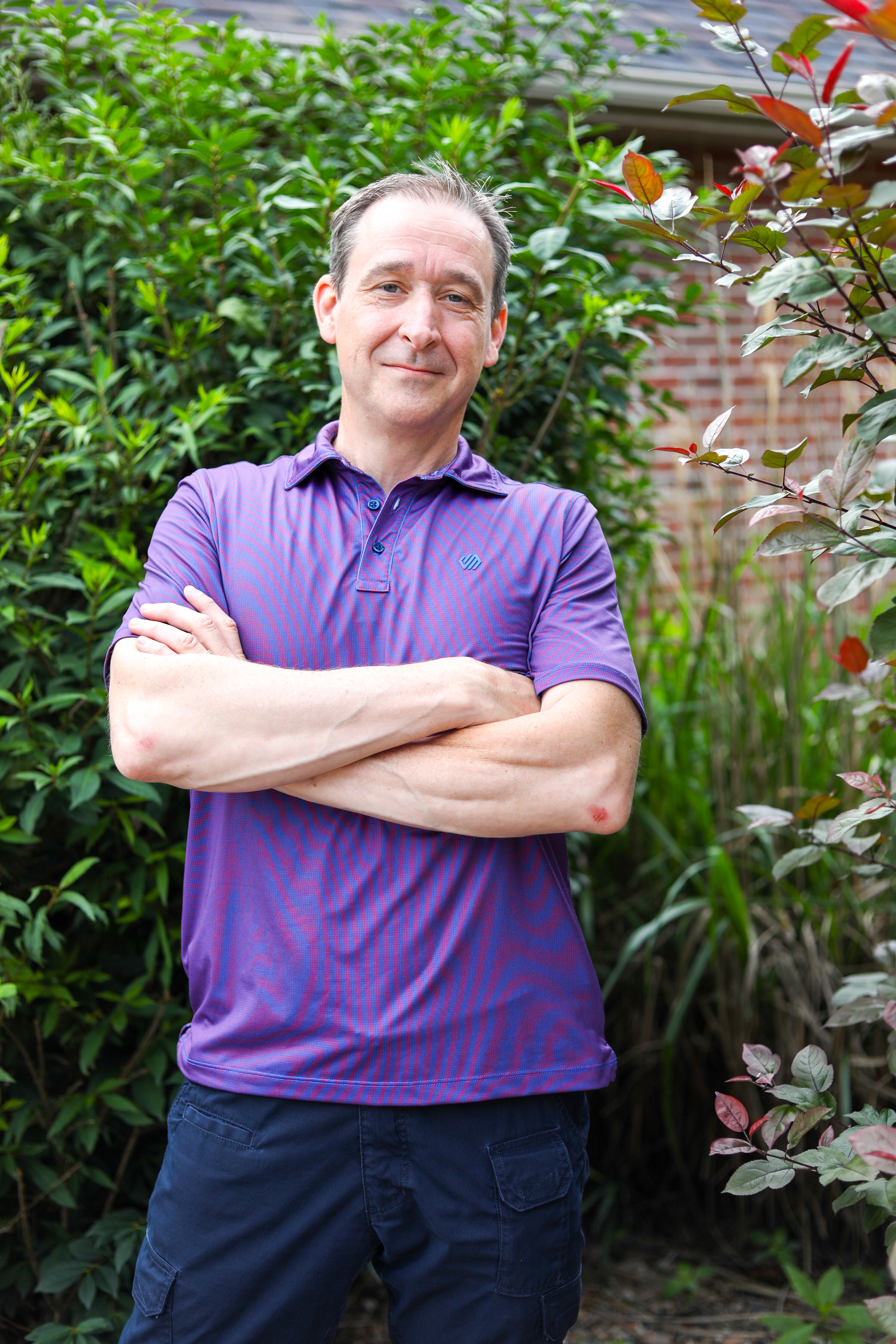

Member of the Missouri House of Representatives from the 105th district
- Incumbent
- Assumed office January 8, 2025
- Preceded by: Adam Schwadron
- Succeeded by: Caterina Clayton (elect)

Personal details
- Born: Kirkwood, Missouri, U.S.
- Party: Republican
- Education: Saint Louis University
- Website: https://colinformo.com/

Colin M. Wellenkamp is an American politician serving as a Republican member of the Missouri House of Representatives from the 105th district since 2025. The district covers part of St. Charles County. He succeeded Adam Schwadron. Wellenkamp is executive director of the Mississippi River Cities & Towns Initiative, an association of municipalities along the Mississippi River, and chairs the Missouri Future Caucus.

== Early life and education ==
Wellenkamp was born in Kirkwood, Missouri, and graduated from Chaminade College Preparatory School in 1995. He earned a bachelor's degree in environmental studies from Saint Louis University in 1999, a Juris Doctor degree from the Creighton University School of Law in 2003, and a graduate degree in sustainable development law from the George Washington University Law School in 2011. He is a descendant of Henry Wellenkamp, an early store owner in Washington, Missouri.

== Career ==
Wellenkamp worked as an environmental scientist. He was an environmental law and compliance assistant at Union Pacific Railroad from 2002 to 2003 and vice president of sustainable partnerships at the Washington Linkage Group from 2003 to 2012. He has taught as an adjunct professor at Washington Adventist University and, since 2018, at Washington University in St. Louis University College, and also teaches at Saint Louis University.

Wellenkamp serves as executive director of the Mississippi River Cities & Towns Initiative, an association of 105 cities across the ten states bordering the Mississippi River.

== Legislative Service ==
In 2026 Wellenkamp sponsored House Bill 3362, which together with Mike Costlow's House Bill 3364 was known as the AI Infrastructure, Grid Integrity, and Water Resource Protection Act. The bills responded to the expansion of data centers and artificial intelligence infrastructure in Missouri.

A 2025 Missouri law required the state's investor-owned electric utilities — Ameren, Evergy and Liberty — to create higher rate schedules for large-load electricity consumers such as data centers. Wellenkamp and Costlow's bills would have extended that requirement to municipally owned utilities and electric cooperatives, mandating a separate rate schedule for customers with an expected annual peak demand of 50 megawatts or more, and proposed comparable measures for water use. Wellenkamp said Missouri was well positioned to attract such development because of its water, power and connectivity, but argued that large users should bear the costs of additional capacity rather than residential and small-business ratepayers.

Both bills received a committee hearing but were not brought to a vote by committee chairman Jeff Farnan, which ended their progress for the session. The bills came amid growing local opposition to data centers in Missouri; St. Charles adopted a permanent ban on data centers, and the issue featured in Republican primary campaigns in 2026.

== Committee Assignments ==
- Conservation and Natural Resources
- Joint Committee on the Life Sciences
- Local Government
- Special Committee on Governmental Affairs

Missouri House of Representatives Election, November 5, 2024, District 105
Party	Candidate	Votes	%	±%
Republican	Colin Wellenkamp	8,178	52.90	
Democratic	Ron Odenthal	7,280	47.10	
Total votes		15,458	100.00	
