= Sally A. Faith =

American politician

Mayor of St. Charles, Missouri
- In office 2011–2019
- Succeeded by: Dan Borgmeyer

Member of the Missouri House of Representatives from the 15th district
- In office 2005–2011
- Preceded by: Thomas Green
- Succeeded by: Chrissy Sommer

Personal details
- Born: July 21, 1945 (age 81) Fresno, California
- Party: Republican

Sally A. Faith (born July 21, 1945) is a not-for-profit fundraiser, former Republican member of the Missouri House of Representatives, and former mayor of St. Charles, Missouri. She has one son, Howard.

She was born in Fresno, California, and is a 1963 graduate of Lee Academy High School. She has since then taken classes at St. Charles Community College, Maryville University's Weekend College, Lindenwood University, and University of Missouri-St. Louis.

She has been director of Development for the St. Charles Community College Foundation, director of Marketing for Whitmoor Country Club, chair and vice chair of St. Charles County Council, District 5. She is a member of the St. Charles Transit Authority, Habitat for Humanity International, Athena Leadership Foundation, St. Charles Rotary Club, and the St. Charles and St. Peters Chambers of Commerce. She serves on the board of directors of Bridgeway, Focus St. Louis, Connections to Success, the New Frontier Bank and Foundry Centre.

She was first elected to the Missouri House of Representatives in 2004. She served on the following committees:

- Appropriations - General Administration,
- Higher Education, and
- Insurance Policy.

She was elected Mayor of St. Charles, Missouri in 2011, at which point she resigned her seat in the Missouri House of Representatives. She was reelected to a second term in April 2015. Her third term reelection bid in April 2019 was unsuccessful.

== See also ==
- List of mayors of St. Charles, Missouri
