= Old City Hall (St. Charles, Missouri) =

- U.S. National Register of Historic Places
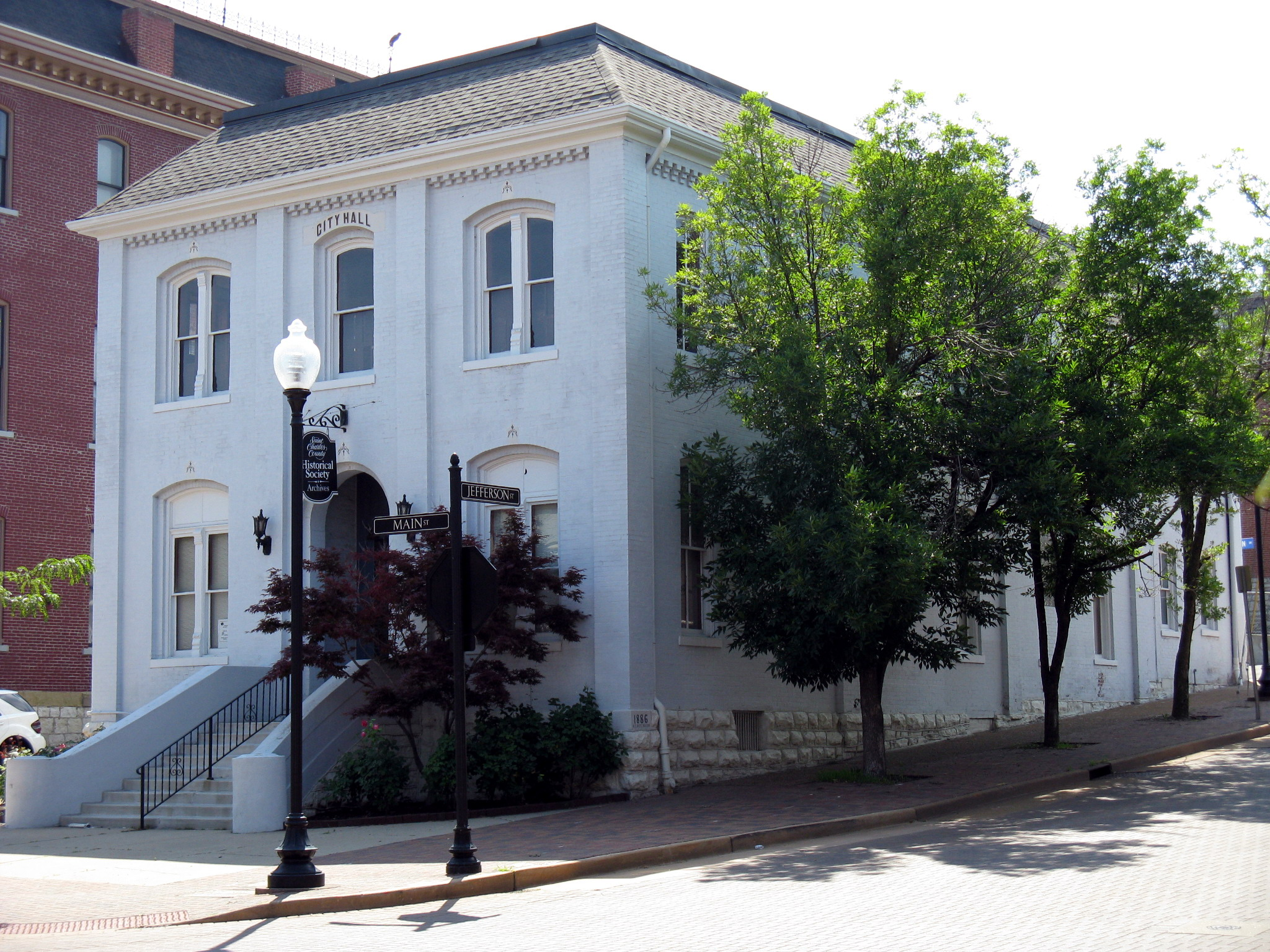
- Old City Hall, June 2008

- Location within Missouri Location within the United States
- Location: Central Ave. and Main St., St. Charles, Missouri
- Coordinates: 38°46′51″N 90°28′54″W
- Area: 0.2 acres (0.081 ha)
- Built: 1832, 1886
- NRHP reference No.: 80004367
- Added to NRHP: November 14, 1980

Old City Hall, also known as the Market House, is a historic city hall located at St. Charles, St. Charles County, Missouri. It was built in 1832 as the Market House, and underwent alterations in 1886. It is a two-story, vernacular brick building on a rockfaced ashlar foundation. It features segmental arched openings, pilasters, and a mansard roof.

It was added to the National Register of Historic Places in 1980.

== See also ==
- List of mayors of St. Charles, Missouri
