= Adam Schwadron =

American politician

Member of the Missouri House of Representatives for 106th district (2021–2023) 105th district (2023–2025)
- In office January 6, 2021 – January 8, 2025
- Preceded by: Chrissy Sommer
- Succeeded by: Colin Wellenkamp

Personal details
- Party: Republican
- Spouse: Elizabeth
- Children: 2
- Education: St. Louis Community College–Meramec (AA); University of Missouri–St. Louis (BA)

Adam Schwadron is an American politician and businessman who served as a member of Missouri House of Representatives from 2021 to 2025, representing the 106th then 105th district. Elected in November 2020, he assumed office on January 6, 2021.

== Early life and education ==
A native of St. Louis, Schwadron attended Ladue Horton Watkins High School. He earned an Associate of Arts in business administration from St. Louis Community College–Meramec and a Bachelor of Arts degree in political science from University of Missouri–St. Louis.

== Career ==
In 2007, Schwadron worked as an account manager for Election Administrators. From 2007 to 2009, he was a territory sales manager for Dyson. He has worked as director of operations for the Clean Carpet Company since 2010. Schwadron was elected to the Missouri House of Representatives in November 2020 and assumed office on January 6, 2021.

In the 2022 Missouri House of Representatives election, he was elected in District 105. District 106 was won by Travis Wilson.

== Electoral history ==
- Rep. Schwadron has not yet had any opponents in the Republican primaries, thus automatically getting nominated each time by default.

Missouri House of Representatives Election, November 3, 2020, District 106
Party	Candidate	Votes	%	±%
Republican	Adam Schwadron	9,620	51.45%	
Democratic	Cindy Berne	9,079	48.55%	
Total votes		18,699	100.00%	

Missouri House of Representatives Election November 8, 2022, District 105
Party	Candidate	Votes	%	±%
Republican	Adam Schwadron	5,404	49.35%	−2.10
Democratic	Cindy Berne	5,305	48.44%	−0.11
Libertarian	Michael Carver	242	2.21%	+2.21
Total votes		10,951	100.00%	
