= St. Charles Convention Center =

Convention center in St. Charles, Missouri, United States

- Interactive map of St. Charles Convention Center
- Location: 1 Convention Center Plaza; St. Charles, Missouri 63303
- Coordinates: 38°46′08″N 90°30′08″W
- Owner: City of Saint Charles, Missouri, St. Charles County Convention & Sports Facilities Authority
- Operator: Spectra Venue Management
- Capacity: 10 to 3,000

Construction
- Opened: April 7, 2005

Tenant
- St. Louis Saints

The St. Charles Convention Center is a convention center in St. Charles, Missouri. It opened in April 2005 and is managed by Oak View Group.

The facility has a 16,200 sq ft (1,510 m^{2}). Grand Ballroom, and 27,600 sq ft (2,560 m^{2}). of Exhibit Hall space expandable to 35,700 sq ft (3,320 m^{2}). through the adjacent Junior Ballroom. The facility features additional meeting rooms, Executive Board Room, and the Compass Café. Other major partners include Coca-Cola, MillerCoors, Yellow Pages, New Frontier Bank, Women's Journals, and Goellner Printing.

== Events ==
The St. Charles Convention Center hosts a variety of events throughout the year, from large consumer shows to dance competitions, conventions to small corporate meetings. Notable annual events include:

- St. Louis Best Bridal
- St. Louis Golf Show
- St. Charles Boat Show
- Working Women's Survival Show
- St. Charles Home & Garden Show
- St. Charles County Annual Mayors Ball
- St. Louis Weapon Collectors Gun & Knife Show
- St. Louis Comicon
- St. Louis Pet Expo
- Anime St. Louis

== Image gallery ==
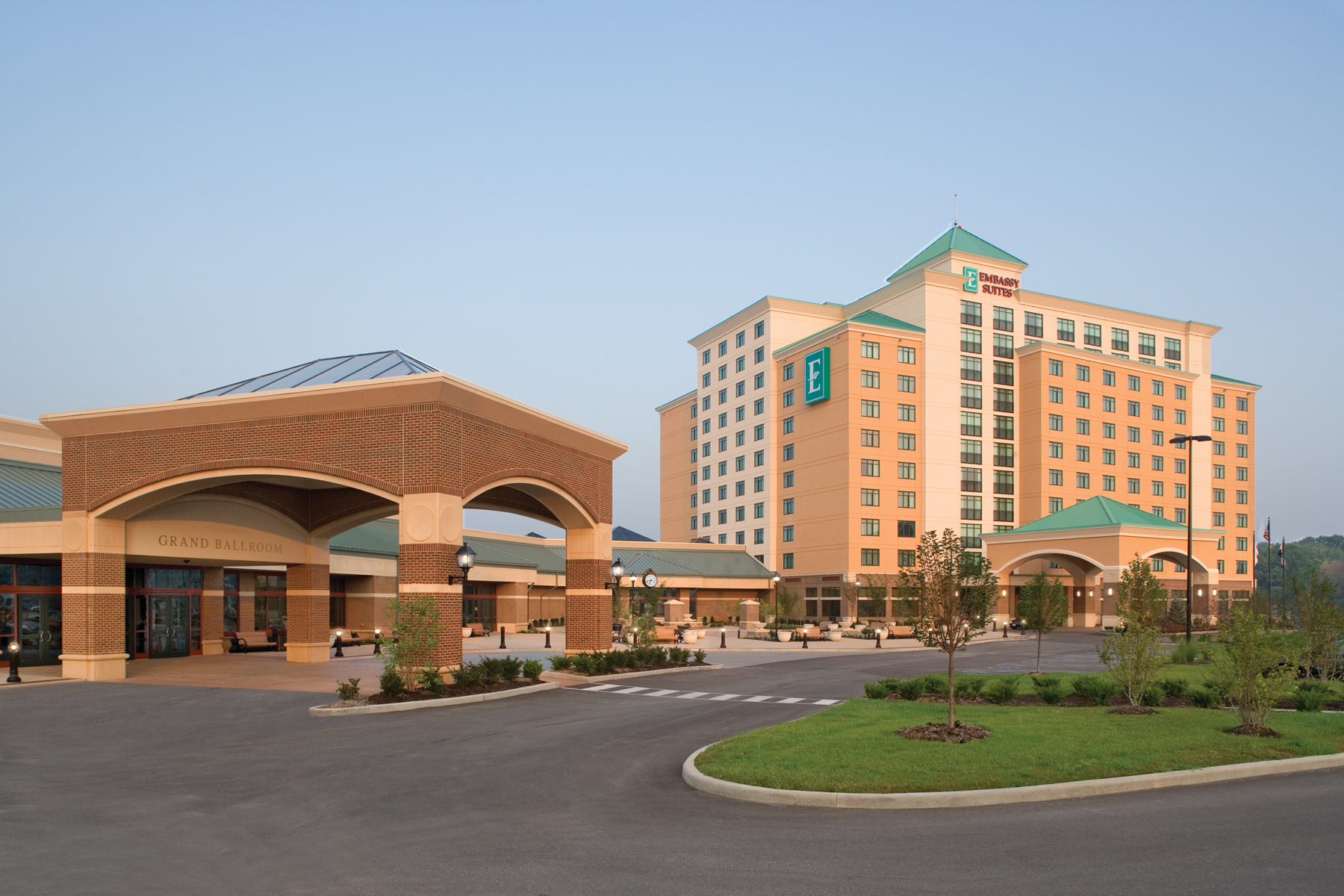
Attached Embassy Suites Hotel
