= St. Charles, Missouri =

City in Missouri, U.S.

- City
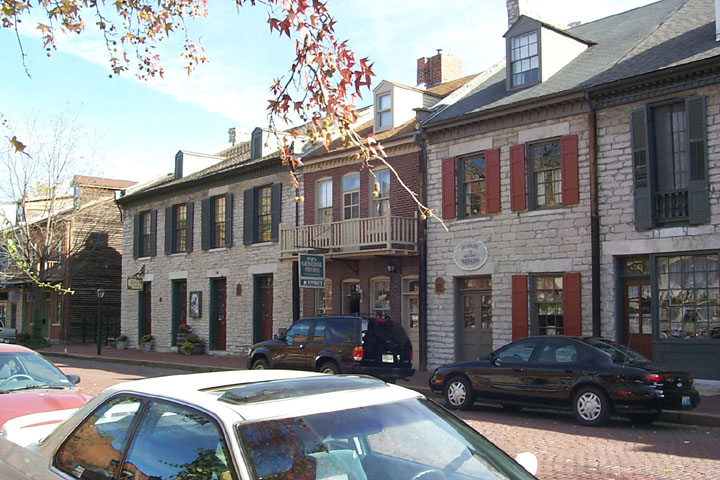
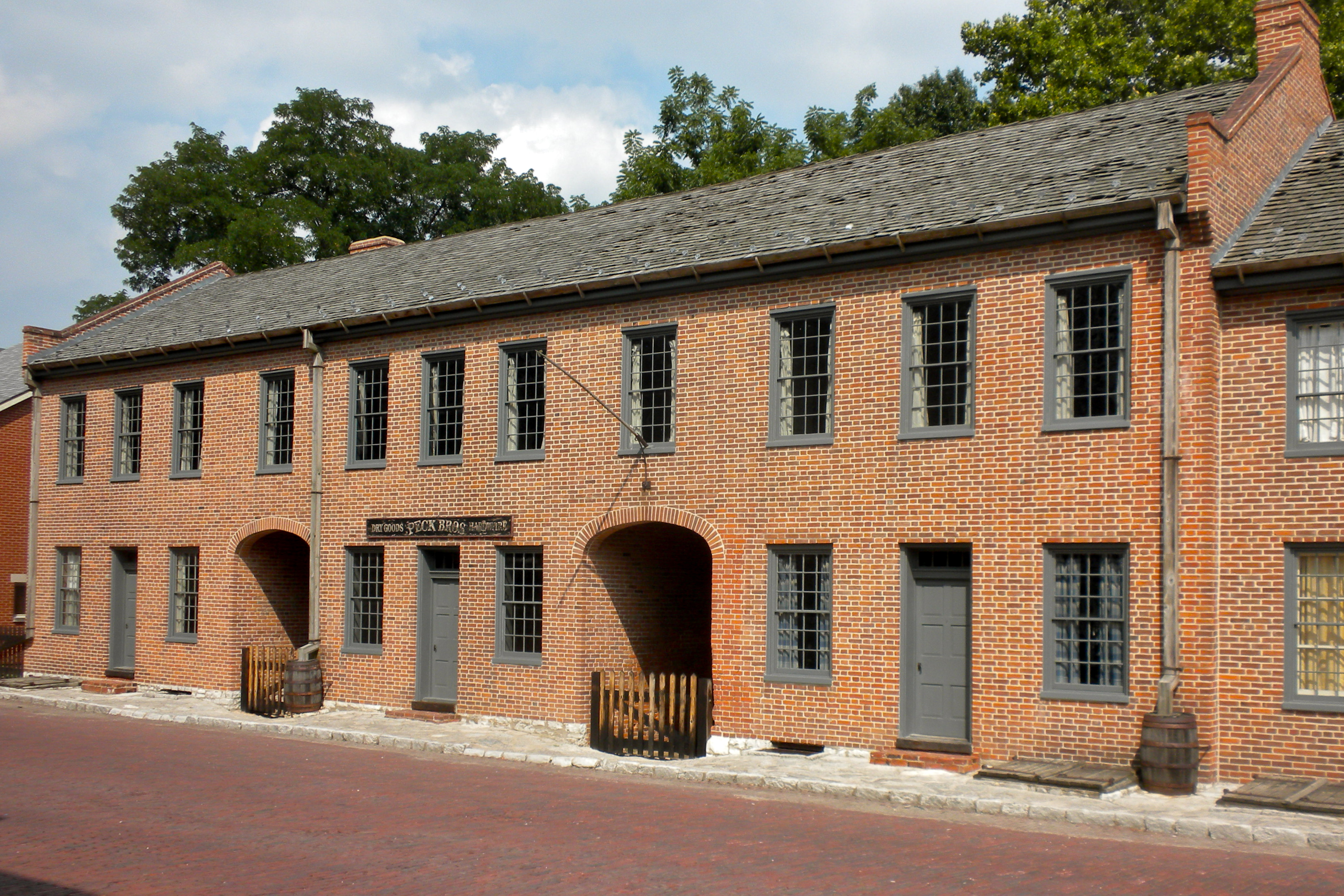
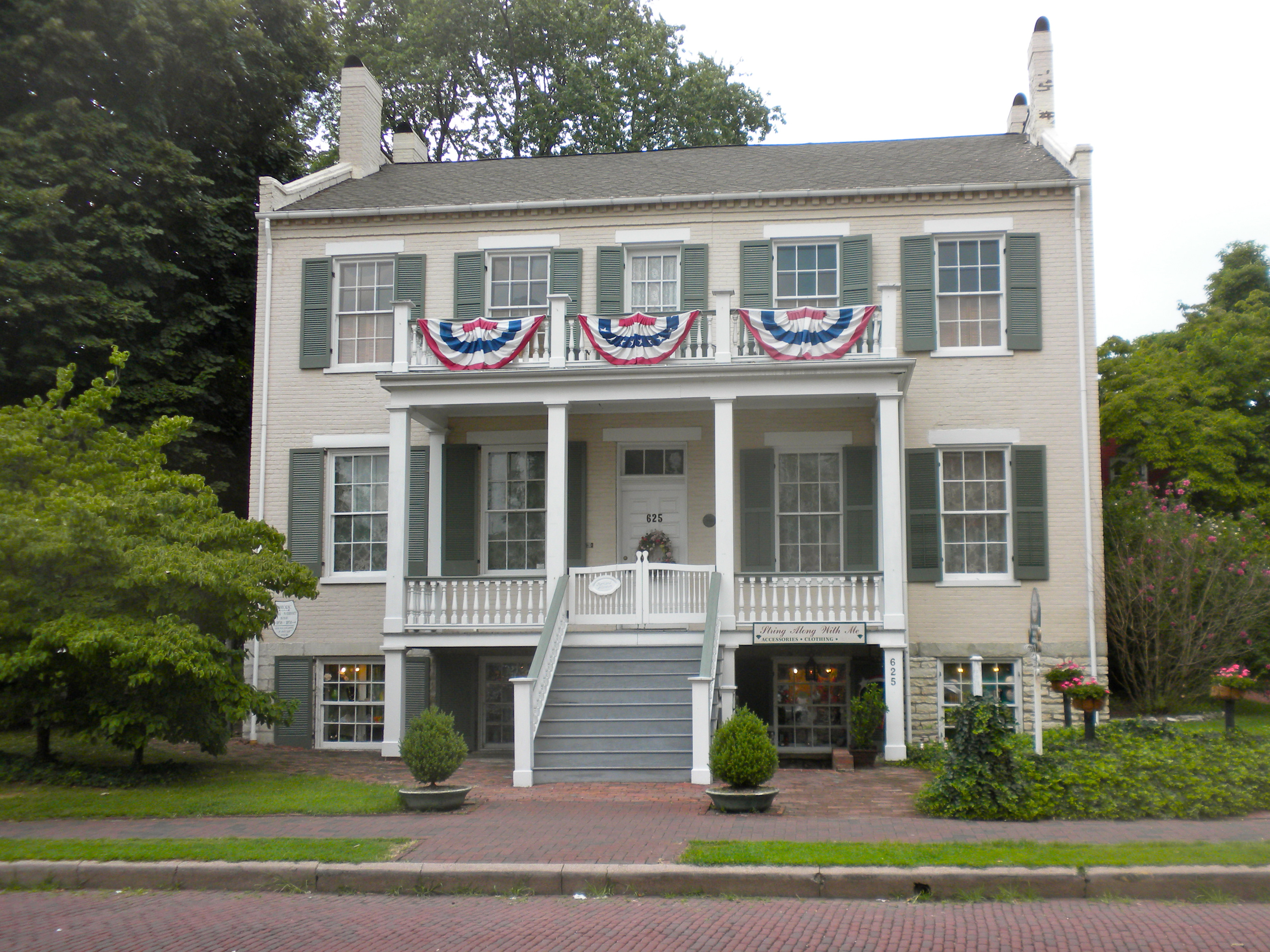
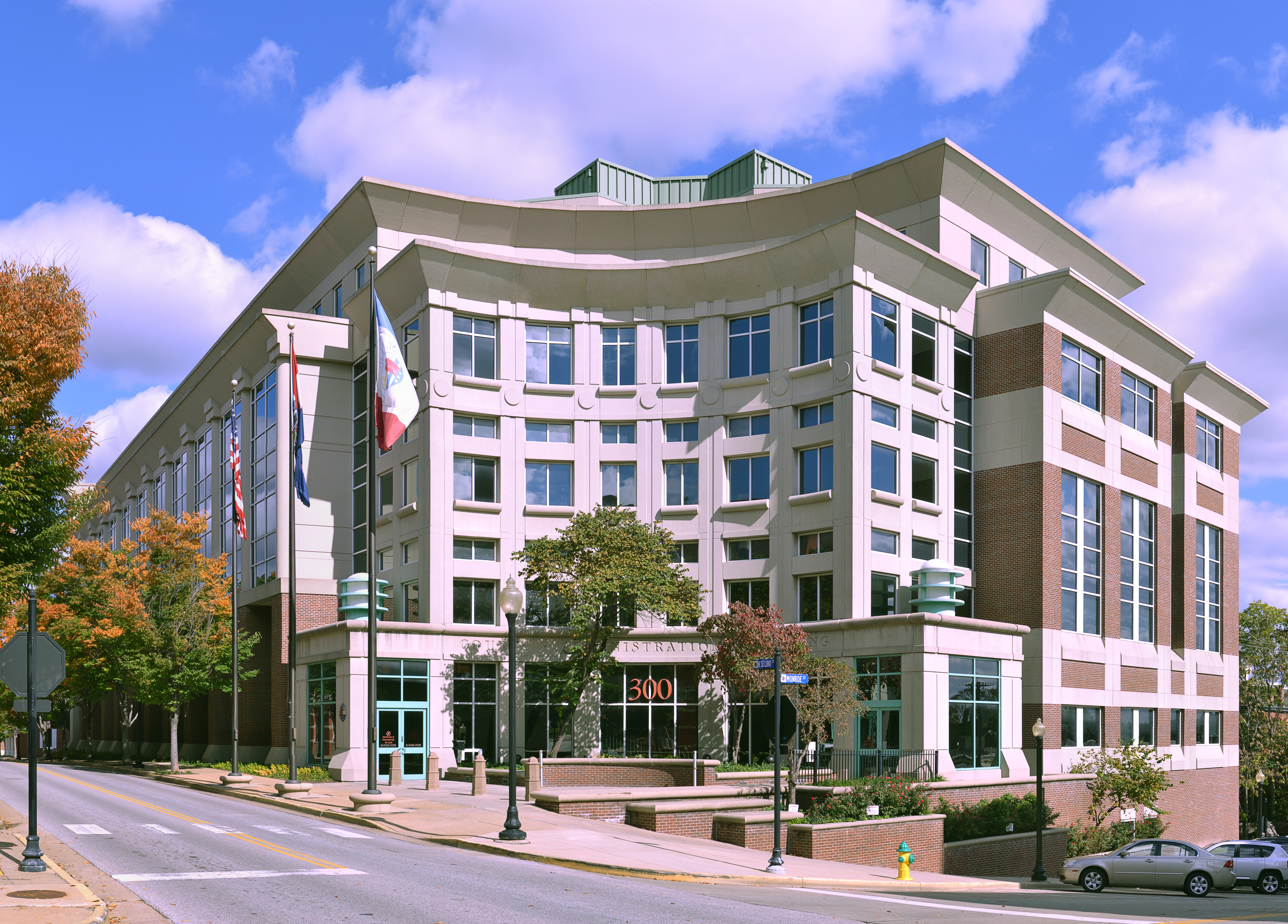
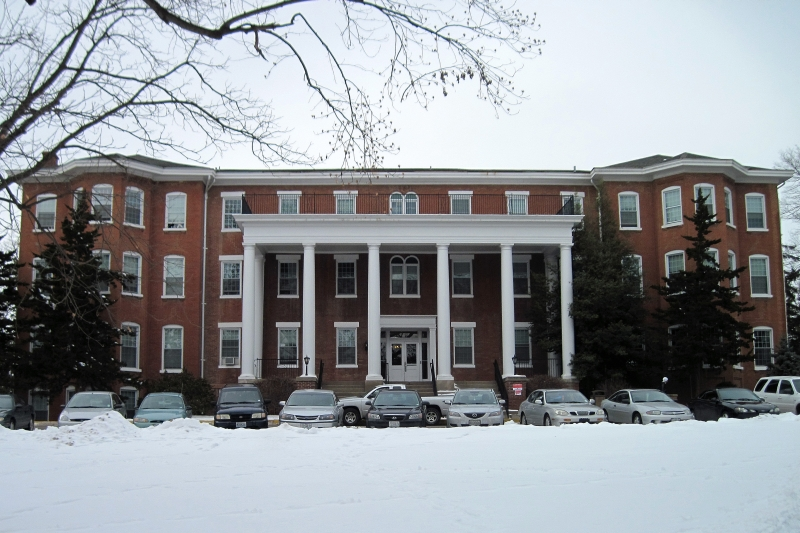
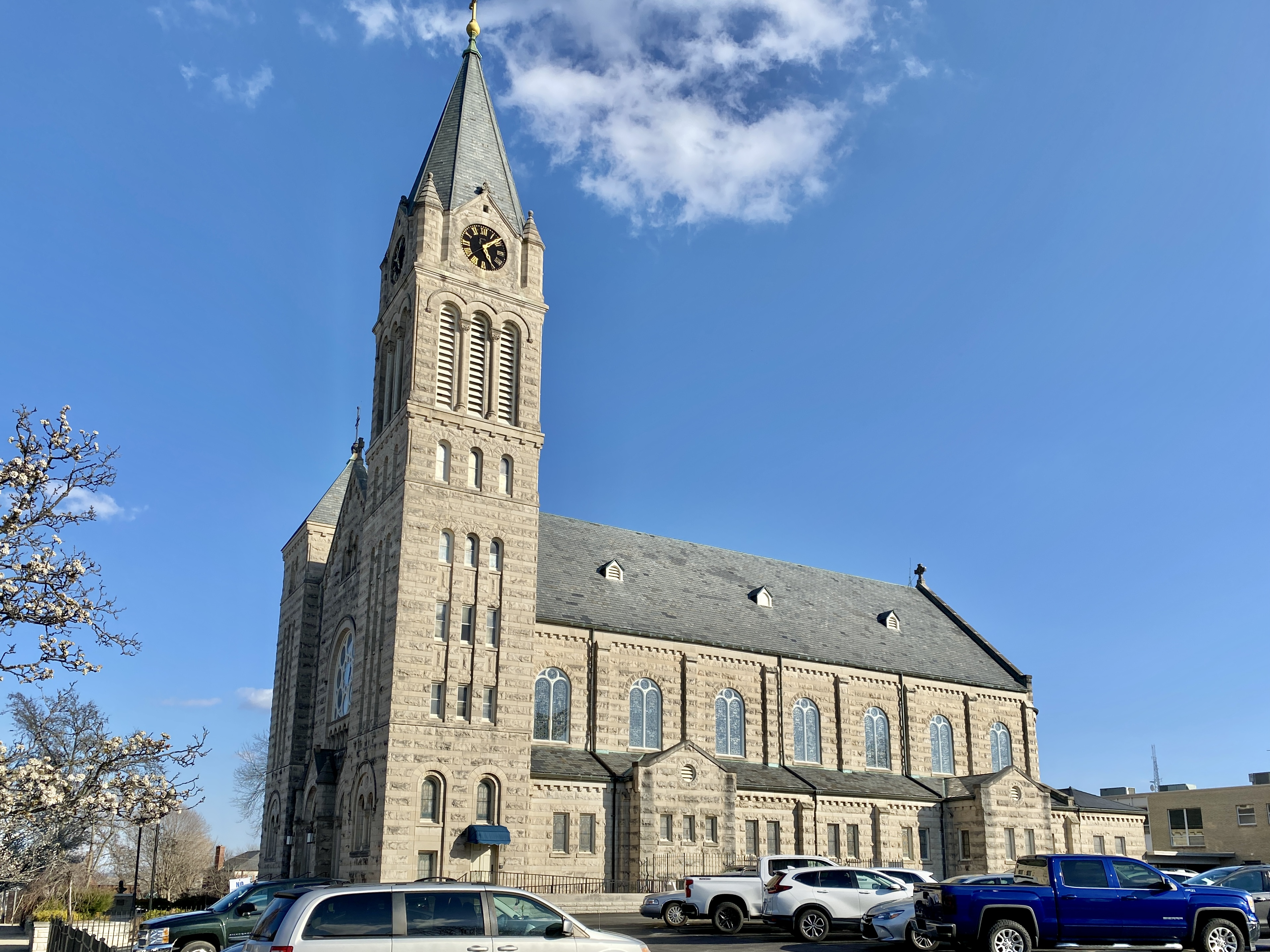
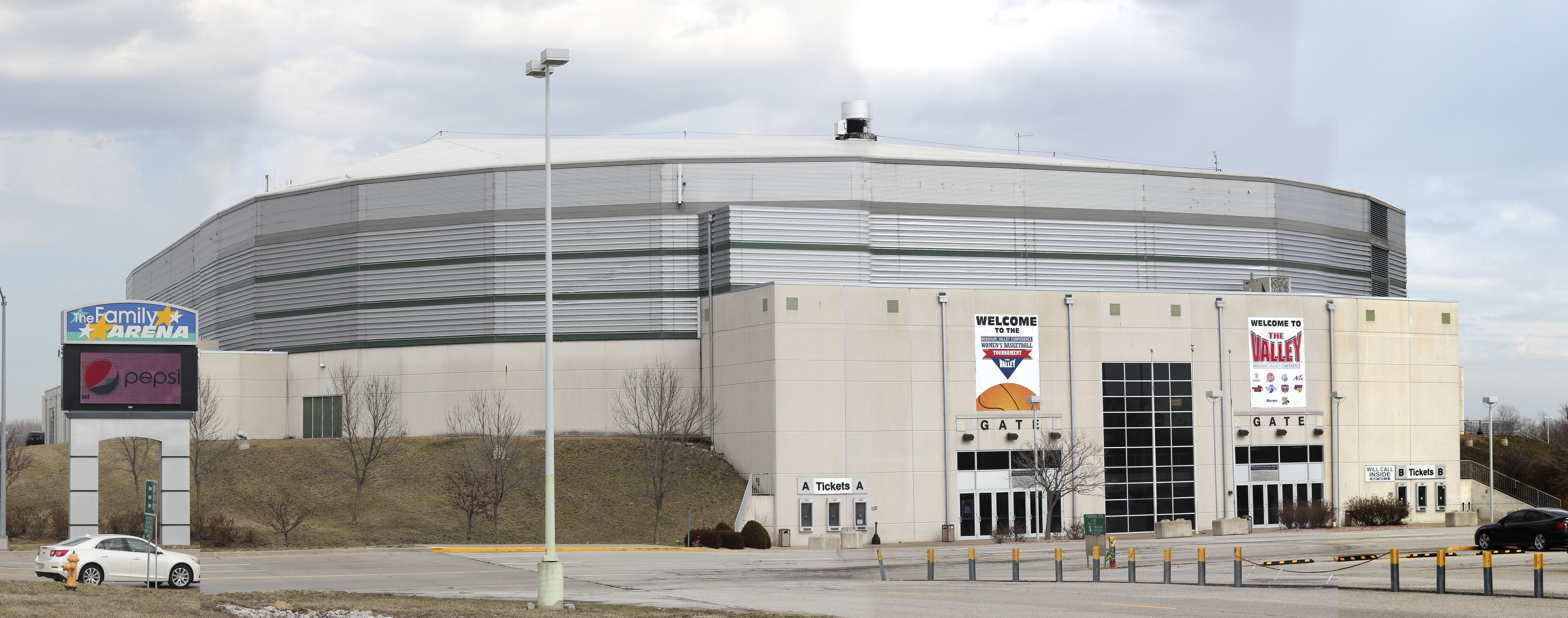
- Downtown St. Charles First Missouri State Capitol Newbill-McElhiney House St. Charles County Courthouse Lindenwood University St. Charles Borromeo Church Family Arena

- Flag

- Location in the state of Missouri
- Coordinates: 38.789°N 90.514°W
- Country: United States
- State: Missouri
- County: Saint Charles
- Incorporated: 1809
- Named for: Charles Borromeo

Government
  - Mayor: Dan Borgmeyer

Area
  - Total: 25.67 sq mi (66.48 km^{2})
  - Land: 25.17 sq mi (65.19 km^{2})
  - Water: 0.50 sq mi (1.29 km^{2})

Population (2020)
  - Total: 70,493
  - Estimate (2024): 72,458
  - Density: 2,801/sq mi (1,081.4/km^{2})
- Demonym: St. Charlesian
- Time zone: UTC−6 (CST)
  - Summer (DST): UTC−5 (CDT)
- ZIP Codes: 63301-63304
- Area codes: 636, 314
- FIPS code: 29-64082
- Website: stcharlescitymo.gov

Saint Charles (commonly abbreviated St. Charles) is a city in and the county seat of St. Charles County, Missouri, United States. The population was 70,493 at the 2020 census, making St. Charles the eighth-most populous city in Missouri. Situated on the Missouri River near its mouth at the Mississippi, St. Charles is approximately 20 miles northwest of St. Louis.

The city was founded circa 1769 as Les Petites Côtes, or "The Little Hills" in French, by Louis Blanchette, a French-Canadian fur trader. The St. Charles area was settled primarily by French-speaking colonists from Canada in its early days. This former French territory west of the Mississippi River was nominally ruled by Spain following France's defeat in the Seven Years' War, while France had also ceded the east of the Mississippi to Great Britain. St. Charles is thus the third-oldest city in what is now the state of Missouri. In the 18th and 19th century, the city's waterfront played a significant role as a river port for westward trade and expansion, including trade with Native American tribes on the upper Missouri River.

In 1804, the Lewis and Clark Expedition considered this settlement the last "civilized" stop before they headed upriver to explore the western territory that the United States acquired from France in the Louisiana Purchase.

The city served as the first Missouri capital from 1821 to 1826. It was also the starting point of the Boone's Lick Road to the Boonslick and the Santa Fe Trail. In the 20th century, it became the site of the Saint Rose Philippine Duchesne Catholic shrine.

== History ==
Native American peoples inhabited the area at least as early as 11,000 B.C. When European colonists arrived, the area was inhabited by the historic Ilini, Osage and Missouri tribes.

According to Hopewell's Legends of the Missouri and Mississippi, Blanchette met another French Canadian (Bernard Guillet) at this site in 1765. Blanchette, determined to settle there, asked if Guillet, who had become an honorary chief of a Dakota band, had chosen a name for it.

"I called the place 'Les Petites Côtes' " replied Bernard, "from the sides of the hills that you see."

"By that name shall it be called", said Blanchette Chasseur, "for it is the echo of nature—beautiful from its simplicity."

Blanchette settled there circa 1769 under the authority of the Spanish governor of Upper Louisiana (the area had been ceded by France to Spain under an agreement with Great Britain following French defeat in the French and Indian Wars). He was appointed as the territory's civil and military leader, serving until his death in 1793. Although the settlement was under Spanish jurisdiction, the settlers were primarily Native American and French Canadians who had migrated from northern territories and most of whom spoke French.

Considered to begin in St. Charles, the Boone's Lick Road along the Missouri River was the major overland route for European-American settlement of central and western Missouri. This area became known as the Boonslick or "Boonslick Country." At Franklin, the trail ended. Westward progress continued on the Santa Fe Trail.

=== San Carlos Borromeo ===
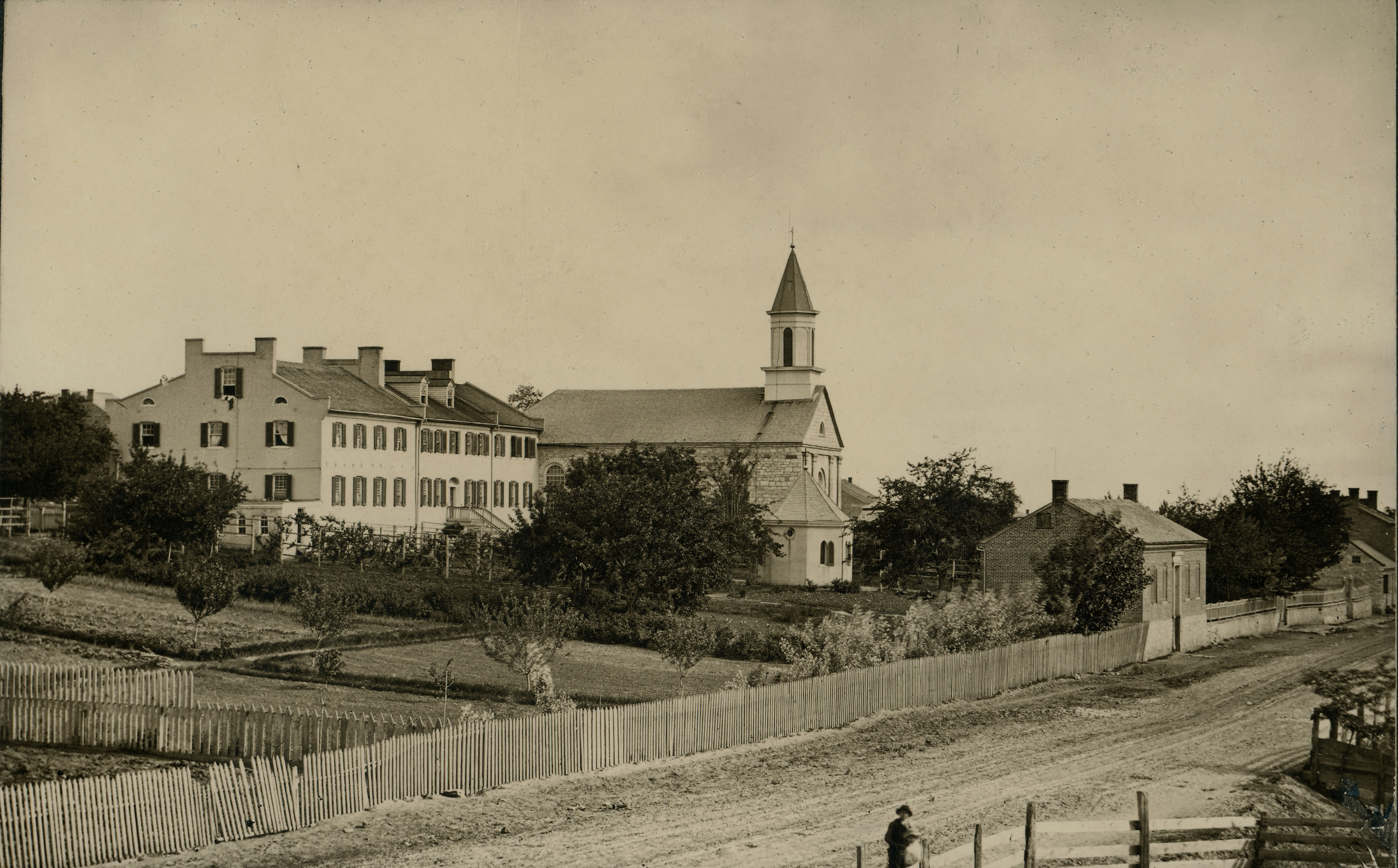
Sacred Heart Convent and Saint Charles Borromeo Catholic Church, 1908

The first church, built in 1791, was Catholic and dedicated to the Italian saint Charles Borromeo, under the Spanish version of his name, San Carlos Borromeo. The town became known as San Carlos del Misuri (St. Charles of the Missouri). The original location of the church is not known but a replica has been built just off Main Street. The fourth St. Charles Borromeo Church now stands on Fifth Street.

The Spanish Lieutenant-Governor Carlos de Hault de Lassus appointed Daniel Boone as commandant of the Femme Osage District. He served in this role until the United States government acquired control in 1804 following the Louisiana Purchase from France.

The name of the town, San Carlos, was anglicized to St. Charles. William Clark arrived in St. Charles on May 16, 1804. With him were 40 men and three boats; they made final preparations for their major cross-country expedition, as they waited for Meriwether Lewis to arrive from St. Louis. They attended dances, dinners, and a church service during this time. Excited to be part of the national expedition, the townspeople were very hospitable to the explorers. Lewis arrived via St. Charles Rock Road on May 20. The expedition launched the next day in a keel boat at 3:30 pm. St. Charles was the last established European-American town that the expedition visited for more than two and a half years.

=== State capital and growth ===
Steamboats Montana and Penguin in high water by the original St. Charles Bridge, c. 1880

When Missouri was granted statehood in 1821, the legislature decided to build a "City of Jefferson" to serve as the state capital, in the center of the state, overlooking the Missouri River. Since this land was undeveloped at the time, a temporary capital was needed. St. Charles was chosen over eight other cities in a competition to house the temporary capital. It offered free meeting space for the legislature in rooms located above a hardware store. This building is preserved as the First Missouri State Capitol State Historic Site and may be toured. The Missouri government continued to meet there until buildings were completed in Jefferson City in 1826.

Gottfried Duden was a German who visited in the area in 1824. Travelling under the guidance of Daniel M. Boone, he wrote extensive accounts of life in St. Charles County during his year there. He published these after returning to Germany in 1829, and his favorable impressions of the area led to the immigration of a number of Germans in 1833. The first permanent German settler in the region was probably Louis Eversman, who had arrived with Duden but decided to stay.

In the post-World War II era, the federal government undertook a major program of interstate highway construction. St. Charles is where the first claimed interstate project was started in 1956. A state highway marker is displayed with a logo and information regarding this claim, off Interstate 70 going westbound, to the right of the First Capitol Drive exit. Kansas and Pennsylvania also claim to have had the first interstate project.

== Geography ==
St. Charles is located about 20 miles northwest of St. Louis. According to the United States Census Bureau, the city has a total area of 24.03 square miles (62.24 km^{2}), of which 23.65 square miles (61.25 km^{2}) is land and 0.38 square miles (0.98 km^{2}) is water.

=== Climate ===
St. Charles has a Köppen humid subtropical climate, with warm and humid summers (eventual hot days) and cool winters (with short cold spells possible sometimes). Precipitation is mostly light to moderate, with occasional stormy weather. Spring is the wettest season on average.

Climate data for St. Charles, Missouri (1991–2020 normals, extremes 1893–present)
Month	Jan	Feb	Mar	Apr	May	Jun	Jul	Aug	Sep	Oct	Nov	Dec	Year
Record high °F (°C)	82 (28)	84 (29)	93 (34)	94 (34)	101 (38)	106 (41)	115 (46)	112 (44)	106 (41)	97 (36)	87 (31)	77 (25)	115 (46)
Mean maximum °F (°C)	64.4 (18.0)	69.9 (21.1)	78.1 (25.6)	84.6 (29.2)	89.1 (31.7)	93.0 (33.9)	96.1 (35.6)	96.3 (35.7)	91.6 (33.1)	86.4 (30.2)	74.9 (23.8)	66.7 (19.3)	97.9 (36.6)
Mean daily maximum °F (°C)	39.5 (4.2)	44.7 (7.1)	55.2 (12.9)	66.8 (19.3)	76.0 (24.4)	84.1 (28.9)	88.0 (31.1)	86.8 (30.4)	80.4 (26.9)	68.8 (20.4)	55.3 (12.9)	44.1 (6.7)	65.8 (18.8)
Daily mean °F (°C)	30.7 (−0.7)	35.0 (1.7)	44.4 (6.9)	55.4 (13.0)	65.5 (18.6)	74.2 (23.4)	78.2 (25.7)	76.3 (24.6)	68.8 (20.4)	57.3 (14.1)	45.3 (7.4)	35.2 (1.8)	55.5 (13.1)
Mean daily minimum °F (°C)	21.9 (−5.6)	25.2 (−3.8)	33.7 (0.9)	44.0 (6.7)	55.1 (12.8)	64.3 (17.9)	68.3 (20.2)	65.8 (18.8)	57.2 (14.0)	45.7 (7.6)	35.3 (1.8)	26.4 (−3.1)	45.2 (7.3)
Mean minimum °F (°C)	3.2 (−16.0)	8.4 (−13.1)	16.9 (−8.4)	30.0 (−1.1)	40.1 (4.5)	52.3 (11.3)	57.1 (13.9)	56.1 (13.4)	43.9 (6.6)	30.7 (−0.7)	20.1 (−6.6)	10.0 (−12.2)	0.2 (−17.7)
Record low °F (°C)	−25 (−32)	−24 (−31)	−7 (−22)	17 (−8)	30 (−1)	41 (5)	47 (8)	43 (6)	31 (−1)	19 (−7)	−4 (−20)	−19 (−28)	−25 (−32)
Average precipitation inches (mm)	2.74 (70)	2.86 (73)	3.63 (92)	5.11 (130)	5.45 (138)	4.35 (110)	4.20 (107)	4.07 (103)	3.08 (78)	3.50 (89)	3.73 (95)	2.99 (76)	45.71 (1,161)
Average snowfall inches (cm)	4.3 (11)	2.6 (6.6)	0.5 (1.3)	0.0 (0.0)	0.0 (0.0)	0.0 (0.0)	0.0 (0.0)	0.0 (0.0)	0.0 (0.0)	0.0 (0.0)	0.1 (0.25)	1.5 (3.8)	9.0 (23)
Average precipitation days (≥ 0.01 in)	7.5	6.9	9.7	10.3	11.4	9.1	8.4	7.3	7.0	8.2	8.1	7.1	101.0
Average snowy days (≥ 0.1 in)	2.1	1.8	0.3	0.0	0.0	0.0	0.0	0.0	0.0	0.0	0.4	1.0	5.6
Source: NOAA

== Demographics ==
Historical population
Census	Pop.	Note	%±
1850	1,498		—
1860	3,239		116.2%
1870	5,570		72.0%
1880	5,014		−10.0%
1890	6,161		22.9%
1900	7,982		29.6%
1910	9,437		18.2%
1920	8,503		−9.9%
1930	10,491		23.4%
1940	10,803		3.0%
1950	14,314		32.5%
1960	21,189		48.0%
1970	31,834		50.2%
1980	37,379		17.4%
1990	54,555		46.0%
2000	60,321		10.6%
2010	65,794		9.1%
2020	70,493		7.1%
U.S. Decennial Census

=== 2020 census ===
As of the 2020 census, St. Charles had a population of 70,493. The population density was 2,800.7 per square mile (1,081.3/km^{2}).

The median age was 38.8 years. 18.7% of residents were under the age of 18 and 17.8% of residents were 65 years of age or older. For every 100 females there were 95.0 males, and for every 100 females age 18 and over there were 93.0 males age 18 and over.

99.9% of residents lived in urban areas, while 0.1% lived in rural areas.

There were 29,863 households and 16,791 families in St. Charles, of which 24.4% had children under the age of 18 living in them. Of all households, 44.1% were married-couple households, 20.3% were households with a male householder and no spouse or partner present, and 28.0% were households with a female householder and no spouse or partner present. About 32.9% of all households were made up of individuals and 12.1% had someone living alone who was 65 years of age or older. The average household size was 2.2 and the average family size was 2.9.

There were 31,744 housing units, of which 5.9% were vacant. The homeowner vacancy rate was 0.9% and the rental vacancy rate was 7.9%.

Racial composition as of the 2020 census
Race	Number	Percent
White	55,850	79.2%
Black or African American	5,460	7.7%
American Indian and Alaska Native	175	0.2%
Asian	2,315	3.3%
Native Hawaiian and Other Pacific Islander	40	0.1%
Some other race	1,925	2.7%
Two or more races	4,728	6.7%
Hispanic or Latino (of any race)	3,969	5.6%

The 2016–2020 5-year American Community Survey estimates show that the median household income was $71,232 (with a margin of error of +/- $3,225) and the median family income was $90,211 (+/- $3,208). Males had a median income of $46,607 (+/- $2,598) versus $28,573 (+/- $5,404) for females. The median income for those above 16 years old was $37,734 (+/- $3,118). Approximately, 5.0% of families and 7.6% of the population were below the poverty line, including 9.6% of those under the age of 18 and 4.6% of those ages 65 or over.

=== 2010 census ===
As of the census of 2010, there were 65,794 people, 26,715 households, and 16,128 families residing in the city. The population density was 2,782.0 inhabitants per square mile (1,074.1/km^{2}). There were 28,590 housing units at an average density of 1,208.9 per square mile (466.8/km^{2}). The racial makeup of the city was 87.5% White, 5.9% African American, 0.3% Native American, 2.5% Asian, 0.1% Pacific Islander, 1.8% from other races, and 1.9% from two or more races. Hispanic or Latino of any race were 4.2% of the population.

There were 26,715 households, of which 27.5% had children under the age of 18 living with them, 45.4% were married couples living together, 10.8% had a female householder with no husband present, 4.2% had a male householder with no wife present, and 39.6% were non-families. 31.9% of all households were made up of individuals, and 10.1% had someone living alone who was 65 years of age or older. The average household size was 2.29 and the average family size was 2.90.

The median age in the city was 36.6 years. 19.7% of residents were under the age of 18; 13.8% were between the ages of 18 and 24; 25.9% were from 25 to 44; 26.6% were from 45 to 64; and 13.9% were 65 years of age or older. The gender makeup of the city was 49.0% male and 51.0% female.

According to 2014, American Community Survey 5-year Estimates the median income for a household in the city was $56,622, and the median income for a family was $73,234. Males had a median income of $51,477 versus $40,311 females. The per capita income for the city was $29,645. 8.8% of families and 11.5% of the population were below the poverty line, including 18.7% of those under age 18 and 6.0% of those age 65 or over.

=== 2000 census ===
As of the census of 2000, there were 60,321 people, 24,210 households, and 15,324 families residing in the city. The population density was 2,962.4 inhabitants per square mile (1,143.8/km^{2}). There were 25,283 housing units at an average density of 1,241.6 per square mile (479.4/km^{2}). The racial makeup of the city was 93.28% White, 3.48% African American, 0.27% Native American, 1.01% Asian, 0.04% Pacific Islander, 0.73% from other races, and 1.19% from two or more races. Hispanic or Latino of any race were 1.97% of the population.

There were 24,210 households, out of which 30.1% had children under the age of 18 living with them, 49.4% were married couples living together, 10.2% had a female householder with no husband present, and 36.7% were non-families. 29.6% of all households were made up of individuals, and 9.1% had someone living alone who was 65 years of age or older. The average household size was 2.38 and the average family size was 2.98.

In the city, the population was spread out, with 23.4% under the age of 18, 12.0% from 18 to 24, 30.5% from 25 to 44, 22.0% from 45 to 64, and 12.2% who were 65 years of age or older. The median age was 35 years. For every 100 females, there were 96.3 males. For every 100 females age 18 and over, there were 93.7 males.

The median income for a household in the city was $47,782, and the median income for a family was $60,175. Males had a median income of $40,827 versus $27,778 for females. The per capita income for the city was $23,607. About 4.6% of families and 6.3% of the population were below the poverty line, including 8.1% of those under age 18 and 5.9% of those age 65 or over.

== Economy ==
According to the city's 2015 Comprehensive Annual Financial Report, the top employers in the city are:

#	Employer	# of Employees
1	Ameristar Casinos	1,620
2	St. Charles County	1,500
3	SSM St. Joseph Health Center	1,352
4	Boeing	1,170
5	City of St. Charles School District	852
6	Client Services Inc.	698
7	Lindenwood University	618
8	AT&T Missouri	600
9	Central States Coca-Cola	500
10	City of St. Charles	494

Pharma Medica, a contract research and biotechnology corporation, opened its first U.S. location in 2013 in St. Charles. It began conducting clinical trials in February 2014. Its goal was to create 320 high tech jobs by early 2017.

== Culture ==
St. Charles lies near the eastern end of the Katy Trail, a 225-mile (362 km) long state park that was adapted from railroad right-of-way. Since the late 1970s, there has been rapid new home construction, commercial and population growth in the St. Charles area. The phrase "Golden Triangle" was coined by developers of this area in the 1980s, referring to the St. Charles County region bordered by highways Interstate 70, Interstate 64, and Route 94.

St. Charles has a historic shopping district on Main Street. Numerous restored buildings house such tourist destinations as restaurants and various specialty stores. Since 2015, walking food tours on Historic Main Street can be taken through the company Dishing Up America. These tours take customers to the locally famous restaurants in the city.

The city has many special events and features related to the Lewis and Clark Expedition. In 2007, St. Charles welcomed men's professional road bicycle racing riders and fans, as it served as the stage 5 final for the 2007 Tour of Missouri.

While it does not offer a public golf course, the St. Charles Parks and Recreation System opened a dog park on the north side of the city as a part of DuSable Park-Bales Area in November 2006. This off-leash dog area has two sections – one for smaller dogs, one for larger.

The St. Charles Convention Center brings visitors, meetings and events to the city. The Family Arena, a county-owned 11,000-seat venue, was built in 1999 near the Missouri River. It is used by minor league sports franchises and hosts concerts and events.

=== Riverfront ===
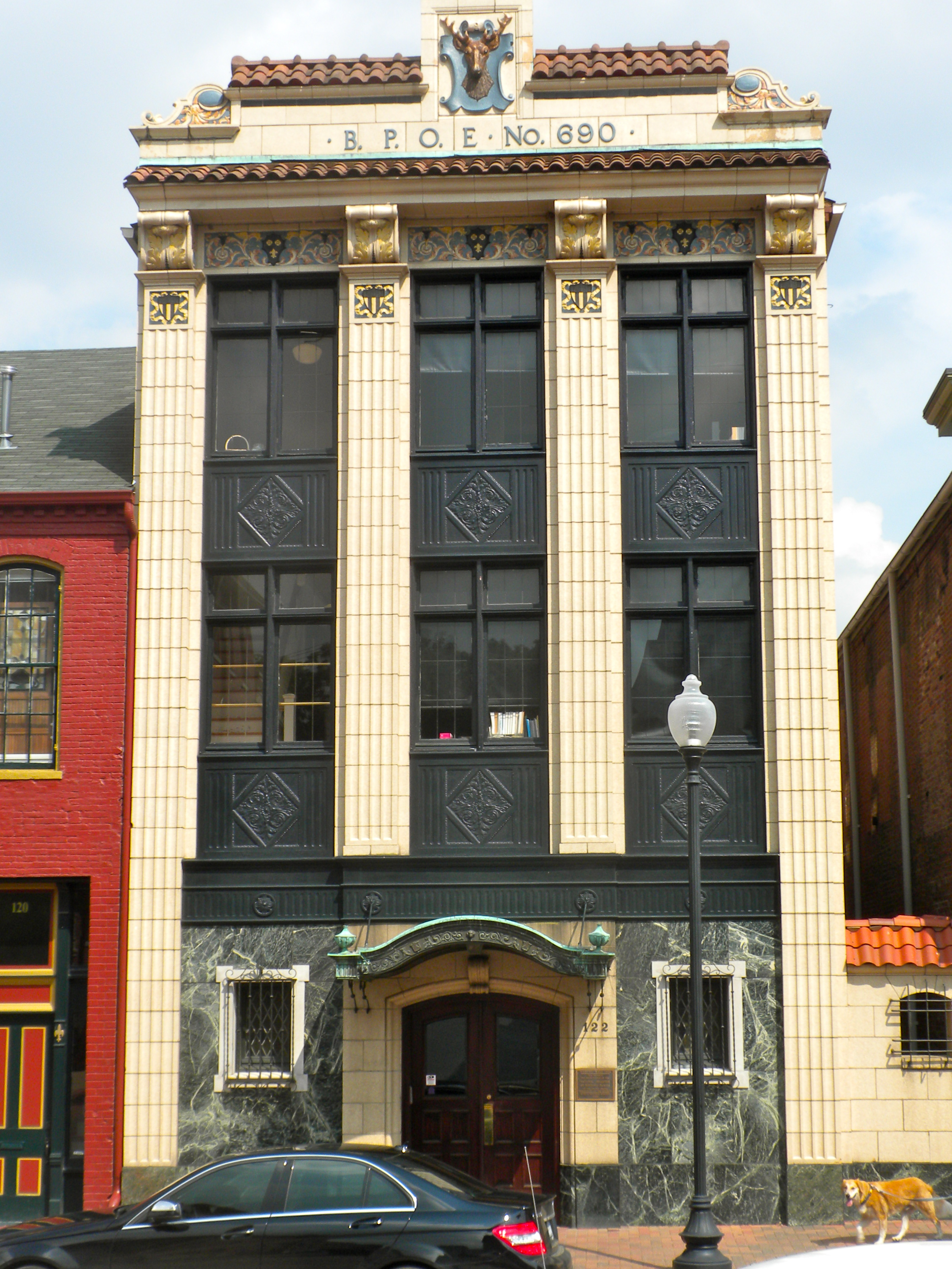
Elks Club, 122 S. Main Street

The Riverfront and Main Street area in the St. Charles Historic District is a central gathering place and focal point for the community. The primary features of the riverfront and Historic Main Street are residences and businesses. Each block includes shops, restaurants, and offices. Plans for the development and improvement of the area include a northward extension of the Katy Trail, residential and commercial development, parking garage and casino expansion, and development of hotels.

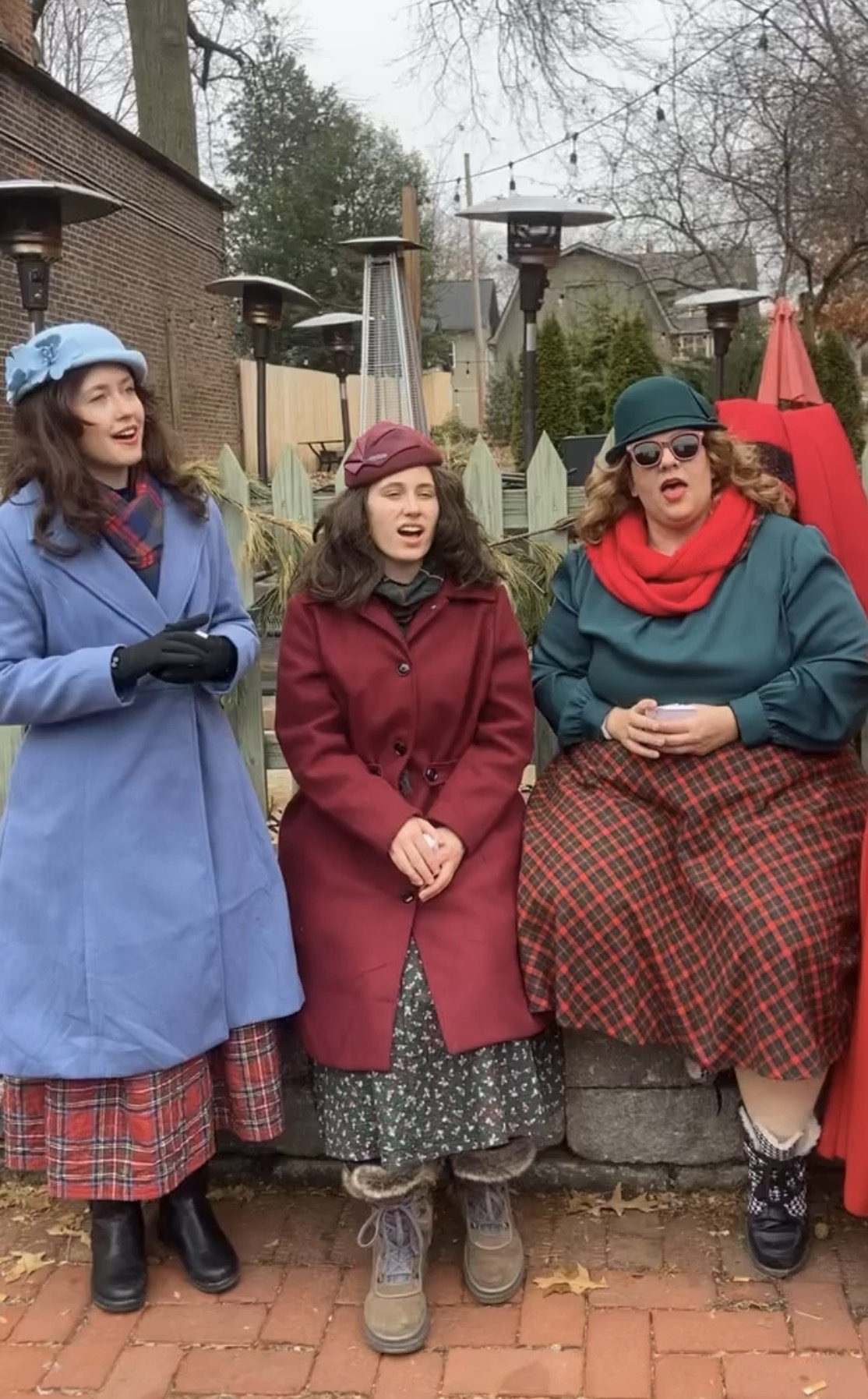
Carolers wearing retro costumes sing during the Christmas Traditions Festival

The Christmas Traditions Festival, one of the nation's largest such festivals, takes place annually on the city streets, from the day after Thanksgiving until the Saturday after Christmas. Over 30 costumed Legends of Christmas stroll the streets and interact with guests, and Victorian Era Christmas Carolers sing old-fashioned carols. Each Saturday and Sunday, the costumed Legends characters and the Lewis & Clark Fife and Drum Corps join the Santa Parade from Historic South Main Street to the site of the First Missouri State Capitol.

On the Fourth of July, fireworks displays draw large numbers on two nights, July 4 and the night before or after the Fourth. The festival, named Riverfest, has been sponsored by the city of St. Charles and organized by a volunteer committee of local leaders.

The Festival of the Little Hills is a historic St. Charles tradition that takes place every year in August, the third full weekend of the month. Started in 1971, it includes food, live entertainment, craft sales, and shows for kids. The festival is related to the Lewis & Clark expedition, with some participants wearing clothing from the era and re-enacting historic events. Individuals are encouraged to bring homemade items to sell at the festival.

Oktoberfest, held near the river, celebrates the historic German influence on the city, with vendors selling beer and other German goods. It includes a parade. Missouri Tartan Day is a celebration of Scottish American heritage and culture held each spring, coinciding as closely as possible with April 6. This is the anniversary of the signing of the Declaration of Arbroath in 1320. The event features a parade with marching bagpipers from around the world and region, Scottish heavy athletics (caber toss, hammer throw, etc.), musical entertainment, traditional and contemporary foods. Highlights include the Kirkin' o' the Tartans (ceremony of blessing for the Scottish clans), displays of traditional Scottish clan tartans, and demonstrations of traditional Scottish activities and games.

The Fete de Glace is an ice-carving competition and demonstration held on North Main Street in mid-January. The Missouri River Irish Festival is held every September in Frontier Park and on Main Street to celebrate Irish Heritage with music, dancing, storytelling, athletics, food, and other entertainment. During Quilts on Main Street, hundreds of quilts are displayed outside the shops on storefronts and balconies. This event is held annually in September. The Bluegrass Festival in Frontier Park on the big stage of Jaycee's pavilion is held early in September, featuring local and regional acts. The MOSAICS Fine Art Festival is also held on Historic Main Street each September to showcase local, regional and national artists. LGBTQ+ organization Pride St. Charles holds an annual pride festival in June at the St. Charles Family Arena.

== Sports ==
The city has been home to several minor league sports teams. The Missouri River Otters hockey team of the United Hockey League, played from 1999 until the team folded in 2006. The River Otters played at the 11,000-seat Family Arena. The St. Louis Ambush is a professional indoor soccer team that plays in the Family Arena. The RiverCity Rage professional indoor football team played in St. Charles from 2001 until 2005, and from 2007 to 2009 before suspending operations for 2010. Since 2014 there is a new minor league soccer team in town, the St. Louis Ambush at the Family Arena.

Team	Sport	League	Established	Venue	Championships
St. Louis Ambush	Indoor soccer	MISL/PASL/MASL	2013	Family Arena	
St. Louis Vipers	Roller hockey	National Roller Hockey League	2019	Family Arena	

== Government ==
St. Charles is a charter city under the Missouri Constitution, with a City Council as the governing body. One member is elected for each of the ten wards, in an arrangement known as single-member districts, and each serves a three-year term.

The executive head of the city government is the mayor for all legal and ceremonial purposes. Elected at-large for a four-year term, the mayor appoints the members of the various boards, commissions, and committees created by ordinance. The current mayor is Dan Borgmeyer; he was sworn into office on May 7, 2019.

Ward	City Council Member
1	Christopher Kyle
2	Tom Besselman
3	Vince Ratchford
4	Mary West
5	Denise Mitchell
6	Jerry Reese
7	Michael Flandermeyer
8	Michael Galba
9	Bart Haberstroh
10	Bridget Ohmes

2019 St. Charles mayoral election (non-partisan)
Candidate	Votes	%
Dan Borgmeyer	4,455	55.33%
Sally Faith	3,570	44.34%
Write-in	27	0.34%

== Education ==
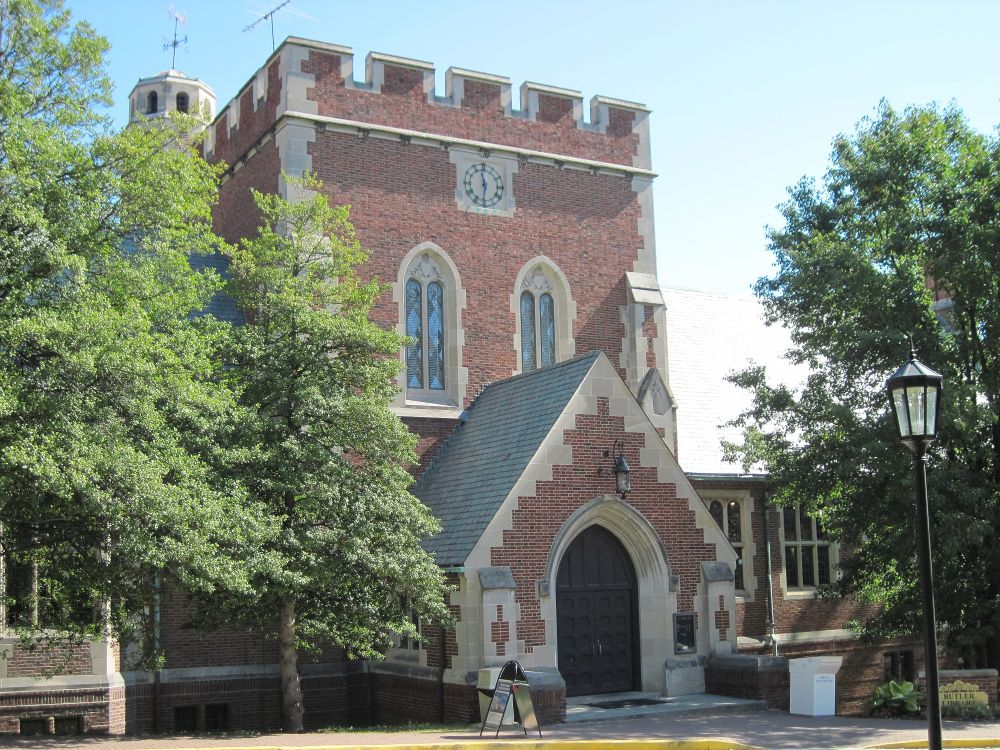
Butler Library at Lindenwood University

The majority of St. Charles is in the City of St. Charles School District. That district has six elementary schools, two middle schools, two high schools, and the Lewis & Clark Career Center located at 2400 Zumbehl Road. St. Charles High School (sometimes called SCHS or simply "High") was the first built (1895) of the two high schools. It first operated as a private military academy for boys. In the 1950s, it was acquired by the city and adapted as a public high school. St. Charles West (SCW or simply West) was constructed in the late 1970s in response to the city's growing population. St. Charles West had its first graduation in 1979. St. Charles High School underwent renovation in 1995 to improve both the exterior and interior of the building. St. Charles West was renovated in 2005, and a new library and auxiliary gym were built. The city is also served by Jefferson Intermediate, which has all 5th and 6th grade classes, and Hardin Middle School, which has all 7th and 8th grade classes.

Some parts of St. Charles are in other school districts: southern portions are in the Francis Howell School District, while northern parts are in the Orchard Farm School District. Many students who live on the southern edge of St. Charles City attend Henderson, Becky David, or Harvest Ridge elementary schools, Barnwell Middle, and Francis Howell North High School. To the North, the Orchard Farm School District also serves St. Charles. Like the Francis Howell School District, its administrative offices are not in St. Charles, and it has two elementary schools, a middle school, and a high school.

A variety of private schools also operate here, each affiliated with a religious denomination. These include Immanuel Lutheran (Pre-K to 8), Zion Lutheran (Pre-K to 8), St. Charles Borromeo, St. Peter's, St. Cletus (K–8), Academy of the Sacred Heart (founded by Saint Rose Philippine Duchesne, and the site of her shrine), Duchesne High School (formerly named St. Peter High school), and St. Elizabeth Ann Seton-St. Robert Bellarmine (K–8).

Lindenwood University is located on Kingshighway, near downtown St. Charles and St. Charles High. Founded by Major George Sibley and his wife Mary in 1827 as a women's school named Lindenwood School for Girls, the institution is the second-oldest higher-education institution west of the Mississippi River. The private university is affiliated with the Presbyterian Church.

In the 21st century, LU is one of the fastest-growing universities in the Midwest. It enrolls close to 15,000 students. In 2006, it briefly attracted publicity when People for the Ethical Treatment of Animals staged a small protest against its unusual tuition fee policies: In an effort to help rural students pay for higher education, LU allowed families to sell livestock to the school. The animals were slaughtered and processed for serving at campus dining halls. Lindenwood hosts 89.1 The Wood (KCLC), a commercial-free student-driven radio station.

St. Charles was also home to the now defunct St. Charles College (not to be confused with St. Charles Community College), Vatterott College, and St. Mary's College.

== Transportation ==
Proposed St. Charles City Streetcar

Overview
- Locale: St. Charles, Missouri
- Stations: 5 (proposed)

Service
- Type: Streetcar
- Operator: St. Charles Area Transit

Technical
- Line length: 10-mile (16 km)
- Track gauge: 1,435 mm (4 ft 8 1/2 in)

According to the Federal Highway Administration, St. Charles was the site of the first interstate highway project in the nation. Major highways include Interstate 70, Missouri 370, Missouri 94, and Missouri 364. Also see: St. Charles Area Transit

The "St. Charles City Streetcar" was a proposed new heritage streetcar line to be built connecting the New Town, Missouri residential development to the heart of the city of St. Charles. It was a joint effort between Whittaker Builders, Inc, and the City of St. Charles and St. Charles Area Transit. A minimum of nine vintage PCC streetcars (not to be confused with cable cars), had been purchased from the San Francisco area by Whittaker Builders for use and spare parts. The project stalled, and in 2012, the streetcars purchased by Whittaker Builders were scrapped following a fire. Whittaker, a developer of the New Town project and principal partner with the city on the streetcar project, has since gone bankrupt, ending the proposed street car line.

== Sister cities ==
- – Ludwigsburg, Baden-Württemberg, Germany since 1996
- – Carndonagh, County Donegal, Ireland since 2012
- – Inishowen, Ireland since 2018
- – Montbéliard, France since 2026

== In popular culture ==
Star-Lord from Guardians of the Galaxy is from St. Charles.

The scenes that were set in St. Charles in Guardians of the Galaxy Vol. 2 were filmed in Cartersville, Georgia.

== Notable people ==
- Cody Asche (born 1990) – MLB player
- Doug Baird (1891–1967) — MLB player
- Brandon Bollig (born 1987) – NHL player
- Daniel Boone (1734–1820) – pioneer and frontiersman; lived in St. Charles around 1809 to be near his grandson in boarding school.
- Lou Brock (1939–2020) – MLB player and National Baseball Hall of Fame inductee
- Mark Buehrle (born 1979) – MLB player
- Rose Philippine Duchesne (1769–1852) – Catholic saint who established America's first Society of the Sacred Heart congregations
- R. Budd Dwyer (1939–1987) – Pennsylvania State Treasurer who committed suicide during a press conference
- Josh Harrellson (born 1989) – NBA player; played internationally in numerous leagues
- Tim Hawkins (born 1968) – comedian and singer-songwriter
- Mike Henneman (born 1961) – MLB player
- Randy Orton (born 1980) – WWE wrestler
- Jim Pendleton (1924–1996) – MLB player
- Mathew Pitsch (born 1963 or 1964) – state senator from Arkansas
- Jean Baptiste Point du Sable (before 1750–1818) – frontier trader who was the first non-native settler of Chicago
- Tim Ream (born 1987) – professional soccer player and United States international
- Ken Reitz (1951–2021) – MLB player
- Santino Rice (born 1974) – fashion designer and TV personality
- Austin Ruse (born 1956) – political activist, author
- Patrick Schulte (born 2001) – soccer player who represented the United States national team and 2024 Olympian
- Jeanne Shaheen (born 1947) – U.S. senator for New Hampshire and governor of New Hampshire
- Nathaniel Simonds (1775–1850) – State Treasurer of Missouri
- Jacob Turner (born 1991) – MLB and KBO League player

== See also ==
- List of cities in Missouri
