= Brendan Webber =

American politician

Member-elect of the Missouri House of Representatives from the 43rd district
- Assuming office January 2027
- Succeeding: Kent Haden

Personal details
- Party: Republican

Brendan Webber is an American politician. A member of the Republican Party, he is the member-elect for the 43rd district of the Missouri House of Representatives.
