= 2021 St. Louis mayoral election =

2021 Saint Louis mayoral election
- April 6, 2021
- Turnout: 29.15%
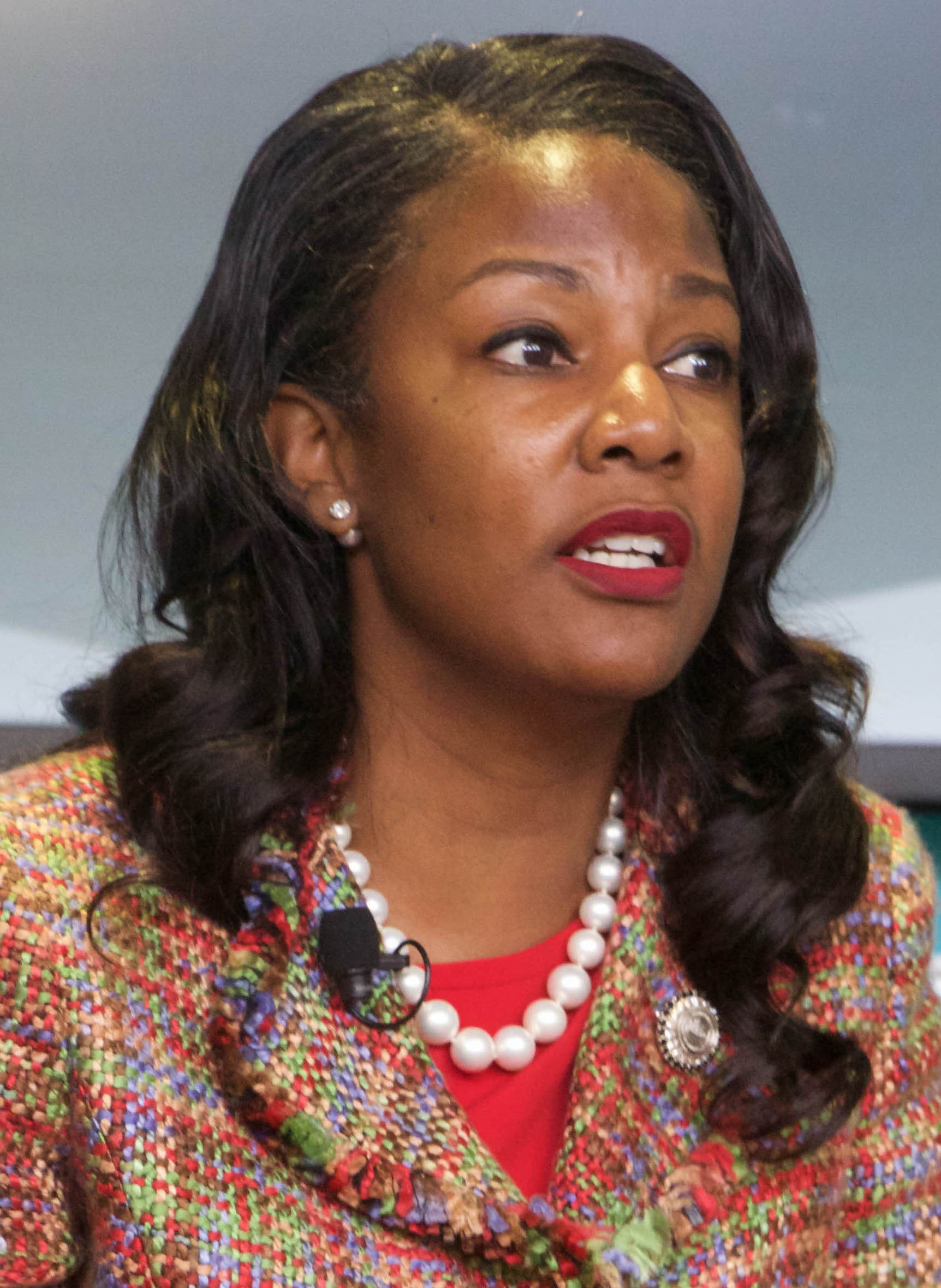

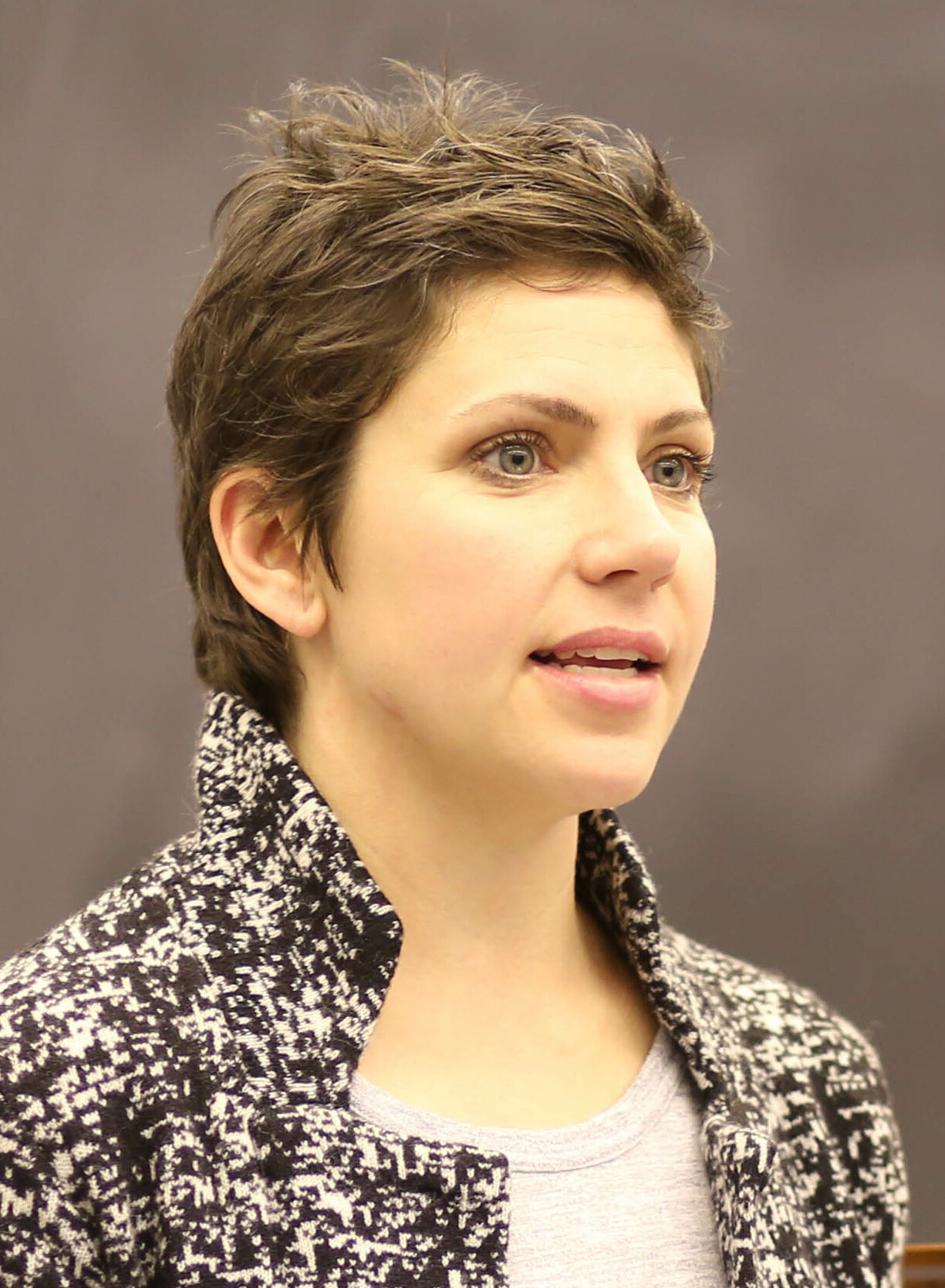
Candidate	Tishaura Jones	Cara Spencer
Popular vote	30,166	27,865
Percentage	51.70%	47.75%
- Jones: 50–60% 60–70% 70–80% 80–90% >90% Spencer: 40–50% 50–60% 60–70% 70–80% 80–90% >90% Tie: 50% No votes
Mayor before election
Lyda Krewson
Democratic
Elected mayor
Tishaura Jones
Nonpartisan

The 2021 St. Louis mayoral election occurred in two stages, with a unified primary on March 2, 2021, and a two-candidate general election on April 6, 2021. The election was the first in the nation to use approval voting for a primary. Incumbent Democratic mayor Lyda Krewson was eligible to seek re-election to a second term in office, but chose to retire.

In a primary field of four candidates, St. Louis Treasurer Tishaura Jones and Alderwoman Cara Spencer advanced to the general election. Jones defeated Spencer in the general election by nearly 4% of votes cast, becoming the first African-American woman elected to the office of mayor.

== Background ==
In 2017, then-St. Louis alderwoman Lyda Krewson was elected mayor, becoming the first woman to do so. However, in late 2020, she announced that she would not seek re-election to a second term, despite being eligible to run. Krewson cited her age as the primary reason for her retirement, saying: "I am now pushing 70. So after a lot of thinking and a lot of discussion with my family, I decided to retire in April and not run for re-election." Krewson had faced criticism during her term for her perceived mishandling of Black Lives Matter protests in the summer of 2020, with numerous demonstrations outside the mayor's home and calls for her to resign. Krewson was also facing a primary challenge from Jones and Spencer, both of whom launched their campaigns for mayor before Krewson announced her retirement. However, Krewson denied that these factors had any influence on her decision not to seek re-election.

Some also speculated that Proposition D, a ballot measure passed by St. Louis voters with 68% of the vote in November 2020, would have made it more difficult for Krewson to survive a primary challenge. Proposition D altered St. Louis elections so that they would use a new electoral process. The old system used partisan primaries with first-past-the-post voting. Since 2021, all candidates for municipal elections in St. Louis instead compete in a single nonpartisan primary using approval voting, and the two candidates with the highest vote total advanced to the general election. Krewson opposed Proposition D, while Jones supported it.

== Candidates ==
=== Candidates who advanced to the general election ===
Candidate	Experience	Party preference	Ref
Tishaura Jones	Treasurer of St. Louis (2013–2021); Former Assistant Minority Floor Leader of the Missouri House of Representatives (2011–2013); Former state representative (2009–2013); Candidate for mayor in 2017	Party preference: Democratic (Website)	
Cara Spencer	St. Louis alderwoman for the 20th ward (2015–present)	Party preference: Democratic (Website)	

=== Candidates eliminated in the primary ===
Candidate	Experience	Party preference	Ref
Andrew Jones	Utility manager Nominee for mayor in 2017	Party preference: Republican (Website)	
Lewis E. Reed	President of the St. Louis Board of Aldermen (2007–2022); Candidate for mayor in 2013 and 2017	Party preference: Democratic (Website)	

==== Disqualified ====
- Keith Jefferson, small business owner
- Lassaad Jeliti, restaurateur
- Dana Kelly, restaurateur (party preference: Democratic)

==== Declined ====
- Gregory F. X. Daly, St. Louis Collector of Revenue (party preference: Democratic)
- Lyda Krewson, incumbent mayor (2017–present) (party preference: Democratic)

== Primary election ==
In a primary field of four candidates, St. Louis Treasurer Tishaura Jones and Alderwoman Cara Spencer advanced to the general election. The two women defeated President of the St. Louis Board of Aldermen Lewis E. Reed as well as utility manager Andrew Jones.

=== Endorsements ===
Andrew Jones

Organizations

- St. Louis Police Officers Association
Tishaura Jones

Federal officials

- Ayanna Pressley, U.S. representative for Massachusetts's 7th congressional district (2019–present), member of the Boston City Council (2010–2019)
- Elizabeth Warren, U.S. senator from Massachusetts (2013–present)

State officials

- Rasheen Aldridge Jr., Missouri state representative (2019–2023)
- LaKeySha Frazier-Bosley, Missouri state Representative (2019–present)
- Karla May, Missouri state senator (2019–present), Missouri state representative (2011–2019)

Mayors

- Stephen K. Benjamin, mayor of Columbia, South Carolina (2010–2022)
- Melvin Carter, mayor of Saint Paul (2018–present)
- Michael Hancock, mayor of Denver (2011–2023), member of the Denver City Council (2003–2011)
- Lee Harris, mayor of Shelby County, Tennessee (2018–present), Tennessee state senator (2015–2018), member of the Memphis City Council (2011–2015)
- Quinton Lucas, mayor of Kansas City (2019–present)
- Steven Reed, mayor of Montgomery (2019–present)
- Frank Scott Jr., mayor of Little Rock (2019–present)
- Michael Tubbs, mayor of Stockton (2017–2021)
- Randall Woodfin, mayor of Birmingham (2017–present)

Local officials

- Wesley Bell, St. Louis County prosecuting attorney (2019–present)
- Sam Page, St. Louis county executive (2019–present), member of the St. Louis County Council (2014–2019), Missouri state representative (2003–2009)

Individuals

- Roland Martin, journalist
- Blake Strode, civil rights lawyer and former professional tennis player

Organizations

- Coalition of Black Trade Unionists
- Communication Workers of America
- Democracy for America
- EMILY's List
- NARAL Pro-Choice America
- Organization for Black Struggle
- People for the American Way
- The People for Bernie Sanders
- Planned Parenthood (Note: Planned Parenthood Advocates of the St. Louis Region and Southwest Missouri chose to endorse two candidates, as the 2021 mayoral election is St. Louis's first to use approval voting.)
- Service Employees International Union
- The St. Louis American
- Working Families Party
- Young Democrats of St. Louis
Lewis E. Reed

Federal officials

- Lacy Clay, U.S. congressman for Missouri 1st District

Local officials

- John Collins-Muhammad, Saint Louis alderman, Ward 21
- Shameem Clark Hubbard, Saint Louis alderwoman, Ward 26
- Tom Oldernburg, Saint Louis alderman, Ward 16

Organizations

- The St. Louis Post-Dispatch editorial board (Note: The St. Louis Post-Dispatch editorial board chose to endorse two candidates, as the 2021 mayoral election is St. Louis's first to use approval voting.)
- United Food and Commercial Workers
Cara Spencer

Mayors

- Vincent C. Schoemehl, mayor of St. Louis (1981–1993)

Organizations

- Planned Parenthood
- The St. Louis Post-Dispatch editorial board

=== Polling ===
Poll source	Date(s) administered	Sample size	Margin of error	Andrew Jones	Tishaura Jones	Lewis Reed	Cara Spencer	Undecided
Remington Research (R)/Missouri Scout (Note: Non-partisan poll conducted for the local non-partisan tipsheet Missouri Scout) (Note: Participants were asked if a candidate would receive one of their votes in the primary election. Due to the nature of this poll, the percentages do not total to 100%.)	February 3–4, 2021	501 (LV)	± 4.4%	19%	51%	59%	40%	—
Show Me Victories (D)	January 5–8, 2021	732 (LV)	± 4.0%	5%	28%	30%	11%	27%

=== Results ===
Primary results by ward T. Jones: 30-40% 40-50% 50-60% Spencer: 30-40% 40-50%

Tishaura Jones and Cara Spencer advanced to the general election. Because the primary election was conducted using approval voting (and voters had the opportunity to mark their approval of more than one candidate), the numbers in the "Approval percentage" row add up to more than 100 percent.

March 2, 2021 Primary election results
	Tishaura Jones	Cara Spencer	Lewis E. Reed	Andrew Jones
Party preference:	Democratic Party	Democratic Party	Democratic Party	Republican Party
Votes of approval:	25,388	20,659	17,186	6,428
Approval percentage:	56.96%	46.35%	38.56%	14.42%
Total vote cards cast: 44,571

== General election ==
At the general election on the evening of Tuesday, April 6, 2021, Tishaura Jones defeated Cara Spencer to earn her first term as mayor of St. Louis, winning by over two thousand votes. This constituted nearly 4% of the people that voted that evening.

=== Polling ===
Leading up to the early April election, over 20% of voters told pollsters that they were undecided.

Poll source	Date(s) administered	Sample size	Margin of error	Tishaura Jones	Cara Spencer	Undecided
Show Me Victories (D)	March 25–28, 2021	650 (LV)	± 4.0%	42%	37%	21%
Show Me Victories (D)	March 4–6, 2021	550 (LV)	± 4.2%	40%	35%	25%
Remington Research (R)/Missouri Scout	March 3–4, 2021	544 (LV)	± 4.4%	43%	37%	20%

=== Results ===
Tishaura Jones defeated Cara Spencer by a 4% margin. Jones' margin of victory largely came from Northern St. Louis, while Spencer was stronger in the south. Jones received her largest margins in wards where Lewis Reed had come second in the primary.

2021 St. Louis mayoral general election results
Party	Candidate	Votes	%
Nonpartisan	Tishaura Jones	30,166	51.70
Nonpartisan	Cara Spencer	27,865	47.75
Write-in		319	0.55
Total votes		58,237	100.00

==== Results by ward ====
Ward	Tishuara Jones		Cara Spencer		Write-in		Total Votes
Ward	Votes	%	Votes	%	Votes	%	Total Votes
Ward 1	1262	84.13	229	15.27	9	0.6	1500
Ward 2	1043	79.14	269	20.41	6	0.46	1318
Ward 3	940	80.48	223	19.09	5	0.43	1168
Ward 4	1124	87.13	158	12.25	8	0.62	1290
Ward 5	990	72.21	376	27.43	5	0.36	1371
Ward 6	1673	60.18	1097	39.46	10	0.36	2780
Ward 7	1165	44.08	1459	55.20	19	0.72	2643
Ward 8	1981	57.34	1462	42.32	12	0.35	3455
Ward 9	1134	50.92	1079	48.45	14	0.63	2227
Ward 10	883	35.95	1559	63.48	14	0.57	2456
Ward 11	603	38.48	957	61.07	7	0.45	1567
Ward 12	576	20.41	2213	78.42	33	1.17	2822
Ward 13	791	32.67	1610	66.50	20	0.83	2421
Ward 14	679	38.65	1071	60.96	7	0.40	1757
Ward 15	1692	58.57	1188	41.12	9	0.31	2889
Ward 16	693	18.17	3081	80.76	41	1.07	3815
Ward 17	1217	51.74	1130	48.04	5	0.21	2352
Ward 18	1165	77.36	337	22.38	4	0.27	1506
Ward 19	1006	73.43	359	26.20	5	0.36	1370
Ward 20	651	54.07	543	45.10	10	0.83	1204
Ward 21	1451	85.20	249	14.62	3	0.18	1703
Ward 22	869	84.37	161	15.63	0	0.00	1030
Ward 23	983	28.53	2435	70.66	28	0.81	3446
Ward 24	871	34.41	1644	64.95	16	0.63	2531
Ward 25	716	58.74	495	40.61	8	0.66	1219
Ward 26	1585	78.78	419	20.83	8	0.40	2012
Ward 27	1263	84.26	231	15.41	5	0.33	1499
Ward 28	1160	38.68	1831	61.05	8	0.27	2999

== Notes ==
Partisan clients
