= Tishaura Jones =

American politician (born 1972)

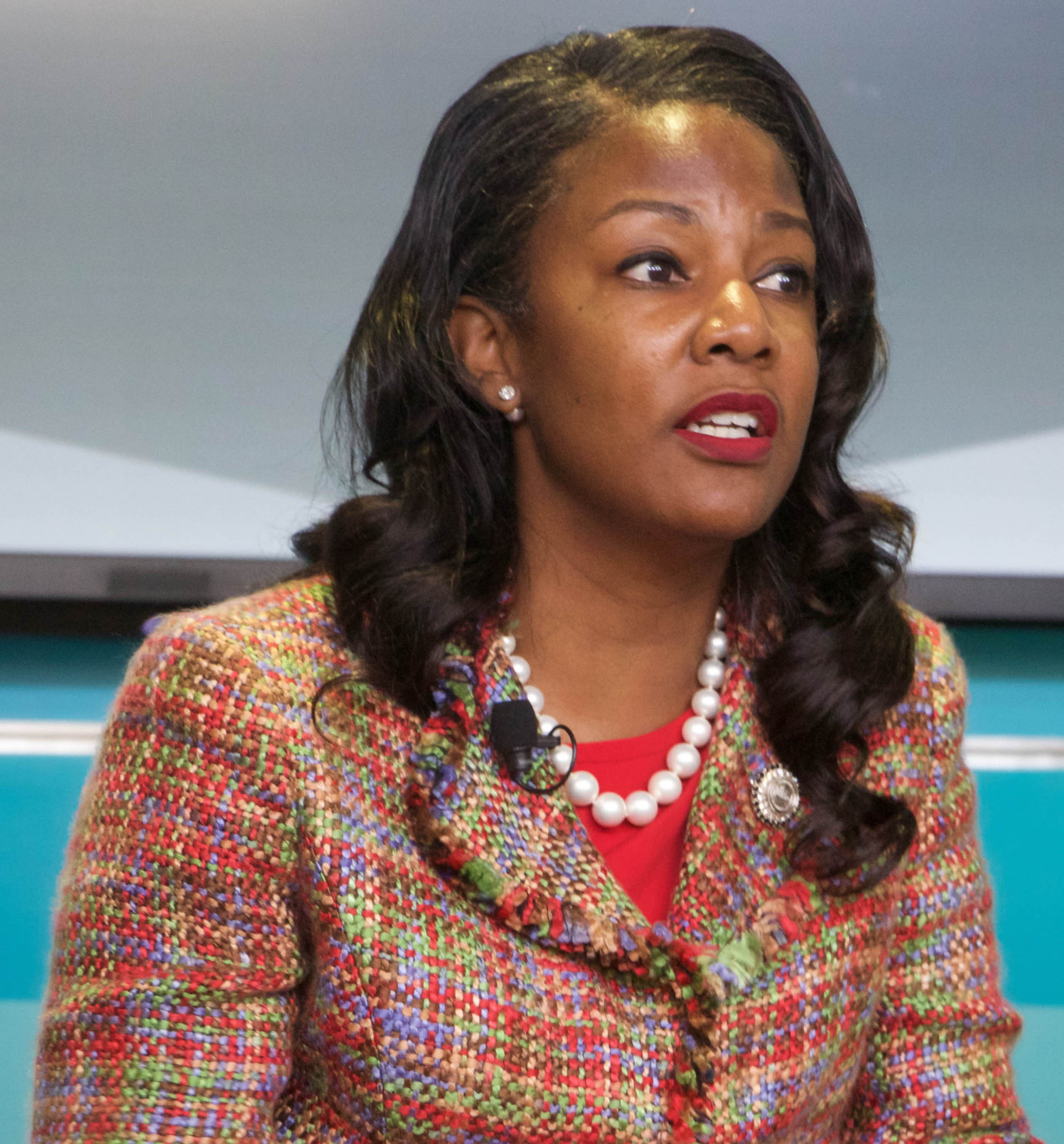
- Jones in 2017

47th Mayor of St. Louis
- In office April 20, 2021 – April 15, 2025
- Preceded by: Lyda Krewson
- Succeeded by: Cara Spencer

Treasurer of St. Louis
- In office January 1, 2013 – April 20, 2021
- Preceded by: Larry Williams
- Succeeded by: Adam Layne

Member of the Missouri House of Representatives from the 63rd district
- In office January 2009 – January 2013
- Preceded by: Robin Wright-Jones
- Succeeded by: Michael Butler

Personal details
- Born: Tishaura Oneda Jones; March 10, 1972 (age 54) St. Louis, Missouri, U.S.
- Party: Democratic
- Children: 1
- Education: Hampton University (BS); Saint Louis University (MHA)
- Website: Campaign website

Tishaura Oneda Jones (/tɪˈʃɑːrə/ tish-AR-ə; born March 10, 1972) is an American politician who served as the 47th mayor of St. Louis from 2021 to 2025. A member of the Missouri Democratic Party, Jones previously served from 2008 to 2013 in the Missouri House of Representatives, and as Treasurer of the City of St. Louis from 2013 to 2021.

Born in St. Louis to a former city comptroller, Jones studied at Hampton University in Virginia, returning to St. Louis upon graduating in 1994. Following a failed attempt to start a restaurant that left her bankrupt, she entered nursing, graduating from the Saint Louis University College for Public Health with a Master of Health Administration in 2001 and working for Cardinal Glennon Children's Hospital for two years.

A self-described progressive, Jones entered politics in 2002, when she was appointed to the Democratic Party Central Committee for St. Louis's eighth ward. In 2008, she was elected to represent Missouri's 63rd District in the state legislature, defeating independent candidate Nels Williams with 85.4 percent of the vote. She ran unopposed for re-election to the House in 2010.

In 2012, Jones ran for St. Louis Treasurer and won the general election with 77.9 percent of the vote. She was re-elected to the office in 2016 and 2020.

Jones was elected as Mayor of St. Louis in the 2021 mayoral election, narrowly defeating St. Louis Alderwoman Cara Spencer with 51.7 percent of the vote, becoming the first African-American female mayor in the city's history. In the 2025 mayoral election, a rematch of the 2021 election, Jones lost to Spencer in a landslide, garnering 35.83% of the vote.

== Early life and education ==
Tishaura Oneda Jones was born on March 10, 1972, in St. Louis to Virvus and Laura Jones. Her father was a former comptroller for the city. She is the couple's only child. Jones graduated from Affton High School in 1990 and enrolled in Hampton University, an historically black college in Hampton, Virginia. At Hampton, she was a member of the Delta Sigma Theta sorority. She graduated from the school with a Bachelor of Science in finance in 1994. In 2001, Jones earned a Master of Health Administration degree from the Saint Louis University College for Public Health. In 2015, she completed the State and Local Government program at the Harvard Kennedy School.

== Early career ==
In 1995, after graduating from Hampton University, Jones applied for a liquor license for a restaurant she was starting in the Central West End called Sugar's Place. The restaurant was unsuccessful, folding after about a year, and caused her major financial problems for years to come. In 1999, she filed for bankruptcy and faced a tax lien by the state of Missouri. Jones told The St. Louis Business Journal that her financial problems came during a "tumultuous time" in her life, as she had taken on debt from the restaurant, her father had been convicted on two counts of fraud in 1995, and her mother was dying of cancer, and said declaring bankruptcy "was the only way" to avoid financial ruin. Her lien was released in 2003, and Jones said her credit score in 2017 was in the high 700s. She said her experience with bankruptcy inspired her to create an office as treasurer that gives financial literacy instruction to St. Louis residents.

From May 2001 to June 2003, Jones was an executive trainee at Cardinal Glennon Children's Hospital. When she ran for mayor in 2017, Steven M. Barney, who had mentored her at Cardinal Glennon, wrote that Jones did an "outstanding" job at the hospital and had "appropriate assertiveness."

Jones began her political career in 2002, when she was appointed to the Democratic Party Central Committee for St. Louis's eighth ward. Since 2004, Jones has served as the committee's serjeant-at-arms.

== Missouri House of Representatives (2009–2013) ==
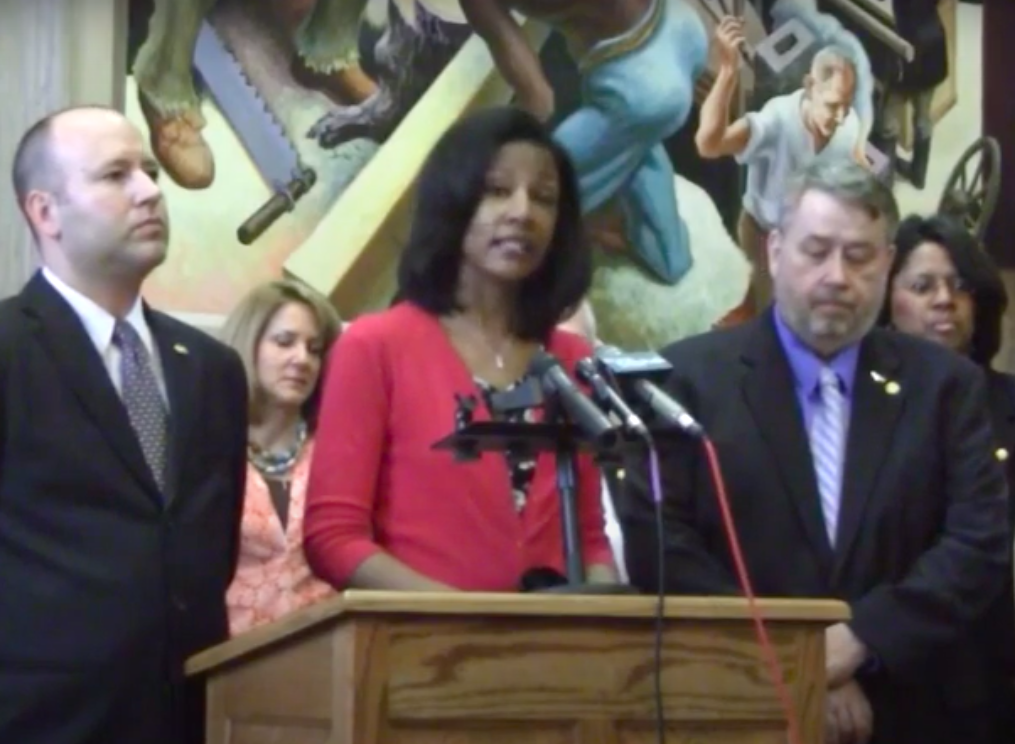
Jones speaking at the Missouri State Capitol in 2012

On November 4, 2008, Jones was elected to the Missouri House of Representatives over independent candidate Nels Williams to represent the state's 63rd district. There was no Republican challenger for the seat, and Jones received 85.4 percent of the vote. Her father, Virvus, managed her campaign.

Jones ran unopposed in 2010 to win her second term, and became both the first African-American and the first woman appointed to serve as the Missouri House's assistant minority floor leader. In the House, she served on several committees, including the Elementary and Secondary Education Committee, the Health Insurance Committee, and the Special Standing Committee on Election Contests.

From March 2010 to June 2011, Jones also worked as the Vice President of Municipal Finance at the minority-owned, Oakland-based investment firm Blaylock Robert Van.

In February 2012, after the Missouri House passed a resolution condemning a contraceptive mandate by President Barack Obama's administration, Jones and six other female Democratic members of the House stated they were kept out of the debate. Jones said that the group "stood and waited to be recognized for two hours" but "never got a chance to speak on an issue that is unique to women." Democrat Margo McNeil argued that the incident was part of a Republican "war on women." Republican John Diehl, who was presiding over the debate, dismissed the allegation that the seven women were ignored, stating that more Democrats were given time to speak than Republicans, and saying "it would take days" to vote on a bill if every member of the House got the chance to speak.

On December 21, 2012, St. Louis Magazine included Jones on its annual "Power List", noting that "Tishaura knows how to cross the aisle. But like her father, she's also known as a blunt critic—which could make for a refreshing change in the city treasurer's office, which has been plagued by scandal and controversy in recent years."

== St. Louis Treasurer (2013–2021) ==
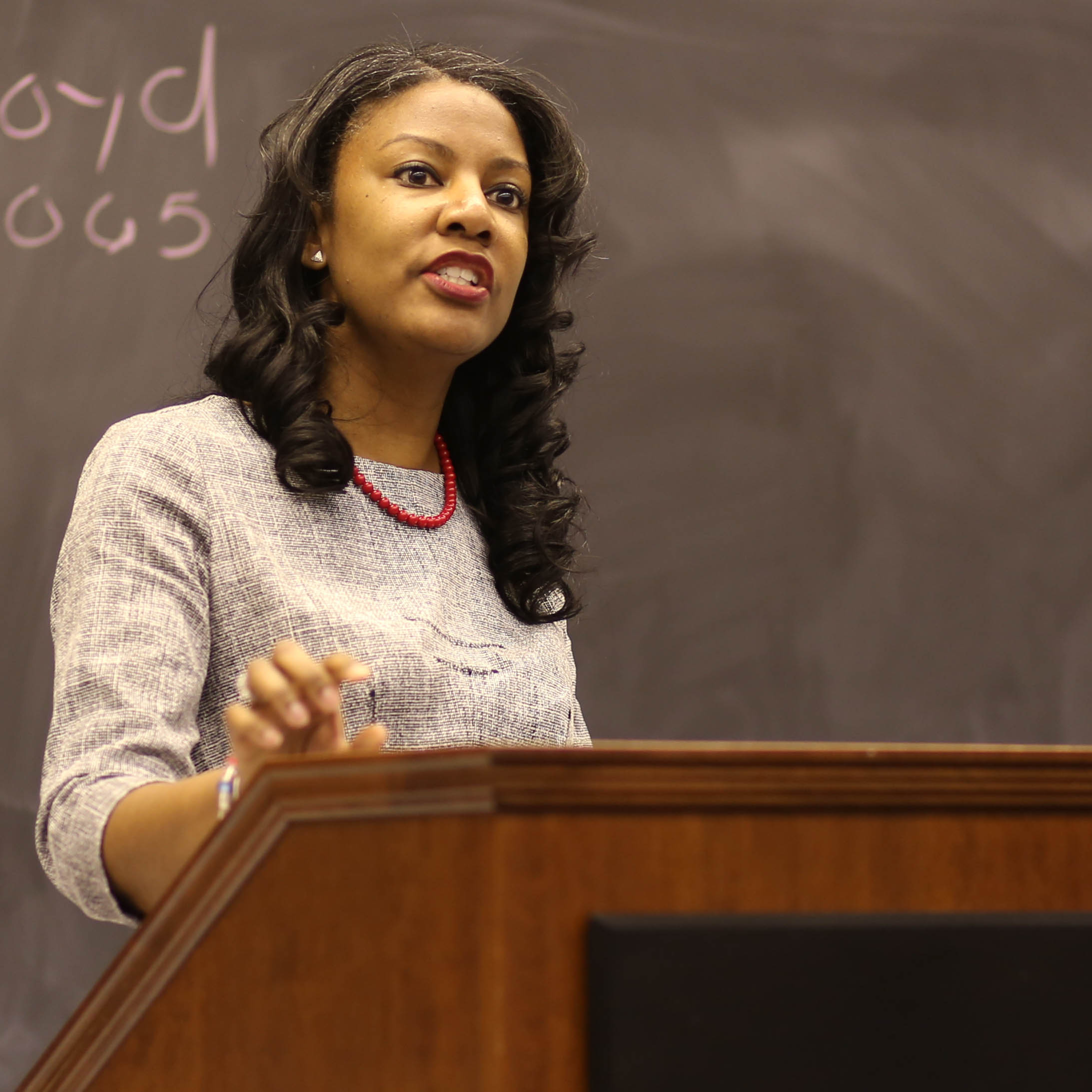
Jones in 2017

Jones served as St. Louis Treasurer between January 1, 2013, and her election as mayor in April 2021.

=== 2012 Treasurer Election ===
In 2012, Jones ran for the position of Treasurer of St. Louis. Her father, Virvus, once again served as her campaign manager. Incumbent Larry Williams, who had been in the office since 1981 and was described by the St. Louis Post-Dispatch as "plagued by scandal nearly from his appointment", decided not to seek re-election. Jones was among four Democratic challengers in the primary election. During the campaign, she argued that Williams's administration had focused too much on parking, and said she would be more transparent about salaries and financial data and make banks more equitable. On July 26, following the Post-Dispatch editorial board's endorsement of Fred Wessels Jr. for treasurer, in which they argued Jones was not qualified enough for the position, she responded to the paper through an interview with The St. Louis American. She stated that in addition to having the same qualifications as Wessels, she additionally had more relevant experience through her work with the investment banking firm Blaylock Robert Van, a fact which the Post-Dispatch did not mention. On August 8, she won the Democratic primary, with Wessels coming in second place. On November 6, she won the general election. After winning the Democratic primary, Jones said her first step as treasurer would be to conduct an independent audit to "see where all the bodies are buried, where the ghosts are" and said the office would undergo a "total house cleaning" of office staff. She also said she would look into offshoring jobs in the treasurer's office to see if that was more cost-effective.

=== First term (2013-2017) ===
Jones was sworn in on January 1, 2013, becoming the first woman to serve as treasurer. One of the "ghost" workers under Williams, Fred W. Robinson, was convicted on charges of wire fraud and submitting false timesheets and was sentenced to two years in prison. Within one month of taking office, Jones fired Robinson and four other employees who were accused of not doing their jobs and costing the city money.

During her time as treasurer, Jones was credited with transforming the office from a bureaucratic seat into a position of advocacy. Koran Addo of the Post-Dispatch noted how Jones had changed the public perception of the treasurer's office and expanded its role:

In the past, the treasurer's office was viewed as a low-profile position a sleepy politician could use to coast into retirement. Under Jones, the office has become something of an advocacy center for financial literacy, offering programs to help people better manage their money and using revenue from parking meters to help needy kids save for college.

As treasurer, Jones partnered with nonprofit financial literacy organization Operation HOPE, Inc. and five local banks to launch a HOPE chapter inside City Hall, the first of its kind. Operation HOPE founder and chairman John Hope Bryant, who described Jones as "my friend", said the program was "done at no direct cost to city residents, thanks to Tishaura's brilliant thinking."

In 2016, Jones spoke at a plenary session alongside Robert Greenstein and Starsky Wilson where she talked about her "firsthand experiences with social movements" following the shooting of Michael Brown and the Ferguson unrest.

=== 2016 Treasurer Election ===
On August 2, 2016, Jones lost an election to become the Democratic Party's committeewoman for the 26th ward but won the uncontested Democratic primary for treasurer. She was re-elected to a second four-year term as treasurer on November 8, 2016, with 76.6 percent of the vote.

=== Second term (2017-2021) ===
In 2017, KMOV reported that Jones had taken 50 trips during her first term as treasurer, including trips to attend conferences and meetings in Chicago, Las Vegas, New York City, Paris, and Washington, D.C. All the trips had been at least partially reimbursed by the city for a total of over $27,000. The report prompted calls for an investigation by two members of the St. Louis Board of Aldermen who alleged the majority of trips were taken for Jones's political benefit. Jones defended herself, stating that the trips were related to her office and denying that any of the trips were a form of kickback. Jones told KMOV "every one of my trips is well-documented and was because I am a leader on a national stage, I have been requested to come to meetings and conferences to speak, and because I have been requested to talk with other executives."

At a press conference, she attacked the report and other reports on scandals as politically motivated to hurt her mayoral campaign. "They are suspicious because of all the candidates running for mayor, I alone have been singled out and subjected to these kinds of attacks," Jones said. "As treasurer, I expect people to hold me accountable for my actions. I also expect the media to be fair and tell the entire story, which has not happened thus far."

In April 2020, Jones signed a $7 million parking meter maintenance contract with a company whose CEO had donated $31,000 to her campaigns since 2013. The issue was brought to a circuit court, which ruled in favor of Jones, finding she did not violate city ordinance.

=== Third term (2021) ===
In her 2020 campaign for a third term as treasurer, Jones was endorsed by Democracy for America, Planned Parenthood, The St. Louis American's editorial board, and the United Auto Workers, as well as by Representative Ayanna Pressley and Senator Elizabeth Warren. On November 3, 2020, Jones was re-elected with 77.6 percent of the vote. Her third term was cut short due to her election as mayor of the city.

== Mayor of St. Louis ==
Jones was elected as Mayor of St. Louis in 2021. She previously ran in the 2017 St. Louis mayoral election, but was defeated in the Democratic primary by moderate Lyda Krewson. On November 4, 2020, after being elected treasurer for a third term, Jones announced she would once again campaign for the mayor's office. She won the 2021 mayoral election against St. Louis Alderwoman Cara Spencer on April 7, 2021, and was sworn in on April 20. She is the third African-American, the second woman, and the first African-American woman to hold the position. (Note: Lyda Krewson, who is white, was elected Mayor of St. Louis in 2017 and became the first woman to hold that office. Before Jones, there were two African-American mayors of St. Louis, both of them men: Freeman Bosley Jr., elected in 1993, and Clarence Harmon, elected in 1997.)

=== 2017 St. Louis mayoral campaign ===
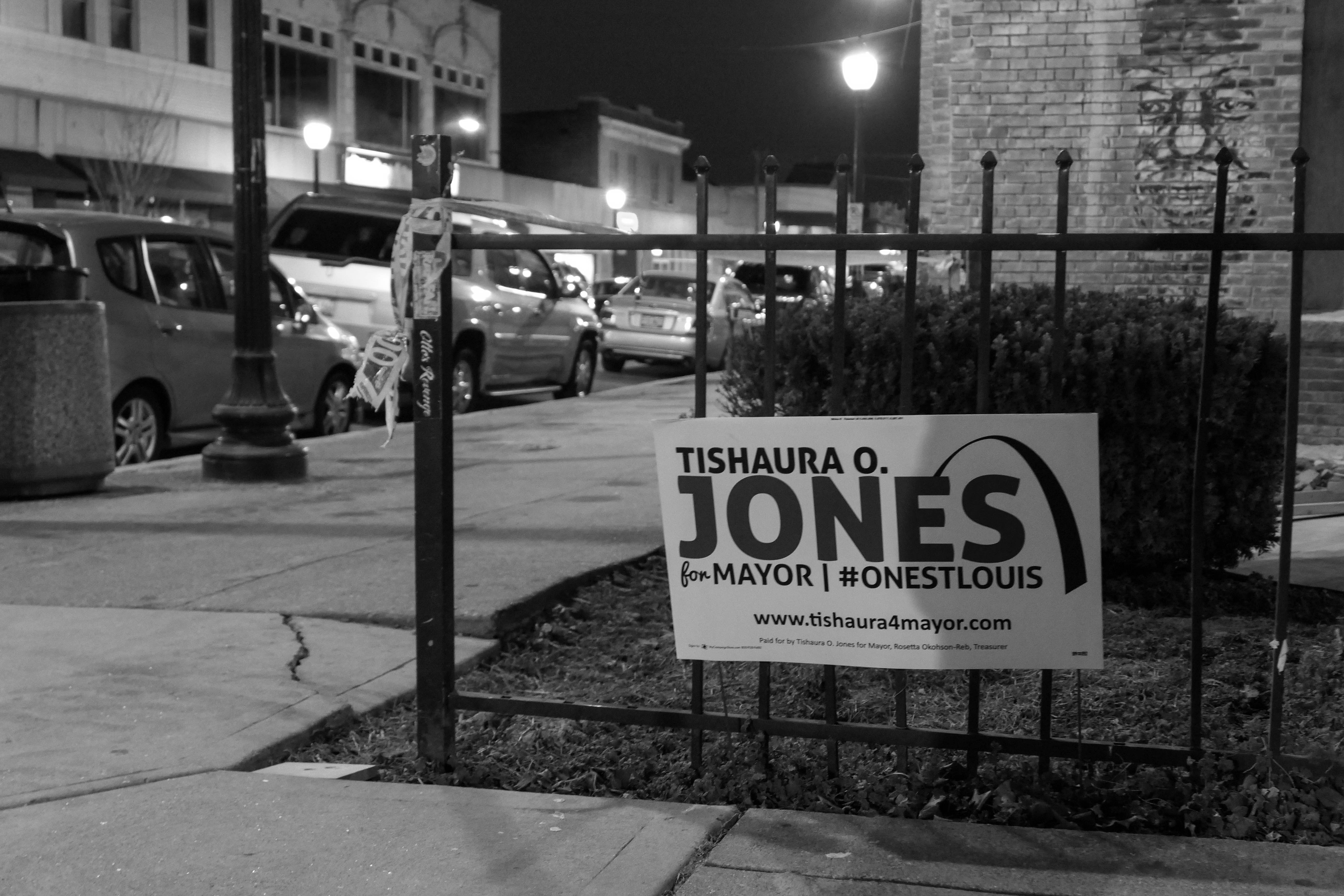
A campaign poster for Jones's 2017 mayoral campaign

A grassroots group of supportive activists calling themselves "Draft Tishaura" helped convince Jones to run for Mayor of St. Louis in 2017. On November 17, 2016, Jones announced her candidacy in the 2017 mayoral election. During the campaign, she received endorsements from the Coalition of Black Trade Unionists, Democracy for America, Missourians Organizing for Reform and Empowerment, MoveOn, NARAL Pro-Choice America, the Service Employees International Union, the Working Families Party, and the Young Democrats of St. Louis, as well as by St. Louis Alderman Chris Carter III, Missouri Secretary of State Jason Kander, Missouri State Senator Jamilah Nasheed, and St. Louis County Assessor Jake Zimmerman. In the Democratic primary on March 7, 2017, Jones finished in second place with 30.4 percent of the vote, losing to Lyda Krewson, who won with 32 percent of the vote. The race was noted for its low turnout, and many commentators speculated that the outcome was racial in nature. (Note: Krewson was the only major white candidate in the Democratic primary. All other candidates who earned over one percent of the vote share (Jones, Lewis E. Reed, Antonio French, and Jeffrey Boyd) were black. Alternatively, Jason Johnson and Symone D. Sanders attributed Jones's loss primarily to the failure of the other black candidates, all men, to drop out once Jones became a clear contender, though Johnson noted that "whites have crossed party lines to coalesce around whatever white candidate is running for mayor, and city districts have been gerrymandered to diffuse black political power.") On April 4, Krewson won the general election.

During the campaign, Jones was notably a target of criticism by the St. Louis Post-Dispatch's editorial board, which ultimately endorsed Antonio French. She alleged that many of the Post-Dispatch's attacks against her were racist, such as a January 21 editorial calling her "high-flying", which she took to mean as a dog whistle for "uppity", and a January 25 column by editorial editor Tod Robberson arguing that the top priority for a mayoral candidate would be to "address blight and abate the graffiti that's killing our city." On February 9, less than one month before the city's Democratic primary, which was tantamount to election, (Note: The last St. Louis mayor who was not a member of the Democratic Party was Aloys P. Kaufmann, a Republican who left office in 1949.) Jones penned an open letter to Robberson, published in The St. Louis American, where she declined an invitation to speak to the editorial board, accused the newspaper of "thinly veiled racism" in its attacks on her, and criticized the editorial board for not having any African-American members. Her letter garnered national media attention, and was received favorably by readers and national press. The letter was viewed by over 250,000 people within a few days, and following the letter's publication, Jones's campaign raised $36,000 in 48 hours.CityLab's Brentin Mock commented that the letter had "become a viral sensation." Jezebel's Prachi Gupta wrote that Jones was "breathing fire" and that one portion of the letter, where Jones referenced the Ferguson unrest, "if delivered as a speech, would take her ten minutes to get through because everyone would be cheering so hard." The Root's Jason Johnson called Jones's letter "savage" and said that "whether she wins the Democratic primary on March 7 or not, one thing is clear: the city of St. Louis, its local Democratic Party and press could use a wake-up call." Jones herself described the letter as her "Fannie Lou Hamer moment." After Jones lost the Democratic primary to Krewson, the Post-Dispatch's attacks continued, with the newspaper's editorial board commenting that a "dose of humility" could have helped Jones's campaign; Jones stated this remark was sexist.

=== 2021 St. Louis mayoral campaign ===
On November 4, 2020, one day after being elected treasurer for a third term, Jones announced her candidacy in the 2021 St. Louis mayoral election, urging her supporters to "say no to business as usual." Jones, alongside Cara Spencer, advanced from the primary election and competed in the general election on April 6, 2021. Jones defeated Spencer in the runoff, becoming the second woman to serve as St. Louis mayor, after incumbent Lyda Krewson, who did not seek re-election.

Endorsements for Tishaura Jones
Endorsements for Tishaura Jones

Federal officials

- Ayanna Pressley, U.S. Representative for Massachusetts's 7th congressional district (2019–present), member of the Boston City Council (2010–2019)
- Elizabeth Warren, U.S. Senator from Massachusetts (2013–present)

State officials

- Rasheen Aldridge Jr., Missouri State Representative (2019–present)
- LaKeySha Frazier-Bosley, Missouri State Representative (2019–present)
- Karla May, Missouri State Senator (2019–present), Missouri State Representative (2011–2019)

Mayors

- Stephen K. Benjamin, Mayor of Columbia, South Carolina (2010–present)
- Melvin Carter, Mayor of Saint Paul (2018–present)
- Michael Hancock, Mayor of Denver (2011–present), member of the Denver City Council (2003–2011)
- Lee Harris, Mayor of Shelby County, Tennessee (2018–present), Tennessee State Senator (2015–2018), member of the Memphis City Council (2011–2015)
- Quinton Lucas, Mayor of Kansas City (2019–present)
- Steven Reed, Mayor of Montgomery (2019–present)
- Frank Scott Jr., Mayor of Little Rock (2019–present)
- Michael Tubbs, Mayor of Stockton (2017–2021)
- Randall Woodfin, Mayor of Birmingham (2017–present)

Local officials

- Wesley Bell, St. Louis County Prosecuting Attorney (2019–present)
- Sam Page, St. Louis County Executive (2019–present), member of the St. Louis County Council (2014–present), Missouri State Representative (2003–2009)

Individuals

- Roland Martin, journalist
- Blake Strode, civil rights lawyer and former professional tennis player

Organizations

- Coalition of Black Trade Unionists
- Communication Workers of America
- Democracy for America
- EMILY's List
- NARAL Pro-Choice America
- Organization for Black Struggle
- People for the American Way
- The People for Bernie Sanders
- Planned Parenthood (Note: Endorsement with Cara Spencer)
- Service Employees International Union
- The St. Louis American
- Young Democrats of St. Louis

=== Mayor of St. Louis (2021–2025) ===
On April 20, 2021, Jones was sworn in as St. Louis' first African-American female mayor during a ceremony held in the City Hall rotunda. That same day, she put forward her administration's budget proposal, which included closing the city's medium-security penitentiary known as The Workhouse. On April 23, Jones announced the formation of an advisory panel to assess how to spend funds St. Louis will receive from the federal government through the American Rescue Plan Act of 2021. On June 17, the Workhouse was closed, with detainees being moved to the City Justice Center. The demolition of the Workhouse began in March of 2025.

== Political positions ==
Jones discussing some of her political positions during a 2018 public service announcement for Run for Something (58 seconds)

Jones politically identifies as a progressive, and has generally been characterized as such by the media. She has described herself as a "Warren Democrat." She opposes incrementalism, instead arguing that "St. Louis needs to change." However, in 2012, St. Louis Magazine wrote that while Jones is "known as a blunt critic," she also "knows how to cross the aisle."

=== Abortion ===
Jones says she supports abortion rights generally, although she has said she would not have an abortion herself. At various points in her political career, she has been endorsed by the pro-choice groups NARAL Pro-Choice America, Planned Parenthood, and #VOTEPROCHOICE.

Jones criticized Missouri Governor Jay Nixon for allowing two bills restricting abortion to become law, and called the bills part of an effort by anti-abortion groups to "slowly but surely chip away at reproductive rights" following Roe v. Wade. Jones also endorsed a statement condemning an abortion law passed by the Missouri General Assembly.

=== Criminal and racial justice ===
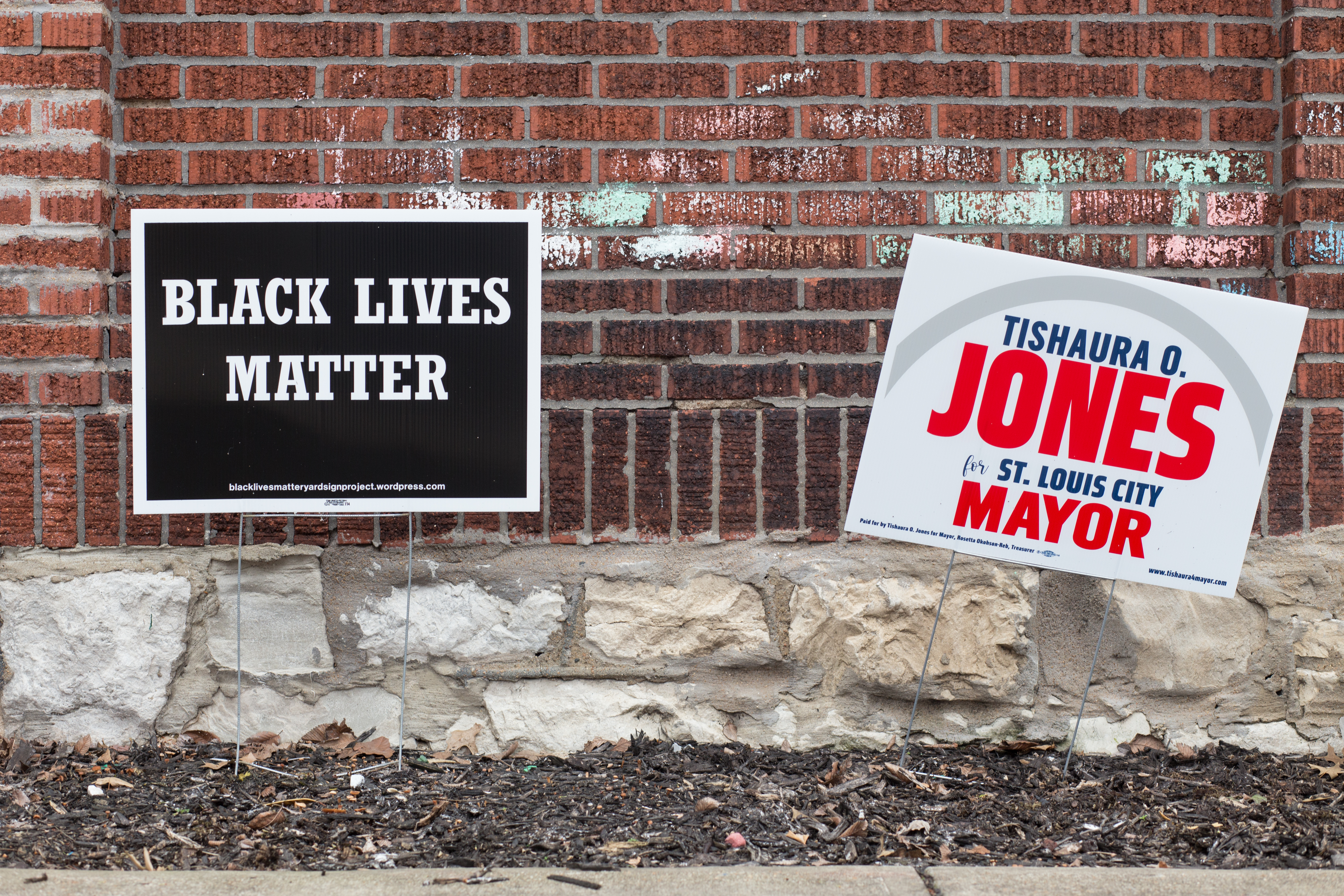
A campaign sign for Jones in 2021, next to a Black Lives Matter sign

Jimmy Tobias of The Nation described Jones as a "champion of Black Lives Matter," writing in 2017 that "if Jones's [2017 mayoral] campaign prevails... the Black Lives Matter movement will clearly, finally, have an unequivocal ally at City Hall." The Associated Press labeled her as "outspoken in her criticism of the criminal justice system's 'arrest and incarcerate' model". She has stated her support for no-judgment drug disposal sites, the abolition of cash bail, focused deterrence, and sobering centers. Experts in criminology have lauded various aspects of the criminal justice agenda put forward in her 2021 campaign, noting that she "has a strong focus on decarceration and decriminalization of minor offenses".

On February 2, 2009, while in the Missouri House of Representatives, Jones introduced a bill that would curtail state intervention into the St. Louis Metropolitan Police Department. The bill was not put up for a vote.

In her 2017 letter to the St. Louis Post-Dispatch published in The St. Louis American, Jones wrote that, if elected mayor, "I will look at every issue through a racial equity lens. I will ask if every decision we make helps those who have been disenfranchised, red-lined and flat-out ignored for way too long. I will look through each and every program in city government and make the changes necessary to ensure that government is working for those people."

On May 17, 2017, Jones started a fundraiser on GoFundMe to remove the Memorial to the Confederate Dead, a Confederate memorial in Forest Park, after St. Louis mayor Lyda Krewson said the only reason the memorial was still up was because it would cost the city too much to remove it. "What I'm trying to do is set the record straight," Jones told The New York Times. "The Confederates, in my opinion, were traitors. And in this country, we honor patriots." The fundraiser reached $17,545 of its $25,000 goal. On June 26, Krewson's administration agreed to give the memorial to the Missouri Civil War Museum in exchange for the museum arranging to pay for the memorial's removal and store it until it was displayed; Jones subsequently announced that all funds raised by the campaign would go to the city's Parks, Recreation and Forestry Department.

Jones has advocated for closing the controversial St. Louis Medium Security Institution (known as the "St. Louis Workhouse"), which she has called a "rat hole", citing "a damning list of abuses, including sexual harassment, medical neglect, extended or mistaken incarceration, and negligence resulting in death" at the facility. As treasurer, she formally recommended that the institution be closed, arguing that "the city currently spends $254 million a year repeatedly arresting the same people, trying them, and incarcerating them."

On June 26, 2020, Jones criticized Mayor Krewson and called on her to resign after Krewson listed the names, addresses, and proposed police budgets of several protesters calling to defund the police during a Facebook Live stream, a move which critics said was doxing. "It was irresponsible for the Mayor to publicize the names and addresses of her constituents, who were exercising their constitutional right to free speech and to petition their government," Jones tweeted. "I echo the calls for Mayor Krewson's resignation. Constituents should not fear retaliation for expressing their opinions on how our government aligns its spending priorities."

Jones supports decriminalizing sex work, and instead providing prostitutes with housing, unemployment resources and drug addiction treatment.

In June 2021, Jones was one of 11 U.S. mayors to form Mayors Organized for Reparations and Equity (MORE), a coalition of municipal leaders dedicated to starting pilot reparations programs in their cities. Jones, along with Kansas City, Missouri Mayor Quinton Lucas, is a member of MORE's coalition board. In April 2022, Jones signed a bill allowing voluntary donations to a reparations fund. The bill allows St. Louis residents to donate to the fund in their property tax and water and refuse collection bills. The reparations bill, sponsored by a city alderman, was vague on details about eligibility and the potential disbursements of the funds.

=== Education ===
On January 10, 2012, while in the Missouri House of Representatives, Jones introduced a bill to set stricter requirements for charter management organizations. Though the bill was voted "do pass" in committee, the bill was never voted on. On April 19, after the Missouri State Board of Education voted to close six St. Louis charter schools operated by the Virginia-based company Imagine Schools, Jones argued that her proposed bill could have stopped the schools from being closed.

In November 2015, as treasurer, Jones created a program that opens a savings account for every St. Louis kindergarten student in public school, funded entirely from revenue earned by parking meters. The program, called "College Kids", is meant to work as a SEED fund that accrues interest until high school graduation. It includes several incentive programs, such as matched savings up to $100, rewards for perfect attendance, and deposits when parents complete courses on financial education. Jones said the program was inspired by a similar initiative by San Francisco treasurer José Cisneros. On June 9, 2015, she was recognized by the Clinton Global Initiative for her work with the program.

=== Gun violence ===
Jones believes that gun control is necessary to reduce violent crime. She also believes that the government needs to do more to address poverty in regards to violence, saying that "if we can't get the guns off the streets, then what are we doing to get resources down to the grassroots to help the people who are affected?" She has referenced Aristotelianism in her beliefs about the connection between poverty and violence.

In 2019, Jones criticized St. Louis mayor Lyda Krewson for offering a $25,000 reward, paid for by billionaire political donor Rex Sinquefield, for information regarding the gun-related death of a child, which led St. Louis Post-Dispatch columnist Bill McClellan to favorably dub Jones "the Shadow Mayor of St. Louis." On September 15, 2019, Jones joined in a protest march against gun violence led by Moms Demand Action and other mothers' advocacy groups.

=== Immigration ===
Jones supports increasing immigration to the United States and believes that "immigrants should be seen as an asset, not a burden." Jones is in favor of making St. Louis a sanctuary city, and said during her 2017 mayoral campaign that if elected, she would create an "Office of New Americans" providing assistance to immigrants. She supports a city identification card program. Jones has praised Mayor of New York City Bill de Blasio on immigration, and said she reached out to him during her 2017 campaign "to ask how we can follow his lead.

=== Public health ===
On January 13, 2011, Jones introduced a bill to the Missouri House of Representatives requiring the Missouri Department of Health and Senior Services to post resources on umbilical cord blood banking on its website. The bill passed 149–1 in the House on April 5, with only Linda Black voting against it, and its companion bill passed unanimously in the Missouri Senate on April 28. The bill was signed by Missouri Governor Jay Nixon on July 8.

On February 7, 2012, Jones introduced two bills to the Missouri House related to lupus: the first to designate each May as "Lupus Awareness Month" in Missouri, and the second to create a checkoff on income tax forms for a "Lupus Revolving Research Trust Fund." The first bill was passed by the House unanimously on March 28, but was not voted on by the Senate. The second was referred to the House Ways and Means committee, which did not make a decision on it.

As treasurer, Jones suspended parking tickets in St. Louis during the COVID-19 pandemic and made parking meters free.

== Personal life ==
On December 29, 1995, Jones's father, Virvus, was convicted on two counts of fraud and sentenced to one year and one day in prison. The conviction resurfaced during Jones's first bid for mayor, after the St. Louis Post-Dispatch reported on links between the treasurer's office and Craig Walker, a banker who was convicted in the same case. Virvus Jones had defeated James Shrewsbury in the 1993 St. Louis comptroller Democratic primary, a race where Walker had funded the campaign of "stalking horse candidate" Penny Alcott. Both were sentenced to prison, and Virvus Jones was barred from running for office again. In 2016, the Post-Dispatch reported that IFS Securities, an investment banking and brokerage firm based in Atlanta, where Walker was the vice president for public finance, was doing business with the treasurer's office. When asked by the Post-Dispatch, Jones responded that "no company is squeaky clean, and Mr. Walker has paid his debt to society." Jones later called the report a "smear", and the St. Louis American editorial board called them racist, in an editorial headlined "Post is 'black' up to its old tricks".

Jones's mother, Laura, died of cancer in November 2000. Jones has one son, who was born in 2007.

In 2020, Jones endorsed Senator Elizabeth Warren and then Senator Bernie Sanders in the Democratic Party presidential primaries.

On June 10, 2020, Jones revealed in a Facebook post that she was undergoing surgery for uterine fibroids.

== See also ==
- Black women in American politics
- List of Bernie Sanders 2020 presidential campaign endorsements
- List of Elizabeth Warren 2020 presidential campaign endorsements

== Works cited ==
- Bryant, John Hope (2020). The Memo. Berrett-Koehler Publishers. ISBN 9781523084579.
- Freixas, Catalina; Abbott, Mark (2018). Segregation by Design. Springer International Publishing. ISBN 9783319729565.
- Friedline, Terri (2020). Banking on a Revolution. Oxford University Press. ISBN 978-0-19-094413-1.
- Halvorsen, Ryan; Montgomery, Breigh; Rodgers, Helen; Reynolds, Nathan (2016). If Not Now, When? Taking Charge of the Next Generation (PDF). Coro.
- Wright, John A. Sr.; Wright, John A. Jr.; Wright, Curtis A. (2016). African American St. Louis. Arcadia Publishing. ISBN 9781467115094.

Political offices
Preceded by Lyda Krewson	Mayor of St. Louis; 2021–2025	Succeeded by Cara Spencer
