= Lewis E. Reed =

American politician (born 1962)

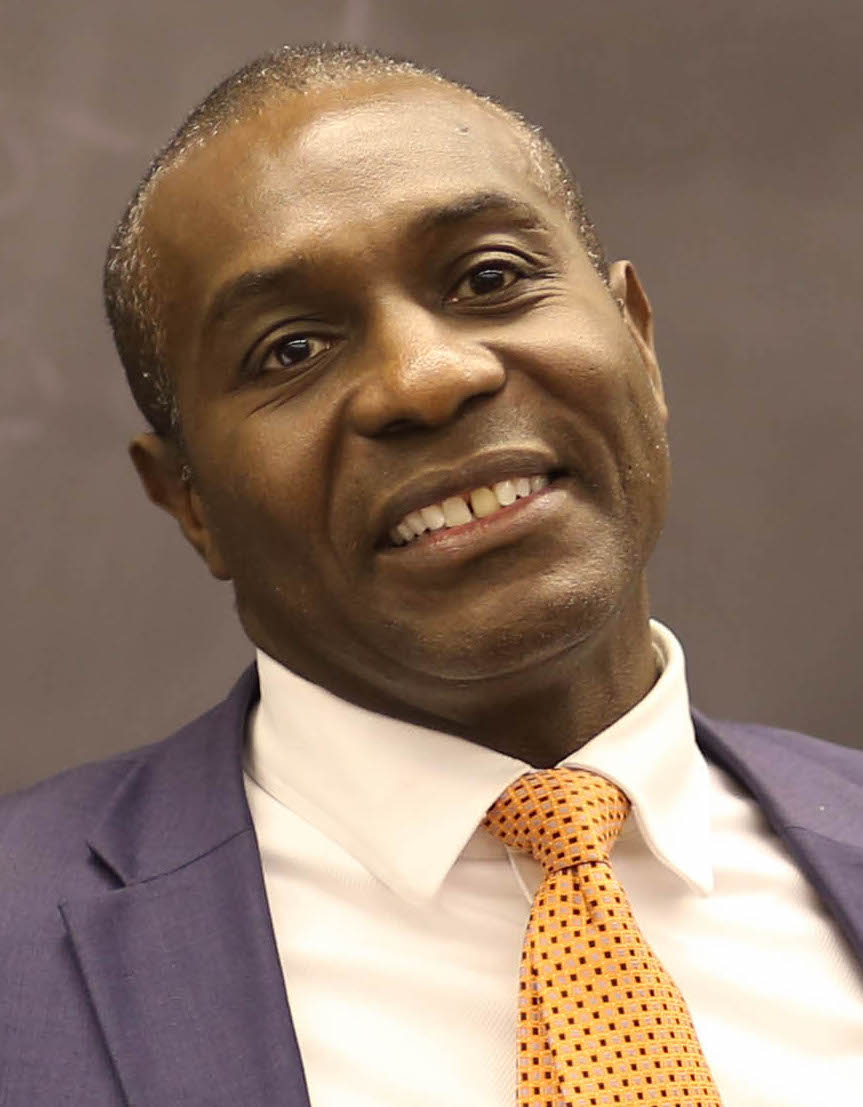
- Reed in 2017

President of the St. Louis Board of Aldermen
- In office April 3, 2007 – June 7, 2022
- Preceded by: James F. Shrewsbury
- Succeeded by: Joseph Vollmer (interim); Megan Green

Personal details
- Born: October 9, 1962 (age 64)
- Party: Democratic
- Spouse: Mary Entrup
- Education: Southern Illinois University Edwardsville

Lewis E. Reed (born October 9, 1962) is a former American politician. His last position was president of its Board of Aldermen which he held for a record duration of 15 years. He was federally indicted on bribery charges in May 2022 and resigned his at large board position in June.

In August 2022, Reed pled guilty to bribery charges and was later sentenced to serve three years and nine months in an Arkansas prison and fined $18,500. Reed started serving his prison sentence in Arkansas in January 2023.

== Education ==
After graduating high school, Reed attended Southern Illinois University Edwardsville on a wrestling scholarship.

== Political career ==
Reed was elected alderman of the city's sixth ward in 1999. He helped spur the revitalization of Lafayette Square and Gate District. He also drafted several ordinances to target investment along Washington Avenue, using historic tax credits, low-income housing tax credits and tax increment financing (TIF). Reed worked with Lafayette Square residents and the city's Parks Department to draft and adopt a comprehensive master plan for the restoration of Lafayette Square Park. Reed then worked with developers to transform an old junkyard into Park Plaza, a public space that features a fountain, benches and green space. The TIF district boundaries have since been expanded.

== President of the Board of Aldermen ==
In 2007, Reed introduced and passed Board Bills 362 and 351, which were codified as Ordinance 67794 and Ordinance 67774, submitting to a one-half of one percent sales tax increase on retail sales for the purpose of "providing revenues for the operation of public safety departments of the city including hiring more police officers, police and firefighter compensation, prosecuting more criminals, nuisance crimes and problem properties, and funding police and fire pensions." This "Public Safety Protection Sales Tax" was approved by voters, passing with 54.95% of votes cast.

The city's Preservation Review Ordinance was amended in the late 1990s to exclude certain parts of North St. Louis.

On January 11, 2016, Reed was a guest on Bob Romanik's radio show On the Dark Side. In addition to being a controversial shock jock radio host, Romanik is a former strip club owner, police chief, and convicted felon, as well as a top donor to Reed's 2013 mayoral campaign. During the interview, Romanik referred to St. Louis Alderwoman Megan Green as a "no-count, low-life, good-for-nothing, skanky bitch" who deserves to be "flushed down the toilet" and "makes me ashamed to be white." Reed laughed at several of Romanik's remarks. Romanik then made a reference to Green getting sexually assaulted by Pinocchio, before giving Reed the last few minutes of the show "to be diplomatic and nice to this lady... if you want to clean up my crap on Megan Green, whatever, you got the last couple minutes." However, Reed did not apologize to Green or distance himself from Romanik's comments, instead criticizing Green further and endorsing Romanik, a Republican, in his campaign for District 114 of the Illinois House of Representatives. The situation was criticized by Green and by St. Louis Mayor Francis Slay. On February 8, Reed apologized for not challenging Romanik and called Romanik's statements "completely out of line."

In 2016, Reed's wife Mary Entrup, a former St. Louis judge, ran for a seat on the city's Democratic Party Central Committee. Entrup was challenged by Allison Drieth, the executive director of Missouri's NARAL Pro-Choice America chapter. Reed's chief of staff Tom Shepard arranged a meeting with Dreith's husband, Jake McDaniel, through McDaniel's boss at a teachers union, to coerce Dreith into dropping out of the race and instead running for another position. McDaniel secretly recorded the meeting and leaked the audio to The Riverfront Times. In the meeting, Shepard calls Drieth's campaign "a distraction" to Reed and asks McDaniel "is there anything else that she would want to do that we could support her, running for alderwoman or president of the board?" When asked by The Riverfront Times, Shepard initially claimed that the meeting never took place, and later claimed that the meeting was done "in the interest of party unity" and that Reed was not aware of the meeting.

In February 2017, the Board of Aldermen passed a bill sponsored by Reed to issue funding of $64 million in bonds for renovations to the Scottrade Center. Critics pointed towards campaign contributions to Reed from a minority owner of the St. Louis Blues of $165,000 as a conflict of interest. Reed responded to the perception of quid pro quo, stating: "That's not the way I operate. I've put a ton of my own money into my campaigns, and I'll do the same for this campaign. You can't buy me."

In December 2018, as Reed was running for re-election against State Senator Jamilah Nasheed, a publication called The St. Louis Guardian made several ads attacking Nasheed. An investigation by The Riverfront Times found that the Guardian was not a registered business in Missouri, and that its publisher, Anthony McDonald, was a member of Reed's 2013 mayoral campaign and had donated several thousand dollars to Reed. Reed expressed support for the ads, saying his campaign would like to buy and repackage them, which they later did. After initial reporting by The Riverfront Times, McDonald lashed out in an editorial, saying "Sorry Riverfront Times but I’m not under white rule!!!!" The Guardian only published one print issue, after which McDonald was hired by Reed's campaign.

In February 2019, while campaigning for re-election as Board of Aldermen president, Reed argued that Nasheed was ineligible to run due to her name, and Reed's chief of staff, Tom Shepard, officially requested that Nasheed be removed from the Democratic primary ballot. Nasheed, who was born Jenice Ann Williams, had changed her name after converting to Islam. Reed's actions were criticized by the Council on American–Islamic Relations, which called the move an "Islamophobic attack" and called on Reed to apologize; he did not. Nasheed's campaign responded by presenting a 2005 court order showing Nasheed had legally changed her name, as well as a yearbook photo of Reed captioned "Louis Reed," which Shepard claimed was likely a misspelling. On March 5, Reed narrowly defeated Nasheed to win a fourth term as Board of Aldermen president.

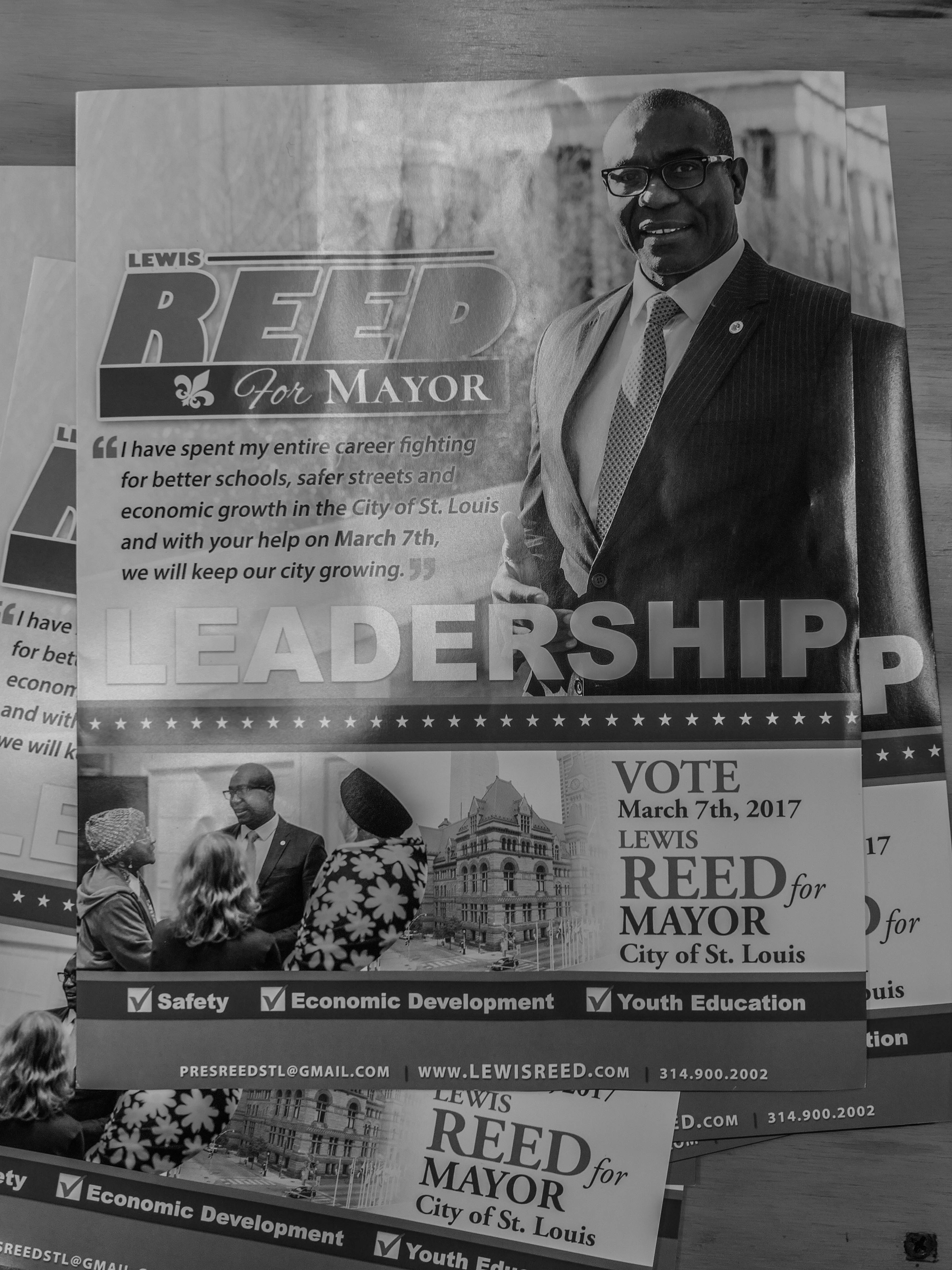
Flyers for Reed's 2017 mayoral campaign

On June 23, 2020, Reed and Senator Roy Blunt were sued by the American Civil Liberties Union and the Washington University School of Law First Amendment clinic on behalf of two constituents who had been blocked by the politicians on social media after criticizing them.

On June 24, 2020, Reed introduced Board Bill 71 to include a vote for the St. Louis Lambert International Airport to be privatized on the November ballot. Reed was criticized by nine members from the Board of Aldermen, who argued that Reed was attempting to help St. Louis billionaire Rex Sinquefield recoup $44 million spent on exploring the airport privatization. The plan was eventually abandoned.

== Mayoral campaigns ==
Reed ran for Mayor of St. Louis three times:

- 2013 mayoral election—Reed lost in the Democratic Party primary to longtime incumbent mayor Francis Slay
- 2017 mayoral election.—Reed came in third place out of seven candidates in the Democratic primary earning 18.3 percent of the vote. The two candidates who received more votes were Lyda Krewson and Tishaura Jones who received 32 percent and 30.4 percent of the vote respectively.
- 2021 mayoral election, Reed came in third place in the primary election, and was eliminated in the unified primary adopted by St. Louis in 2020. He lost despite receiving the endorsements of Aldermen John Collins-Muhammad, Shameem Clark-Hubbard, Marlene Davis, Carol Howard, Brandon Bosley and Jack Coatar. the St. Louis Post-Dispatch editorial board, and the United Food and Commercial Workers,

== Bribery conviction ==
Reed was President of the Board of Alderman of the for a record-long fifteen years. However, on May 25, 2022, Reed (along with Jeffrey Boyd and John Collins-Muhammad) were indicted on felony charges by federal grand jury for corruption involving allegedly taking bribes in support for facilitating property tax abatements. On June 7, Reed resigned as president effectively immediately. An ally of Reed, Joe Vollmer, succeeded him as acting president. In August 2022, Reed pleaded guilty to bribery charges. In December 2022, Reed was sentenced to serve three years and nine months in prison, to be served in a minimum-security camp adjacent to FCI Forrest City in Forrest City, Arkansas. Additionally, Reed will be required to pay an $18,500 fine due to his offenses, which include receiving $18,500 in bribe money. Reed started serving his prison sentence in Arkansas in January 2023.

== Personal life ==
Reed is married to Mary Entrup, a former St. Louis judge.
