= Lyda Krewson =

Mayor of St. Louis, Missouri

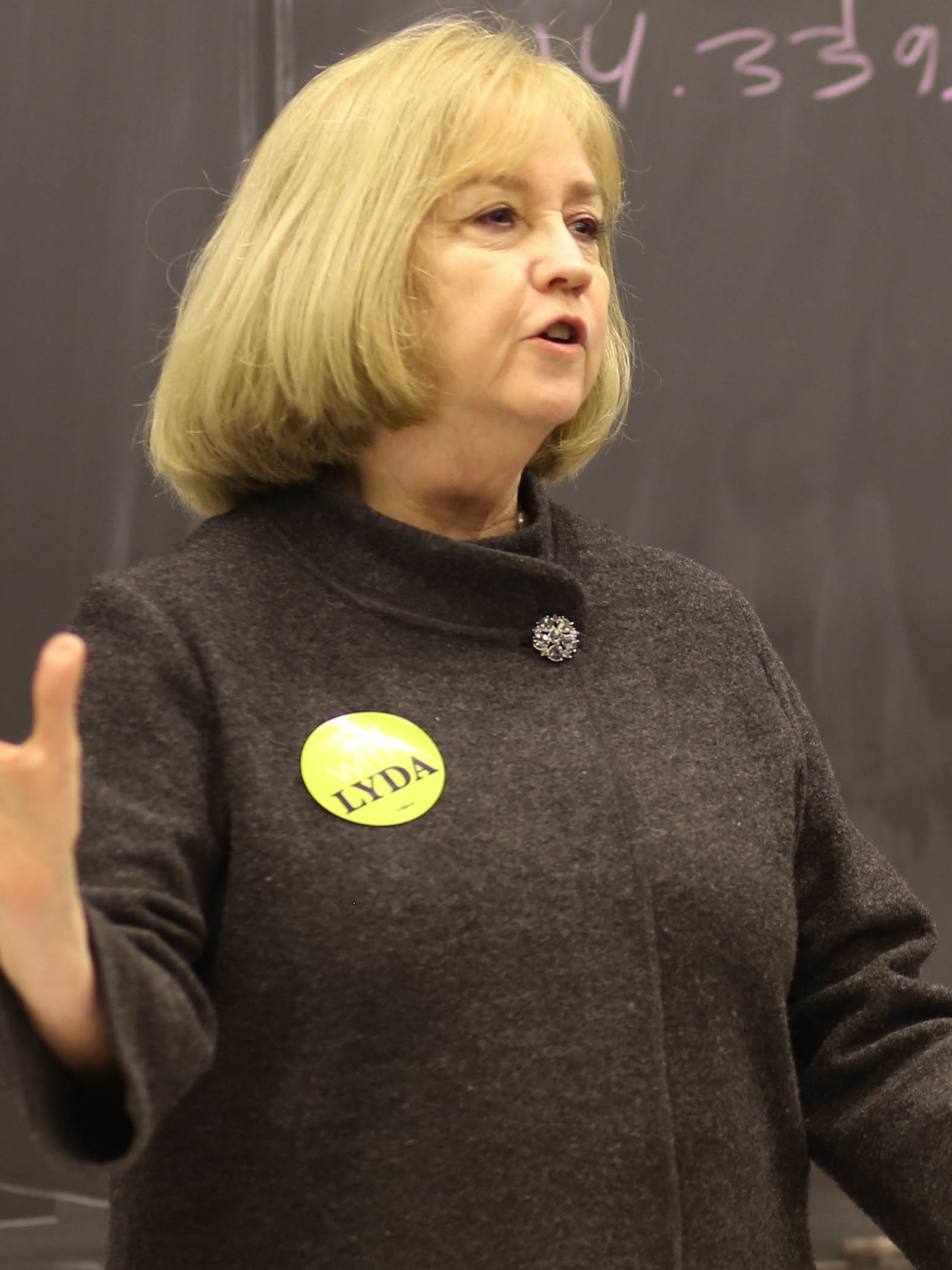
- Krewson in 2017

46th Mayor of St. Louis
- In office April 18, 2017 – April 20, 2021
- Preceded by: Francis Slay
- Succeeded by: Tishaura Jones

Member of the St. Louis Board of Aldermen for Ward 28
- In office 1997–2017
- Succeeded by: Heather Navarro

Personal details
- Born: November 14, 1953 (age 72) Davenport, Iowa, U.S.
- Party: Democratic
- Spouse(s): Jeff Krewson (m. 1988; died 1995) Mike Owens (m. 1998)
- Children: 2
- Education: Truman State University (BA); University of Missouri, St. Louis (BS)

Lyda Krewson (born November 14, 1953) is an American retired politician who was the 46th mayor of St. Louis, Missouri. She is a member of the Democratic Party and St. Louis's first female mayor, serving from 2017 to 2021. On November 18, 2020, Krewson announced that she would not seek a second term.

From 1997 to 2017, Krewson served as the alderman of St. Louis's 28th ward.

== Early life ==
Born on November 14, 1953, near Davenport, Iowa, Krewson moved with her family to St. Joseph, Missouri, then Fairfield, Illinois, before settling in Moberly, Missouri, where she graduated from high school. In 1974, she earned a degree in psychology and a special education minor from Northeast Missouri State University. Krewson then moved to St. Louis, where she earned an accounting degree at the University of Missouri, St. Louis.

In 1988 she married Jeff Krewson, an architect. He was murdered by a criminal on parole in an attempted carjacking in front of their Central West End house in 1995; she and their two young children were also in the car. The killer was later sentenced to life without parole. In 1998, Krewson married local news anchor Mike Owens.

Krewson is a Certified Public Accountant. She worked for Deloitte for seven years, then served as the chief financial officer of PGAV, an international design and planning firm.

== Political career ==
While alderman of St. Louis's 28th ward, Krewson took out a home equity loan in 2003 to help fund an unsuccessful campaign against Missouri's concealed carry law, which passed. In 2011, she led the city's successful effort to pass a smoking ban. Krewson served as the chairman of the Board of Aldermen's Transportation & Commerce Committee. Previously she served as the chairman of the Ways & Means, Convention & Tourism, and Parks & Environment committees.

Results of the mayoral election by ward

With the retirement of four-term mayor Francis Slay, Krewson entered a crowded seven-way 2017 Democratic primary, the real contest in this heavily Democratic city (St. Louis has not elected a Republican mayor since 1949). She won the March 7 primary against Tishaura Jones, Lewis E. Reed, Antonio French, and others with 32% of the vote, just 879 votes ahead of Jones. In the general election on April 4, she defeated Republican candidate Andrew Jones with 67% of the vote, becoming the first female chief executive in the city's history. She took office on April 18.

St. Louis Mayor, General Election 2017
| Party | Candidate | Votes | % |
|---|---|---|---|
| Democratic | Lyda Krewson | 39,471 | 67.53 |
| Republican | Andrew Jones Jr. | 10,112 | 17.30 |
| Independent | Larry Rice | 6,126 | 10.48 |
| Green | Johnathan McFarland | 1,241 | 2.14 |
| Libertarian | Robert Cunningham | 515 | 0.88 |
| Independent | Tyrone Austin | 241 | 0.41 |
| N/A | Write-in Votes | 737 | 1.26 |

=== Panhandling and homelessness ===
Krewson worked to reduce panhandling in the Central West End neighborhood by introducing the REAL Change Program, which encourages social services for those in need. The program was attached to an ordinance to criminalize panhandling. During the 2017 mayoral campaign, The St. Louis American newspaper criticized the program, arguing that Krewson did not understand the factors behind poverty and homelessness.

A legal battle initiated by Francis Slay's administration against Larry Rice's New Life Evangelistic Center homeless shelter came to a close in April 2017, early in Krewson's mayoralty, allowing the city to close the shelter, which provided temporary housing for up to 150 people. The city-owned Biddle House shelter expanded to provide beds for 50 more people. At least two people died in the streets without housing the previous winter.

=== Crime prevention ===
In August 2019, Krewson agreed to sponsor a one-year contract with Cure Violence in response to community pressure and an increased city murder rate. Previous measures from Krewson's administration had focused on increasing policing, while Cure Violence trains civilians in crisis intervention and community based solutions. Aldermanic President Lewis E. Reed told reporters that he supported additional funding for the program.

In April, Comptroller Darlene Green raised the issue of the local medium-security prison known as the St. Louis Workhouse causing violence, advocating that Krewson move to close it. Advocates and activists have campaigned for the Workhouse's closure, citing inhumane conditions and criminalization of poverty. The city was sued in 2017 after people incarcerated in the Workhouse were heard screaming for help during a heat wave and large protests were staged outside the fence. The city responded by installing temporary air conditioning units.

=== Facebook Live incident ===
In a public briefing broadcast live on Facebook on June 26, 2020, Krewson read aloud the names and addresses of multiple constituents, including a minor, who had signed a petition in favor of budgetary changes that involved redirecting all the money spent on the police department to social services, affordable housing and Cure Violence. She apologized later that day and removed the post after protesters showed up at her house. The American Civil Liberties Union of Missouri released a statement condemning her actions, saying "[i]t serves no apparent purpose beyond intimidation."

After the Facebook Live incident, local activist and drag performer Maxi Glamour created a petition calling for Krewson's resignation that collected more than 30,000 signatures in two days. 500 Black Lives Matter protesters marched to Krewson's home to demand her resignation, the closure of St. Louis Workhouse, and defunding of the St. Louis Metropolitan Police Department. On the way to her home, the protesters traveled through the Central West End neighborhood and took a shortcut through a private gated community, Portland Place. When protesters entered the private street through a gate, there was a confrontation between them and the residents of the adjacent house, who brandished a rifle and handgun.

Political offices
| Preceded by Francis Slay | Mayor of St. Louis; 2017–2021 | Succeeded by Tishaura Jones |
