= John Collins-Muhammad =

American activist & politician (born 1991)

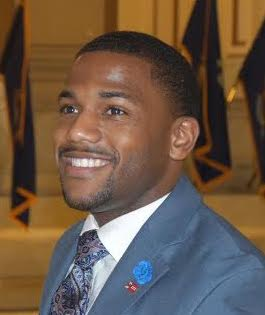
- Collins-Muhammad in 2017

Alderman for the 21st Ward of St. Louis
- In office April 2017 – May 2022
- Preceded by: Antonio D. French

Personal details
- Born: 1991 (age 34–35) St. Louis, Missouri, U.S.
- Party: Democratic
- Spouse: Asia Collins Muhammad ()
- Education: Lincoln University of Missouri

John Collins-Muhammad Jr. (born 1991) is a former American politician and Nation of Islam minister from the state of Missouri. He led protests during the 2014 Ferguson Uprising and served on the Board of Aldermen of the City of St. Louis representing the 21st Ward. Collins-Muhammad was elected to his first term in April 2017 at the age of 25. He was re-elected to a second term in April 2021, but resigned in May 2022 amid an indictment for federal corruption and bribery charges.

== Early life and education ==
Collins-Muhammad was raised in North City, St. Louis, Missouri in the Greater Ville Neighborhood. An alumnus of St. Mary's High School, he completed his studies in political science and history at two HBCU’s in Missouri; Lincoln University in Jefferson City and Harris-Stowe State University in Saint Louis. Collins-Muhammad has a twin sister, Jazmine who is a public educator, and a younger sister, Kimberly-Ann Collins, who is a Missouri state representative. His mother, Dr. LaTonia Collins-Smith, is president at Harris-Stowe State University in St. Louis.

While in college, Collins-Muhammad worked as a legislative Intern in the Missouri Capitol building.

Collins-Muhammad is a member of the Nation of Islam under Louis Farrakhan.

== Ferguson Protest ==
Collins-Muhammad was a leader in the protest movement following the 2014 death of teenager Michael Brown in Ferguson, Missouri. He expressed criticism of police militarization and the way the crisis was handled within the community. During the protests, Collins-Muhammad was among the protesters who were tear-gassed by law enforcement and policing agencies. He assisted in the organizing of rallies, events, and protest demonstrations calling for the resignation of Ferguson Police Chief Tom Jackson and the immediate arrest of police officer Darren Wilson. Collins-Muhammad was subjected to surveillance by the Federal Bureau of Investigation (FBI), and was fired from the Village of Uplands Park in St. Louis County for making inflammatory remarks on national television about the shooting of two St. Louis area police officers. Fellow Ferguson protester and Black Lives Matter surrogate Tory Russell is a known associate of Collins-Muhammad and served as his campaign manager.

== Political career ==
Prior to running for Alderman, Collins-Muhammad, in 2016 ran unsuccessfully for Missouri state representative of the 77th district placing second in a four-way race losing narrowly to Steve Roberts, Jr. Collins-Muhammad was elected to his first term as Alderman for the city's 21st Ward in an April 2017 special election following Antonio D. French's vacation of the seat to run for Mayor.

In the Board of Aldermen, Collins-Muhammad served on the following committees; and served as Chair for the Education & Youth Matters Committee.

- Ways & Means
- Public Safety
- Housing & Urban Development
- Transportation & Commerce
- Public Utilities
- Intergovernmental Affairs

In 2017, Collins-Muhammad proposed a major redevelopment plan on Natural Bridge Avenue that included a blighting, a 15-year tax abatement on property, and additional funding in Tax Increment Financing to developers.

During the 2017 St. Louis protests, Collins-Muhammad presented an honorary resolution remembering Anthony Lamar Smith that was unanimously approved. The resolution was heavily criticized by Jeff Roorda of the St. Louis police officers association.

In 2018, Collins-Muhammad opened an emergency homeless shelter at St. Peter community center housing up to 150 people per night and operated 24 hours a day. St. Peter community center is owned by St. Peter African Methodist Episcopal church in St. Louis. Collins-Muhammad also wrote an open letter to the Missouri Governor to call attention to the homeless epidemic in St. Louis.

Collins-Muhammad sponsored legislation creating the one dollar housing program; a year-long pilot program aimed at selling residential properties owned by the city's real estate department known as Land Re-utilization Authority for $1.00. The legislation established a lease program in which interested developers could obtain an 18-month lease on the property, and undertake a rehabilitation that would need to be completed in that time frame.

In Fall 2018, Collins-Muhammad was arrested by the Florissant Police Department for failure to pay parking and traffic tickets and driving with a suspended license. Collins-Muhammad had warrants for traffic violations in three St. Louis area municipalities.

In 2019, Collins-Muhammad introduced a Board Bill creating “ban the box” to prohibit discrimination in job hiring or promotion decisions based on applicants’ criminal histories.

Collins-Muhammad was re-elected in 2021 to another term.

In the 2021-2022 legislative session, Collins-Muhammad served on the special COVID-19 response committee and worked on allocating the American Rescue Plan Act of 2021 in housing development, the city's Department of Health, and utility, rental, and mortgage assistance for residents.

== Bribery conviction ==
On May 25, 2022 Collins-Muhammad along with longtime Board of Aldermen President Lewis E. Reed and 22nd Ward Alderman Jeffrey Boyd were indicted by federal grand jury for felony corruption and bribery charges. Collins-Muhammad, Reed, and Boyd all pled guilty in August 2022.

== Political offices ==
Political offices
Preceded by Antonio French	Alderman of St. Louis's 21st Ward; 2017–2022	Succeeded by Laura Keys
