= 2017 St. Louis mayoral election =

- April 4, 2017
- Turnout: 30.12%
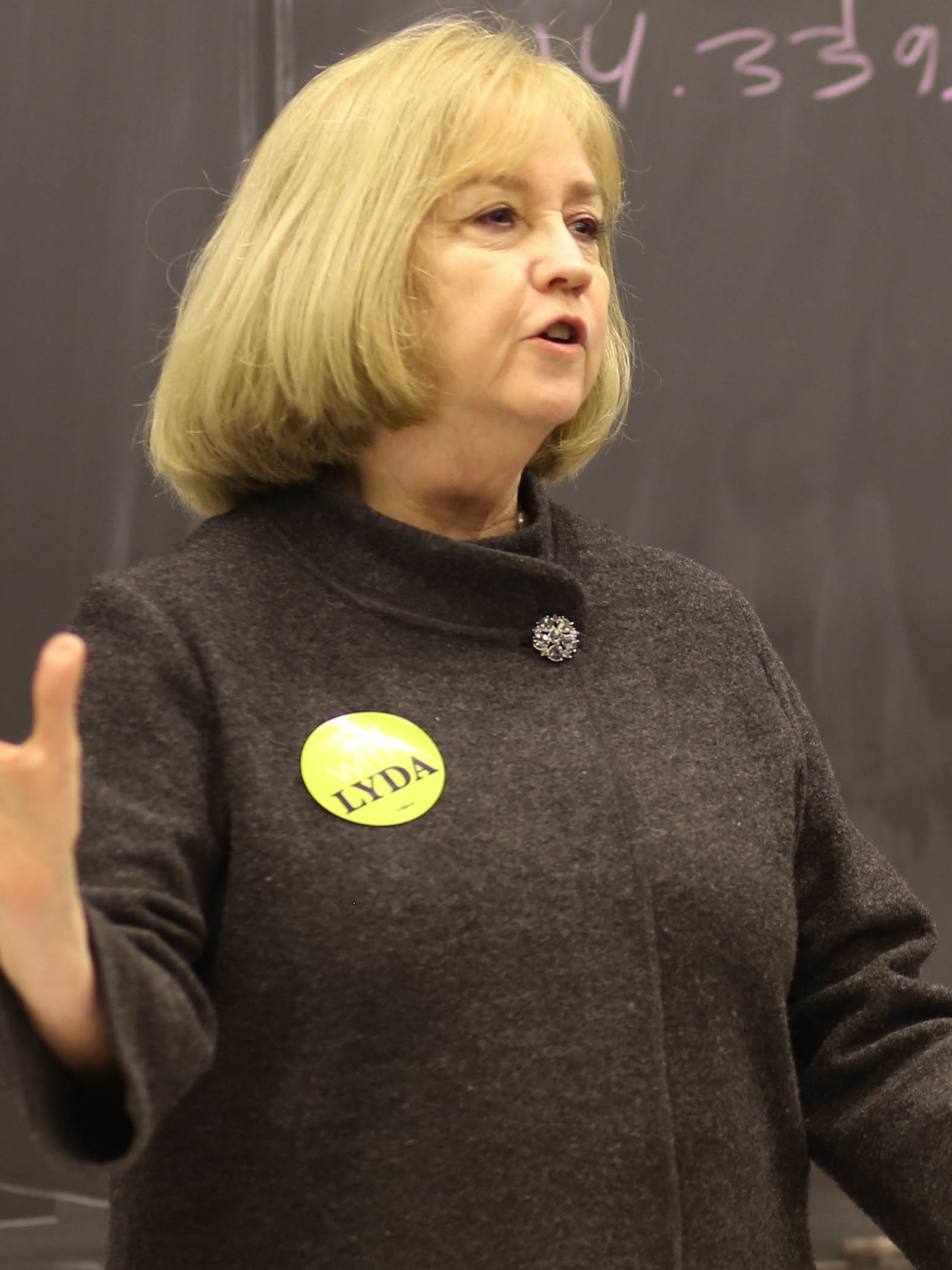

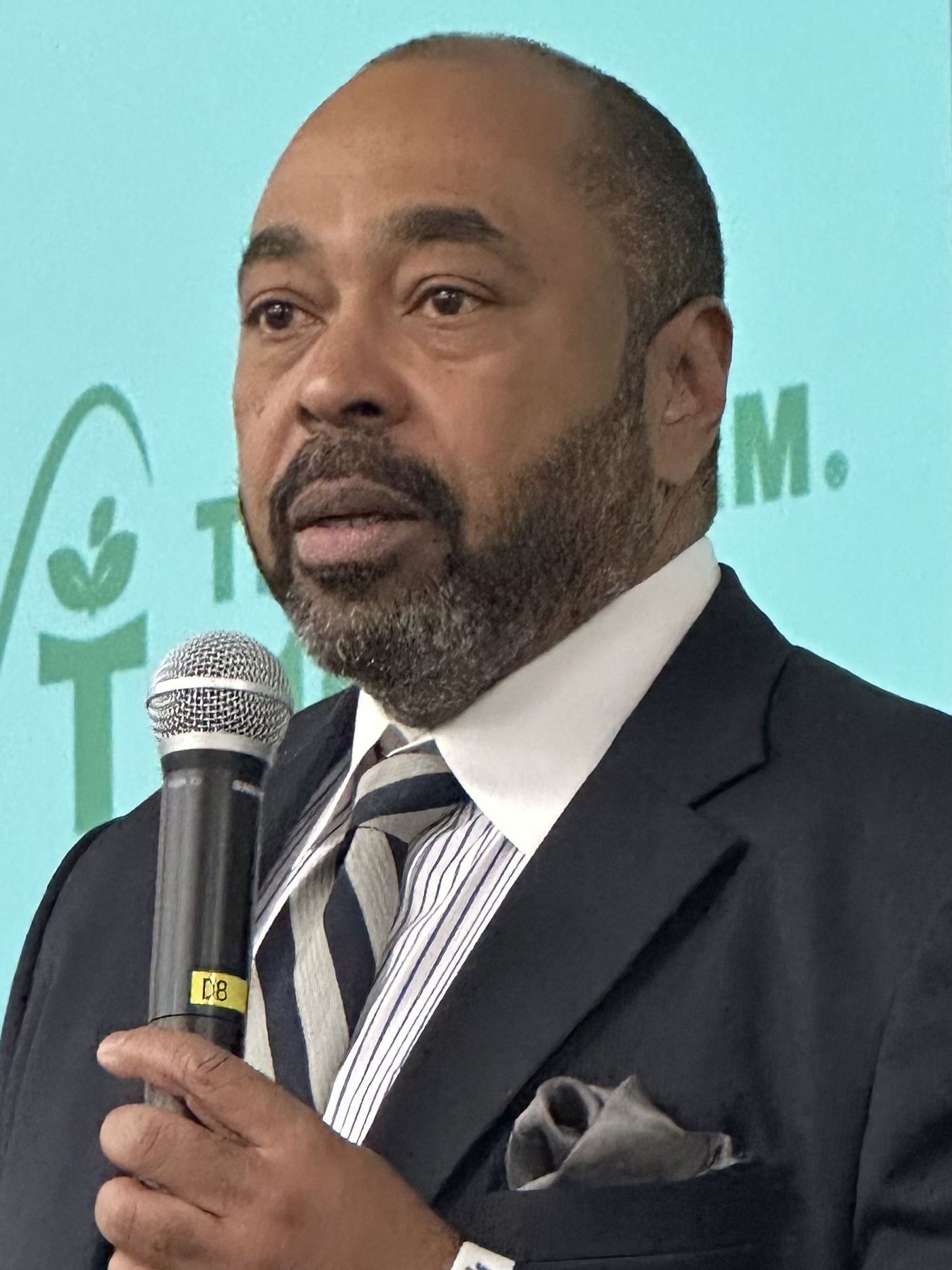

Candidate	Lyda Krewson	Andrew Jones	Larry Rice
Party	Democratic	Republican	Independent
Popular vote	39,375	10,088	6,102
Percentage	67.54%	17.30%	10.47%
- Results by ward Krewson: <50% 50% 55% 60% 65% 70% 75% 80%
Mayor before election
Francis Slay
Democratic
Elected mayor
Lyda Krewson
Democratic

The 2017 St. Louis mayoral election was held on April 4, 2017, to elect the mayor of St. Louis, Missouri. Incumbent Mayor Francis Slay chose not to run for reelection. Slay, who was serving his fourth term as mayor, indicated in March 2016 that he would run for reelection, but announced in April 2016 that he would not run for a fifth term. Primary elections took place on March 7, 2017, and the general election was held on April 4. Alderwoman Lyda Krewson was elected and became the first female Mayor of St. Louis.

== Democratic primary ==
=== Candidates ===
==== Declared ====
- Jeffrey Boyd, Alderman
- Antonio French, Alderman
- Bill Haas, school board member
- Tishaura Jones, City Treasurer and former state representative
- Lyda Krewson, Alderwoman
- Jimmie Matthews
- Lewis E. Reed, president of the board of aldermen and candidate for mayor in 2013

==== Withdrew ====
- Sam Dotson, Commissioner of Police
- Jamilah Nasheed, state senator

==== Declined ====
- Gregory F.X. Daly, Collector of Revenue
- Francis Slay, incumbent mayor
Democratic Party mayoral candidates
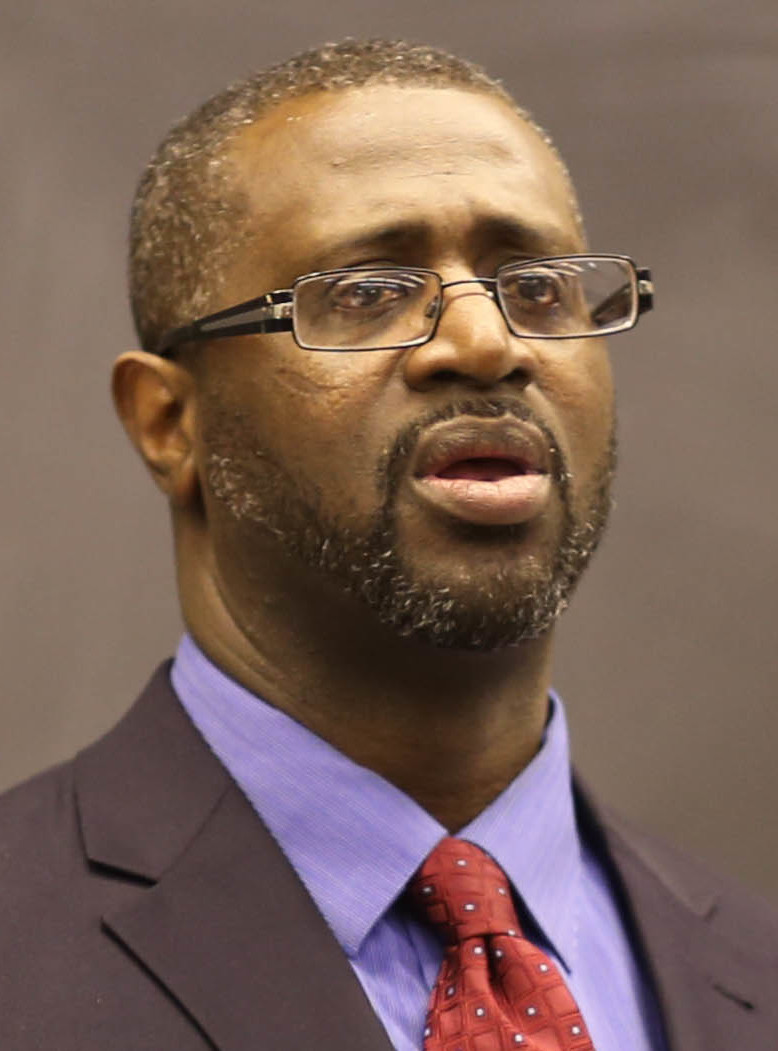
Jeffrey Boyd

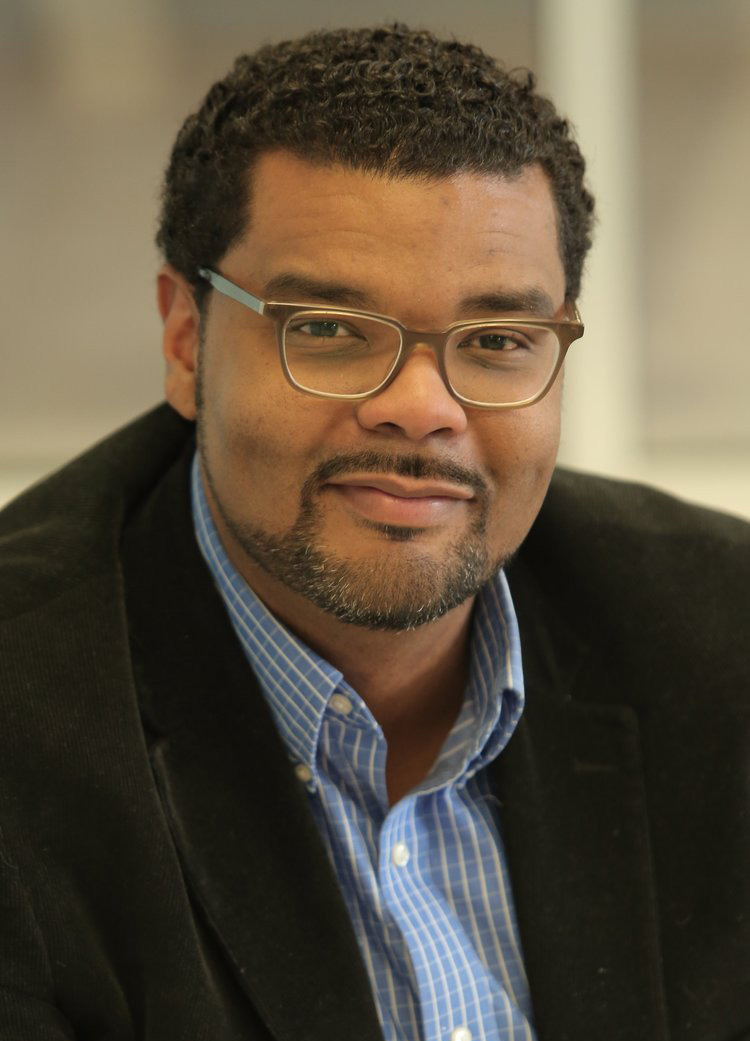
Antonio French

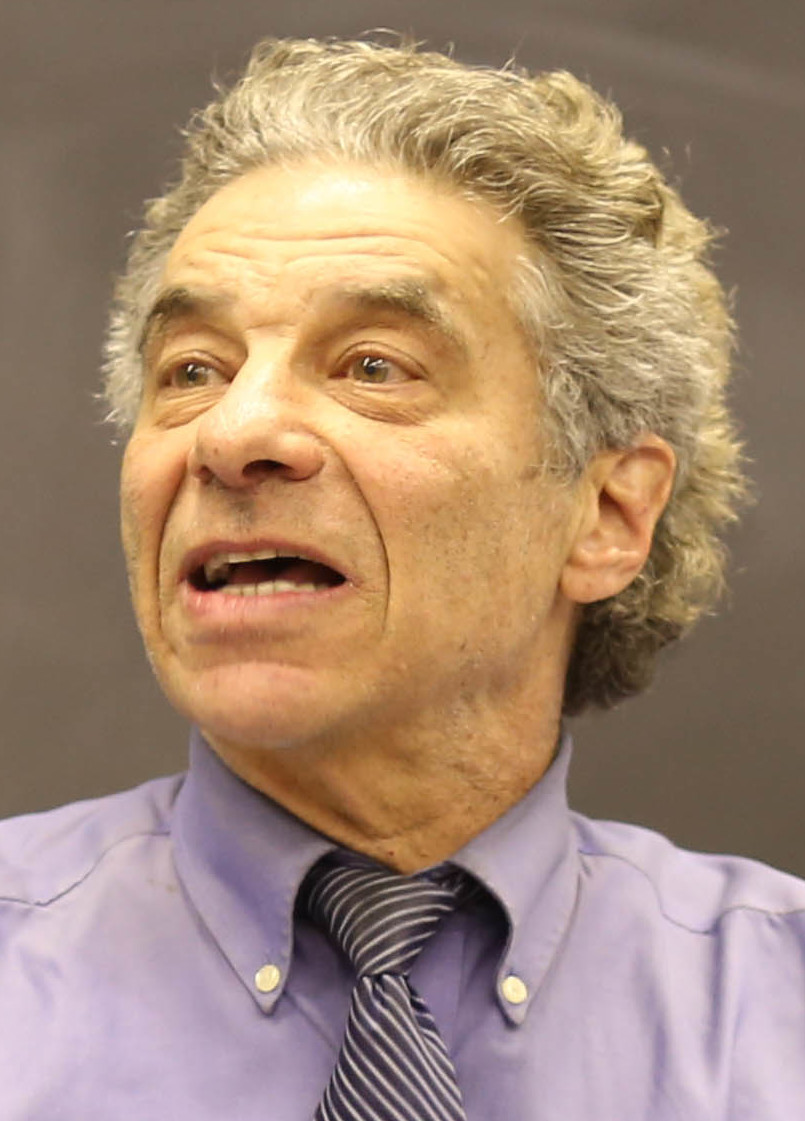
Bill Haas

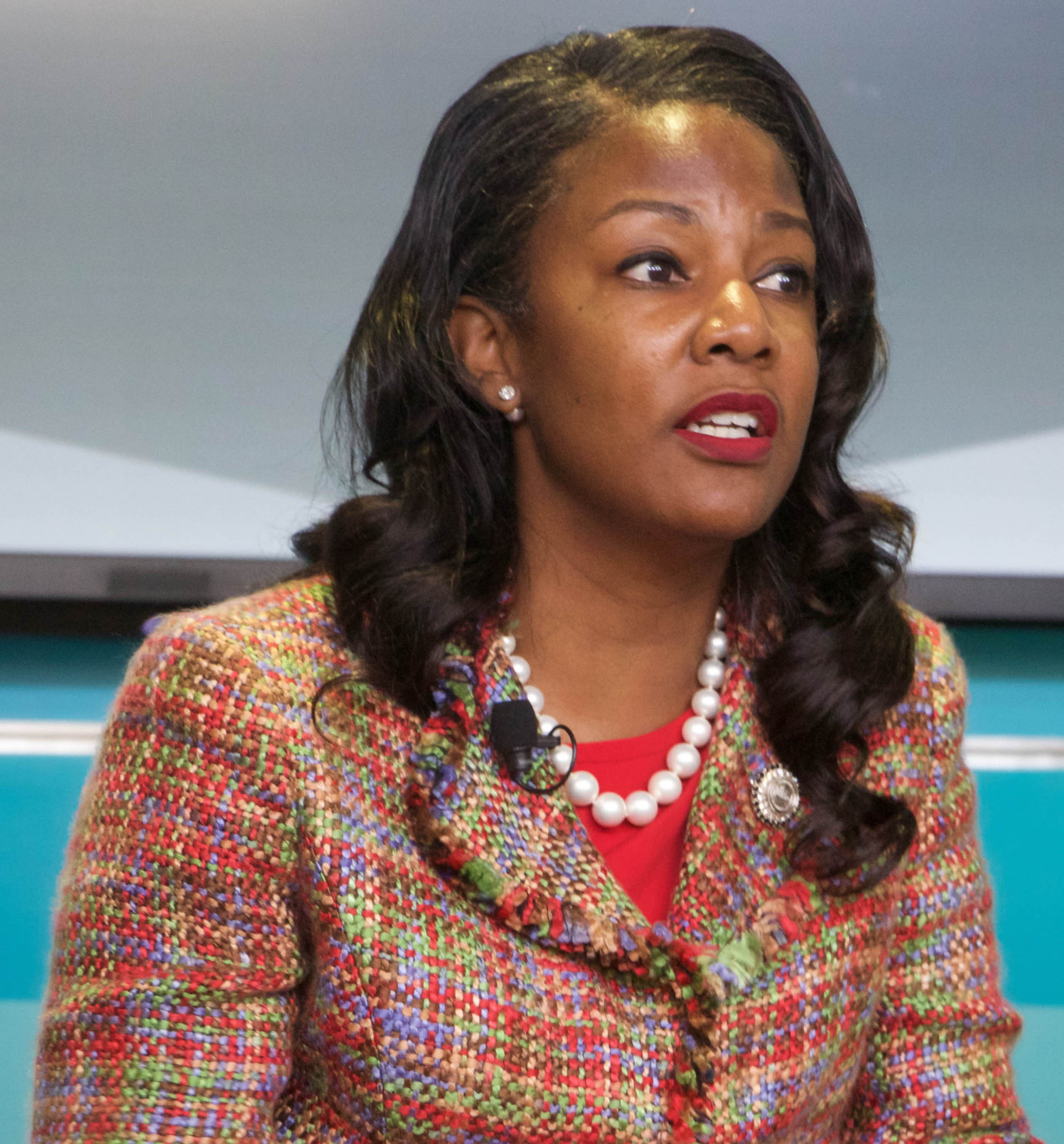
Tishaura Jones

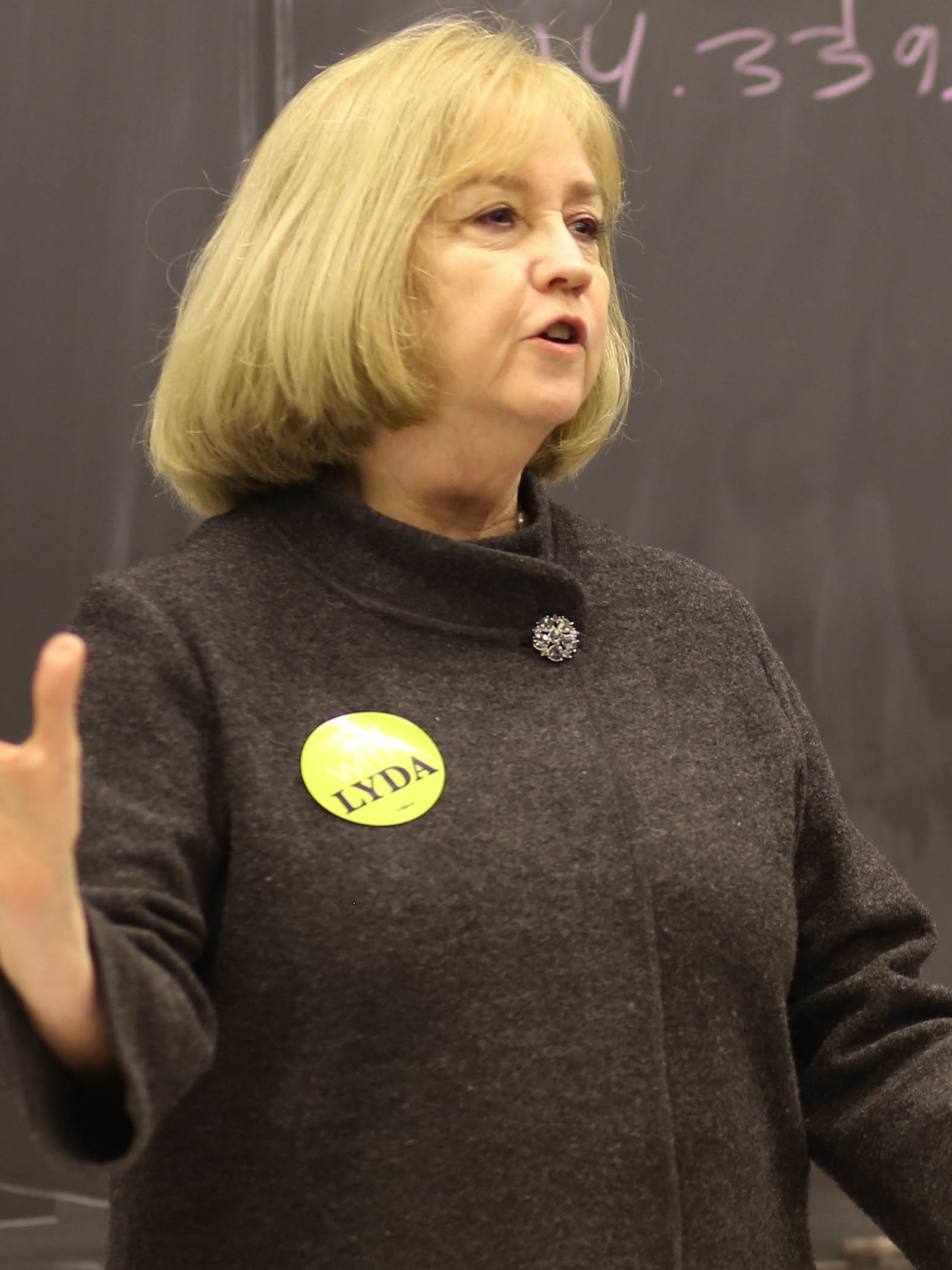
Lyda Krewson

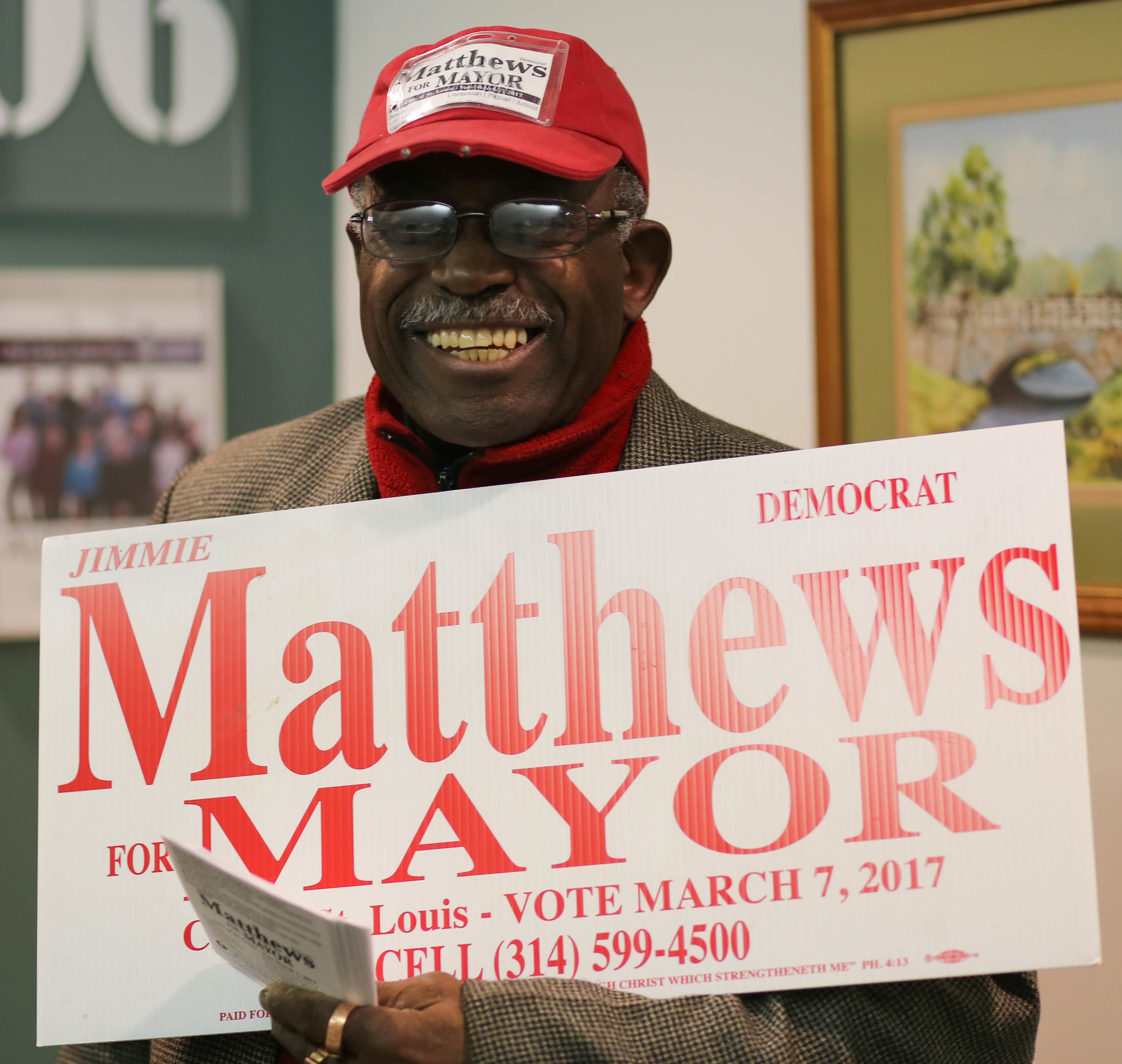
Jimmie Matthews

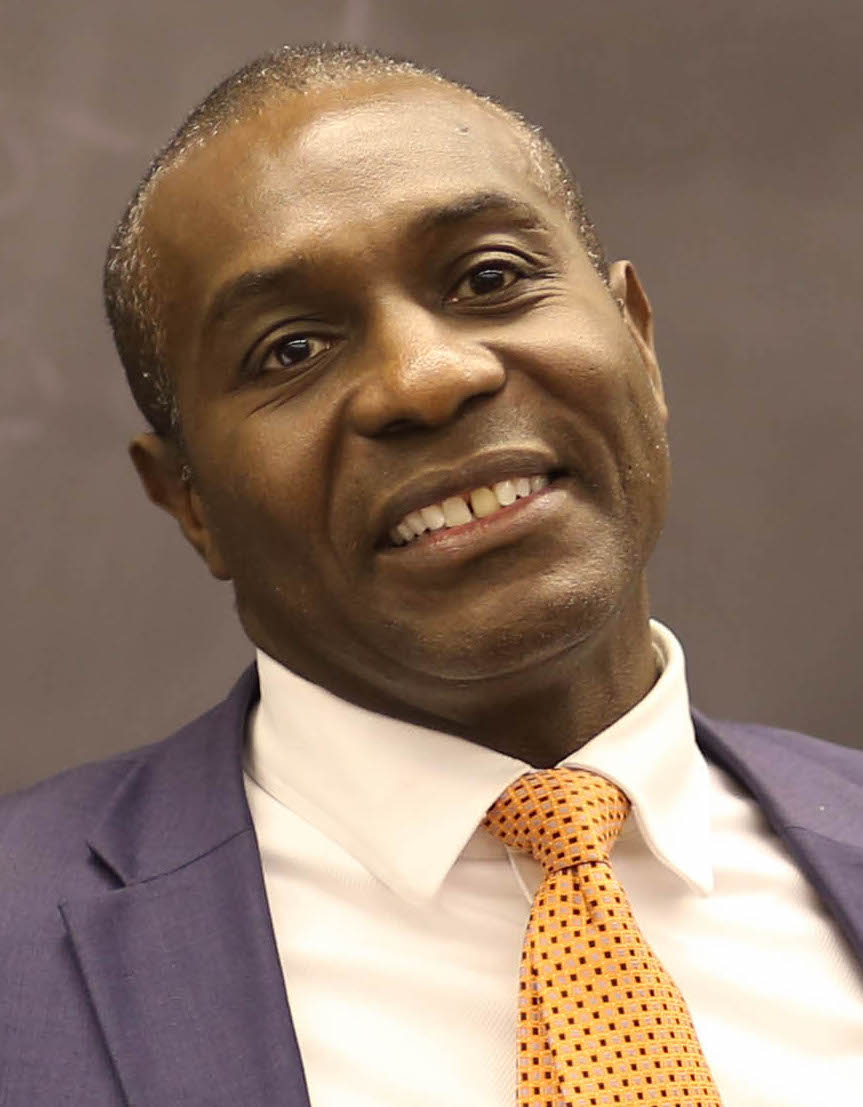
Lewis E. Reed

=== Endorsements ===
Antonio French

Organizations

- The St. Louis Post-Dispatch editorial board
Tishaura Jones

Local officials

- Chris Carter III, member of the St. Louis Board of Aldermen
- Jason Kander, Missouri Secretary of State
- Jamilah Nasheed, Missouri State Senator
- Jake Zimmerman, St. Louis County Assessor

Organizations

- Coalition of Black Trade Unionists
- Democracy for America
- Missourians Organizing for Reform and Empowerment
- MoveOn
- NARAL Pro-Choice America
- Service Employees International Union
- Working Families Party
- Young Democrats of St. Louis
Lyda Krewson

Local officials

- Francis Slay, Mayor of St. Louis

Organizations

- St. Louis Police Officers Association

=== Polling ===
Poll source	Date(s) administered	Sample size	Margin of error	Jeffrey Boyd	Antonio French	Bill Haas	Tishaura Jones	Lyda Krewson	Jimmie Matthews	Lewis E. Reed	Undecided
Remington Research Group	February 14–15, 2017	1,006	± 3%	4%	12%	3%	16%	34%	1%	14%	16%
Remington Research Group	February 7–8, 2017	803	± 3.43%	3%	14%	1%	13%	36%	1%	15%	16%
Remington Research Group	January 24–25, 2017	917	± 3.16%	5%	13%	2%	8%	29%	2%	18%	24%
Remington Research Group	January 17–18, 2017	949	± 3.16%	4%	13%	2%	9%	27%	1%	18%	26%

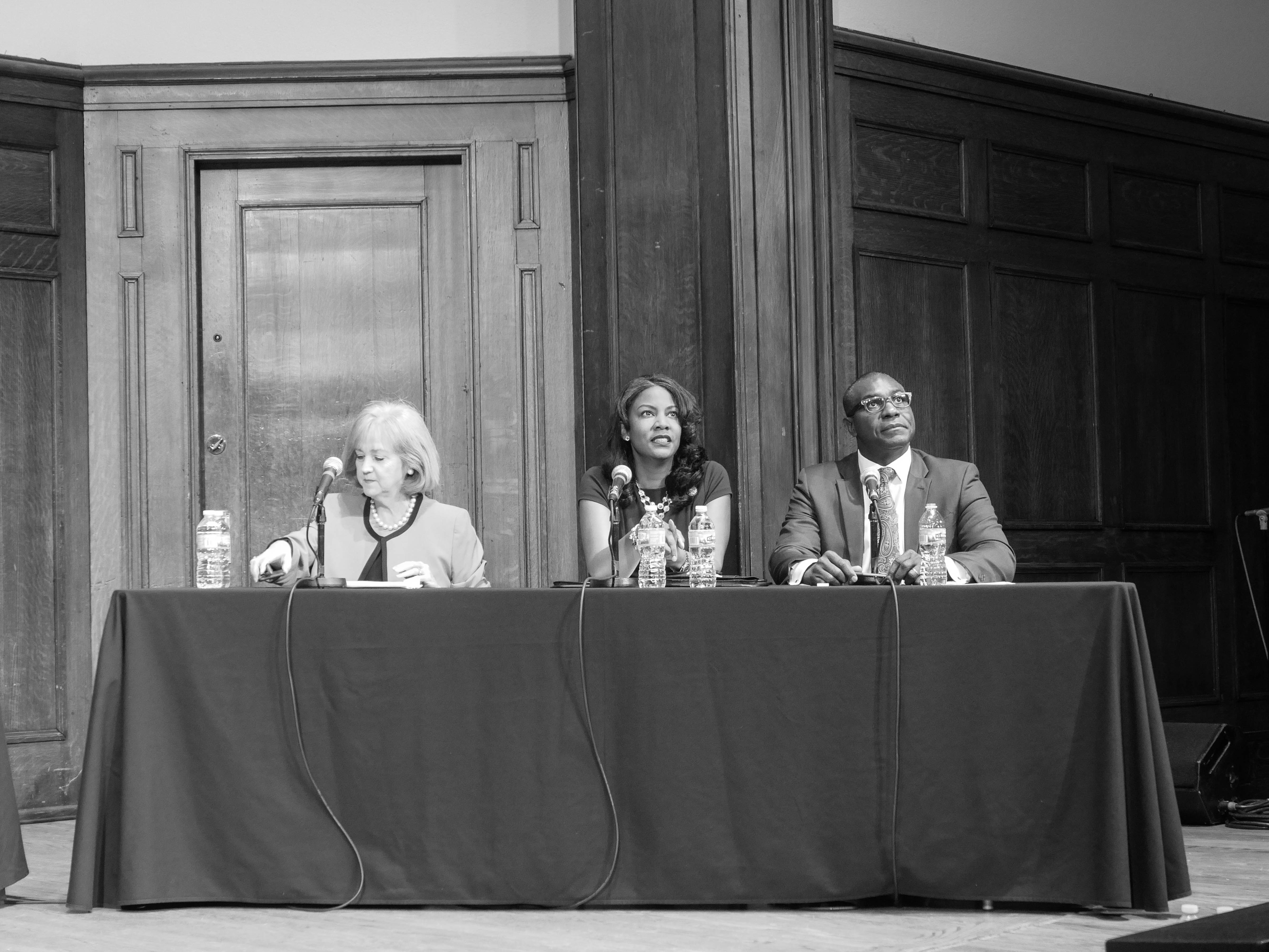
Lyda Krewson (left), Tishaura Jones (center), and Lewis E. Reed (right) at a mayoral forum. Krewson, Jones, and Reed respectively won the most votes.

Democratic primary results
Party	Candidate	Votes	%
Democratic	Lyda Krewson	17,110	32.0
Democratic	Tishaura Jones	16,222	30.4
Democratic	Lewis E. Reed	9,775	18.3
Democratic	Antonio French	8,460	15.8
Democratic	Jeffrey Boyd	1,429	2.7
Democratic	Bill Haas	257	0.5
Democratic	Jimmie Matthews	145	0.3
Total votes		53,398	100

== Republican primary ==
=== Candidates ===
==== Declared ====
- Andrew Jones, utility executive
- Andy Karandzieff, owner of Crown Candy Kitchen
- Jim Osher, building owner

==== Withdrew ====
- Umar Lee, activist

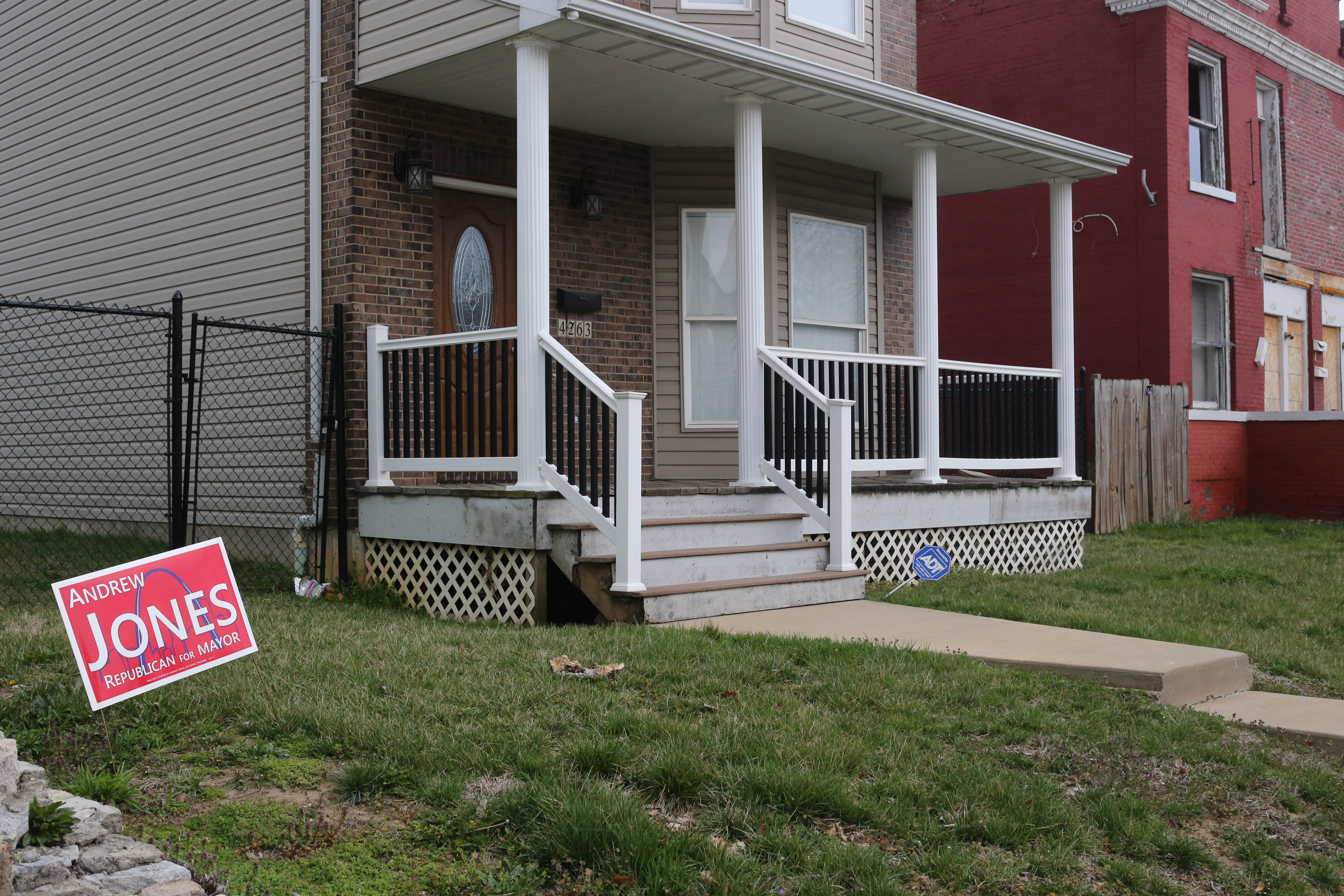
A campaign poster for Andrew Jones's campaign

Republican primary results
Party	Candidate	Votes	%
Republican	Andrew Jones	1,022	61.8
Republican	Andy Karandzieff	399	24.1
Republican	Jim Osher	232	14.0
Total votes		1,653	100

== Libertarian primary ==
- Robb Cunningham, former Congressional candidate

Libertarian primary results
Party	Candidate	Votes	%
Libertarian	Robb Cunningham	57	100
Total votes		57	100

== Green primary ==
- Jonathan McFarland, former U.S. Senate candidate

Green primary results
Party	Candidate	Votes	%
Green	Jonathan McFarland	46	100
Total votes		46	100

== Independent candidates ==
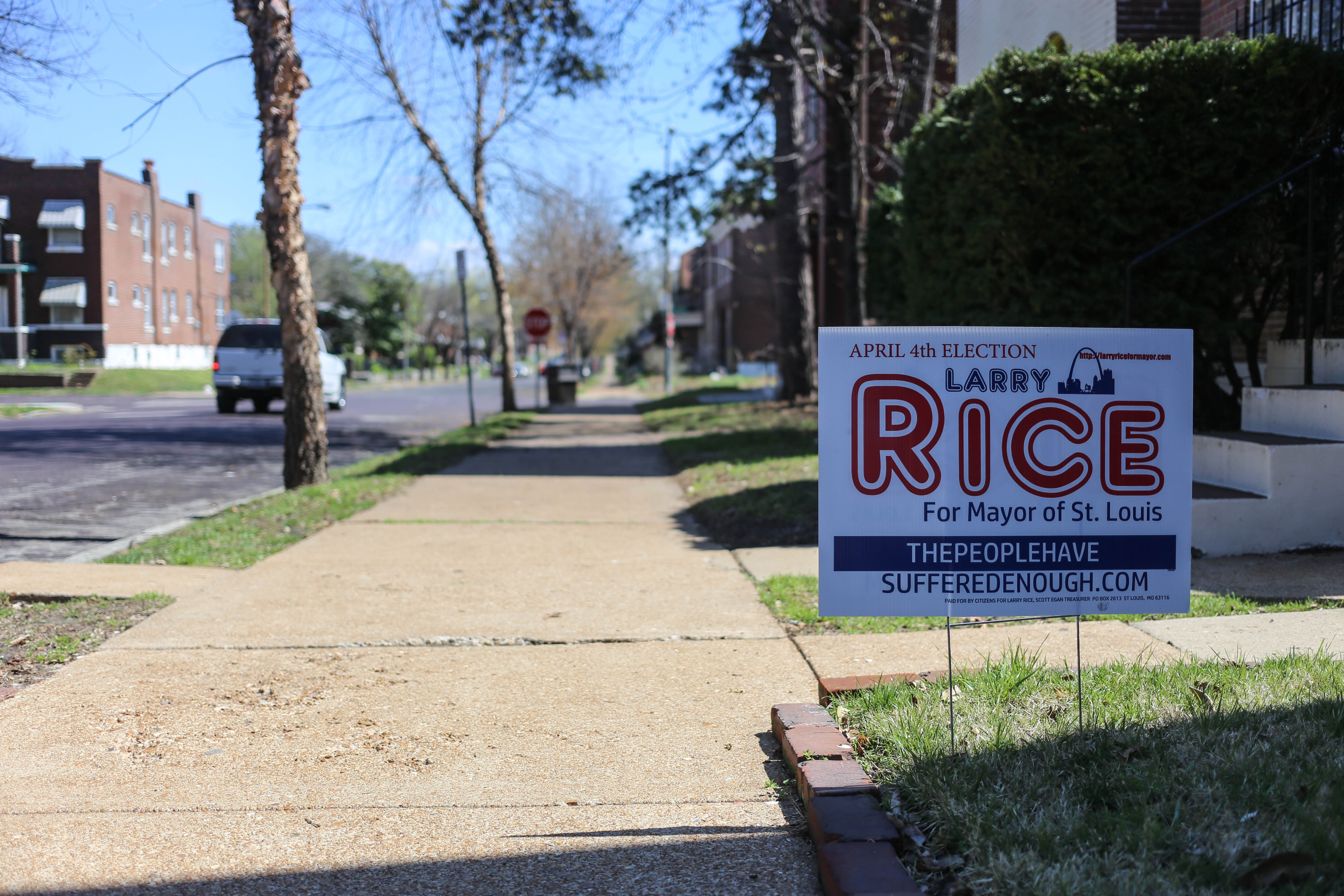
A poster for Rice's independent campaign

- Tyrone Austin, small business owner
- Kacey Cordes
- Rev. Larry Rice, founder of the New Life Evangelistic Center

== Results ==
=== Results ===
St. Louis mayoral election, 2017
Party	Candidate	Votes	%	±%
Democratic	Lyda Krewson	39,375	67.54%	−14.68%
Republican	Andrew Jones	10,088	17.30%	+17.30%
Independent	Larry Rice	6,102	10.47%	N/A
Green	Johnathan McFarland	1,248	2.14%	−13.4%
Libertarian	Robb Cunningham	512	0.88%	+0.88%
Independent	Tyrone Austin	241	0.41%	N/A
N/A	Write-ins	737	1.26%	N/A
Total				58,303
