= Antonio French =

American alderman (born 1977)

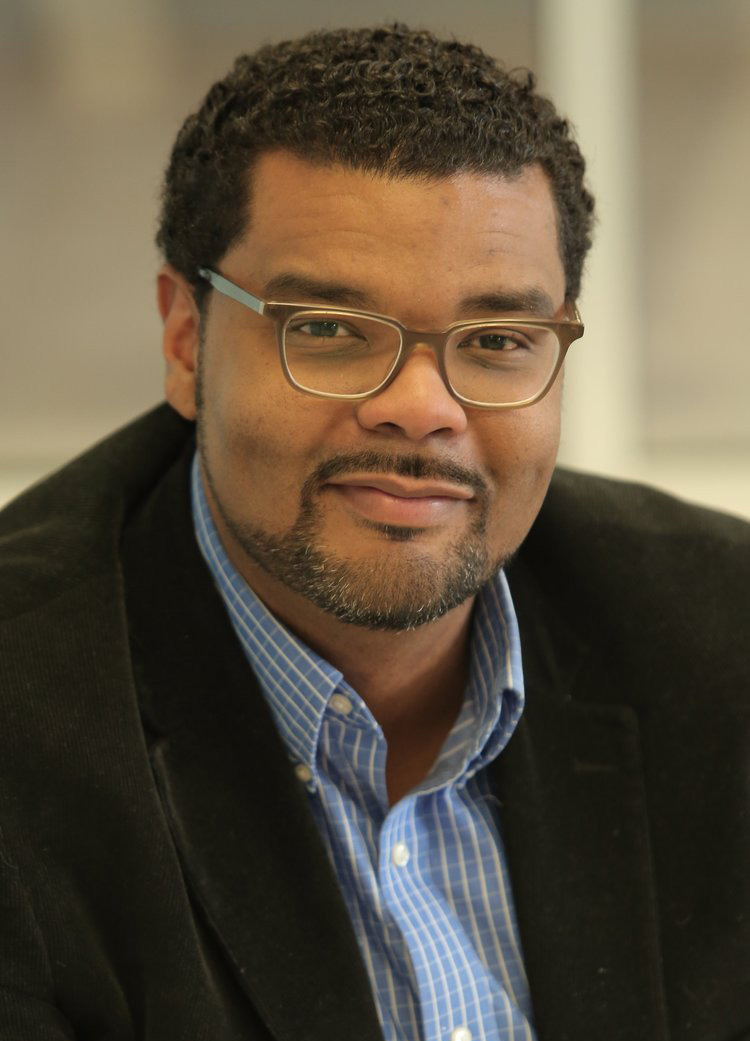
- Born: October 16, 1977 (age 48); St. Louis, Missouri, U.S.
- Education: Washington University in St. Louis; Auburn University
- Occupation: former St. Louis City Alderman
- Spouse: Jasenka Benac French
- Children: 1

Antonio French is a former city alderman in St. Louis, Missouri's 21st Ward.

From 2009 until 2017 French served as the Alderman, representing part of the neighborhoods of Penrose, College Hill, and O'Fallon, where he was born and raised. Prior to becoming Alderman, he served the 21st Ward as the Democratic Committeeman and managed numerous winning political campaigns as the president of his own consulting firm. French also ran a newspaper titled The Public Defender.

== Political career ==
=== Aldermanic first term ===
French's first election, in 2009, gave him the aldermanic seat that he held until the 2017 election, in the Ward in which he grew up. In 2010, he was named "Best Local Politician" by the Riverfront Times. During his first term, He worked to start at $600,000 project to install security cameras all around his ward, which helped cut homicides and general crime in the ward. French also introduced legislation requesting speed bumps in the newly improved O'Fallon Park that was vetoed by Mayor Francis G. Slay.

Other community improvement actions he took during his first term include a "Block by Block" campaign to rehab houses with corporate and non-profit partners each month and a jazz concert series in O'Fallon Park.

=== Aldermanic second term ===
After being re-elected in 2013, Alderman French went on to sponsor a civilian review board bill, in response to the unrest in Ferguson. The bill would create a seven-person board that has the power to review police evidence, interrogation tapes, and investigations, but would not have the power of subpoena. The board would have the power to send investigations back to Internal Affairs with recommendations for further questions or additional evidence. If the board is still unsatisfied, it can conduct its own independent investigation and make recommendations to the police chief regarding discipline. During his second term, French also received his Executive MBA degree from the Olin Business School at Washington University.

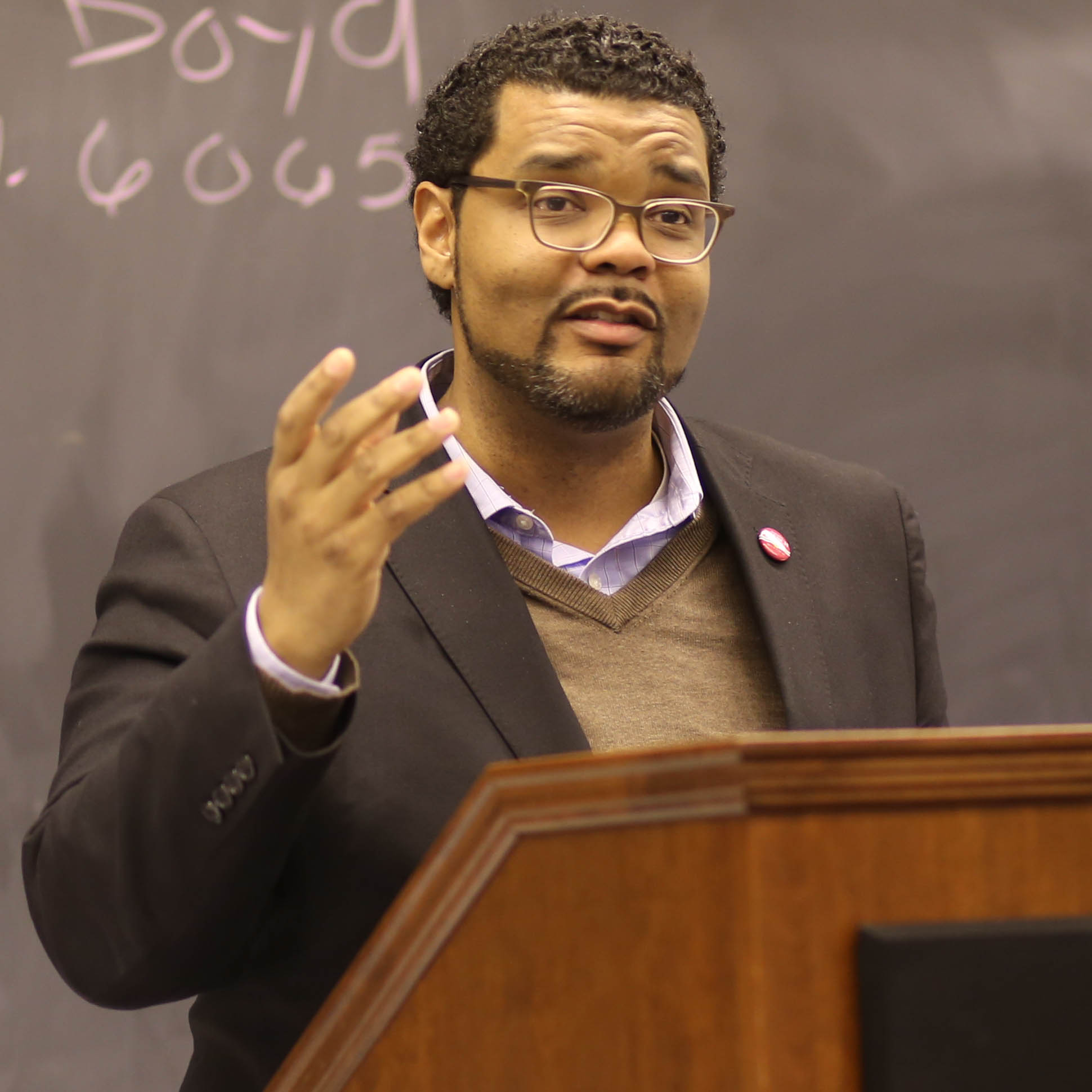
French at a debate during the 2017 St. Louis mayoral election

=== Mayoral election ===
French ran for Mayor of St. Louis in the 2017 election. He was endorsed by the St. Louis Post-Dispatch. He came in fourth out of the seven declared candidates.

== Education initiative ==
In 2012, French founded The North Campus, an education initiative modeled after The Harlem Children’s Zone in New York City. The North Campus provides after-school tutoring, mentoring and enrichment services for more than 150 children. The organization's mission is to coordinate an expansive network of partnerships working together for a common goal: providing the children of the North Campus with a world-class education and an enriching childhood experience so that they will ultimately lift themselves and their families out of poverty. French is both the founder and President of the organization, coordinating multiple sites of student services. In 2015, the IRS stripped North Campus Partnership, an organization created by French, of its nonprofit status for failing to file annual tax returns. The status was subsequently fully reinstated retroactively.

== Ferguson involvement ==
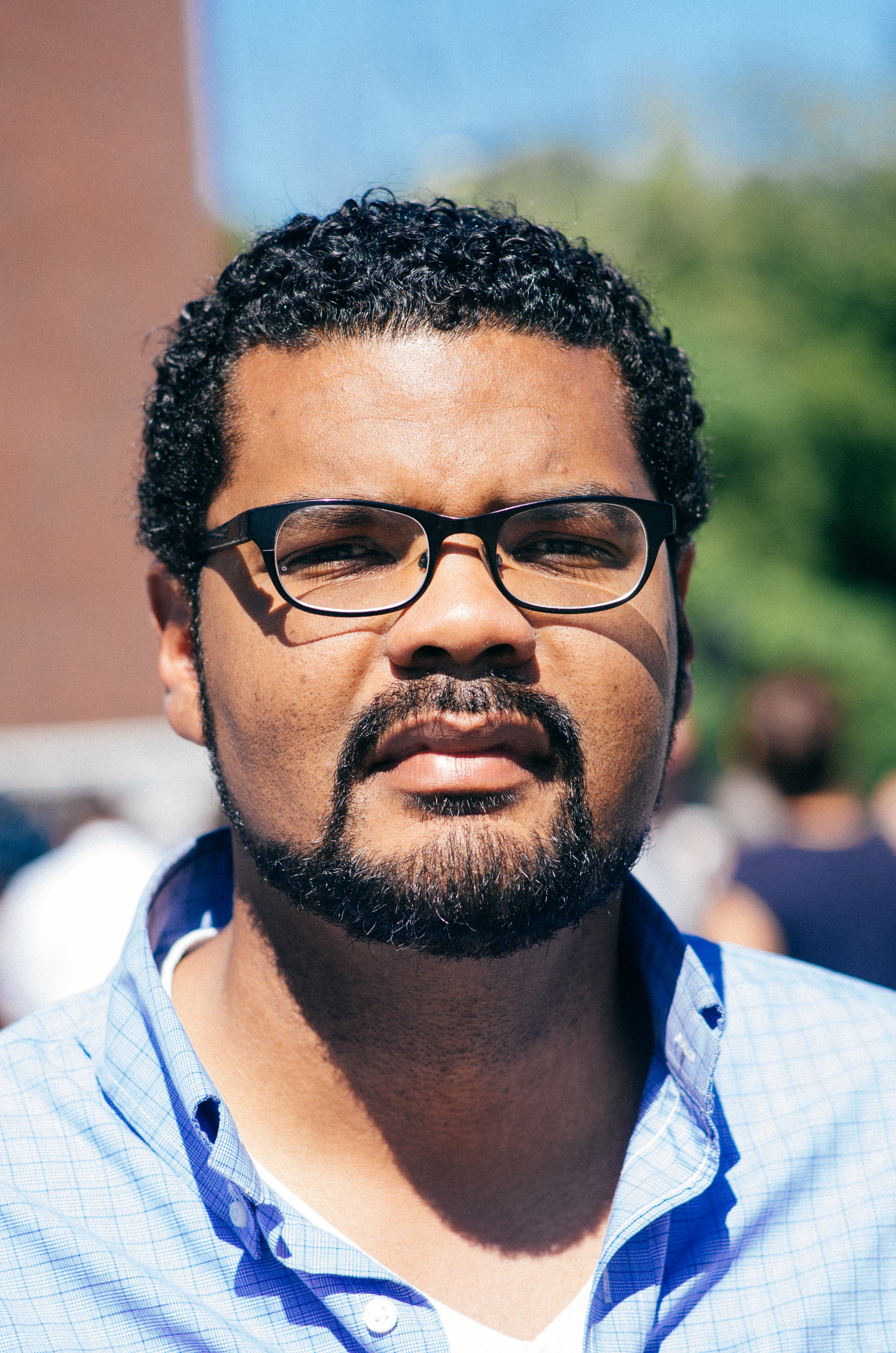
French at the 2014 Ferguson protests

In 2014, French gained national visibility for his role in documenting protests over the shooting of Michael Brown, for which he was arrested. French was among the first of elected officials involved in the Ferguson protests, acting as social media-/photo-journalist and mediator.

== Personal life ==
French's wife, Jasenka, is a Bosnian immigrant who came to the United States with her family as a refugee of the Bosnian War.

Political offices
Preceded by Bennice Jones-King	Alderman of St. Louis's 21st Ward; 2009–2017	Succeeded by John Collins-Muhammad
