= John Wimer =

American politician (1810–1863)

John M. Wimer

7th Mayor of St. Louis, Missouri
- In office 1843–1844
- Preceded by: George Maguire
- Succeeded by: Bernard Pratte
- In office 1857–1858
- Preceded by: John How
- Succeeded by: Oliver Filley

Personal details
- Born: May 8, 1810 Albemarle County, Virginia, US
- Died: January 11, 1863 (aged 52) Hartville, Missouri, US
- Resting place: Bellefontaine Cemetery
- Party: Emancipation Democrat
- Spouse: Abigail S. Wise
- Children: William W. Wimer, John W. Wimer.
- Profession: Mayor, alderman, postmaster, soldier

Military service
- Allegiance: Confederate States of America
- Rank: Lieutenant colonel
- Battles/wars: Battle of Hartville

John M. Wimer (May 8, 1810 – January 11, 1863) served as postmaster, alderman and the seventh person to serve as mayor of St. Louis, Missouri.

== Biography ==
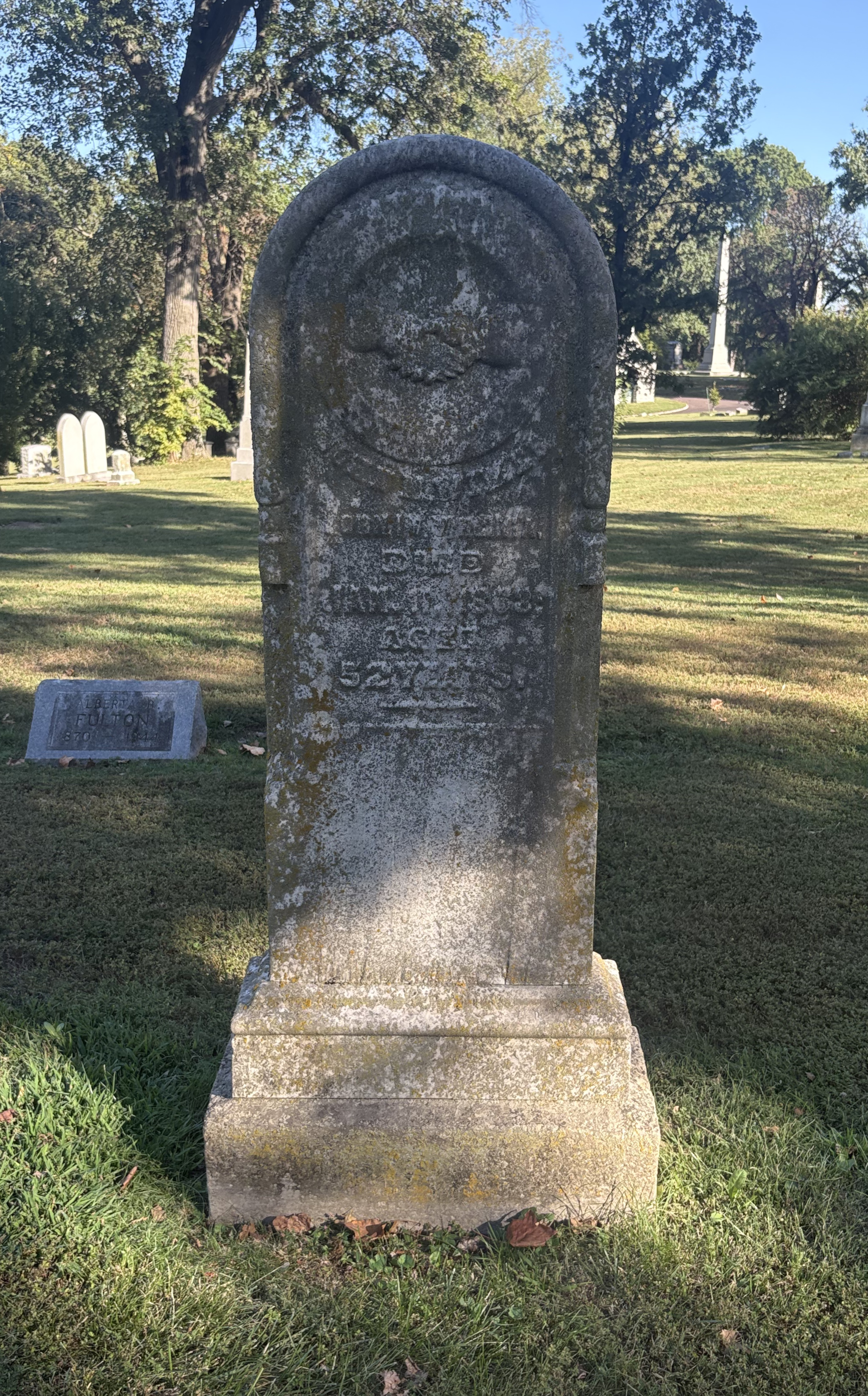
Wimer's grave at Bellefontaine Cemetery

Born in Amherst County, Virginia in 1810, he came west in 1828, initially a blacksmith in St. Louis.

He served two terms as mayor (1843-1844 and 1857–1858), the ninth and nineteenth term served as mayor of St. Louis. Between terms he received his postmaster's appointment on June 14, 1845, after President James K. Polk entered office and just 17 days before the effective date of the 1845 postal reforms, which paved the way for adhesive stamp use by simplifying the rate structure. As Postmaster, John Wimer is known for issuing the "St Louis Bears" a set of provisional postal stamps that are now highly valued as collectibles. Wimer was replaced as postmaster in 1850.

Although he opposed slavery, when the American Civil War broke out, Wimer spoke out strongly for the Confederacy and his native state of Virginia; In 1862 he was arrested and held at Gratiot Street Military Prison and Alton Penitientiary, but Wimer escaped in December 1862 and reached southwest Missouri where he joined the Confederate army under Colonel Emmett MacDonald and Brigadier-General John S. Marmaduke.

He was killed at the Battle of Hartville, in Hartville, Missouri, during which, "Lieutenant-Colonel Wimer was shot dead whilst leading the detachment of Colonel Burbridge's regiment.". It is reported that Wimer was shot through the eye, and after he died that "the yankee Provost Marshal managed to steal his body during the wake, and buried him in an unknown potters field as a final act of desecration. After the war, his body was moved to Bellefontaine Cemetery in St. Louis.

Political offices
| Preceded by George Maguire | Mayor of St. Louis, Missouri; 1843–1844 | Succeeded by Bernard Pratte |
| Preceded by John How | Mayor of St. Louis, Missouri; 1857–1858 | Succeeded by Oliver Filley |
