= Governor Lane =

Governor Lane may refer to:

- Henry S. Lane (1811–1881), 13th Governor of Indiana
- Joseph Lane (1801–1881), Acting Governor of Oregon in 1853
- William Carr Lane (1789–1863), 2nd Governor of New Mexico Territory
- William Preston Lane Jr. (1892–1967), 52nd Governor of Maryland
