= John M. Krum =

American politician (1810–1883)

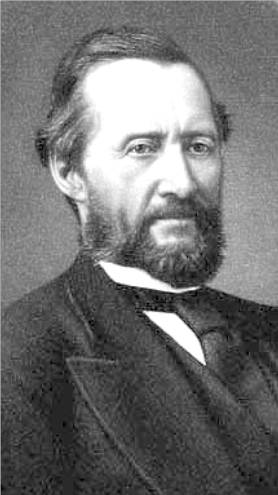

11th Mayor of St. Louis, Missouri
- In office 1848–1849
- Preceded by: Bryan Mullanphy
- Succeeded by: James G. Barry

1st Mayor of Alton, Illinois
- In office 1837–?

Personal details
- Born: John Marshall Krum; March 10, 1810 Hillsdale, New York, US
- Died: September 15, 1883 (aged 73) St. Louis, Missouri, US
- Resting place: Bellefontaine Cemetery
- Party: Democrat (until Civil War); Republican (after Civil War)
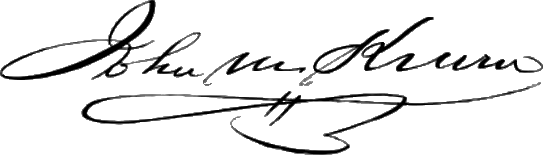
- Signature

John Marshall Krum (March 10, 1810 – September 15, 1883) was an American lawyer, jurist, and politician. He served as the 11th mayor of St. Louis, as well as the first mayor of Alton, Illinois. In 1860, he was the chairman of the Credentials Committee at the Democratic National Convention held in Charleston, South Carolina.

== Early life and education ==
John Marshall Krum was born on March 10, 1810, in Hillsdale, New York, to Sarah Trowbridge and Peter Krum. Peter came to America with his father Henry about 1760.

Krum attended Smith Academy in Albany and Fairfield Academy in New York City. In 1829, he attended Union College for one year, but had to quit due to an ailment of his eye. He was a teacher at Kingston, New York and he studied law. In 1833, he was admitted to the bar.

== Career ==
Krum moved to St. Louis in November 1833 and was admitted to the state bar in January 1834. He then moved to Alton, Illinois, practicing law there while also retaining his law office in St. Louis. He was appointed probate judge for Madison County, Illinois, in December 1835. Alton was incorporated in 1837 and he became the town's first mayor during which Elijah Parish Lovejoy was killed by a pro-slavery mob. The following year he became state senator. In 1840, the Krums moved to St. Louis, where he was a successful lawyer, specializing in land cases. (Note: Conrad stated that they moved to St. Louis in 1842.) He became the Judge of the St. Louis Circuit Court in 1844. (Note: A newspaper from 1844 said that he was appointed as a judge of the Circuit Court. An obituary from 1883 stated that he became a judge of the Circuit Court in 1843.) In 1848, he resigned from his judicial position and became the first Democrat mayor of St. Louis.

He was an active participant in creating the public school system as mayor and a member of the Board of Education for ten years. From 1855 until his death, he was the chairman and a member of the Education Committee at Washington University in St. Louis.

In 1860, he was the chairman of the Credentials Committee at the Democratic National Convention held in Charleston, South Carolina. The same year, he canvassed for Stephen A. Douglas in Missouri, Illinois, and New York.

After the American Civil War began, Krum left the Democratic Party and became a Republican. He supported the Union during the Civil War. In 1862, he was appointed Colonel of the 9th Military Militia, a local enrolled militia regiment, and remained Colonel until the end of the war.

Krum was a member, and president for several terms, of the Missouri State Bar Association. He operated his law practice in St. Louis until his death.

== Personal life and death ==
Krum married Mary Ophelia Harding, daughter of artist Chester Harding in October 1839. They had four children, two of whom were Chester Harding Krum and Margaret Krum, who married Edwin A. DeWolf.

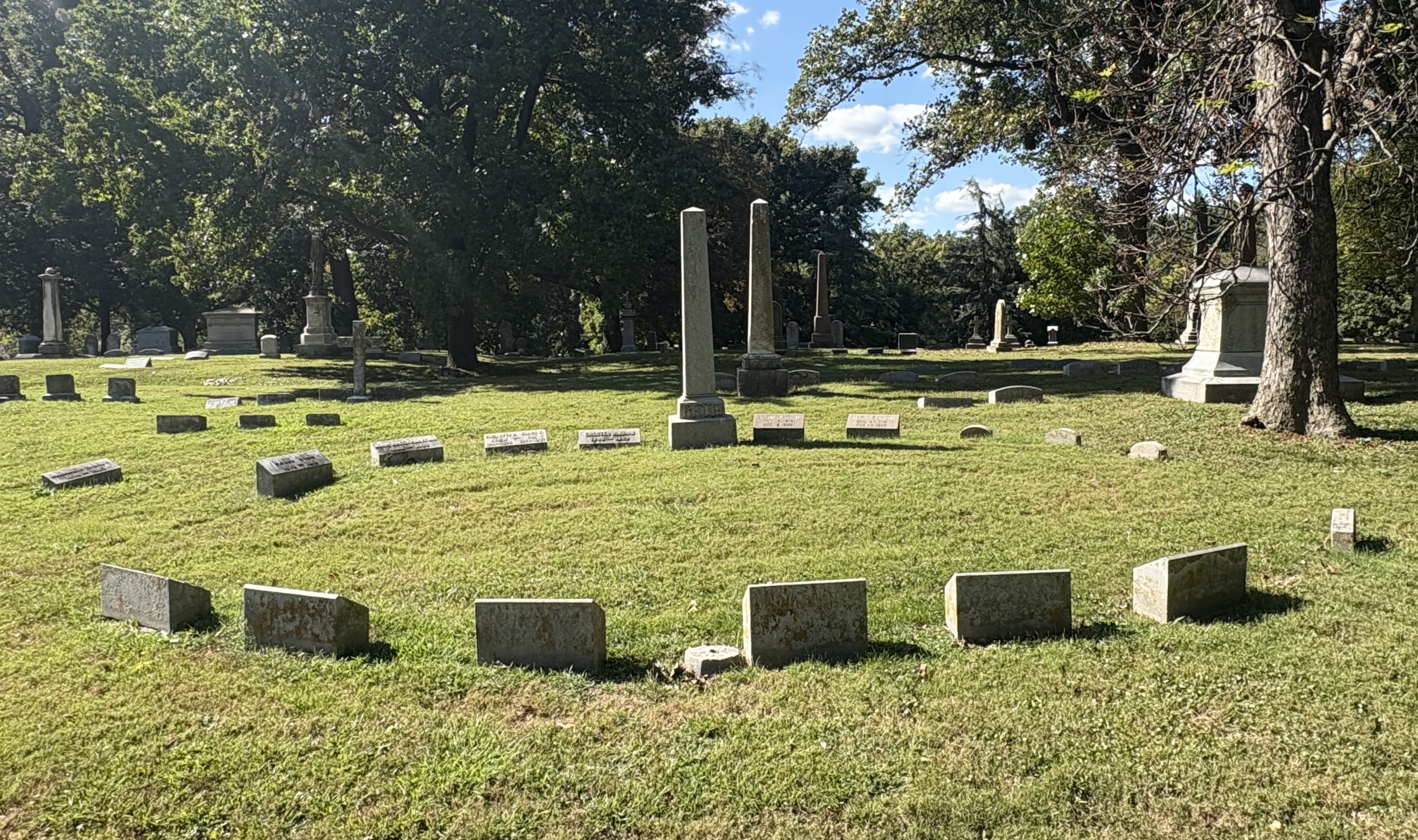
Krum plot at Bellefontaine Cemetery. John's stone is to the right of the upright family marker.

Krum died of pneumonia at his residence in St. Louis on September 15, 1883, aged 73. (Note: Missouri death records and contemporary newspapers state that he died on September 15, 1883. Other sources state that he died on September 13, 1883.) He was interred at the Bellefontaine Cemetery in St. Louis.

== Notes ==
Political offices
Preceded by Bryan Mullanphy	Mayor of St. Louis, Missouri; 1848–1849	Succeeded by James G. Barry
New title	Mayor of Alton, Illinois; 1837 – tbc	Succeeded by
