= George Maguire =

George Maguire may refer to:

- George Maguire (actor, born 1985), English actor and musician
- George Maguire (actor, born 1990), English actor
- George Maguire (politician) (1796–1882), Irish-American politician
- George Maguire (ice hockey) (born 1922), general manager of the Los Angeles Kings
