= John Fletcher Darby =

American politician (1803–1882)

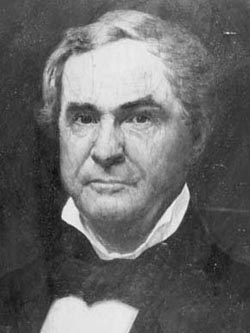

4th Mayor of St. Louis
- In office April 14, 1835 – October 31, 1837
- Preceded by: John W. Johnston
- Succeeded by: William Carr Lane
- In office April 14, 1840 – April 13, 1841
- Preceded by: William Carr Lane
- Succeeded by: John D. Daggett

Member of the U.S. House of Representatives from Missouri's 1st district
- In office March 4, 1851 – March 3, 1853
- Preceded by: James B. Bowlin
- Succeeded by: Thomas Hart Benton

Member of the Missouri Senate
- In office 1838

Personal details
- Born: December 10, 1803 Person County, North Carolina, US
- Died: May 11, 1882 (aged 78) Pendleton, Missouri, US
- Resting place: Calvary Cemetery
- Party: Whig

John Fletcher Darby (December 10, 1803 – May 11, 1882) was an American politician. A Whig, he was the Mayor of St. Louis and a member of the United States House of Representatives from Missouri.

== Biography ==
Darby was born on December 10, 1803, in Person County, North Carolina, the son of planter John Darby. He was educated at local public schools, and in 1818, moved to Missouri with his parents, where he was a farmer, likely in Warren County. He studied Latin from a young age. Both his parents died in early 1823. In 1825, he moved to Frankfort, Kentucky to read law under John J. Crittenden, being admitted to the bar, and in 1827, began practicing law in St. Louis. He owned slaves.

Darby was a Whig. In 1834, he was elected to the St. Louis Board of Aldermen. He served as Mayor of St. Louis from April 14, 1835, until his resignation on October 31, 1837; he served again, from April 14, 1840, to April 13, 1841. As mayor, he had the city's first two public parks established, and pushed for railroads to be built through the city and deprivatized the waterworks. In 1838 and 1839, he was a member of the Missouri Senate, representing the 19th district, and during his tenure had the St. Louis, Iron Mountain and Southern Railway chartered. He was a member of the United States House of Representatives from March 4, 1851, to March 3, 1853, representing Missouri's 1st district. While in Congress, he primarily worked with railroad legislation.

After serving in Congress, Darby became a banker in St. Louis. He was a founder of the St. Louis Law Library Association. In 1836, he married Mary M. Wilkinson. He died on May 11, 1882, aged 78, in Pendleton, and was buried at Calvary Cemetery.

Political offices
Preceded by John W. Johnson	Mayor of St. Louis, Missouri; 1835–1837	Succeeded by William Carr Lane
Preceded by William Carr Lane	Mayor of St. Louis, Missouri; 1840–1841	Succeeded by John D. Daggett
U.S. House of Representatives
Preceded by James B. Bowlin	Member from Missouri's 1st congressional district 1851–1853	Succeeded by Thomas Hart Benton
