= John D. Daggett =

American politician

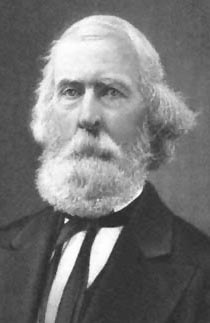

5th Mayor of St. Louis, Missouri
- In office 1841–1842
- Preceded by: John Fletcher Darby
- Succeeded by: George Maguire

Personal details
- Born: October 4, 1793 Attleboro, Massachusetts, US
- Died: May 10, 1874 (aged 80) St. Louis, Missouri, US
- Party: Whig

John D. Daggett (October 4, 1793 – May 10, 1874) was the fifth mayor of St. Louis, Missouri.

He was born on October 4, 1793, in Attleboro, Massachusetts. A lock maker, he arrived in St Louis in 1817. He married Sarah Sparks in 1821.

Daggett was elected to the Board of Alderman of St Louis in 1827, and became Street Commissioner in 1838. He was one of the founders of the Gas Light Company in 1839, and became its president in 1842.

He served as Mayor of St Louis from 1841 to 1842, as a member of the Whig party.

After his term as Mayor, he was Secretary of the St Louis Board of Public Schools, and in 1849 he became manager of the Sectional Dock Company.

He died on May 10, 1874, in St. Louis, and is buried in Bellefontaine Cemetery.

Political offices
Preceded by John Fletcher Darby	Mayor of St. Louis, Missouri; 1841–1842	Succeeded by George Maguire
