= Luther Martin Kennett =

American politician and businessman (1807–1873)

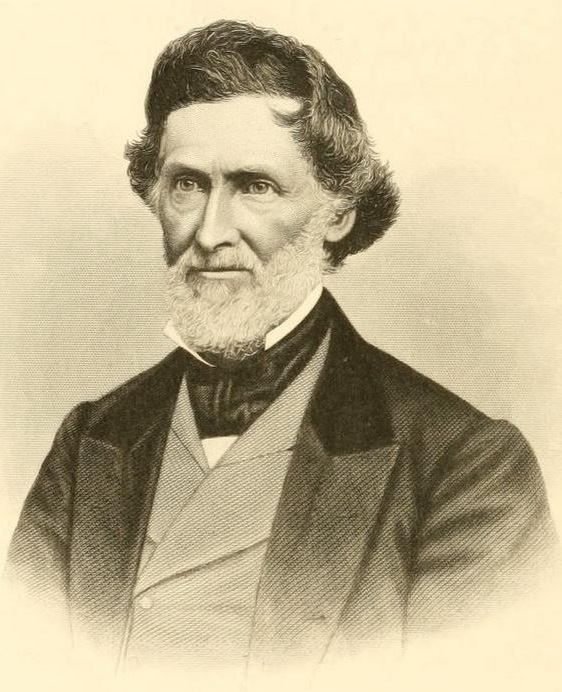

Member of the U.S. House of Representatives from Missouri's 1st district
- In office March 4, 1855 – March 3, 1857
- Preceded by: Thomas Hart Benton
- Succeeded by: Francis Preston Blair Jr.

Mayor of St. Louis
- In office 1850–1853
- Preceded by: James G. Barry
- Succeeded by: John How

Personal details
- Born: March 15, 1807 Falmouth, Kentucky, US
- Died: April 12, 1873 (aged 66) Paris, France
- Party: Whig
- Occupation: Politician, businessman

Luther Martin Kennett (March 15, 1807 – April 12, 1873) was an American politician and businessman. A member of the Whig Party, he was a member of the United States House of Representatives from Missouri, as well as Mayor of St. Louis.

== Biography ==
Kennett was born on March 15, 1807, in Falmouth, Kentucky, the son of Press Graves Kennett and Margaret (née Porter) Kennett. He was presumably named for priest Martin Luther. He was educated at private schools. In 1822 and 1823, he was Pendleton County's deputy county clerk, and of Campbell County in 1824. Also in 1824, he moved to St. Louis, where he worked as a merchant beginning in 1825. He then moved between Jefferson and St. Francois Counties, where he worked in the mining and shot manufacturing industries. He owned slaves.

Between some point and 1849, Kennett moved to Europe due to illness, after which he returned to St. Louis. He then became vice-president of the Pacific Railroad. From 1850 to 1853, he was Mayor of St. Louis. Later in 1853, he became president of the St. Louis, Iron Mountain and Southern Railway.

Kennett was a Whig. He was a member of the St. Louis Board of Aldermen from 1843 to 1846, refusing to run for re-election. He was elected to the United States House of Representatives as a member of the Whig Party. He served from March 4, 1855, to March 3, 1857, representing Missouri's 1st district. He lost the following election.

In 1857, Kennett retired to his home near St. Louis. In 1867, he moved to Europe. He died on April 12, 1873, aged 66, in Paris. His remains arrived at St. Louis on May 4, after which he was buried at Bellefontaine Cemetery. The city Kennett, Missouri, is named after him. He married Mary Ann Eliza Boyce; their granddaughter, Martha Swearingen Farrar, married politician Daniel D. Burnes.

Political offices
Preceded by James G. Barry	Mayor of St. Louis, Missouri; 1850–1853	Succeeded by John How
U.S. House of Representatives
Preceded by Thomas Hart Benton	Member from Missouri's 1st congressional district 1855–1857	Succeeded by Francis Preston Blair Jr.
