= 1989 St. Louis mayoral election =

- April 4, 1989
- Turnout: 14.8%
Candidate	Vincent C. Schoemehl	Bernard Elking
Party	Democratic	Republican
Popular vote	48,821	17,512
Percentage	72.83%	26.12%
Mayor before election
Vincent C. Schoemehl
Democratic
Elected mayor
Vincent C. Schoemehl
Democratic

The 1989 St. Louis mayoral election was held on April 4, 1989 to elect the mayor of St. Louis, Missouri. It saw the re-election of Vincent C. Schoemehl to a third term.

The election was preceded by party primaries on March 7.

== Democratic primary ==
Democratic primary results
Party	Candidate	Votes	%
Democratic	Vincent C. Schoemehl (incumbent)	36,743	61.54
Democratic	Michael V. Roberts	20,581	34.47
Democratic	John Noel	2,382	3.99
Turnout		59,706	13.19

== General election ==
General election result
Party	Candidate	Votes	%
Democratic	Vincent C. Schoemehl (incumbent)	48,821	72.83
Republican	Bernard Elking	17,512	26.12
Independent	Ron Gregory	466	0.7
Independent	Dennis Lang	205	0.31
Independent	Tom Leonard	18	0.03
Independent	Ted Brown Sr.	13	0.02
Turnout		67,035	14.8
