= 1985 St. Louis mayoral election =

- April 2, 1985
- Turnout: 16.24%
Candidate	Vincent C. Schoemehl	Curtis Crawford
Party	Democratic	Republican
Popular vote	62,583	10,937
Percentage	85.12%	14.88%
Mayor before election
Vincent C. Schoemehl
Democratic
Elected mayor
Vincent C. Schoemehl
Democratic

The 1985 St. Louis mayoral election was held on April 2, 1985 to elect the mayor of St. Louis, Missouri. It saw the re-election of Vincent C. Schoemehl to a second term.

The election was preceded by party primaries on March 5.

== Democratic primary ==
Democratic primary results
Party	Candidate	Votes	%
Democratic	Vincent C. Schoemehl (incumbent)	61,161	72.6
Democratic	Freeman Bosley Sr.	18,836	22.36
Democratic	Eugene Camp	1,893	2.25
Democratic	David Kinealy	1,728	2.05
Democratic	Fred Williams	631	0.75
Turnout		84,249	18.61

== General election ==
General election result
Party	Candidate	Votes	%
Democratic	Vincent C. Schoemehl (incumbent)	62,583	84.15
Republican	Curtis Crawford	10,937	14.71
Socialist Workers	Bruce Kimball	849	1.14
Turnout		74,369	100.00
