= John Mullanphy =

American merchant and philanthropist

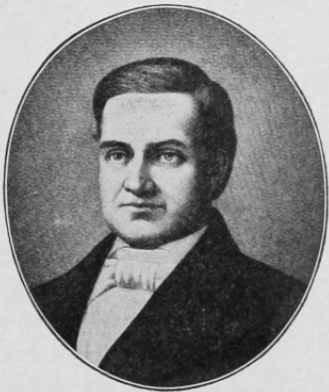
- Born: 1758; Enniskillen, County Fermanagh
- Died: August 29, 1833 (aged 74–75); St. Louis, Missouri
- Burial place: Calvary Cemetery
- Occupation: Merchant

John Mullanphy (1758 – August 29, 1833) was an Irish immigrant to the United States who became a wealthy merchant in St. Louis and in Baltimore. He arrived in Philadelphia with his wife and child in 1792. He moved to the French frontier village of St. Louis in 1804. The village had 180 log and stone houses and fewer than 1,000 inhabitants when he arrived. The stone houses were mostly owned by the wealthy French fur traders.

== Biography ==
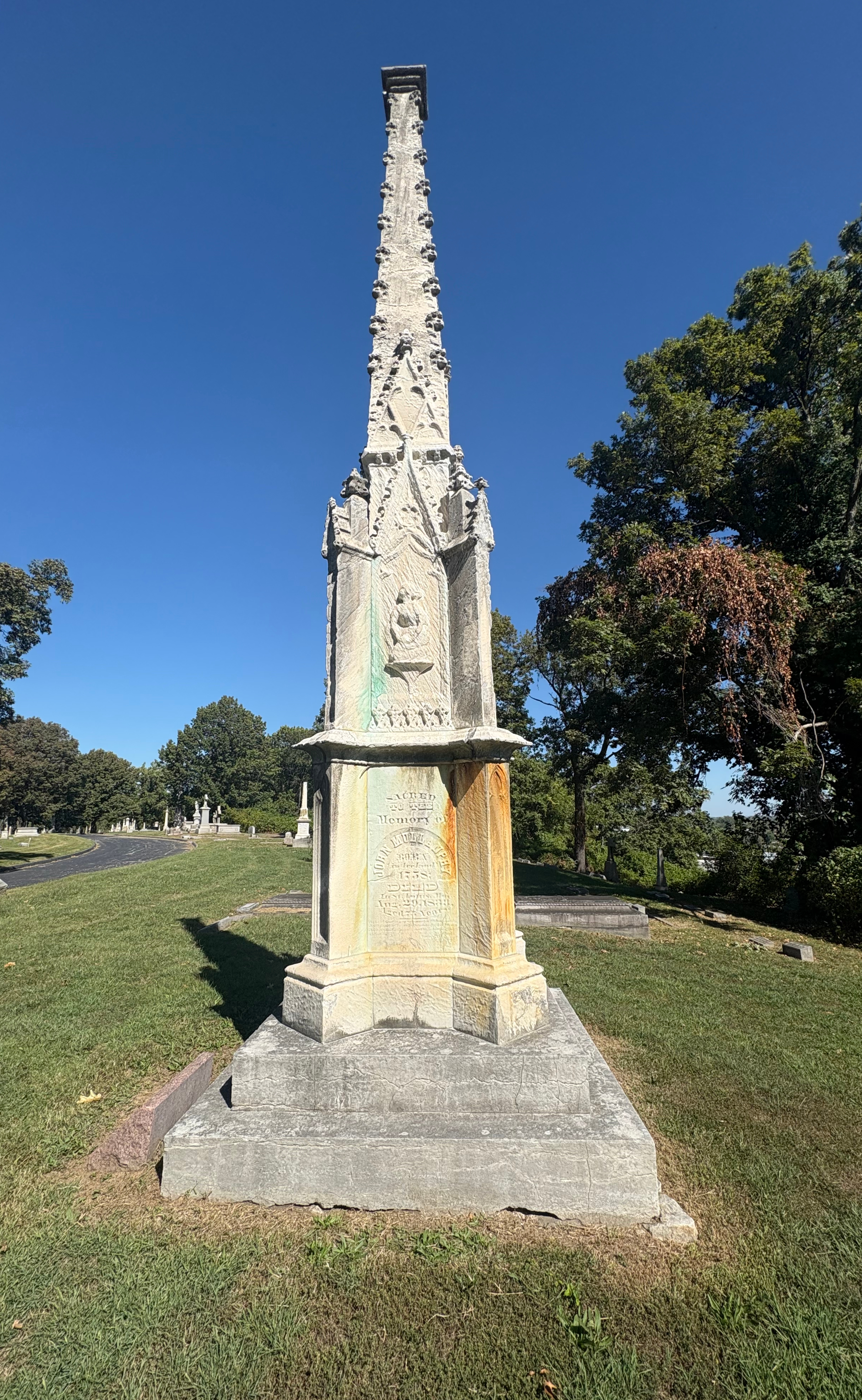
Mullanphy's grave at Calvary Cemetery

John Mullanphy was born near Enniskillen, County Fermanagh around the year 1758. Raised by his uncle Bryan Mullanphy after his father's second marriage, at age twenty he joined the Irish Brigade of the French Army as an ensign. The brigade dispersed after the execution of Louis XVI, and Mullanphy returned to Ireland. In 1789, he married sixteen-year-old Elizabeth Browne of Youghal, County Waterford. He and his wife along with their first child, Ellen, sailed for Philadelphia arriving in 1792 where they remained for one year, and then moved to Baltimore for five years. While in Baltimore Mullanphy became a friend of John Carroll, the first Catholic bishop in America. The Mullanphy family next moved to Frankfort, Kentucky in 1798 where John opened a bookstore and general merchandise store. In 1802 he built a sailing brig on the Kentucky River at Frankfort, loaded it with produce and sent it to the West Indies under the command of a Captain Watson from Philadelphia. It made several successful trips until it was lost in a gale in 1803 or 1804. While in Frankfort Mullanphy became friends with Charles Gratiot, a merchant and fur trader who suggested Mullanphy move his family to the French frontier village of St. Louis, which he did in 1804.

Mullanphy was an important philanthropist in the fledgeling St. Louis community, funding, for example, the Hospital of the Sisters of Charity. His son Bryan Mullanphy became mayor of St. Louis.

His family - the surname originally rendered Ó Maolainbhthe - were of County Fermanagh, as was the family of the Irish footballer Eugene Melaniphy (1912–1991).

He died in St. Louis on August 29, 1833, and was buried at Calvary Cemetery.
