= 1981 St. Louis mayoral election =

- April 7, 1981
- Turnout: 24.36%
Candidate	Vincent C. Schoemehl	Jerry Wamser
Party	Democratic	Republican
Popular vote	73,219	37,078
Percentage	66.38%	33.62%
Mayor before election
James F. Conway
Democratic
Elected mayor
Vincent C. Schoemehl
Democratic

The 1981 St. Louis mayoral election was held on April 7, 1981 to elect the mayor of St. Louis, Missouri. It saw the election of Vincent C. Schoemehl and the defeat of incumbent mayor James F. Conway in the Democratic primary.

The election was preceded by party primaries on March 3.

== Democratic primary ==
Democratic primary results
Party	Candidate	Votes	%
Democratic	Vincent C. Schoemehl	70,507	67.16
Democratic	James F. Conway (incumbent)	32,683	31.13
Democratic	Lewis Rolen	1,798	1.71
Turnout		104,988	23.19

== General election ==
General election result
Party	Candidate	Votes	%
Democratic	Vincent C. Schoemehl	73,219	66.38
Republican	Jerry Wamser	37,078	33.62
Turnout		110,297	24.36
