= James S. Thomas (mayor) =

American banker and politician (1802–1874)

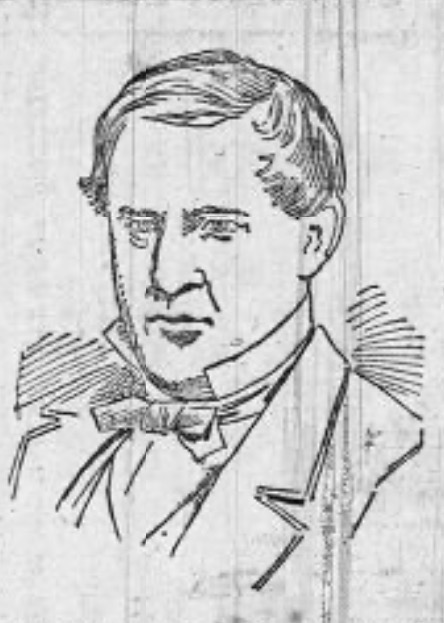

19th Mayor of St. Louis
- In office 1864–1869
- Preceded by: Chauncey Ives Filley
- Succeeded by: Nathan Cole

Personal details
- Born: May 25, 1802 Maryland, US
- Died: October 26, 1874 (aged 72) St. Louis, Missouri, US
- Resting place: Bellefontaine Cemetery
- Party: Republican
- Children: 1
- Occupation: Banker, politician

James S. Thomas (May 25, 1802 – October 26, 1874) was an American banker and politician. A Republican, he served as Mayor of St. Louis.

== Biography ==
Thomas was born on May 25, 1802, in Maryland. In 1825, he moved to St. Louis, and in 1826, opened a bank; his bank was the first in the city. Between 1838 and 1850, he was partnered with banker Louis Auguste Benoist. After their partnership ceased, he retired.

Thomas was a Republican. During the American Civil War, St. Louis was controlled by the Union army and placed under martial law. As a result, he unretired and was appointed by the army to multiple government positions, such as president of the Board of Assessment.

Thomas served as Mayor of St. Louis from 1864 to 1869, being elected to complete the unexpired term of Chauncey Ives Filley; Thomas' tenure the second-longest of a St. Louis mayor at the time. He served during the city's major population growth.

As mayor, Thomas pushed for the city to deprivatize its public services. On December 18, 1865, he signed the ordinance which updated the city's house numbering system to follow blocks; as of 2001, it is still used. He expanded the city's water systems – both its sewage and freshwater. Water infrastructure he helped erect included the Compton Hill Reservoir and the Grand Avenue Water Tower. In 1866, he lessened the impact of a cholera outbreak by appointing sanitary committees to each ward. On March 16, 1869, he created a city Board of Health.

After serving as Mayor, Thomas became a leading figure in the creation of Tower Grove Park. He also spent the remainder of his life a member of the city's Park Board of Commissioners. His first marriage was to a daughter of one Curtis Skinner, and his second was to Susan H. Hackney; he had a daughter with Susan. He died on September 26, 1874, aged 72, in St. Louis. He was buried at Bellefontaine Cemetery.
