= St. Louis Bears =

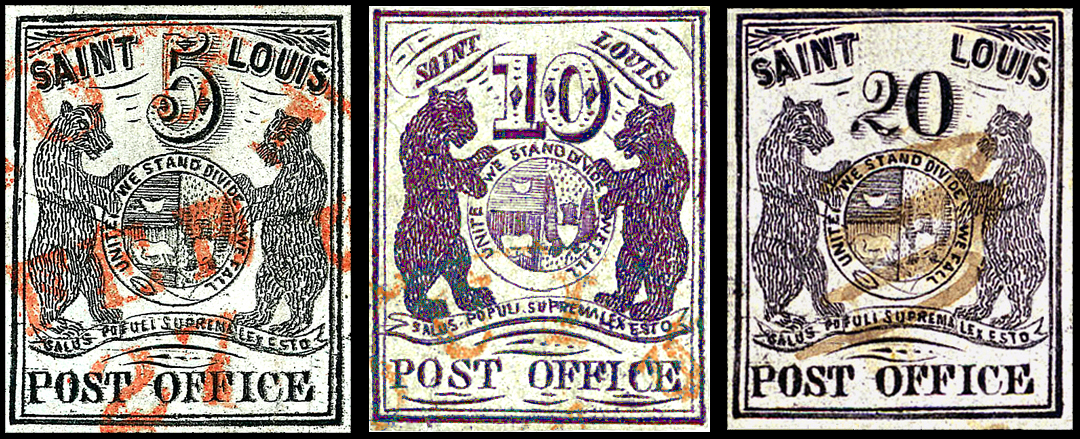
- St. Louis Bears 5¢, 10¢ and 20¢ denominations
- Country of production: United States of America
- Location of production: St. Louis, Missouri
- Date of production: 1845-46
- Nature of rarity: A small quantity exist
- Face value: 5¢, 10¢ and 20¢
- Estimated value: $8,000, $8,000 and $50,000

The St. Louis Bears are a set of Provisional stamps issued by the St. Louis Post office in 1845-46 to facilitate prepayment of postal fees at a time when the United States Post Office had not yet issued postage stamps for national use. St. Louis, whose postmaster, John M. Wimer, instigated the production, was one of eleven cities to produce such stamps. Bears were offered in three denominations: 5¢, 10¢ and 20¢; the earliest known postmark date on a stamp of the issue is November 13, 1845.

== Background ==
The use of provisional stamps became practical after an act of Congress on March 3, 1845 standardized postal fees throughout the nation at 5¢ for a normal-weight letter transported up to 300 miles and 10¢ for a letter transported between 300 and 3000 miles. (Before standardization, the many different postal rates in different jurisdictions had made fees too unpredictable to prepay all letters with stamps as a matter of course, with the result that recipients of letters—rather than senders—generally paid the postage on them.) St. Louis was one of eleven U. S. cities that issued these so-called Postmasters' Provisionals, and—owing to its distance from Atlantic population centers—the only one to offer a provisional denomination larger than 10¢. Moreover, none of the ten other cities produced a provisional stamp design so ambitious in its visual content (its homespun artistic realization notwithstanding). Some provisionals were merely handstamps; others offered engraved letters and numerals and/or reproduced signatures; while two presented portraits of George Washington, one of them—the New York Postmaster's Provisional—engraved with considerable skill by a firm specializing in bank notes. The use of provisionals ceased in the U. S. after national postage stamps became available on July 1, 1847.

The following notice appeared in the Missouri Republican on November 5, 1845:

LETTER STAMPS. Mr. Wimer, the postmaster, has prepared a set of letter stamps, or rather marks, to be put upon letters, indicating that the postage has been paid. In this he has copied after the plan adopted by the postmaster of New York and other cities. These stamps are engraved to represent the Missouri Coat of Arms, and are five and ten cents. They are so prepared that they may be stuck upon a letter like a wafer and will prove a great convenience to merchants and all those having many letters to send post paid, as it saves all trouble of paying at the post-office. They will be sold as they are sold in the East, viz.: Sixteen five-cent stamps and eight ten-cent stamps for a dollar. We would recommend merchants and others to give them a trial.

== Design, production and usage ==
The stamps owe the name "bears" to the image that appears upon them: a drawing of the Great Seal of Missouri, on which two standing bears hold a heraldic disc rimmed with the slogan "Unite[d] we stand[,] divide[d] we fall." The drawing is meant to suggest that the bracketed final "d"s are covered by the bears' paws, but fails in this aim because artist miscalculated the letter-spacing. A third bear is discernible within the disc (in the bottom-left quadrant), which also contains a crescent moon and a sketch of the Great Seal of the United States. A ribbon beneath the bears' feet contains the State of Missouri's motto: Salus populi suprema lex esto (Let the well-being of the people be the highest law.)

The Bears were printed from a copper plate of six images arranged in two vertical rows of three, made by a local engraver, J. M. Kershaw. The plate was of the type intended to produce visiting cards; and another improvisatory aspect of the production is that each of the six stamps on the plate was engraved individually, with the result that no two are identical; each denomination exists in distinctive variants. (This is quite different from the state-or-the-art technique used for the New York Postmaster's Provisional, printed from a plate containing identical images replicated from a single die.) Although in use for only a year-and-a-half, the St. Louis plate was twice modified. In its original form, it produced only 5¢ and 10¢ stamps (the former in the left vertical row, the latter in the right). At some time in 1846 the Postmaster decided that a 20¢ denomination would be of use, and had the two top left images altered to replace their "5"s with "20"s. After sufficient quantities of 20¢ stamps had been stocked the plate was again reworked to restore the original 5¢ denominations. It is known that the first two printings produced 2,000 5¢ stamps, 3,000 10¢ stamps and 1,000 20¢ stamps; the final printing probably added 1,500 5¢ stamps and 1,500 10¢ stamps to the total.

"The use of these stamps of the St. Louis postmaster was entirely optional, and they never became very popular. The writer has examined a number of files of letters written from St. Louis in 1845, 1846 and 1847 without finding a single stamp thereon." Most of the bears were apparently acquired by two firms—Nisbet & Co., Private Bankers, and Crow & McCreery, Wholesale Dry Goods—which used them for business correspondence and made them available to their employees and their families for private letters.

== Research ==
The first known listing of St. Louis Bears in philatelic literature occurred in 1873, but few examples of these stamps were known until 1895, when a porter in the Louisville Kentucky courthouse found a trove of 137 St. Louis Bears while burning waste papers in the furnace. These were authenticated by the noted philatelic expert Charles Haviland Mekeel and enabled him to confirm the existence of the 20¢ denomination (some experts had believed that the few previously known copies were forgeries). At that time, Mekeel could write "No stamps in the world have commanded the price that certain of the stamps of St. Louis have realized." More Bears have since surfaced and their prices have been far outstripped by scarcer philatelic treasures; nevertheless they remain impressively rare, particularly examples of the 20¢ value. Almost all of them, moreover, are in very poor condition. The most common varieties of 5¢ and 10¢ Bears (on greenish paper) are valued in the Scott catalogue at $8,000 in used condition and the 20¢ on gray lilac paper is listed at $50,000. Examples on other paper types are more costly still.

== See also ==
- US provisional issue stamps
- A Gallery of U. S. Postmasters' Provisional Stamps, 1845-47
