= Chauncey Ives Filley =

American politician

Chauncey I. Filley
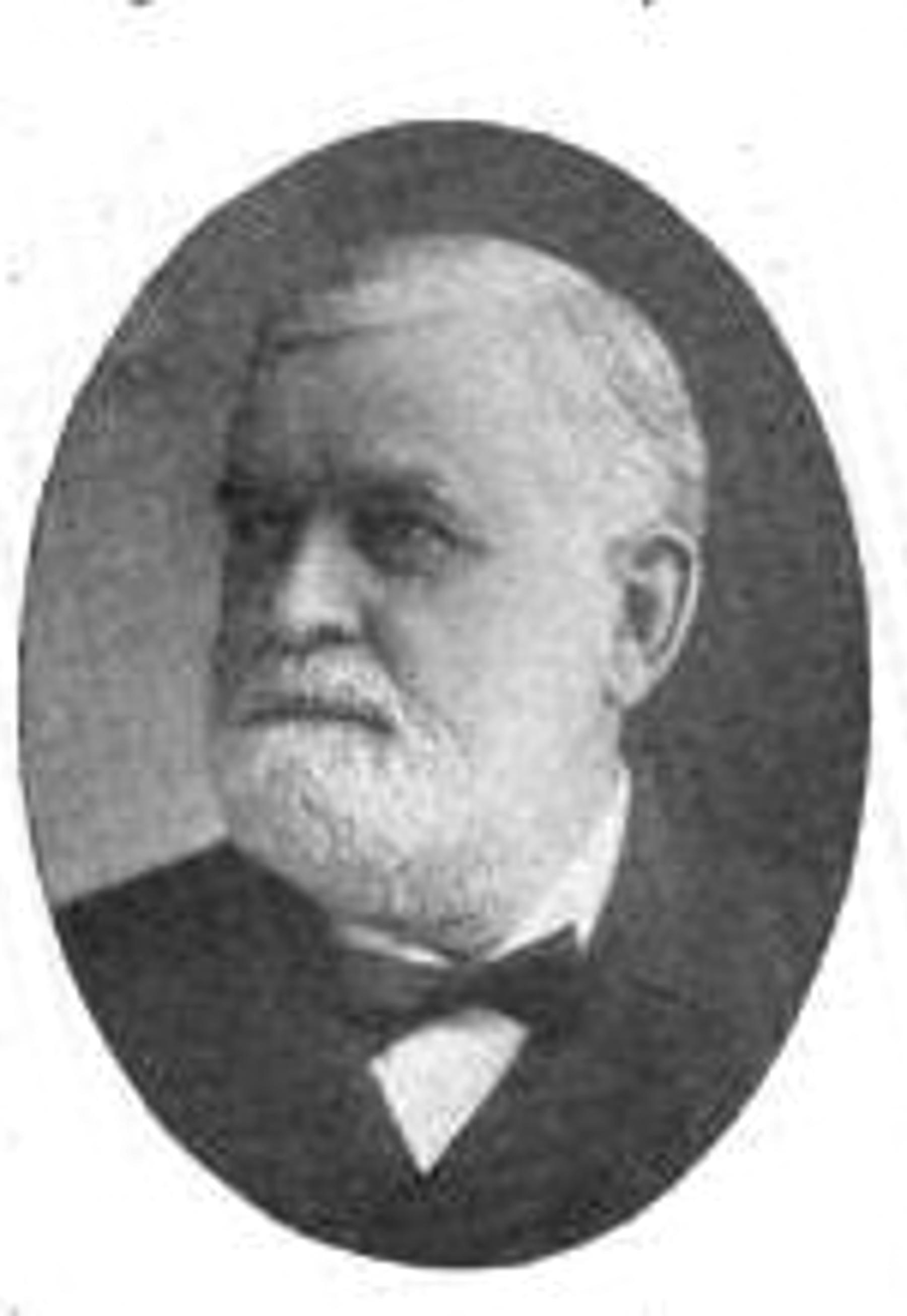

18th Mayor of St. Louis, Missouri
- In office April 14, 1863 – March 19, 1864
- Preceded by: Daniel G. Taylor
- Succeeded by: James S. Thomas

Personal details
- Born: October 17, 1829 Lansingburgh, New York, US
- Died: September 24, 1923 (aged 93) Overland, Missouri, US
- Party: Republican

Chauncey Ives Filley (17 October 1829 - 24 September 1923) was a United States politician active in Missouri.

== Biography ==
Filley was born in Lansingburg, New York. He received a private and academic education and entered commercial life as a clerk. He designed and controlled his own pottery patterns and became the largest importer and distributor of queensware in the Mississippi Valley. He became interested in politics and became the eighteenth mayor of St. Louis, Missouri, in 1863. He resigned from office because of illness after serving only one year of his two-year term.

Filley was a delegate to the Republican National Conventions from 1864 to 1896 and was a member of the Republican National Committee from 1876 to 1892. He was a member of the convention which abolished slavery in the state. From 1873 to 1878, he was postmaster of St. Louis. He is buried at Bellefontaine Cemetery.

== Notes ==
Political offices
Preceded by Daniel G. Taylor	Mayor of St. Louis, Missouri; 1863–1864	Succeeded by James S. Thomas
