= 1969 St. Louis mayoral election =

- April 1, 1969
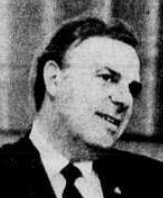

Candidate	Alfonso Cervantes	Gerald Fisher
Party	Democratic	Republican
Popular vote	64,813	41,825
Percentage	60.78%	39.22%
Mayor before election
Alfonso Cervantes
Democratic
Elected mayor
Alfonso Cervantes
Democratic

The 1969 St. Louis mayoral election was held on April 1, 1969, in order to elect the mayor of St. Louis, Missouri. It saw the re-election of incumbent Democratic mayor Alfonso Cervantes over his Republican opponent Gerald Fisher.

== General election ==
On election day, April 1, 1969, Democratic nominee Alfonso Cervantes won re-election by a margin of 22,988 votes against his opponent Republican nominee Gerald Fisher, thereby retaining Democratic control over the office of Mayor of St. Louis. Cervantes was sworn in for his second term on April 15, 1969.

== Results ==
General election result
Party	Candidate	Votes	%
Democratic	Alfonso Cervantes	64,813	60.78
Republican	Gerald Fisher	41,825	39.22
Turnout		106,538	100.00
