= John How =

American politician

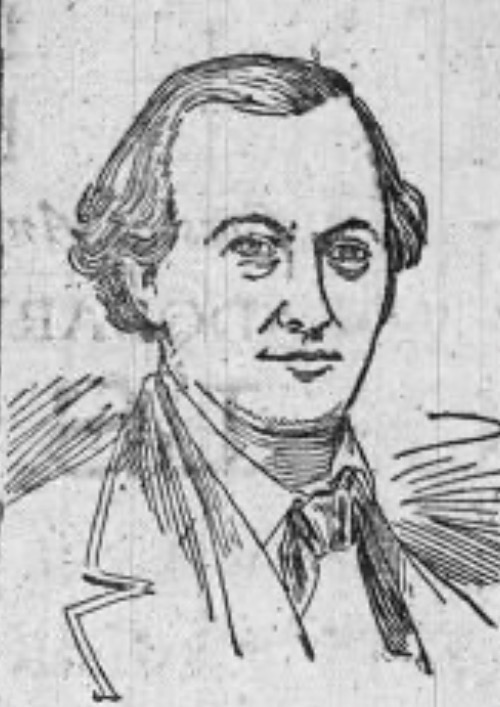

14th Mayor of St. Louis, Missouri
- In office 1844–1846
- Preceded by: Luther Martin Kennett
- Succeeded by: Washington King
- In office 1856–1857
- Preceded by: Washington King
- Succeeded by: John Wimer

Personal details
- Born: c. 1813 Philadelphia, Pennsylvania, US
- Died: January 3, 1885 San Francisco, California, US
- Party: Democratic

John How (c. 1813 – January 3, 1885) was the 14th mayor of St. Louis, Missouri, US, serving from 1853 to 1855 and again from 1856 to 1857.

== Early life ==
How was born in Pennsylvania, but later moved to St. Louis and became a successful merchant.

== Political career ==
In 1853, How defeated Charles P. Chouteau in the St. Louis mayoral election. He served two one-year terms and then left office for one year. He was re-elected in 1856 when he defeated John B. Carson of the Know-Nothing Party.

During How's three terms, he moved a workhouse from a temporary site near the city hospital to a permanent location at Broadway and Meramec. He established a house of refuge and correction for juvenile offenders, set aside land for Marquette Park, and provided the park with a board of managers on which the mayor and two members from each house of City Council would serve. How set aside land for other city parks, including 14.5 acres for Hyde Park. He also purchased the land for the Central Public Library from James H. Lucas. Under How's leadership, the city invested in railroads and had interest in all four major lines. How also created a building inspection office in 1855, requiring building permits under the office of Inspector of Buildings and Fires.

== Personal life ==
He married and had two sons, James F. How, who married a daughter of James Eads, who built Eads Bridge. How moved west in 1869 to begin a mining business. He was an Indian agent at Elko, Nevada, for four years and lived in San Francisco, California, for the last years of his life. He died there on January 3, 1885. How is buried at Bellefontaine Cemetery in St. Louis, Missouri.

Political offices
Preceded by Luther Martin Kennett	Mayor of St. Louis, Missouri; 1853–1855	Succeeded by Washington King
Preceded by Washington King	Mayor of St. Louis, Missouri; 1856–1857	Succeeded by John Wimer
