= Mayor of St. Louis =

Chief executive of St. Louis

Mayor of the City of St. Louis
- Seal of St. Louis, Missouri

- Flag of St. Louis

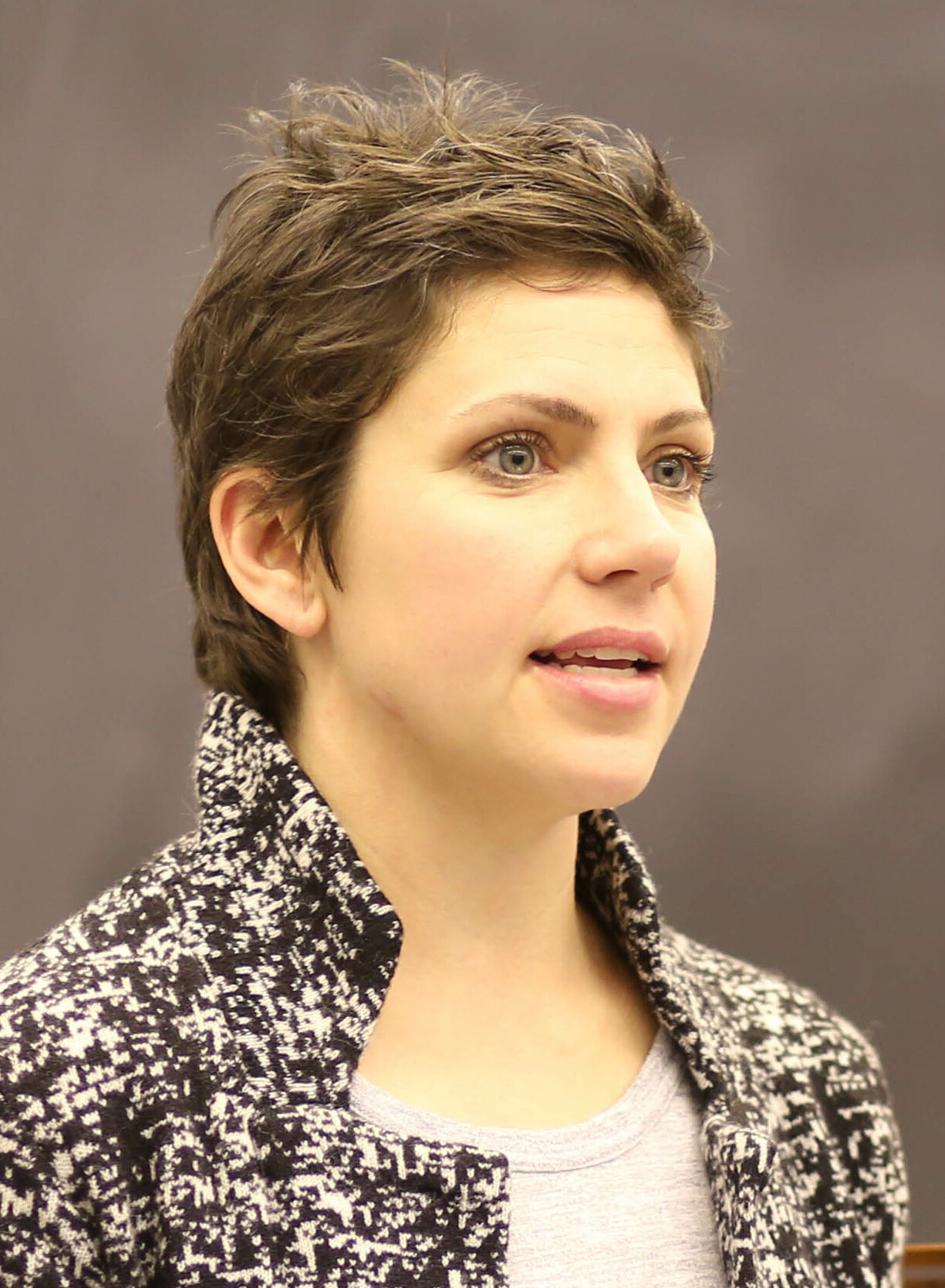
- Incumbent; Cara Spencer since April 15, 2025
- Government of St. Louis
- Style: Madam Mayor; Ms. Mayor (informal)
- Residence: Private
- Seat: St. Louis City Hall
- Term length: Four years, no term limits
- Constituting instrument: St. Louis City Charter
- Inaugural holder: William Carr Lane
- Formation: April 14, 1823; 203 years ago
- Succession: President, Board of Aldermen
- Salary: $161,881 (2024)
- Website: {{Office of the Mayor }}

The Mayor of St. Louis is the chief executive officer of St. Louis's city government. The mayor has a duty to enforce city ordinances and the power to either approve or veto city ordinances passed by the Board of Aldermen..

Forty-eight people have held the office, four of whom—William Carr Lane, John Fletcher Darby, John Wimer, and John How—served non-consecutive terms. Lane, the city's first mayor, served the most terms: eight one-year terms plus the unexpired term of Darby. Francis Slay is the longest-serving mayor, having served four 4-year terms. The second-longest-serving mayor was Henry Kiel, who served 12 years and nine days over three terms in office. Two others — Raymond Tucker and Vincent C. Schoemehl — also served three terms, but seven fewer days. The shortest-serving mayor was Arthur Barret, who died 11 days after taking office. The first female mayor was Lyda Krewson, who served from 2017 to 2021.

== Duties and powers ==
St. Louis was incorporated as a city on December 9, 1822, four months after Missouri was admitted as a state to the Union. In accordance with its new charter, the city changed its governance to a mayor-council format and elected its first mayor, William Carr Lane, on April 7, 1823.

=== Cabinet ===
Spencer Administration
Office	Name	Term
Mayor	Cara Spencer	2025–present
Chief of Staff	Casey Millburg	2025–present
President, Board of Public Service	Richard T. Bradley, P.E.	2025–present
Supply Commissioner	Chris Carter	2025–present
Court Administrator	Diarra Cross-Davis	2025–present
Director, Department of Public Safety	Shawn Dace	2025–present
Interim City Counselor	Michael Garvin	2025–present
Executive Director, Affordable Housing Commission	April Ford Griffin	2025–present
Director, St. Louis Lambert International Airport	Rhonda Hamm-Niebruegge	
Director, Department of Parks, Recreation, and Forestry	Greg Hayes	2025–present
Chief Technology Officer	Simon Huang	2025–present
Street Department Director	James Jackson	2025–present
Chief Medical Examiner	Kanayo Tatsumi, M.D.	2025–present
Executive Director, St. Louis Agency on Training and Employment (SLATE)	Connie Johnson	2025–present
Director of Personnel	Brian Light	2025–present
Director, Civil Rights Enforcement Agency	Dr. Vernon Mitchell, Jr.	2025–present
Executive Director, Community Development Administration	Matt Moak	2025–present
Director, Department of Public Utilities and Water Commissioner	Niraj S. Patel, P.E.	2025–present
Director, Budget Division	Paul Payne	1988–present
Director, Department of Human Services	Adam Pearson	2025–present
Chief Information Officer, (Director of ITSA)	Cindy Riordan	2025–present
Executive Director, Planning and Urban Design Agency	Don Roe	2025–present
Chief Operating Officer	Colonel Benjamin Jonsson	2025–present

== Elections ==
The mayor is elected for four years during the general municipal election, which is held every two years on the first Tuesday after the first Monday in April. The candidates are selected through a combined approval voting primary, with the top two advancing to the general. The mayor is usually sworn during the first session of the Board of Aldermen two weeks after the election.

Under the original city charter, the mayor was elected to a one-year term. Terms became two years under the 1859 city charter. The mayor's office was extended to its present four-year term after passage of the Charter and Scheme in 1876 which separated the City of St. Louis from St. Louis County.

== Succession ==
If the office of mayor becomes vacant through death, resignation, recall, or removal by the board of aldermen, the president of the board of aldermen becomes mayor until a special mayoral election can be held; if the office is only temporarily vacant due to disability of the mayor, the president only acts out the duties of mayor. Should both offices be vacant, the vice-president of the board of aldermen becomes mayor.

Five people have acted as mayor: Wilson Primm following the resignation of John Darby; Ferdinand W. Cronenbold following the resignation of Chauncey Filley; Herman Rechtien following the death of Arthur Barret; George W. Allen following the resignation of David Francis; and Aloys P. Kaufmann following the death of William Becker.

== List of mayors ==
No. (Note: 47 people have served as mayor, with four serving non-consecutive terms; the table includes these non-consecutive terms as well.)	Mayor	Took office	Left office	Time in office	Election	Party
1	William Carr Lane (1789–1863); 1st time	April 14, 1823	April 14, 1829	6 years, 0 days	1823	Whig
1	William Carr Lane (1789–1863); 1st time	April 14, 1823	April 14, 1829	6 years, 0 days	1824	Whig
1	William Carr Lane (1789–1863); 1st time	April 14, 1823	April 14, 1829	6 years, 0 days	1825	Whig
1	William Carr Lane (1789–1863); 1st time	April 14, 1823	April 14, 1829	6 years, 0 days	1826	Whig
1	William Carr Lane (1789–1863); 1st time	April 14, 1823	April 14, 1829	6 years, 0 days	1827	Whig
1	William Carr Lane (1789–1863); 1st time	April 14, 1823	April 14, 1829	6 years, 0 days	1828	Whig
2	Daniel Page (1790–1869)	April 14, 1829	November 11, 1833 (Note: Samuel Merry was elected mayor of St. Louis in April 1833; however, his eligibility was questioned by the City Council as he was a federal officer—United States Receiver of Public Moneys in St. Louis. Merry filed suit to force the council's compliance and in October 1833, he was ruled ineligible by the Missouri Supreme Court. Johnston was elected mayor in a special mayoral election held a month later on November 9. Page continued to serve as mayor until the case was settled and Johnston elected.)	4 years, 211 days	1829	Whig
2	Daniel Page (1790–1869)	April 14, 1829	November 11, 1833	4 years, 211 days	1830	Whig
2	Daniel Page (1790–1869)	April 14, 1829	November 11, 1833	4 years, 211 days	1831	Whig
2	Daniel Page (1790–1869)	April 14, 1829	November 11, 1833	4 years, 211 days	1832	Whig
–	Samuel Merry (TBA–TBA); Disputed	Ruled ineligible; did not serve			~~Apr.~~; ~~1833~~	Unknown
3	John W. Johnston (1774–1854)	November 11, 1833	April 14, 1835	1 year, 154 days	Nov. 1833	Whig
3	John W. Johnston (1774–1854)	November 11, 1833	April 14, 1835	1 year, 154 days	1834	Whig
4	John Fletcher Darby (1803–1882); 1st time	April 14, 1835	October 31, 1837 (Note: Resigned from office.) (Note: Darby resigned from office. William Carr Lane was later elected to fill the vacancy.)	2 years, 200 days	1835	Whig
4	John Fletcher Darby (1803–1882); 1st time	April 14, 1835	October 31, 1837	2 years, 200 days	1836	Whig
4	John Fletcher Darby (1803–1882); 1st time	April 14, 1835	October 31, 1837	2 years, 200 days	Apr. 1837	Whig
–	Wilson Primm (TBA–TBA); Acting	October 31, 1837	November 15, 1837	15 days	– (Note: As president of the Board of Aldermen, Primm acted as mayor following the resignation of Darby.)	Whig
(1)	William Carr Lane (1789–1863); 2nd time	November 15, 1837	April 14, 1840	2 years, 151 days	Nov. 1837	Whig
(1)	William Carr Lane (1789–1863); 2nd time	November 15, 1837	April 14, 1840	2 years, 151 days	1838	Whig
(1)	William Carr Lane (1789–1863); 2nd time	November 15, 1837	April 14, 1840	2 years, 151 days	1839	Whig
(4)	John Fletcher Darby (1803–1882); 2nd time	April 14, 1840	April 13, 1841	364 days	1840	Whig
5	John D. Daggett (1793–1874)	April 13, 1841	April 12, 1842	364 days	1841	Whig
6	George Maguire (1796–1882)	April 12, 1842	April 11, 1843	364 days	1842	Democratic
7	John Wimer (1810–1863); 1st time	April 11, 1843	April 9, 1844	364 days	1843	Democratic
8	Bernard Pratte (1803–1886)	April 9, 1844	April 14, 1846	2 years, 5 days	1844	Whig
8	Bernard Pratte (1803–1886)	April 9, 1844	April 14, 1846	2 years, 5 days	1845	Whig
9	Peter G. Camden (1801–1873)	April 14, 1846	April 13, 1847	364 days	1846	American
10	Bryan Mullanphy (1809–1851)	April 13, 1847	April 11, 1848	364 days	1847	Democratic
11	John M. Krum (1810–1883)	April 10, 1848	April 10, 1849	1 year, 0 days	1848	Democratic
12	James G. Barry (1800–1880)	April 10, 1849	April 9, 1850	364 days	1849	Democratic
13	Luther Martin Kennett (1807–1873)	April 9, 1850	April 12, 1853	3 years, 3 days	1850	Whig
13	Luther Martin Kennett (1807–1873)	April 9, 1850	April 12, 1853	3 years, 3 days	1851	Whig
13	Luther Martin Kennett (1807–1873)	April 9, 1850	April 12, 1853	3 years, 3 days	1852	Whig
14	John How (c. 1813–1885); 1st time	April 12, 1853	April 10, 1855	1 year, 363 days	1853	Democratic
14	John How (c. 1813–1885); 1st time	April 12, 1853	April 10, 1855	1 year, 363 days	1854	Democratic
15	Washington King (1815–1861)	April 10, 1855	April 15, 1856	1 year, 5 days	1855	American
(14)	John How (c. 1813–1885); 2nd time	April 15, 1856	April 14, 1857	364 days	1856	Democratic
(7)	John Wimer (1810–1863); 2nd time	April 14, 1857	April 13, 1858	364 days	1857	Democratic
16	Oliver Filley (1806–1881)	April 13, 1858	April 9, 1861	2 years, 361 days	1858	Republican
16	Oliver Filley (1806–1881)	April 13, 1858	April 9, 1861	2 years, 361 days	1859	Republican
17	Daniel G. Taylor (1819–1878)	April 9, 1861	April 14, 1863	2 years, 5 days	1861	Republican
18	Chauncey Ives Filley (1829–1923)	April 14, 1863	March 19, 1864 (Note: Filley resigned due to poor health.)	340 days	1863	Republican
–	Ferdinand W. Cronenbold (TBA–TBA); Acting	March 19, 1864	April 11, 1864	23 days	– (Note: As president of the Board of Common Council, Cronenbold acted as mayor following the resignation of Chauncey Filley.)	Unknown
19	James S. Thomas (1802–1874)	April 11, 1864	April 13, 1869	5 years, 2 days	1864 special	Republican
19	James S. Thomas (1802–1874)	April 11, 1864	April 13, 1869	5 years, 2 days	1865	Republican
19	James S. Thomas (1802–1874)	April 11, 1864	April 13, 1869	5 years, 2 days	1867	Republican
20	Nathan Cole (1825–1904)	April 13, 1869	April 11, 1871	1 year, 363 days	1869	Republican
21	Joseph Brown (1823–1899)	April 11, 1871	April 13, 1875	4 years, 2 days	1871	War Democrat
21	Joseph Brown (1823–1899)	April 11, 1871	April 13, 1875	4 years, 2 days	1873	War Democrat
22	Arthur Barret (1836–1875)	April 13, 1875	April 24, 1875 (Note: Died in office.)	11 days	Apr. 1875	Democratic
–	Herman Rechtien (TBA–TBA); Acting	April 24, 1875	May 29, 1875	35 days	– (Note: As president of the City Council, Rechtin acted as mayor following the death of Arthur Barret.)	Unknown
23	James H. Britton (1817–1900)	May 29, 1875	February 9, 1876 (Note: Henry Overstolz was declared defeated by James Britton in the 1875 election, but contested the election and was seated as mayor nine months later after a recount of the ballots.)	256 days	~~May~~; ~~1875~~	Democratic
24	Henry Overstolz (1821–1887)	February 9, 1876	April 12, 1881	5 years, 62 days	May; 1875	Independent
24	Henry Overstolz (1821–1887)	February 9, 1876	April 12, 1881	5 years, 62 days	1877	Independent
25	William L. Ewing (1843–1905)	April 12, 1881	April 14, 1885	4 years, 2 days	1881	Republican
26	David R. Francis (1850–1927)	April 14, 1885	January 2, 1889 (Note: Resigned to become Governor of Missouri.)	3 years, 263 days	1885	Democratic
–	George W. Allen (TBA–TBA); Acting	January 2, 1889	April 6, 1889	94 days	– (Note: As president of the City Council, Allen acted as mayor following the resignation of David Francis.)	Democratic
27	Edward A. Noonan (1852–1927)	April 6, 1889	April 8, 1893	4 years, 2 days	1889	Democratic
28	Cyrus Walbridge (1849–1921)	April 8, 1893	April 10, 1897	4 years, 2 days	1893	Republican
29	Henry Ziegenhein (c. 1845–1910)	April 10, 1897	April 9, 1901	3 years, 364 days	1897	Republican
30	Rolla Wells (1856–1944)	April 9, 1901	April 13, 1909	8 years, 4 days	1901	Democratic
30	Rolla Wells (1856–1944)	April 9, 1901	April 13, 1909	8 years, 4 days	1905	Democratic
31	Frederick Kreismann (1869–1944)	April 13, 1909	April 12, 1913	3 years, 364 days	1909	Republican
32	Henry Kiel (1871–1942)	April 12, 1913	April 21, 1925	12 years, 9 days	1913	Republican
32	Henry Kiel (1871–1942)	April 12, 1913	April 21, 1925	12 years, 9 days	1917	Republican
32	Henry Kiel (1871–1942)	April 12, 1913	April 21, 1925	12 years, 9 days	1921	Republican
33	Victor J. Miller (1888–1955)	April 21, 1925	April 18, 1933	7 years, 362 days	1925	Republican
33	Victor J. Miller (1888–1955)	April 21, 1925	April 18, 1933	7 years, 362 days	1929	Republican
34	Bernard F. Dickmann (1888–1971)	April 18, 1933	April 15, 1941	7 years, 362 days	1933	Democratic
34	Bernard F. Dickmann (1888–1971)	April 18, 1933	April 15, 1941	7 years, 362 days	1937	Democratic
35	William D. Becker (1876–1943)	April 15, 1941	August 1, 1943	2 years, 108 days	1941	Republican
–	Aloys P. Kaufmann (1902–1984)	August 1, 1943	TBA	TBA	– (Note: As president of the Board of Aldermen, Kaufmann became mayor following the death of William Becker. He was later elected mayor, in a special mayoral election in November 1944, to fill Becker's unexpired term.)	Republican
36	Aloys P. Kaufmann (1902–1984)	TBA	April 19, 1949	TBA	1944 special	Republican
37	Joseph Darst (1889–1953)	April 19, 1949	April 21, 1953	4 years, 2 days	1949	Democratic
38	Raymond Tucker (1896–1970)	April 21, 1953	April 20, 1965	11 years, 364 days	1953	Democratic
38	Raymond Tucker (1896–1970)	April 21, 1953	April 20, 1965	11 years, 364 days	1957	Democratic
38	Raymond Tucker (1896–1970)	April 21, 1953	April 20, 1965	11 years, 364 days	1961	Democratic
39	Alfonso J. Cervantes (1920–1983)	April 20, 1965	April 17, 1973	7 years, 362 days	1965	Democratic
39	Alfonso J. Cervantes (1920–1983)	April 20, 1965	April 17, 1973	7 years, 362 days	1969	Democratic
40	John Poelker (1913–1990)	April 17, 1973	April 19, 1977	4 years, 2 days	1973	Democratic
41	James F. Conway (1932–2025)	April 19, 1977	April 21, 1981	4 years, 2 days	1977	Democratic
42	Vincent C. Schoemehl (born 1946)	April 21, 1981	April 20, 1993	11 years, 364 days	1981	Democratic
42	Vincent C. Schoemehl (born 1946)	April 21, 1981	April 20, 1993	11 years, 364 days	1985	Democratic
42	Vincent C. Schoemehl (born 1946)	April 21, 1981	April 20, 1993	11 years, 364 days	1989	Democratic
43	Freeman Bosley Jr. (born 1954)	April 20, 1993	April 15, 1997	3 years, 360 days	1993	Democratic
44	Clarence Harmon (born 1940)	April 15, 1997	April 17, 2001	4 years, 2 days	1997	Democratic
45	Francis Slay (born 1955)	April 17, 2001	April 18, 2017	16 years, 1 day	2001	Democratic
45	Francis Slay (born 1955)	April 17, 2001	April 18, 2017	16 years, 1 day	2005	Democratic
45	Francis Slay (born 1955)	April 17, 2001	April 18, 2017	16 years, 1 day	2009	Democratic
45	Francis Slay (born 1955)	April 17, 2001	April 18, 2017	16 years, 1 day	2013	Democratic
46	Lyda Krewson (born 1953)	April 18, 2017	April 20, 2021	4 years, 2 days	2017	Democratic
47	Tishaura Jones (born 1972)	April 20, 2021	April 15, 2025	3 years, 360 days	2021	Democratic
48	Cara Spencer (born 1978)	April 15, 2025	Incumbent	1 year, 207 days	2025	Democratic

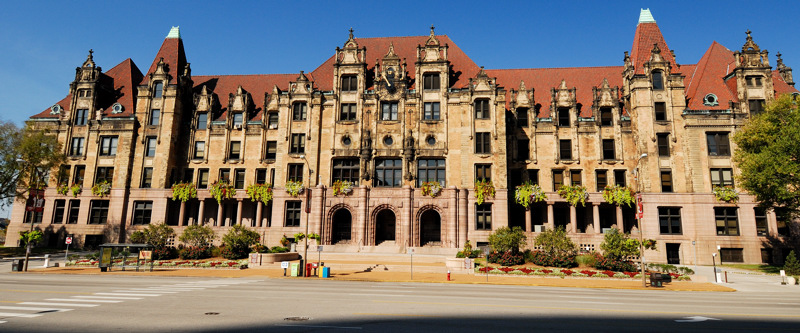
The Mayor of St. Louis has an office on the second floor of City Hall.
