= Oliver Filley =

American politician (1806–1881)

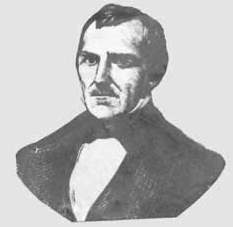

16th Mayor of St. Louis, Missouri
- In office 1858–1861
- Preceded by: Washington King
- Succeeded by: Daniel G. Taylor

Personal details
- Born: Oliver Dwight Filley; May 23, 1806 Bloomfield, Connecticut
- Died: August 21, 1881 (aged 75) Hampton, New Hampshire
- Party: Republican
- Spouse: Chloe Velina Brown (m. 1835)
- Relations: Dwight Filley Davis (grandson)
- Parent(s): Oliver Filley; Annis Humphrey

Oliver Dwight Filley (May 23, 1806 – August 21, 1881) was an American businessman, abolitionist, and politician who served as the 16th mayor of St. Louis, Missouri, from 1858 to 1861.

== Early life ==
Filley was born on May 23, 1806, in Bloomfield, Connecticut. He was the eldest of six children, five sons and one daughter, born to Oliver Filley and Annis (née Humphrey) Filley. His siblings included Marcus Lucius Filley, Jay Humphrey Filley, Joseph Earl Filley, Giles Franklin Filley, Jennette Annis Filley and John Eldridge Filley, who all became prominent.

== Career ==
In 1829, Filley migrated to St. Louis, Missouri. He ran a successful tinware business in St. Louis, eventually amassing a fortune and retired in 1873. He was a director of the Bank of the State of Missouri, and "subscribed largely" to the Kansas Pacific Railway. He contributed financially to Frank P. Blair's antislavery newspaper the St. Louis Union.

=== Mayor of St. Louis ===
Originally, Filley was a "hard money Jackson Democrat" and a personal friend of Thomas H. Benton, the Democratic U.S. Senator from Missouri from 1821 to 1851 who was a champion of westward expansion in the United States, a cause that became known as Manifest Destiny. During the time late 1840s when the Wilmot Proviso proposed to ban slavery in territory acquired from Mexico in the Mexican War,. Filley declared himself in full support of Free Soil and the emancipation of Missouri, leading him to support Martin Van Buren in the presidential election of 1848. The Free Soil party was eventually absorbed into the Republican party.

He was the first Civil War mayor of St. Louis and he became the first mayor elected for a two-year term under the new City Charter of 1859. He was reluctant to take the position. As mayor, he headed the movement for arousing and consolidating union sentiment as the chairman for the Committee of Public Safety. The Fire Alarm Telegraph System was completed and put into use during his term in office.

== Personal life ==
In 1835, Filley was married to Chloe Velina Brown (1808–1890), the daughter of Eli Brown, in Bloomfied, Connecticut. In St. Louis, the family lived at 2201 Lucas Place and attended the Central Presbyterian Church. Together, they were the parents of six children, including:

- Oliver Brown Filley (1836–1887), one of the proprietors of the Fulton Iron Works who married Mary McKinley.
- Ellen Filley (1841–1929), an Emma Willard School alumna who married Thomas Tilden Richards (1840–1881) in 1865.
- Maria Jeannette Filley (1843–1930), who married John Tilden Davis (1844–1894).
- Alice Filley (1845–1933), who married Robert Moore (1838–1922), a civil engineer.
- Henry Marcus Filley (1847–1902), Washington University in St. Louis graduate.
- Jeanette Filley (1850–1933), who married Isaac Wyman Morton (1847–1903) in 1877.
- John Dwight Filley (1853–1930), the president of the American Manufacturing Company who married Fannie Douglass.

Filley died on August 21, 1881, of acute kidney disease while vacationing in Hampton, New Hampshire. He was buried in Bellefontaine Cemetery.

=== Descendants ===
Through his eldest son Oliver, he was the grandfather of Oliver Dwight Filley (1883–1961), was a Harvard graduate and pilot who volunteered with the British Air Force during World War I (before America entered the War) and was married to Mary Percy Pyne (b. 1893), the daughter of Percy Rivington Pyne II, in 1917.

Another grandson was Dwight Filley Davis (1879–1945), who served as the 49th United States Secretary of War from October 14, 1925, until March 4, 1929, in the administration of Calvin Coolidge and later as the Governor-General of the Philippines from 1929 until 1932.

Political offices
| Preceded by Washington King | Mayor of St. Louis, Missouri; 1858–1861 | Succeeded by Daniel G. Taylor |
