= Page, Bacon & Co. =

Defunct 1850s American bank in San Francisco

- Page, Bacon and Company
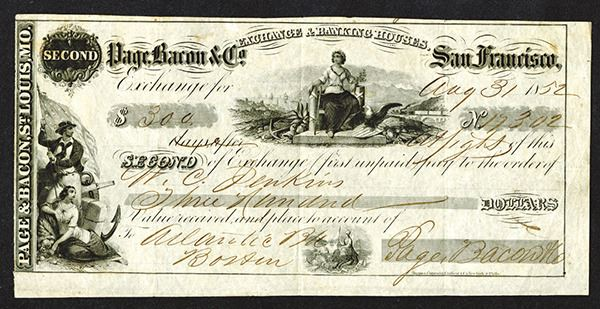
- 1852 bill of exchange
- Dissolved: 1855
- Type: Partnership
- Purpose: Banking
- Location: San Francisco, United States
- Region served: California
- Owners: Daniel Page; Henry D. Bacon
- Parent organization: Page & Bacon of St. Louis

Page, Bacon & Co., an affiliate of Page & Bacon of St. Louis, was a bank founded in San Francisco in 1850 during the California Gold Rush. The St. Louis house became overextended in 1854 due to problems financing a railway, and closed in January 1855. When the news reached San Francisco five weeks later, it triggered a run on the San Francisco house, which was also forced to close. The run affected other banks, many small depositors lost part of their savings and over 200 San Francisco business had to close.

== Page & Bacon ==
In 1848 Daniel Page, the former mayor of St. Louis, partnered with his son-in-law Henry D. Bacon and created the banking house of Page & Bacon. Page was a very wealthy man, but his assets were mainly land and property in St. Louis. He had once been a baker, and did not know much about the banking business, which was managed by Bacon. Page & Bacon came to be considered one of the most reliable in the west.

Page & Bacon were not allowed to issue bank notes in Missouri, but instead issued certificates of deposit in denominations of $1 to $20, which they redeemed at 0.25% discount. The notes looked similar to bank notes, and served much the same function. Page & Bacon formed the Quincy City Bank in Quincy, Illinois in partnership with Flagg & Savage of that city, and their certificates were nominally payable by Flagg & Savage, an arrangement that let them circumvent the Missouri regulations. Some admired Page & Bacon's gambit, but others felt it was risky and could lead to the bank becoming overextended. In 1853 they were found guilty of illegal banking, fined and forced to redeem all outstanding notes, which strained their resources.

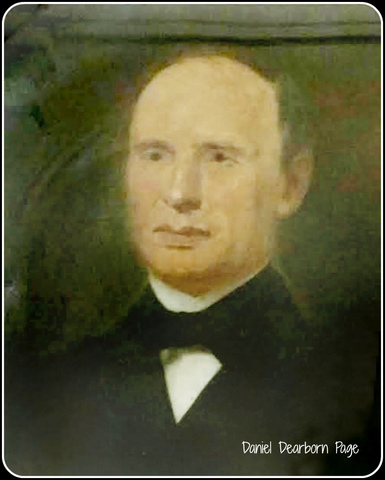
Daniel Dearborn Page (1790–1869)

Page & Bacon became involved in various non-banking enterprises. They funded a railroad in Illinois, financed waterway upgrades on the Des Moines River, looked into developing a new model of steam engine and seem to have been involved in draining swampland in southeast Missouri. They made large advances to the contractors building the Ohio and Mississippi Railroad. To secure their loan, they had to eventually take on all the liabilities of the contractors, and had to borrow in New York and raise money from elsewhere to buy materials and pay the workers on the railroad. They pressed Page, Bacon & Co. of San Francisco to ship them gold dust and to maintain as large a balance as possible in New York to sustain their credit.

During the boom year of 1853 Henry Bacon was able to sell railroad bonds in London and Paris without difficulty, but these markets dried up due to the Crimean War (1853–1856). By 1854 the railway and the bank were struggling to obtain financing. On July 24, 1854, their London agent, Frederick Huth & Co., wrote:

We are in receipt of your favors of 6th & 13th inst. and do not lose sight of your Ohio & Mississippi Bonds, but ever since they have been delivered to us the market for all American securities except first rate State bonds has been so dull, that there has been no possibility of selling any amount. … [W]hilst the minimum rate of discount of the Bank of England continues at 5-1/2%, money is so much sought after in this country that foreign investments are little thought of. It is not so much a question of price, but the difficulty is to find any Capitalists willing to send their money abroad.

Bacon was in serious trouble by the end of 1854. He sent his father-in-law to San Francisco to try to get Page, Bacon & Co. to ship more gold, and went to New York in search of more credit. To make matters worse, Belcher & Brothers, a major St. Louis sugar refiner who owed the bank about $300,000, became distressed and seemed likely to default. On January 12, 1855 Duncan, Sherman & Company of New York began to refuse the drafts of Page & Bacon. On January 14, 1855, Page & Bacon suspended business in St. Louis. Unaware of the failure, between January 12 and February 17, 1855, Page, Bacon & Co. shipped gold worth $1,968,000 from San Francisco on five weekly steamers.

== Page, Bacon & Co. ==
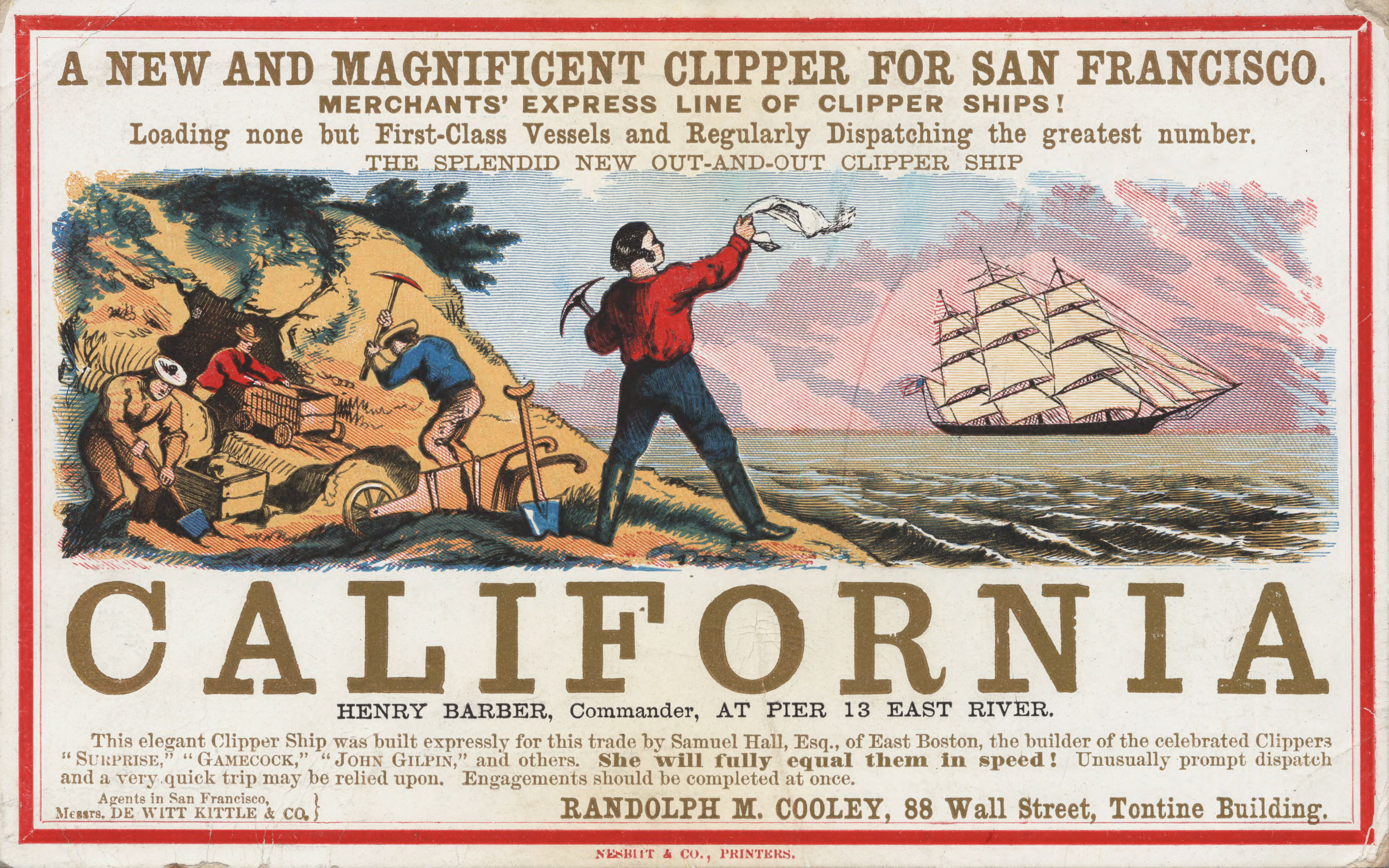
Sailing card for the clipper ship California, depicting scenes from the California gold rush c. 1850

On January 24, 1848, James Marshall found gold near Coloma, California, and the news started the California Gold Rush. Gold transformed the sleepy Californian economy. In 1850 Page and Baron sent their young associates Henry Haight (Note: The future General William T. Sherman said of Henry Haight that he was "too fond of lager beer to be to be entrusted with so large a business". Haight Street in San Francisco is named after him.) and David Chambers with Page's son, Francis W. Page, to start the banking house of Page, Bacon & Co. in San Francisco. The three left New York in May 1850 and reached San Francisco on June 21, 1850. (Note: The Pacific Mail Steamship Company provided a regular mail service between San Francisco and New York that took about five weeks. Twice a month a steamer sailed from San Francisco to Panama City, while another sailed from New York to Chagres (Colón) on the other side of the isthmus of Panama. Passengers would cross the isthmus, a three day journey by canoe and mule, then take the waiting steamer to their destination.)

Henry Haight was the manager of Page, Bacon & Co. Page, Bacon & Co. had the same partners as Page & Bacon of St. Louis, plus Henry Haight, Judge Chambers and Frank Page, who was in charge of the Sacramento branch. Unlike other states, California did not allow banks to issue private bank notes, and only allowed banking by individuals or general partnerships like Page, Bacon & Co. with unlimited liability. Page & Bacon supplied the partnership with capital, a recognized name and a correspondent banking arrangement.

By the end of June Page, Bacon & Co. had opened an office in San Francisco on Clay Street, and by October had an office on Montgomery Street. Services included holding valuables for safekeeping, discounting bills of exchange, making or arranging loans and selling drafts on correspondents in other cities. An important part of the business was buying gold dust, or accepting gold dust in return for bills of exchange that they sent east for their customers.

Page, Bacon & Co. was the largest bank in San Francisco by the end of 1851, and in the first half of 1852 shipped about a quarter of all gold carried from California by steamer. It is not known how much of this gold was sent for their customers and how much for the St. Louis house or for the San Francisco house. They were the leading bankers in California in 1853–1855, and there were no doubts about their wealth and stability. They had almost $2 million in deposits, with about $700,000 in highly stable certificates of deposit held by thousands of gold miners.

The Willamette Falls Company, a ship builder of Oregon City was backed and controlled by Page, Bacon & Company. It started operations in 1853. Its second steamer was the Gazelle, whose boilers exploded on April 8, 1854, killing over 20 people.

== Bank run ==
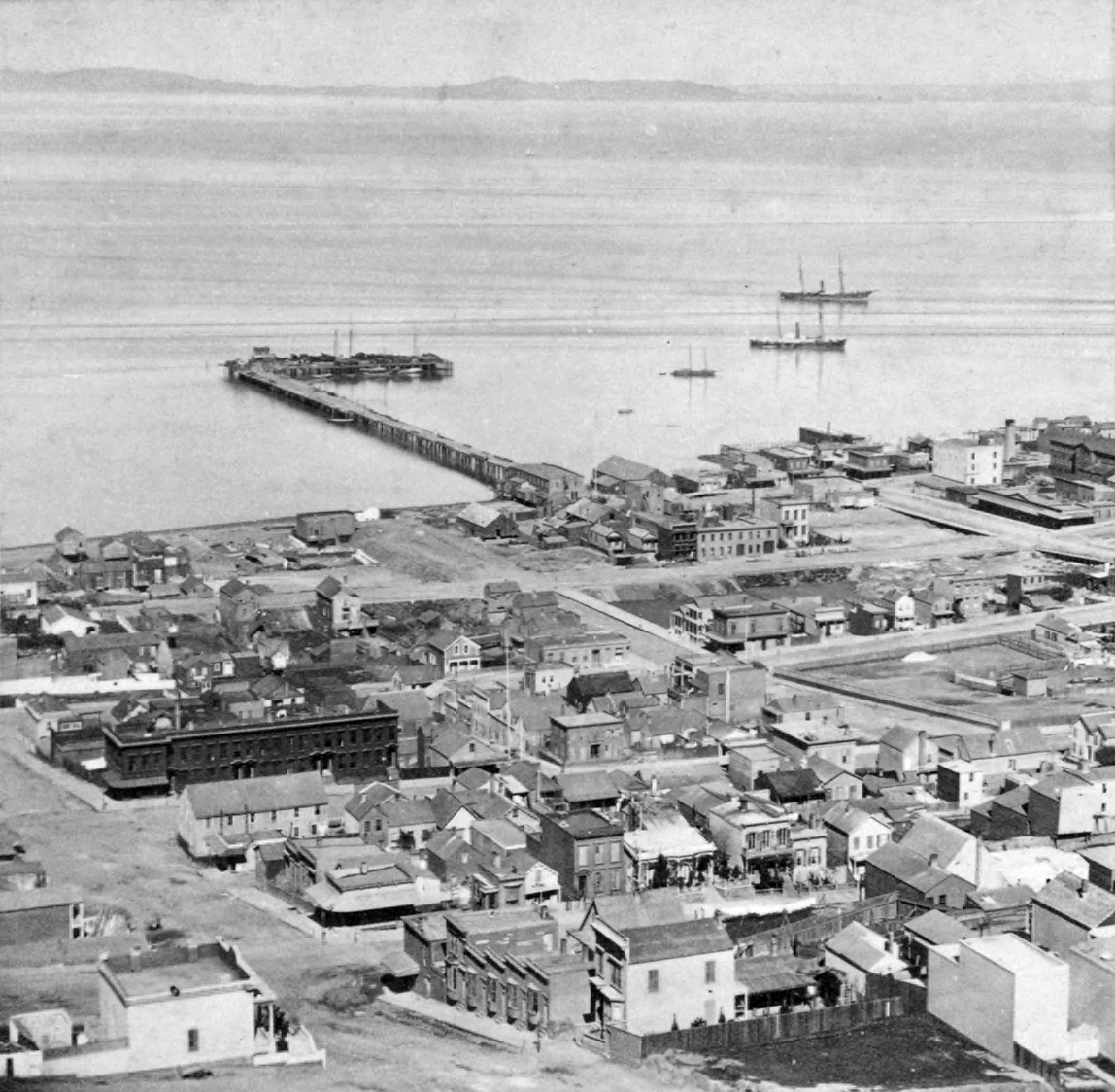
North Beach and Meigg's Wharf, from Russian Hill, San Francisco c. 1865

A mail steamer arrived in San Francisco on February 17, 1855, and at Meiggs Wharf on North Beach threw ashore express parcels of news. A passenger on deck called to a friend on the wharf that Page & Bacon had failed in New York, and the news spread fast. The newspapers gave a slightly less alarming account, saying that only some acceptances of Page & Bacon had gone to protest. It was pointed out that two firms were different concerns, and that every draft of Page, Bacon & Co. had been paid in New York. Despite this, there was a steady run on Page, Bacon & Co. over the next three days. On the first day the bank paid out about $600,000 in gold coin. Archibald Alexander Ritchie was one of the 25 businessmen elected to try to reduce the panic.

William Tecumseh Sherman was manager of the San Francisco branch of the St. Louis-based bank Lucas, Turner & Co. at this time. On February 20, 1855, Henry Haight came to Lucas, Turner & Co. to see if they could help, but Sherman was out. His bank was in a strong condition, and he walked over to Page, Bacon & Co. that night to offer help. He found Frank Page, Henry Haight and Judge Page there. Haight was drunk, and said that all the banks would break, since none could instantly pay all their obligations. Sherman said he had come to offer to give cash in exchange for his bullion, notes and bills, but he would not be drawn into their failure. The run on Page, Bacon & Co. continued through February 21, 1855.

== Collapse ==
In the morning of February 22, 1855, all the banks in San Francisco received notice that Page, Bacon & Co. was closing for a short time due to lack of coin. Judge Chambers then determined that the bank had to be closed by an injunction, which took effect that morning. Receivers were appointed under the terms of the injunction, and they were to examine the assets and liabilities, and either pay creditors in full or in proportion to the sum due to them. The Sacramento branch had opened its doors and started business when the news was received by telegraph, and it was forced to close.

There were steady withdrawals from the other banks on February 22, 1855. On the morning of February 23, 1855, Adams & Co. said they could not open, which caused a general run on the banks. All the banks had to close that day apart from Lucas, Turner & Co., including Wells Fargo & Co. and Palmer, Cook & Co. The Sacramento Daily Union of February 23, 1855, reported, "The announcement which was made yesterday, between nine and ten o'clock in the morning, that the Banking House of Page, Bacon & Co. had closed, caused a financial excitement in our city of the most intense character. Never in the history of our young city have its merchants and business men passed a day of such anxiety, doubt and agitation. Business came nearly to a stand still, and men seemed almost paralyzed by the force and suddenness of the shock."

The Sacramento Daily Union calculated that the firm should have more than enough assets to cover its liabilities, although it did not have enough cash on hand to make immediate payments. However, this depended on the extent to which Page, Bacon & Co. had lent money to Page & Bacon, which might not be repaid. In the event, Page, Bacon & Co., Adams & Co. and several smaller houses failed, and small depositors suffered large losses. 200 businesses failed in San Francisco as a result. The crisis led to a restructuring of the financial sector in California. The event would be known years afterwards by locals as Black Friday.

== Sources ==
- Goerke-Shrode, Sabine (August 22, 2004), Capt. Ritchie battles for his land holdings, Vacaville Heritage Council and Solano County Historical Society
- Wright, E.W., ed. (1895). Lewis & Dryden's Marine History of the Pacific Northwest. Portland, Oregon: Lewis and Dryden Printing Co. LCCN 28001147.
- Reavis, L. U. (1875). Saint Louis: The Future Great City of the World (Biographical ed.). Saint Louis: Gray, Baker & Co. OCLC 1805694.
- San Francisco Streets Named for Pioneers, Museum of the City of San Francisco
- Sherman, WT. (1885), "V. Calilifornia 1855–1857", Memoirs of General W. T. Sherman, vol. 1 (2 ed.)
- "Suspension of Page, Bacon & Co.", Sacramento Daily Union, 8 (1223), February 23, 1855
- Tiemann, Jonathan (July 2018), Contagion 1855: How the Crimean War Felled San Francisco's Largest Banks (PDF), Tiemann Investment Advisors LLC
