= Daniel Page =

American politician (1790–1869)

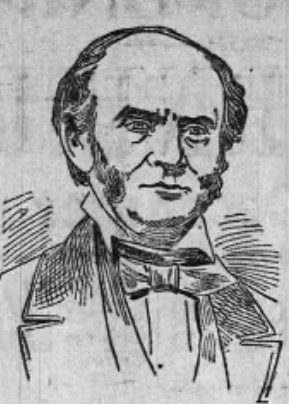

2nd Mayor of St. Louis, Missouri
- In office 1829–1833
- Preceded by: William Carr Lane
- Succeeded by: John W. Johnson

Personal details
- Born: March 5, 1790 Parsonsfield, Maine
- Died: April 29, 1869 (aged 79) Washington, D.C., U.S.
- Party: Whig
- Spouse: Deborah Page

Daniel D. Page (March 5, 1790 – April 29, 1869) was the second mayor of St. Louis, Missouri, United States.

Daniel Page was born in Parsonsfield, Maine, in 1790. At the age of fifteen, he moved to Portland, Maine, where he learned to be a baker, later setting up his own shop in Boston, Massachusetts. In Boston, he met and married Deborah Young. Shortly thereafter, he moved to New Orleans, Louisiana, and became established in the tobacco trading business. Despite his success, he moved to St. Louis, Missouri in 1818 due to his wife's failing health as she was adversely affected by the climate in New Orleans.

Page was elected the mayor of St. Louis in 1829 and went on to serve four consecutive one-year terms. He was only the second mayor of St. Louis, the first being William Carr Lane who stepped down after serving six years in office. During his administration, many of the streets in St. Louis were graded and paved, a night watch was established for the protection of the citizens, and street cleaning and refuse collection were begun. Page also strengthened the Health Department and advocated for an improvement to public waterworks system.

After his tenure as mayor had ended, Page turned his attention to his business matters. In 1833, he built the first steam-powered flour mill in St. Louis. In 1848, he partnered with his son-in-law Henry D. Bacon and created the banking house of Page & Bacon. During this time, he invested heavily in railroads and real estate. Page & Bacon closed in 1855 on account of financial difficulties from building of the Ohio and Mississippi Railroad.

Daniel Page died in Washington, D.C., on April 29, 1869, and was buried in Bellefontaine Cemetery in St. Louis. Page Boulevard in St. Louis was named in his honor.

Political offices
Preceded by William Carr Lane	Mayor of St. Louis, Missouri; 1829–1833	Succeeded by John W. Johnson
