= Bryan Mullanphy =

American politician (1809–1851)

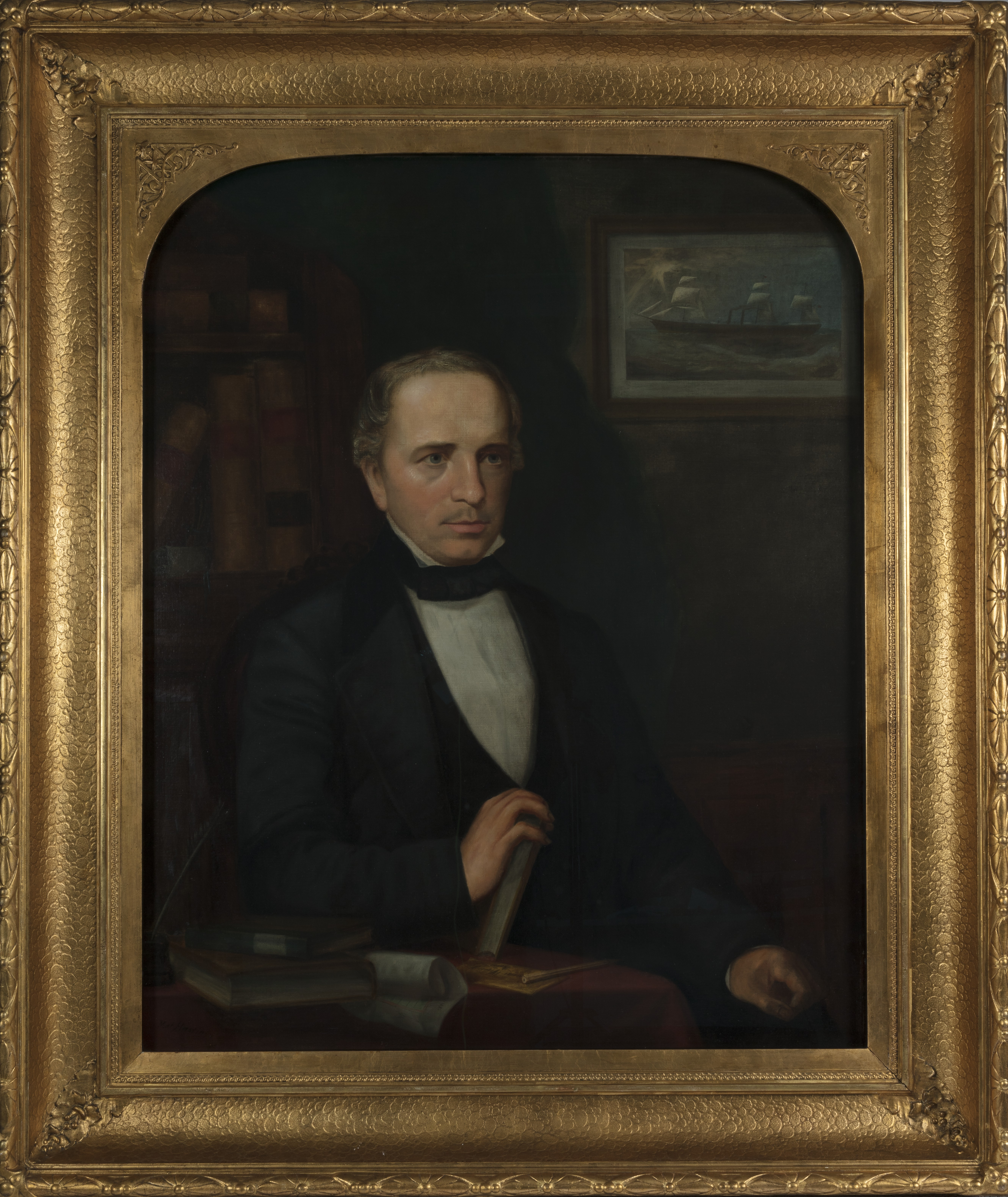

10th Mayor of St. Louis, Missouri
- In office April 13, 1847 – April 11, 1848
- Preceded by: Peter G. Camden
- Succeeded by: John Krum

Personal details
- Born: 1809 Baltimore, Maryland, US
- Died: June 15, 1851 (aged 41–42) St. Louis, Missouri, US
- Resting place: Calvary Cemetery
- Party: Democratic
- Parent: John Mullanphy (father)

Bryan Mullanphy (1809 – June 15, 1851) was the tenth mayor of St. Louis, serving from 1847 to 1848.

== Biography ==
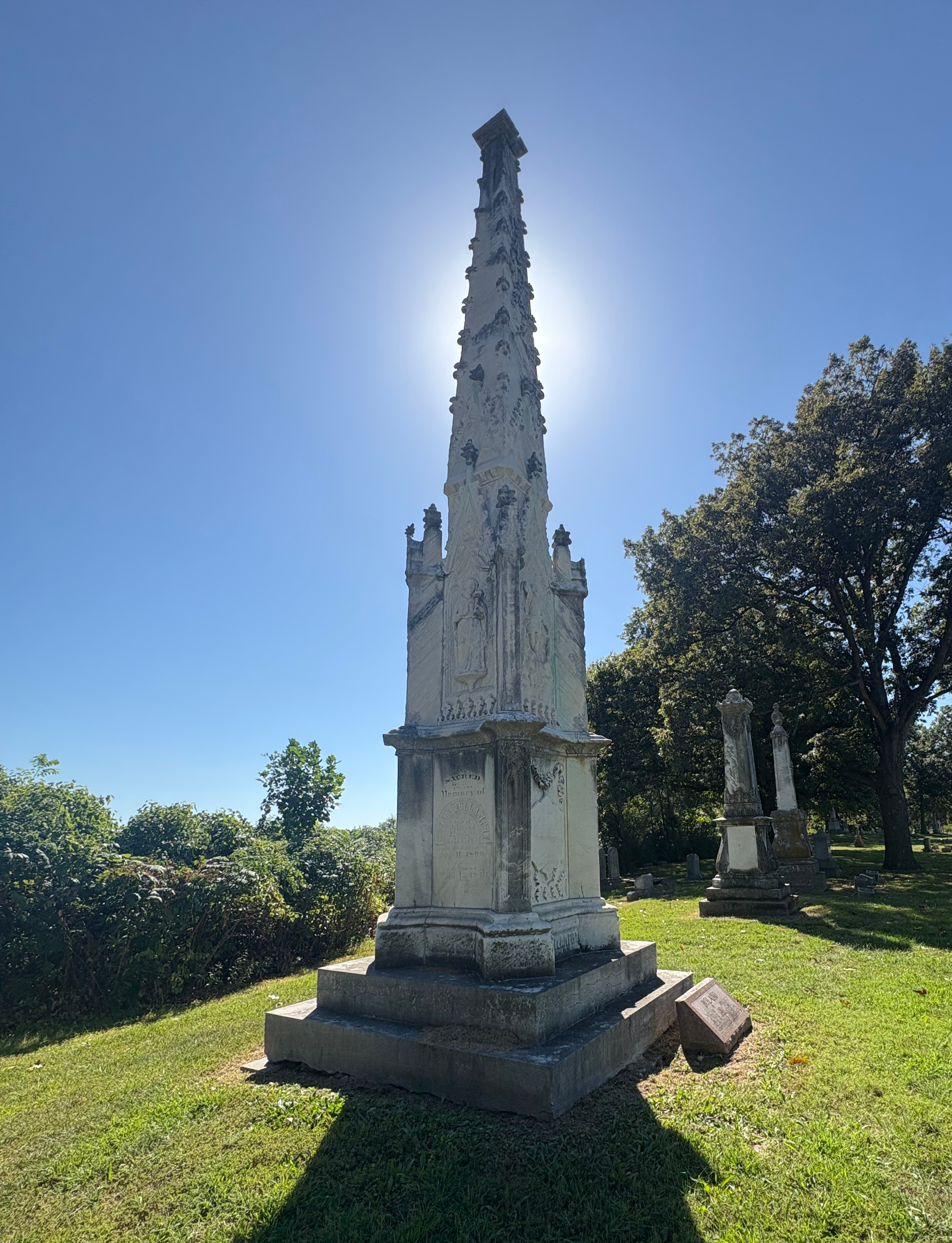
Mullanphy's grave at Calvary Cemetery

Bryan Mullanphy was born in Baltimore, the son of John Mullanphy, an Irish immigrant who became a wealthy merchant in St. Louis and in Baltimore. Bryan Mullanphy was born in Baltimore in 1809 and the family moved to St. Louis in 1819. His early education took place in England and France. After returning to the United States, he became a lawyer and practiced in St. Louis.

Mullanphy was a member of the St. Louis Board of Aldermen from 1835 to 1836; he was the only one in St. Louis who in 1836 protected the printing press of Elijah Lovejoy, when the police would not. He served as Judge of the St. Louis Circuit Court from 1840 to 1844. In 1847, running as an independent, he was elected to a one-year term as Mayor.

A collection of Native American artefacts that Mullanphy donated to Stonyhurst College (his alma mater) in England was purchased by the British Museum in 2003.

A wealthy man and a philanthropist, Mullanphy is remembered more for his charitable work than his political service. His will provided that one-third of his holdings were to go to the City via a trust fund for the relief of emigrants and travelers coming to St. Louis on their way to settle in the western part of the United States.

Mullanphy died in St. Louis on June 15, 1851, at the age of 42. He was buried at Calvary Cemetery.

== Sources ==
- Much of the original content for this article was based on from the St. Louis Public Library's website
