= Daniel G. Taylor =

American politician

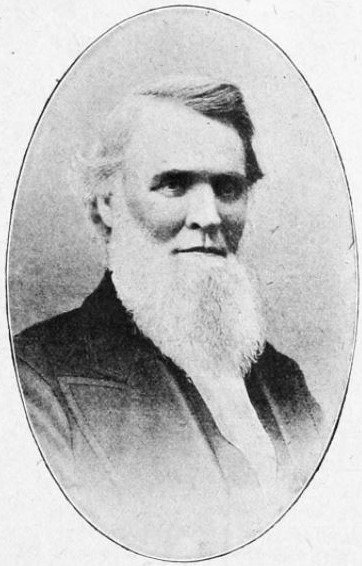

17th Mayor of St. Louis, Missouri
- In office 1861–1863
- Preceded by: Oliver Filley
- Succeeded by: Chauncey Filley

Personal details
- Born: November 15, 1819 Cincinnati, Ohio, US
- Died: October 8, 1878 (aged 58) St. Louis, Missouri, US
- Resting place: Calvary Cemetery
- Party: Union Anti-Black Republican

Daniel G. Taylor (November 15, 1819 – October 8, 1878) was the 17th mayor of St. Louis, Missouri, serving from 1861 to 1863.

== Early life ==
Taylor worked as a steamboat captain on the Ohio River and Mississippi River. In 1845, he head the steamer Clairmont across the Yellowstone River for a fur-trading expedition of Pierre Chouteau. Taylor founded the steamboat agency of Taylor & Hopkins. He was also head of the Boatmen's Insurance & Trust Company.

== Career ==
Taylor became a councilman for St. Louis between 1852 and 1855. Taylor became a Republican in opposition of secession of the Confederate States of America. He nevertheless held racist views like many of his constituents. Taylor did not support the GOP platform of abolitionism and emancipation. Thus, Taylor emerged behind the so-called "Union Anti-Black Republican." Taylor won the St. Louis mayoral election of April 1861, defeating John How. The "Union Anti-Black Republican" councilmen also won, except in the First and Second Wards. St. Louis experienced "increasing prosperity and continued happiness" at the time of the election of Taylor and his new Republican faction. Taylor, however, did not have time to congratulate the victories of the Union Anti-Black Republican party because of the tensions that arose due to the war. The St. Louis population experienced bitterness, as was seen in the political sentiment. A few individuals reduced to deplorable character and contributed to the increase in violence. Riots frequently broke out over the issues of secession and slavery. Murder became common in some cases. The new Republican mayor had positions that perplexed and embarrassed the populace in the midst of the prevailing excitement. St. Louis, nevertheless, remained a city of law and order. Taylor found the legality of the mass of citizens to be a source of no little self-congratulation. Missouri became a forefront in battles and violence. The mayor could not save the city from the devastation: factories closed, the steamboat interest was protracted, real estate depreciated, rents diminished, and construction halted. Taylor urged the Union and Confederacy "to interpose and restore the blessings of peace, order, and good government." Taylor was re-elected in 1862. Taylor appointed J. Gabriel Woerner to the presidency of the City Council.

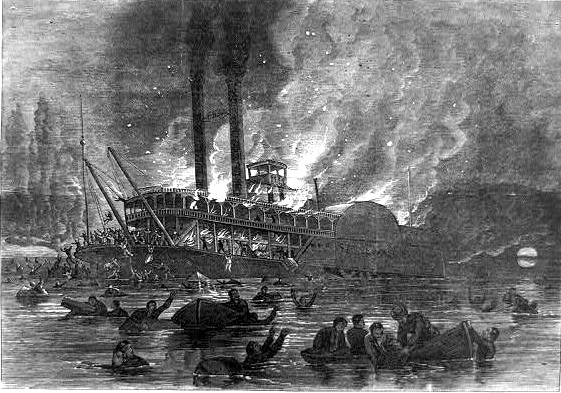
Burning of the steamer Stonewall, on the Mississippi, during which upward of two hundred people died

He led an expedition to recover bodies from the burning on 28 October 1869 of the steamer, Stonewall at Neely's Landing, Missouri, on the Mississippi.

After the Civil War, Taylor worked as treasurer from 1870 through 1872.

== Personal life ==
Taylor was considered a generous man and contributed to the success of young businessmen in St. Louis. He assisted in the well-being of wives of steamboat men, pilots, and entertainers. Taylor assisted a group of nuns in 1844 after their convent was flooded. On February 4, 1858, Taylor's wife died in the burning of the steamer, ‘’G. H. Crosman’’, outside of New Madrid, Missouri. One child survived, while the other died. His wife, despite wearing a life preserver, was found dead about fifty miles below the point where the steamer burned. Taylor toured Europe around 1859. Taylor was injured at the Gasconade disaster; he traveled to California to regain his health. Taylor successfully campaigned to establish the St. Louis Fire Department. He was a member of the Polar Star Lodge of Masons, No. 79, and the St. Louis Royal Arch Chapters, No. 8. Taylor spoke an admirable address as mayor in 1861 in regards to the savior of the municipal government from domination of military influence.

Taylor had two children with his first wife, Angelique Henri: Angelique and Sallie. His wife died in a riverboat explosion, and Sallie died in 1858. Taylor remarried to Emilie LeBeau in 1860, and had three children: Zoe Tracy, Grace V., and Daniel G. Sallie.f>

Taylor died in St. Louis on October 8, 1878, and was buried at Calvary Cemetery.

Political offices
Preceded by Oliver Filley	Mayor of St. Louis, Missouri; 1861–1863	Succeeded by Chauncey Filley
