= Henry Haight =

American businessman

- Born: 1820
- Died: 1869 (aged 48–49)
- Monuments: Haight Street
- Occupation(s): Exchange banker Manager of Page, Bacon & Co.

Henry Haight (c. 1820–1869) was an American exchange banker and pioneer. He was the manager of the Banking House of Page, Bacon & Co. in San Francisco during the California gold rush era.

He is the uncle of Henry Huntly Haight (1825–1878), tenth governor of California.

Haight Street, running from San Francisco's Golden Gate Park through the Haight-Ashbury to Market Street, is named in his honor.
