= John W. Johnston (mayor) =

American pioneer and politician (1774–1854)

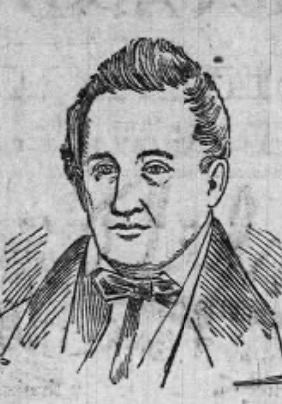

3rd Mayor of St. Louis, Missouri
- In office November 11, 1833 – April 14, 1835
- Preceded by: Daniel Page
- Succeeded by: John Fletcher Darby

Personal details
- Born: 1774 Maryland
- Died: June 1, 1854 (aged 79–80) St. Louis, Missouri, U.S.
- Resting place: Calvary Cemetery, St. Louis, Missouri
- Party: Whig
- Spouses: Tapissee Keokuk; (ended 1823); Lucia J. Hunnewell (m. 1831–1854)
- Children: 3 daughters (with Tapissee)

John W. Johnson (1774 – June 1, 1854) was an American pioneer, politician, and fur trader. He was the 3rd mayor of St. Louis, Missouri, serving from 1833 to 1835.

== Biography ==
Born in Maryland, Johnson came west in 1808, venturing into the vast Louisiana Territory recently acquired from Spain. He was commissioned by the federal government as an indian agent to trade with the Sauk and Fox (Meskwaki) people. He situated at a spot near the junction of the Des Moines and Mississippi rivers, at the site of what is now known as Keokuk, Iowa.

During this time he traveled extensively along the Mississippi as an indian agent and spent a great deal of time at Prairie du Chien, where he became involved with Tapissee, the daughter of the Sauk Chief Keokuk. At the end of the War of 1812, he supervised distribution of $30,000 in gifts from the United States to 19 Native American tribes, who signed the peace agreements at Portage Des Sioux, Missouri. At the organization of Crawford County within the Michigan Territory, in 1819, Johnston was designated chief justice of Crawford County—at Prairie du Chien.

In 1823, he moved south to St. Louis, in the new state of Missouri. Following a mayoral election in April 1833, the apparent winner, Dr. Samuel Merry, was ruled ineligible due to his concurrent holding of a U.S. federal office. A special election was held in November 1833, in which John Johnson was elected Mayor.

As mayor, he worked with the city's Board of Aldermen to update the election rules and procedures as a response to the controversy with Dr. Merry's election. He also won approval from the state legislature to amend the city charter to allow for redistricting the city wards to account for population growth. One of his final acts, in March 1835, was an ordinance on regulation of revenues and taxation in the city, establishing duties for the city assessor, collector, and register.

== Personal life ==
While working as indian agent at Prairie du Chien, Johnson married Tapissee, the daughter of the Sauk Chief Keokuk. They had at least three daughters together—Rosella, Mary, and Eliza. When Johnson left Prairie du Chien for St. Louis, he left Tapissee behind but brought their daughters with him.

In 1831, Johnson married Lucia (Lucy) J. Hunnewell, the widow of Captain George Gooding. Hunnewell assisted in raising Johnston's daughters and securing them status in St. Louis society.

=== Inheritance issue ===
Johnson had no children with Hunnewell and stipulated that much of his property should go to his half-Sauk daughters, including—after Hunnewell's death—their home. After his death in 1854, Hunnewell sued for a greater share of the inheritance, asserting that Johnson's half-Sauk daughters were not legitimate due to the undocumented nature of Johnson's relationship with Tapissee. A court initially ruled in the widow's favor, but the Supreme Court of Missouri, in the case of Johnson v. Johnson's Administrator, eventually ruled in favor of the daughters, stating that Johnson's lifelong care and devotion to the daughters was the most telling evidence of their legitimacy. Hunnewell, however, died before the case was settled.

Political offices
| Preceded by Daniel Page | Mayor of St. Louis, Missouri; November 11, 1833 – April 14, 1835 | Succeeded by John Fletcher Darby |
