= Peter G. Camden =

American politician (1801–1873)

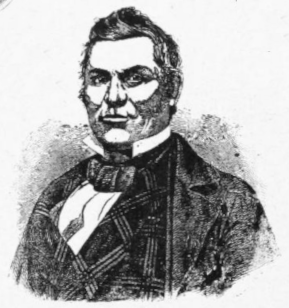
- Camden in a 1921 publication

9th Mayor of St. Louis
- In office 1846–1847
- Preceded by: Bernard Pratte
- Succeeded by: Bryan Mullanphy

Personal details
- Born: May 23, 1801 Amherst County, Virginia, US
- Died: July 23, 1873 (aged 72) Jennings, Missouri, US
- Resting place: Bellefontaine Cemetery
- Political party: American

Peter G. Camden (May 23, 1801 – July 23, 1873) was the ninth mayor of St. Louis, serving from 1846 to 1847. He was a member of the Know Nothing Party.

Camden was born in Amherst County, Virginia on May 23, 1801.

Cameen died in Jennings, Missouri on July 23, 1873, and is buried at Bellefontaine Cemetery, in St. Louis.

Preceded by Bernard Pratte	Mayor of St. Louis; 1846–1847	Succeeded by Bryan Mullanphy
