= Bernard Pratte =

American businessman and politician (1803–1886)

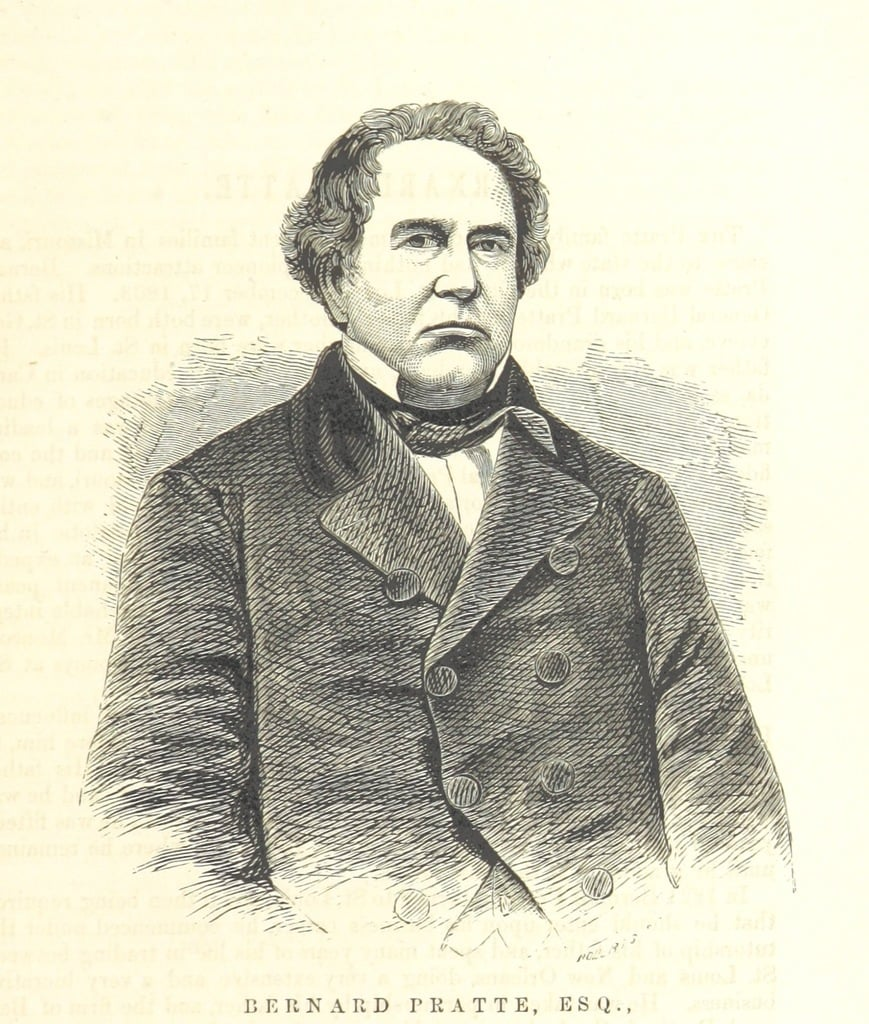
- c. 1860 portrait of Pratte

Member of the Missouri Senate from the St. Louis County district

8th Mayor of St. Louis
- In office April 1844–1846
- Preceded by: John Wimer
- Succeeded by: Peter G. Camden

Personal details
- Born: Bernard Pratte Jr. December 17, 1803 St. Louis, Missouri, US
- Died: August 10, 1886 (aged 82) Jonesburg, Missouri, US
- Party: Whig
- Relations: Bernard Pratte Sr. (father); Chouteau Family
- Profession: Businessman, politician

Bernard Pratte Jr. (December 17, 1803 – August 10, 1886) was an American businessman and politician. He served the eighth mayor of St. Louis, between 1844 and 1846.

== Early life and business career ==
Pratte was born on December 17, 1803, in St. Louis. He was the second son of General Bernard Pratte Sr. (1771–1836) and his wife, Emilie Sauver. Bernard Sr. was a fur trader and officer in the War of 1812, who was later appointed a judge in the Missouri Territory.

Pratte was the first person born in St. Louis after the Louisiana Purchase. Of French descent, he was a member of the Chouteau Family through his mother's side. Pratte attended St. Louis schools until age 15, when he was sent to Georgetown, Kentucky.

Pratte returned to St. Louis in 1821, and worked for his family's steamboat business, Bernard Pratte & Co. In 1832, he and Pierre Chouteau Jr. drove a steamboat through the Missouri River, to the mouth of to Yellowstone River, the first to do so. In 1833, Bernard Pratte & Co. was dissolved and succeeded by Mulligan & Pratte, which he worked as a steamboat operator for until 1838. In 1837, Pratt commanded the SS. St. Peter from St. Louis to Fort Union. A crewmember infected with smallpox and the failure to quarantine the steamboat resulted in the spread of the disease and the deaths of thousands of indigenous people along the Missouri River and the plains. In 1841, he and Jean Charles Cabanné founded a competitor to Chouteau's steamboat business, which by 1845, ran Choutea's business out of St. Louis. He served as director of the Bank of the State of Missouri some time after serving as mayor of St. Louis.

== Politics ==
A Whig, Pratte represented St. Louis County, Missouri in the Missouri Senate, from 1838 to an unknown date. He campaigned for mayor of St. Louis under the slogan "Henry Clay and Protection of American Industries". As mayor, he oversaw the implementation of gas-powered streetlights. He served as mayor during the Great Flood of 1844, which saw the displacement of 500 people. He signed an ordinance for flood relief on June 26. He also added stone pavement to the city's levee.

== Personal life and death ==
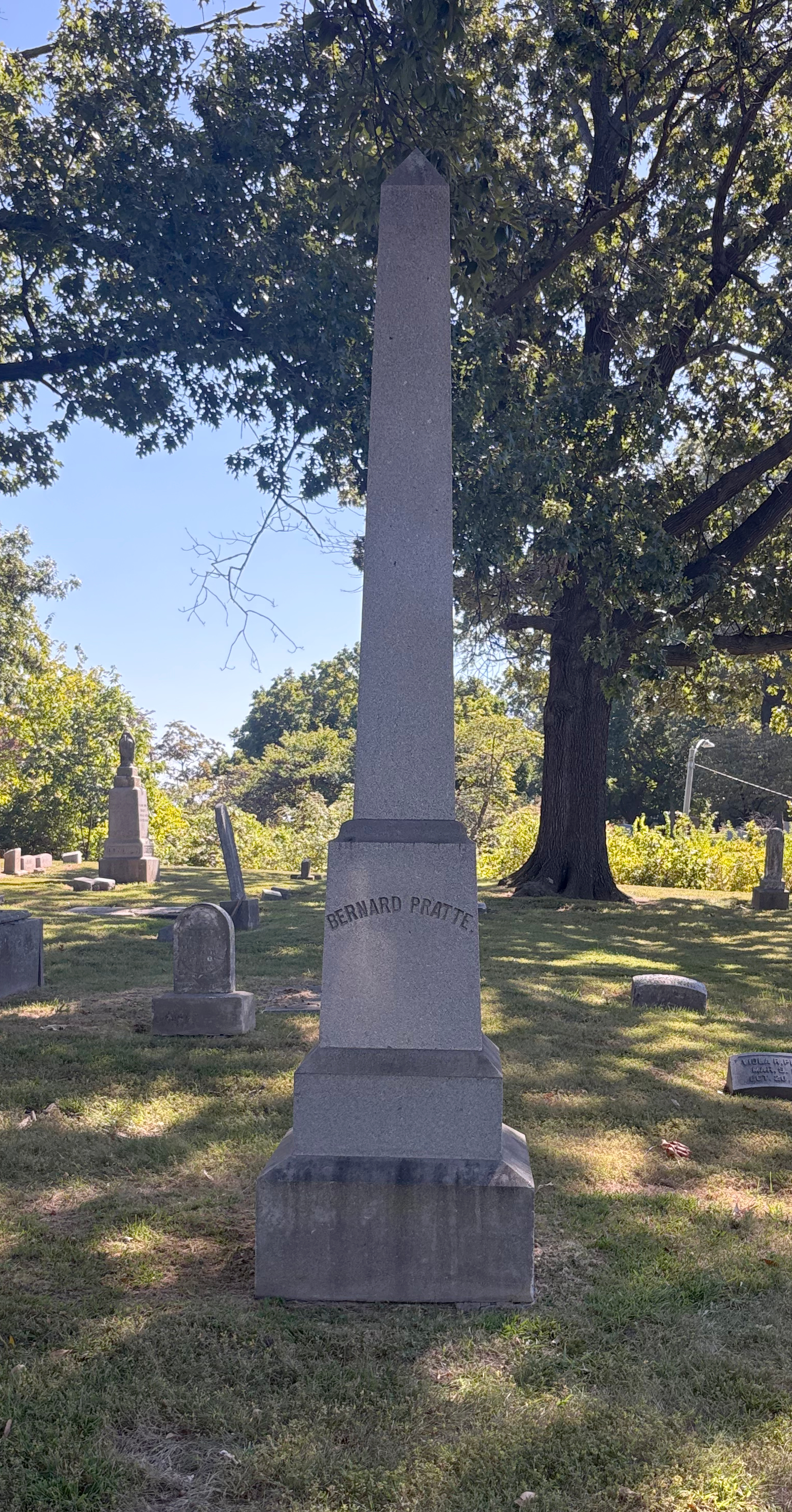
Pratte's tombstone, 2025

Pratte married Louise Chenie in 1824. In 1850, he retired and transferred ownership of his businesses to his eldest son, Bernard Pratte III, and moved onto a farm in Montgomery County, Missouri. He died on August 10, 1886, aged 82, in Jonesburg, Missouri.

== Bibliography ==
- "St. Louis Mayor: Bernard Pratte". St. Louis Public Library. Archived from the original on 2008-11-21.
- "St. Louis Historic Preservation: Pratte, Bernard". City of St. Louis.

Political offices
Preceded by John Wimer	Mayor of St. Louis, Missouri; 1844–1846	Succeeded by Peter G. Camden
