= William Carr Lane =

2nd Territorial Governor of New Mexico and Former Mayor of St. Louis

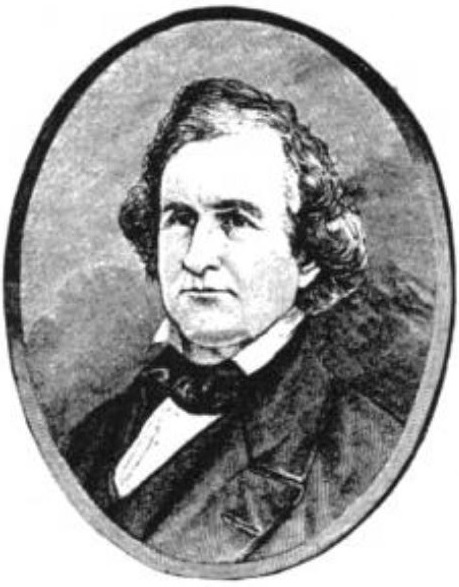
- Carr as depicted in Volume 1 of 1909's St. Louis, the Fourth City, 1764-1909.

2nd Governor of New Mexico Territory
- In office July 15, 1852 – May 6, 1853
- Appointed by: Millard Fillmore
- Preceded by: James S. Calhoun
- Succeeded by: David Meriwether

1st Mayor of St. Louis, Missouri
- In office April 14, 1823 – 1829
- Preceded by: Office Established
- Succeeded by: Daniel Page
- In office November 15, 1837 – 1840
- Preceded by: John Fletcher Darby
- Succeeded by: John Fletcher Darby

Personal details
- Born: December 1, 1789 Fayette County, Pennsylvania, U.S.
- Died: January 6, 1863 (aged 73) St. Louis, Missouri, U.S.
- Party: Whig
- Spouse: Mary Ewing
- Profession: Medical doctor

William Carr Lane (December 1, 1789 – January 6, 1863) was an American politician and medical doctor who was the first mayor of St. Louis, Missouri, from 1823 to 1829 and 1837 to 1840. He later served as the governor of New Mexico Territory from 1852 to 1853.

== Biography ==
Born in Fayette County, Pennsylvania, to Presley Carr Lane and Sarah Stephenson, Lane attended college in Pennsylvania and studied medicine in Louisville, Kentucky. He entered the U.S. Army, and was appointed post surgeon at Fort Harrison on the Wabash River north of Terre Haute, Indiana, in 1816. He resigned from the army in 1819 to enter private practice. He married on February 26, 1818, in Vincennes, Indiana, to Miss Mary Ewing, daughter of Nathaniel Ewing and Ann Breading. Their children were Anne Ewing Lane (1819–1904), Sarah L. Lane (1821–1887), and Victor Carr Lane (1831–1848).

Lane served as St. Louis's first mayor from 1823 to 1829, when the city's population was around 4,000. He oversaw the first public health system in the city, free public schools, and street improvements, including the paving of Main Street. Lane helped erect the city's first town hall. He was also instrumental in beautifying the city with fountains and greenery. The City Seal was adopted, and election procedures were written. Perhaps the most memorable event of his service was an 1825 visit by Lafayette. Lane served again as mayor from 1837 to 1840.

In 1852, President Millard Fillmore appointed him governor of the New Mexico Territory. During his tenure, Lane seized disputed land in the Mesilla Valley that he had no authority over. He sought to use the land as a route for the transcontinental railroad, but President Franklin Pierce did not approve of the seizure. Further tensions over the disputed land were eased when James Gadsden purchased it. After this service, Lane returned to St. Louis and practiced medicine until his death in 1863. He was buried at Bellefontaine Cemetery. A street in St. Louis is named in his honor.

Political offices
New title	Mayor of St. Louis, Missouri; 1823–1829	Succeeded by Daniel Page
Preceded by John Fletcher Darby	Mayor of St. Louis, Missouri; 1837–1840	Succeeded by John Fletcher Darby
Preceded by James S. Calhoun	Governor of New Mexico Territory; 1852–1853	Succeeded by David Meriwether
