= Pendleton, Missouri =

Coordinates: 38°49′38″N 91°14′07″W

- Village
- Interactive map of Pendleton, Missouri
- Country: United States
- State: Missouri
- County: Warren

Area
  - Total: 0.31 sq mi (0.79 km^{2})
  - Land: 0.31 sq mi (0.79 km^{2})
  - Water: 0 sq mi (0.00 km^{2})

Population (2020)
  - Total: 34
  - Density: 111.5/sq mi (43.04/km^{2})
- ZIP code: 63383
- FIPS code: 29-56882

Pendleton is an incorporated village in Warren County, Missouri, United States. As of the 2020 census, Pendleton had a population of 34.

== History ==
A post office called Pendleton was established in 1833, and remained in operation until 1951. J. W. Pendleton, an early postmaster, most likely gave the community his last name. Pendleton was platted in 1858 when the railroad was extended to that point.

== Geography ==
According to the United States Census Bureau, the village has a total area of 0.09 square miles (0.23 km^{2}), all land.

== Demographics ==
Historical population
Census	Pop.	Note	%±
2010	43		—
2020	34		−20.9%
U.S. Decennial Census

=== 2010 census ===
As of the census of 2010, there were 43 people, 14 households, and 11 families residing in the village. The population density was 477.8 inhabitants per square mile (184.5/km^{2}). There were 15 housing units at an average density of 166.7 per square mile (64.4/km^{2}). The racial makeup of the village was 100.0% White.

There were 14 households, of which 42.9% had children under the age of 18 living with them, 42.9% were married couples living together, 28.6% had a female householder with no husband present, 7.1% had a male householder with no wife present, and 21.4% were non-families. 21.4% of all households were made up of individuals. The average household size was 3.07 and the average family size was 3.64.

The median age in the village was 33.5 years. 30.2% of residents were under the age of 18; 9.4% were between the ages of 18 and 24; 21% were from 25 to 44; 35% were from 45 to 64; and 4.7% were 65 years of age or older. The gender makeup of the village was 48.8% male and 51.2% female.

== Education ==
It is in the Warren County R-III School District.
