= Washington King =

American politician (1815–1861)

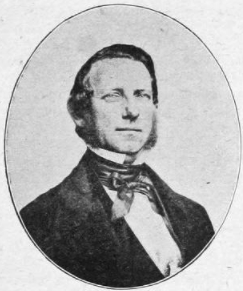

15th Mayor of St. Louis, Missouri
- In office 1855–1856
- Preceded by: John How
- Succeeded by: John How

Personal details
- Born: October 5, 1815 New York City, US
- Died: August 27, 1861 (aged 45) St. Louis, Missouri, US
- Party: Know Nothing

Washington King (October 5, 1815 – August 27, 1861) was the 15th mayor of St. Louis, Missouri, serving from 1855 to 1856.

King was a passenger on the Pacific Railroad excursion train that crashed through the temporary bridge over the Gasconade River on November 1, 1855. He was badly cut in the accident. Subsequently, he declared a day of mourning for the victims.

Political offices
Preceded by John How	Mayor of St. Louis, Missouri; 1855–1856	Succeeded by John How
