= Vincent C. Schoemehl =

American politician (born 1946)

Member of the Bi-State Development Agency Board of Commissioners
- Incumbent
- Assumed office August 2007
- Preceded by: Harvey Harris

42nd Mayor of St. Louis
- In office April 1981 – April 1993
- Preceded by: James F. Conway
- Succeeded by: Freeman Bosley Jr.

Personal details
- Born: October 30, 1946 (age 80) St. Louis, Missouri
- Party: Democratic
- Spouse: Lois
- Children: 2
- Education: University of Missouri

Vincent C. Schoemehl Jr. (born October 30, 1946, in St. Louis) was the 42nd mayor of St. Louis, Missouri, serving three terms from 1981 to 1993. At the time of his first election, he was one of the city's youngest mayors. In 1992, Schoemehl was defeated in the Democratic primary by lieutenant governor Mel Carnahan in a bid to become Governor of Missouri. He is best known as being primarily responsible for the NFL St. Louis Cardinals relocating to Phoenix, Arizona, and the expansion of Lambert Airport and the start of the eminent domain destruction of the Carrolton neighborhood in the name of noise abatement.

== Personal life ==
Born in St. Louis in 1946, Schoemehl received a degree in history from the University of Missouri-St. Louis in 1972. He and his wife, Lois, have two sons. Their son Tim Schoemehl made a run for Missouri State Representative District 64 in 2004.

== Political career ==
Schoemehl was elected to the City of St. Louis board of aldermen as a representative from the 28th ward for six years before being elected mayor in 1981. Schoemehl returned to public office in 2003, winning election as a member of the St. Louis School Board. He resigned from that position in November 2005. He recently retired from his post as president and CEO of Grand Center, Inc.

=== Real estate and development ===
Schoemehl is active in the areas of historic preservation and urban design. He helped save the Cupples Warehouses from demolition and promoted "public-private partnerships" that led to more than 600 rehabilitation projects. He also launched Operation Brightside, a City beautification program, and Operation Safestreet, a home safety program. In 1991, Schoemehl served as a committee member for the Rudy Bruner Award for Urban Excellence.

He has expressed regret for the 1980s destruction of downtown historic buildings and disruption of the Gateway Mall by the fifteen story office building now named after Peabody Energy. Opposition to the plan had been prominent, including historic preservationists relocating offices to one of the endangered buildings. CBS Radio vice president Robert Hyland described it as "an absolute aesthetic disaster." The destruction of "Real Estate Row" has been described as "one of the greatest tragedies in St. Louis architectural history."

Among the legacies of Schoemehl's tenure as mayor of St. Louis are numerous concrete street blockades nicknamed "Schoemehl pots."

==== Schoemehlville ====
Building demolitions and development leading to gentrification were among the causes for homelessness claimed by Reverend Larry Rice of the New Life Evangelistic Center when he constructed tent cities named "Schoemehlville" on the City Hall lawn. In several summers during the late 1980s and early 1990s, an estimated 100-150 people lived in the temporary tent cities to raise awareness around housing needs and to protest a lack of city support for homeless people. The encampments often coincided with the annual VP Fair, and in 1987 Rice brought a flock of sheep to City Hall to protest the city "pulling the wool" over the citizen's eyes.

=== Bi-State Development Agency ===
In July 2007, Matt Blunt nominated Schoemehl to be one of Missouri's five commissioners on the ten person board of commissioners for the Bi-State Development Agency which operates public-transit on both the Illinois and Missouri sides of the Greater St. Louis area. Schoemehl replaced Harvey Harris after the former's confirmation by the Missouri Senate.

=== Board of education ===
Schoemehl was elected to the St. Louis City Board of Education in a slate of candidates with significant financial backing from then mayor Francis Slay and several local corporations. The board's decision to hire a private firm to restructure the school district and close schools resulted in public protests, a lawsuit, and criticism from education reform scholars Jeff Henig and Amy Stuart Wells. Schoemehl compared dissenting parents of students to Nazis in a heated school board meeting, winning the title of 2003 "Best Villain" from the Riverfront Times.

== See also ==
- Timeline of St. Louis, 1980s-1990s

Preceded by James F. Conway	Mayor of St. Louis; 1981–1993	Succeeded by Freeman Bosley Jr.
