= James G. Barry =

American politician

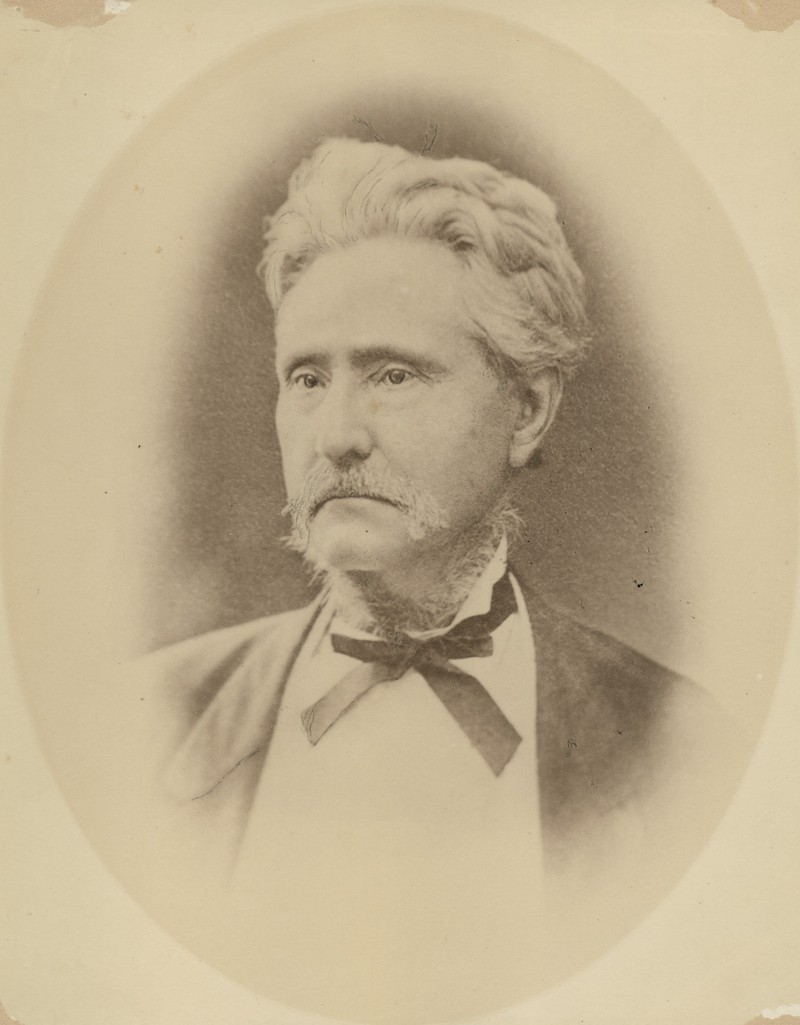
Photograph of James G. Barry

James G. Barry (1800– May 9, 1880) was the 12th mayor of St. Louis, Missouri. He served as a Democrat from 1849 to 1850. Though short-lived, Barry's time in office was highly respected.

== Childhood and Young Adulthood ==
Barry was born in 1800 in Ireland. Upon coming to the United States, Barry started his career as a real estate agent, primarily located in St. Louis. During this time, he served as a member on the Board of Aldermen, speckled in the years of 1840, 1842, 1845, and 1846.

In addition to before being elected, Barry served as the City Auditor in 1848–1849 under Mayor Krung.

Later in his life, he was recognized as a valued member of the Missouri Historical Society.

== Political career ==
Barry was elected in April 1849 as the mayor of St. Louis, for a term of one year.

Within a month of being elected, the Great Fire of 1849 in St. Louis occurred. On May 17, 1849, a small fire broke out and quickly spread, causing approximately five million dollars in damage. Beginning on one of the steamboats in the St. Louis embankment, it soon spread to destroying twenty-three boats and the majority of the business district. In order to combat this and help alleviate some of the hardships now faced, Barry authorized various new pieces of legislation. Some of these new laws allowed citizens to receive up to six thousand dollars for immediate relief and protection of their property. Others greatly effected the boats passing through the city, with all firewood requiring inspection before unloaded from the boat and ships with over 300 pounds of gunpowder refusing landing rights within the city.

Around the same time as the fire and following, cholera struck the city, killing as many as 639 in the first few weeks. At the beginning of 1849, St. Louis was a growing metropolitan area, with a population of 64,000 and many immigrants arriving every day. However, many of these new inhabitants had left their homeland sick, and brought the disease with them (if they survived the boat ride). In response, Barry created the Citizens Committee in effort to fight the plague. This committee was given the fifty thousand dollars from the City council and worked with Barry to establish strong quarantine regulations and other means of protection. Because of these two experiences, people respected him very highly, with the newspapers praising how he handled both disasters.

In addition, Barry worked to create a German newspaper printed in the German language. This was a result of an increase in the German immigrant population. This newspaper was delivered to all city ordinances.

== Quaker City Excursion with Mark Twain ==
In 1867 Barry traveled on the steamship Quaker City on a five month trip to Europe and the Holy Land, along with fellow passenger Mark Twain. Twain wrote his second book The Innocents Abroad about the journey. Although Barry isn't mentioned by name in the book, at least one story attributed to the fictional character Blucher in the book (riding a horse towards a mosque), was based on something that happened to Barry while he and Twain were visiting Tangier, based on a letter Twain wrote to his mother about the incident.

== Personal life ==
Barry married a woman named Elizabeth, and they had one child named Frances Angela. They lived in St. Louis for the full extent of Barry's life. Barry died on May 9, 1880. m He is buried in Calvary Cemetery.

== Sources ==
- St. Louis Mayors
