= George Maguire (politician) =

American politician (1796–1882)

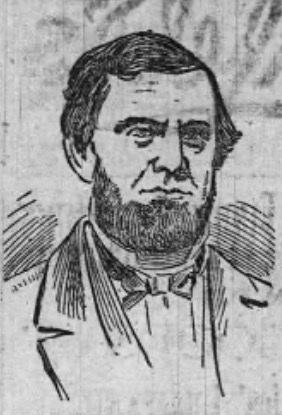

George Maguire (1796 in Omagh, Ireland – 1882), was the first foreign-born mayor and first Democrat to be elected mayor of St. Louis, Missouri (1842–1843). In 1833, he married Mary Amelia Provenchere, and they had one daughter. He died on October 22, 1882 in St. Louis City, Missouri.

== See also ==
- List of mayors of St. Louis
