= Crime in St. Louis =

Greater St. Louis
- Crime rates* (2018)

Violent crimes
- Homicide: 12.9
- Rape: 41.9
- Robbery: 93.3
- Aggravated assault: 307.1
- Total violent crime: 455.1

Property crimes
- Burglary: Not Reported
- Larceny-theft: 1,801.5
- Motor vehicle theft: Not Reported
- Total property crime: Not Reported
- Note: Reported crimes per 100,000 population Source: FBI 2018 UCR data ("Crime in the United States by Metropolitan Statistical Area, 2018" Table 6)

City of St. Louis
- Crime rates* (2024)

Violent crimes
- Homicide: 54.09
- Rape: 58.06
- Robbery: 249.55
- Aggravated assault: 1,005.43
- Total violent crime: 1,367.14

Property crimes
- Burglary: 819.71
- Larceny-theft: 3,412.26
- Motor vehicle theft: 1,474.97
- Total property crime: 5,930.9
- Note: Reported crimes per 100,000 population Source: FBI 2016 UCR data ("Crime in the United States by Metropolitan Statistical Area, 2016" Table 4)

Crime in St. Louis includes an overview of crime both in the city of St. Louis and in the Greater St. Louis metropolitan area. Crime in the city increased from the 1960s through the early 1990s as measured by the index crime rate. Despite decreasing crime, rates of violent crime and property crime in both the city and the metropolitan area remain higher than the national metropolitan area average. In addition, the city of St. Louis consistently has been ranked among the most dangerous cities in the United States. As of April 2017, St. Louis has the highest murder rate in America. At the end of 2017, St. Louis metropolitan had 205 murders, 159 of which were within the city limits. In 2018, the new Chief of Police, John Hayden said two-thirds (67%) of all the murders and one-half of all the assaults are concentrated in a triangular area in the north part of the city.

== Trends ==
Prior to the 1930s, only sporadic information is available regarding crime in the city and region. As early as 1894, there were 80 homicides in the city, according to the St. Louis Post-Dispatch. For the period 1901 to 1910, the city recorded 804 homicides, with a homicide rate for the period of 12 per 100,000 residents. In 1915, the city police reported 74 homicides, while 103 people were recorded as having died of homicide by the medical examiner. In 1921, there were 138 homicides in St. Louis according to the St. Louis city coroner, giving a rate of about 14 per 100,000 residents. After 1934, St. Louis reported crime statistics to the FBI, which compiled and published reports of index crime and homicides in the annual Uniform Crime Reports.

Starting in the 1950s, the city of St. Louis saw increases in its index crime and homicide rates, which both peaked in the early 1990s. However, St. Louis saw its peak number of index crimes and homicides in 1969 and 1970, respectively. Although some of the reduction in the number of index crimes since the early 1990s can be attributed to St. Louis's loss of population, other factors include low inflation, the decline of open-air drug markets, and a decline in crack cocaine use.

In 2009, 67 police departments in St. Louis County reported 33,718 index crimes, and three departments did not report crime to the FBI (these include the departments of Wellston, Normandy, and Lakeshire).

In 2010, the St. Louis Metropolitan Police Department (the city police department) reported 33,782 index crimes, which was the lowest total reported index crimes since 1967 (however, index crimes in 1967 did not include larceny under $50, arson, or non-negligent manslaughter). The index crime rate fell 9.2 percent from 2009, with a 15.6 percent decline in violent crime and a 7.6 percent decline in property crime. However, Chief of Police Daniel Isom noted in the report that both homicides and burglaries remain problems in the city.

Index crime and homicides in Greater St. Louis (2003–2016)
Year	Population	Estimated index crimes	Index crime rate	Estimated homicides	Homicide rate
1958	2,027,913	33,145	1,631.5	121	6.0
1959	2,040,134	33,467	1,610.4	146	7.2
2003	2,744,792	120,046	4,373.6	152	5.5
2004	2,758,612	113,907	4,129.1	205	7.4
2005	2,784,658	116,613	4,187.7	208	7.5
2006	2,798,956	120,281	4,297.4	185	6.6
2007	2,810,914	113,496	4,037.7	266	7.7
2008	2,820,831	110,742	3,925.9	233	8.3
2009	2,829,698	102,458	3,620.8	210	7.4
2010	2,822,879	103,228	3,656.8	219	7.8
2011	2,824,159	102,357	3,624.3	215	7.6
2012	2,798,017	93,605	3,345.4	203	7.3
2014	2,807,175	80,818	2,879.0	248	8.8
2015	2,811,161	84,861	3,018.7	295	10.5
2016	2,811,156	74,830 *	2,661.9	313	11.1

For 1958–1959, UCR data specified that Greater St. Louis included St. Louis, St. Charles, and Jefferson counties in Missouri, and Madison and St. Clair counties in Illinois.

Index crime and homicides in St. Louis County (2009)
Year	Population	Index crimes	Index crime rate	Homicides	Homicide rate
2009	989,966	33,718	3,406.0	36	3.6

Index crime and homicides in St. Louis City (1930–2016)
Year	Population	Index crimes	Index crime rate	Homicides	Homicide rate
1930	821,960			138	16.8
1931				131	15.8
1932				119	14.3
1933					
1934		14,805		101	
1935		14,434		72	
1936		14,715		72	
1937		13,987		59	
1938		12,819		55	
1939		13,302		80	
1940	816,048	12,702	1,556.5	55	6.7
1941		12,680		66	
1942		13,495		62	
1943		10,047		56	
1944		7,289		69	
1945		8,409		53	
1946		10,879		87	
1947		10,972		87	
1948		15,668		67	
1949		16,113		72	
1950	856,796	15,515	1,810.8	83	9.7
1951		17,816		64	
1952		19,794		101	
1953		21,967		96	
1954		27,357		77	
1955		30,223		94	
1956		34,698		95	
1957		37,559		92	
1958		41,007		107	
1959		37,121		129	
1960	750,026	38,810	5174.5	81	10.8
1961		35,557		92	
1962		42,787		92	
1963		48,763		138	
1964		54,824		160	
1965		53,530		182	
1966		50,940		153	
1967		56,316		217	
1968		66,837		244	
1969		76,594		297	
1970	622,236	71,437	11,480.7	309	49.7
1971	602,600	67,464	11,195.5	277	46.0
1972	579,600	65,140	11,238.8	250	43.1
1973	539,300	63,852	11,839.8	254	47.1
1974	530,800	66,400	12,509.4	227	42.8
1975	514,000	69,399	13,501.8	274	53.3
1976	505,300	62,747	12,417.8	224	44.3
1977	486,800	55,450	11,390.7	195	40.1
1978	470,900	54,485	11,570.4	210	44.6
1979	457,500	57,567	12,583.0	265	57.9
1980	450,790	65,081	14,437.1	225	49.9
1981	454,166	63,097	13,892.9	265	58.3
1982	455,362	60,500	13,286.1	226	49.6
1983	457,262	51,302	11,219.4	152	33.2
1984	442,528	47,628	10,762.7	128	28.9
1985	431,109	49,540	11,491.3	169	39.2
1986	434,298	51,721	11,909.1	195	44.9
1987	429,414	54,971	12,801.4	153	35.6
1988	425,187	57,215	13,456.4	140	32.9
1989	405,066	62,683	15,474.8	158	39.0
1990	396,685	58,886	14,844.5	177	44.6
1991	399,858	64,103	16,031.4	260	65.0
1992	402,573	59,579	14,799.6	231	57.4
1993	387,053	64,438	16,648.4	267	69.0
1994	390,437	63,839	16,350.7	248	63.5
1995	371,425	59,736	16,082.9	204	54.9
1996	374,041	56,588	15,128.8	166	44.4
1997	377,221	51,214	13,576.7	153	40.6
1998	344,153	51,459	14,952.4	113	32.8
1999	340,836	47,711	13,998.2	130	38.1
2000	348,189	50,653	14,547.6	124	35.6
2001	350,336	52,635	15,024.1	148	42.3
2002	353,004	50,429	14,285.7	111	31.4
2003	340,256	52,294	15,369.0	74	21.8
2004	335,143	45,761	13,654.2	113	33.7
2005	346,005	46,568	13,458.8	131	37.9
2006	346,879	49,312	14,215.9	129	37.2
2007	348,197	41,555	11,934.3	138	39.6
2008	356,204	37,826	10,619.2	167	46.9
2009	355,208	36,948	10,401.8	143	40.3
2010	355,151	33,529	10,580.2	144	45.1
2011	320,454	31,619	9,866.9	113	35.3
2012	318,667	27,656	8,678.7	113	35.5
2014	318,574	25,267	7,931.3	159	49.9
2015	317,095	26,013	8,203.5	188	59.3
2016	314,507	24,670	7,844.0	188	59.8

== 2011 and 2012 ==
In 2011, the St. Louis Metropolitan Police Department reported 113 homicides to the FBI, falling 21% from 2010, and producing a rate of 35.3 per 100,000 residents. In addition, the city reported 31,619 index crimes, a reduction of 5.7% from 2010, for a rate of 9,866.9 per 100,000. For the metropolitan area, the FBI estimated 102,357 index crimes took place in the region in 2011, a 0.8% decline from 2010, for a rate of 3,624.3 per 100,000. The FBI estimated 215 homicides took place in the region in 2011, a decline of 1.8% from 2010, for a rate of 7.6 per 100,000.

For 2012, preliminary crime data released by the St. Louis Metropolitan Police Department showed a decline of 12.4% in crime, with the overall crime rate lower than it was in 1970. St. Louis reported 113 homicides, the same as 2011, while it reported a decline in both violent and property crimes from 2011. Violent crimes declined 4.9%, including a 16.5% decline in robberies to 1,777 the lowest since 1953, while property crime declined 14.2%, with a 28.9% decline in burglaries. Rape was up 5.9%, and vehicle thefts were up 3.6% in 2012. At the end of 2017, St. Louis had 205 murders, up 9% from 2016.

== Policing ==
Law enforcement in the metropolitan area is provided by a variety of municipal and county police departments and by federal agencies. In the city of St. Louis, the St. Louis Metropolitan Police Department provides police service, while the city sheriff's department provides courtroom protection services, serves eviction notices, and transports prisoners between courts and jails within the city. In St. Louis County, 67 police departments, including the St. Louis County Police Department, provide police services, while the county also maintains a sheriff's office for courtroom services and civil actions. Nearby counties such as St. Charles County have both municipal police departments and a county-wide sheriff that provide police services. The Missouri State Highway Patrol maintains a troop servicing the region with its headquarters in St. Charles County. An FBI field office is located in the city of St. Louis, while the Bureau of Alcohol, Tobacco, Firearms, and Explosives maintains a group supervisor office in the city under the direction of the Kansas City Field Division.

In 1994, Morgan Quitno (a private research and publishing company purchased by CQ Press in 2007) began publishing reports that named St. Louis City among the "most dangerous" cities in the United States. Although the methodology for the reports changed during the 1990s, St. Louis retained its ranking in the top ten most dangerous cities, and it was named the most dangerous city in the United States three times, most recently in 2010.

"Most Dangerous" ranking of St. Louis (1994–2012)
Year	1994	1995	1996	1997	1998	1999	2000	2001	2002	2003	2004	2005	2006	2007	2008	2009	2010	2011	2012
Ranking	2	3	3	8	5	5	3	3	3	1	2	4	3	1	4	2	1	?	4

For the two years that it was ranked by CQ Press (in 2008 and 2009), the City of St. Louis alone ranked considerably more dangerous than the St. Louis metropolitan statistical area.

St. Louis's ranking has not been without controversy; University of Missouri–St. Louis professors and criminologists Richard Rosenfeld and Janet Lauritsen criticized the rankings for their lack of transparency and their over-reliance on Uniform Crime Reports as data sources. They argue that the rankings are not meaningful indicators of risk of victimization, as certain factors such as age, lifestyle, and neighborhood play a significant role in crime risk.

Upon St. Louis's ranking as most dangerous city in 2010, the administration of Washington University in St. Louis criticized the rankings as flawed, and representatives for St. Louis Mayor Francis G. Slay noted that crime in the city decreased each year since 2007 and criticized the report for not including regional crime information.

In 2014, St. Louis was ranked as the 19th most dangerous city in the world by the Mexican aid organization CCSP-JP (El Consejo Ciudadano para la Seguridad Publica y la Justicia Penal).

As of 2017, St. Louis is ranked as the most dangerous city in America. There were 66 homicides per 100,000 residents. This rate is more than 10 times the national homicide rate.

== See also ==
- Alcohol laws of Missouri
- Crime in Missouri
- Loren and Dora Doxey, accused of murder by arsenic
- United States cities by crime rate
