= Kimberly Gardner =

American prosecutor

Kim Gardner

Circuit Attorney of St. Louis
- In office January 1, 2017 – May 16, 2023
- Preceded by: Jennifer Joyce
- Succeeded by: Gabe Gore

Member of the Missouri House of Representatives from the 77th district
- In office January 9, 2013 – January 1, 2017
- Preceded by: Eileen Grant McGeoghegan
- Succeeded by: Steve Roberts

Personal details
- Born: 1975 (age 50–51) St. Louis, Missouri, U.S.
- Party: Democratic
- Education: Harris-Stowe State University (BS); Saint Louis University (JD, MS)

Kimberly M. Gardner (born August 2, 1975) is an American politician and attorney from the state of Missouri. She was the circuit attorney for the city of St. Louis, Missouri. She previously served as a member of the Missouri House of Representatives.

In February 2023, Missouri Attorney General Andrew Bailey requested that Gardner resign after a serial criminal who had violated house arrest 51 times caused a teenage girl to lose both of her legs. In July 2022, the suspect in question had been in court, ready to be tried as a suspect of an armed robbery that had happened in 2020, but Gardner's office was not prepared for the trial, so Gardner's staff dismissed the charges and refiled them the same day. After the incident, several members of the Board of Aldermen also asked for Gardner to resign, and St. Louis Mayor Tishaura Jones stated that Gardner "needs to do some soul searching on whether or not she wants to continue with circuit attorney because she's lost the trust of the people".

On May 4, 2023, Gardner officially resigned as Circuit Attorney of St. Louis. She announced her resignation would be effective June 1, but ended up stepping down early on May 16.

== Early life and education ==
Gardner was born in 1975 and raised in St. Louis, Missouri. Her family runs a funeral home in North St. Louis, at which she also worked. She earned a Bachelor of Science degree in healthcare administration from Harris–Stowe State University in 1999. She then earned a Juris Doctor from the Saint Louis University School of Law in 2003 and a Master of Science in nursing from Saint Louis University in 2012.

== Career ==
=== Pre-public life and State Rep. ===
Gardner worked at Bell, Kirksey & Associates, a law firm, and as an assistant prosecutor (St. Louis Circuit Attorney's Office, 2005–2010) prior to being elected as Circuit Attorney. From 2013 to 2017 she was a Missouri State Representative for District 77.

=== Circuit attorney ===
Gardner took office on January 6, 2017. She is the first African-American to head the Circuit Attorney's Office. In 2019, St. Louis police sought 7,045 felony cases, but only 1,641 were prosecuted by Gardner's office. Many were returned to the police citing insufficient evidence, despite claims of sufficient evidence to prosecute by the police union.

Gardner continued the prosecution of former St. Louis Metropolitan Police Department police officer Jason Stockley for first degree murder in the shooting of Anthony Lamar Smith, a case first filed by her predecessor Jennifer Joyce. The acquittal in the bench trial in a decision by Judge Timothy Wilson led to intense protests in the latter months of 2017.

As Circuit Attorney, Gardner removed or reduced the amount of cash required for bonds for minor, nonviolent offenses. She also expanded diversion and drug court programs, and consulted with the Vera Institute of Justice on these issues. She promised to end prosecutions of low-level marijuana possession and dismiss many such cases. During Gardner's tenure, the CAO shared a federal grant to work with the Midwest Innocence Project on wrongful convictions.

==== Staff turnover and shortage ====
The Circuit Attorney's Office experienced a more than 100% turnover rate in staff since Gardner took office. The St. Louis Post-Dispatch reported in September 2019 that "over 65 attorneys with a combined experience of over 460 years in prosecutorial experience" have left the Circuit Attorney's office under Gardner.

==== Grand jury process ====
Kim Gardner's office charged defendants under direct complaint and then used the grand jury process to delay the preliminary hearing. The average wait was 344 days as of March 2021. The Missouri Supreme Court changed the rules on preliminary hearings effective March 1, 2021, to that "courts must hold preliminary hearings within 30 days of felony complaints being filed if a defendant is in jail, and within 60 days if not". Kim Gardner's continued use of the grand jury process circumvented the Supreme Court's attempt at reform.

== Controversies ==
=== Eric Greitens investigation and indictment ===
Kim Gardner's office secured a grand jury indictment of sitting Missouri Governor Eric Greitens in February 2018, for felony invasion of privacy. On April 20, 2018, Gardner's office announced a new charge of tampering with computer data against Greitens. Then Missouri Attorney General Josh Hawley had the opportunity to prosecute but declined to do so. In May 2018, the judge in the Greitens case ruled that the defense could call Gardner as a witness due to suspected criminal conduct by the prosecution. Following the judge's ruling, Gardner's office announced that they would be dismissing the invasion of privacy charge, citing that Gardner could not testify in a case her office was prosecuting. Following Greitens' announcement that he planned to resign as Governor, Gardner announced that all charges against Greitens would be dropped.

On May 15, 2018, Greitens' attorneys filed a police report with the St. Louis Metropolitan Police Department alleging perjury by William Don Tisaby, an ex-FBI agent and private investigator that Gardner hired to investigate Greitens. Defense attorneys also cited $100,000 in secret cash payments to witnesses, payments they stated were concealed from the defense team by Gardner, as well as numerous meetings between the Circuit Attorney and William Tisaby, and "a major witness in the case". In a statement regarding the police report, defense attorneys said that, "By law, both the Circuit Attorney and William Tisaby were required to testify about what was said and done in those secret meetings. Both refused to do so." Tisaby asserted his Fifth Amendment rights against self-incrimination in response to over 50 questions.

==== Special prosecutor investigation ====
On June 29, 2018, St. Louis Circuit Judge Michael Mullen appointed St. Louis attorney Gerard Carmody as special prosecutor to investigate allegations of criminal misconduct in the case against Governor Eric Greitens. Gardner appealed the appointment of a special prosecutor to the Missouri Supreme Court, which ruled that Gardner had a conflict of interest in the case and upheld Mullen's appointment of Carmody. The Missouri Supreme Court also rejected an appeal from Gardner's office seeking to block a search warrant signed by Mullen for the files of Gardner's office; the court ordered Gardner to turn over servers requested by Carmody.

On June 17, 2019, a 30-page grand jury indictment was unsealed against William Don Tisaby, the private investigator hired by Gardner to investigate Greitens, charging him with six counts of felony perjury and one count of felony tampering with evidence. The indictment alleges that Tisaby lied under oath about "matters that could substantially affect, or did substantially affect, the course or outcome of the Greitens case" (specifically, about his contacts with a major witness in the case and the nature of those conversations) and had concealed documents from defense attorneys. Tisaby pleaded not guilty. In June 2019, Tisaby's attorney told reporters that "Ms. Gardner is probably the actual target here, not Mr. Tisaby." Although Gardner was not indicted, the indictment against Tisaby stated that Gardner "failed to correct Tisaby's lies, failed to report them to police, and made incorrect statements to defense lawyers and the judge".

On July 10, 2019, the grand jury disbanded without charging Gardner. The next day, Gardner held a press conference denying any wrongdoing in Greitens's case (her first public statement on the matter since the appointment of the special prosecutor, as a gag order had been placed on the case for the duration of the grand jury) and saying it was time for the city to "move on".

Following the press conference, special prosecutor Carmody took the unusual step of putting out a statement clarifying that the grand jury disbanded because its term expired, not because the investigation was complete. Carmody announced that despite the original grand jury's conclusion, his investigation would continue, pointing out his authority to seat a new grand jury to review any evidence relating to Gardner's conduct.

Tisaby's motion to dismiss the indictment against him was denied by St. Louis Circuit Judge Bryan Hettenbach, who also placed a protective order on approximately 4,000 documents at Carmody's request to protect the privacy of some parties involved in the Greitens case and the integrity of "an active criminal investigation" focused on the failed prosecution of Greitens.

On July 2, 2021, Judge Bryan Hettenbach approved Carmody's withdrawal from the case and appointed Johnson County prosecutor Robert Russell to the case. The court ordered the city of St. Louis to pay Russell's expenses. Judge Bryan Hettenbach also denied Tisaby's attorneys' motion to dismiss the case and the sanctioning of Carmody for allegedly not providing transcripts.

On March 23, 2022, Tisaby pled guilty to misdemeanor evidence tampering and he was ordered to spend a year on probation. Tisaby admitted to failing to give Greiten's lawyers documents including his notes during an interview with the women involved in the case. His attorney, Jermaine Wooten, stated that Tisaby pled guilty after taking his health into account, the attorney stating he was not sure Tisaby could withstand a full jury trial.

==== Misconduct Probe ====
It was published on May 4, 2021, that the Missouri's State Disciplinary Counsel found probable cause that during the Greitens prosecution, Gardner committed professional misconduct. Gardner will face a disciplinary panel and any possible punishment will be decided by the Missouri Supreme Court which could range from admonishment to the suspension or revocation of her law license. An expert on prosecutorial misconduct, Professor Bennett Gershman, described the case as "startling" and an unusual invocation of Brady v. Maryland, on which the record focuses.

On April 11, 2022, Gardner's disciplinary hearing was heard. Gardner admitted to wrongdoing during the hearing and agreed to a 40-page stipulation that stated how notes and a recording were not given to Greiten's defense team. The stipulation recommends to reprimand Gardner which will go on her license forever. Gardner claimed during the hearing that the St. Louis Police Department refused to "step in" to investigate the claims, a claim Chief John Hayden Jr. has repeatedly denied. The three person ethics panel will have 30 days to decide whether to accept the agreement and then the Missouri Supreme Court will have the final say on whether to punish Gardner and what the punishment will be if any.

=== Exclusion list ===
In summer 2018, a spokesperson for the CAO announced the existence of an "exclusion list" (similar to a "Brady list" in other jurisdictions) of 28 SLMPD officers whose conduct is considered so tainted by misconduct that the CAO would no longer accept testimony or evidence in court cases and would reconsider past cases. Fifty-five prosecutors and law enforcement officials from across the United States signed a statement supporting Gardner's Brady List. Gardner, in February 2019, announced that the CAO and police department are working together on problems stemming from the list. In January 2019, Gardner's office accused officers within SLMPD of obstructing their investigation in the shooting death of officer Katlyn Alix by officer Nathaniel R. Hendren, one of two officers charged with crimes relating to the incident, which resulted in a sharp rebuke by Chief John Hayden.

=== Traffic stop controversy ===
On December 23, 2019 (the day before Christmas Eve), Kim Gardner was pulled over by St. Louis Metropolitan Police officers on Market Street for a traffic violation. In January 2020, Gardner made numerous news interviews and public claims stating that: the stop was on December 24, 2019 (Christmas Eve), police had held her for 15 minutes without stating why, and that these were "intimidation tactics used by the police to stop reform". Police records state that the stop occurred on December 23, 2019, instead. KMOV4 news also published video evidence from a camera across the street revealing that St. Louis police officers had pulled Gardner over when her car was shown driving without headlights, and that the stop lasted for only 6 minutes. Gardner continued to claim that the stop lasted 15 minutes and was without reason. The Circuit Attorney's Office also sent an email statement that "According to the police it was a 15 minute stop. In addition, the officer's statement is different than the one shared by Jeff Roorda." The SLMPD then issued a follow-up statement that the police had never stated Gardner was detained for 15 minutes. The statement also reveals that an investigator from the Circuit Attorney's Office had attempted to involve himself into the traffic investigation, which is an illegal act and the investigator could have been arrested for it. The investigator was not arrested. The Circuit Attorney's Office continued to assert Gardner's false allegations.

=== Campaign finance violations ===
In 2019, Gardner admitted to repeated campaign finance violations dating back to her time as a Missouri state legislator. These violations included using campaign donations to pay for a private apartment. Gardner reached an agreement with the Missouri Ethics Commission to pay a settlement of $6,314 in lieu of a $63,009 fine.

=== Civil rights lawsuit ===
In January 2020, Gardner filed a civil rights lawsuit against St. Louis City and St. Louis Metropolitan Police Department on the basis of the Fourth Amendment, Fourteenth Amendment, and Ku Klux Klan Act of 1865, alleging a racist conspiracy. The lawsuit cites a 2016 report from the Ethical Society of Police detailing a history of racial discrimination in the police force, as well as the Plain View Project's report exposing city police officers' racist social media activities.

The city and the St. Louis Police Officers Association, led by Jeff Roorda, denied the lawsuit's allegations. Several African American women district attorneys, including Marilyn Mosby and Aramis Ayala, traveled to St. Louis to demonstrate support for Gardner, declaring that she has been targeted by a "fundamentally racist" system which they also contend against.

On September 30, 2020, U.S. District Judge John Andrew Ross dismissed Gardner's lawsuit. The judge wrote that: "Her 32-page complaint can best be described as a conglomeration of unrelated claims and conclusory statements supported by very few facts, which do not plead any recognizable cause of action" and continued that "Gardner presents no specific material facts, circumstantial or otherwise, to show that defendants acted with each other for the purpose of depriving her – or anyone else – of a constitutional right to equal protection. Her complaint is nothing more than a compilation of personal slights – none of which rise to a legal cause of action." Judge Ross is a federal judge for the United States District Court for the Eastern District of Missouri. He was nominated by President Barack Obama in December 2010. Prior to becoming a federal judge, Ross was a circuit court judge for the 21st Circuit Court in Missouri. The costs to defend her out of taxpayer funds has been widely discussed. Invoices and receipts obtained by the Post-Dispatch show the city in June approved and paid the Brown & James firm about $153,600 in legal bills to defend the Circuit Attorney's Office against two lawsuits. The city paid about 80% of those bills three weeks after Circuit Judge Joan Moriarty blocked payments to at least five other private firms.

=== Open records lawsuit ===
In January 2020, Fox News contributor and political commentator John Solomon sued Gardner and several others—including former State Representatives Jay Barnes and Stacey Newman, billionaire political donor George Soros, and individuals connected to the state's low income housing tax credit industry—in the St. Louis Circuit Court, alleging violations of Missouri's open records laws. Solomon claimed that Gardner's office violated the state's "Sunshine Law" by refusing to make available records involving investigations into former Republican Missouri Governor Eric Greitens. Gardner hired a local private law firm to represent her in the case while Solomon was represented by Dave Roland, president of the Freedom Center of Missouri.

In November 2020, Christopher McGraugh, the circuit judge in the case, wrote that Gardner's "conduct in this case has recklessly impeded the judicial process". He determined that Gardner purposely violated the law and ordered Gardner to produce the records requested within 30 days and fined Gardner's office $5,000. Gardner's team tried to get the case dismissed claiming that they never received the request.

In January 2022, the Court of Appeals ruled to uphold McGraugh's ruling. The Court of Appeals wrote: "(Gardner's) failure to file a timely response to (Solomon's) amended petition was not the result of an unexpected or unavoidable hindrance, accident or mishap, but was instead the result of defendant's careless inattention and deliberate disregard." The Appeals Court also ruled that McGraugh would determine how much Gardner's office would have to pay for attorney fees. Gardner's office intends to have the decision reviewed.

In April 2022, the Missouri Supreme Court declined to hear Gardner's appeal.

=== McCloskey prosecution ===
In June 2020, 36 people were arrested in St. Louis during two nights of the George Floyd protests for alleged trespassing, burglary, property damage, assault, and theft. All were released, two after being issued summons, eight after prosecutors declined to immediately file a charge, and the rest "while police apply for charges". Missouri Attorney General Eric Schmitt, a Republican, criticized Gardner on Twitter over the arrestees' release. Gardner said she would bring "the full power of the law" against those responsible for violent acts, but, responding to Schmitt, said that the prosecutor's office cannot bring charges against individuals without admissible evidence from police. Gardner criticized Schmitt for launching "a politically motivated attack against me, even if it means misleading and lying to the public."

In December 2020, a judge disqualified Gardner from prosecuting the case against Mark McCloskey, writing that "the Circuit Attorney's conduct raises the appearance that she initiated a criminal prosecution for political purposes".

=== Dropped charges controversy ===
On July 16, 2021, charges in a murder case were dropped due to the prosecutor not showing up to multiple hearings in the case. The judge in the case said that Gardner's office "essentially abandoned its duty to prosecute those it charges with crimes." Kim Gardner declared in a press briefing that the charges had been refiled and the suspect was in custody, although he was not. The family of the man who was killed claimed they were not contacted when the defendant was released, which violates state laws. On July 20, Gardner's office finally contacted the family about the case and apologized to the family. The prosecutor assigned to the case, who had been on maternity leave and whose signature was forged on at least 20 cases, quit after learning this information. Gardner blamed the mistake on the office's internal policy and procedures on Family and Medical Leave. The dismissal rate of cases since Gardner has taken office has doubled and is double the rate of surrounding counties.

In another case, one of Gardner's prosecutors entered in a plea deal with the defendant without telling the family of the victim, which violates state law. The mother learned of this update when she called Gardner's office to know when she should fly up to see the case. The mother claims the first prosecutor was not going to accept the deal and was going to prosecute the case. The mother wrote letters to the judge in the case not to accept the plea deal and claims Gardner and two of her associates called her to bully her into accepting the deal.

On January 12, 2022, Gardner's office was forced to drop charges against an alleged car bomber due to violating his rights to a speedy trial. He was charged with arson, endangering the welfare of a child, unlawful possession of a weapon, and property damage. At the time he was serving a five-year sentence for federal charges of failure to register an explosive device that was used in the bombing. In May 2021 the man requested a speedy trial for the state charges and Gardner's office failed to meet the 180 day deadline to either bring the man to trial or object. On December 9, 2021, Gardner's office filed a motion alleging that the motion for a speedy trial was not filed properly. The assistant circuit attorney in the case stated charges would likely not be refiled and could not explain to the victim why.

On April 13, 2022, St. Louis judge Michael Noble dismissed murder charges against two women who were among those accused of killing Jerome Boyd Jr. in April 2018. The judge dismissed the case since Gardner's office failed for months to provide reports to the defense after multiple court orders to do so. One of these reports included one of the defendants statements to a federal agent.

=== Racial discrimination allegations ===
In January 2023, it was reported that Gardner was being sued, as well as the city and two other city employees, for racial discrimination and retaliation. The employee suing was a diversion specialist who worked with young defendants to help get their charges dropped. During a meeting in May 2022 with Gardner, the employee was called a slave owner by a contract employee because the employee was tracking fines participants owed. According to the employee, Gardner did not say anything to the contract employee and walked out of the meeting. The employee was put on administrative leave after texting another employee about the meeting and how she was discriminated against. The contract employee is currently serving a sentence for first degree murder.

=== Nursing School Enrollment ===
In May 2023, Missouri Attorney General Andrew Bailey accused Gardner of breaking Missouri law by being enrolled in a graduate nursing degree program at St. Louis University. The AG subpoenaed records from the university's School of Nursing related to Gardner's attendance, to ascertain if she was complying with the law that requires her to "devote her full time and energy" to her job as the Circuit Attorney.

=== Misuse of Funds ===
In August 2022, the Missouri Supreme Court levied costs against Gardner associated with their investigation into her conduct. Gardner was also fined $750 for ethical violations relating to the prosecution of former Governor Eric Greitens. To pay the costs, Gardner ordered office members to reimburse her out of the Contingent Fund, sanctioned by Missouri Revised Statutes to reimburse Circuit Attorneys for costs associated with their duties. Reimbursement through this fund totaled $5,004.33.

Gardner was accused of misappropriation of funds by the U.S. Attorney's Office, given her use of the funds was unsanctioned by state law. On October 23, 2024, the U.S. Attorney's Office for the Eastern District of Missouri announced a pretrial diversion agreement whereby Gardner formally admits to the misappropriation of funds, agrees to remain crime-free for a period of 18 months, reports to a pre-trial services officer, and repays the misappropriated funds.

== Election history ==
=== 2016 campaign ===
Gardner ran against three Democratic opponents to secure her post as Circuit Attorney in the 2016 elections, following the retirement of Jennifer Joyce. She ran on reforming and rebuilding trust in the criminal justice system and reducing violent crime. She also promised to increase diversity, bring independent investigations of police use of force, work to reduce racial disparities, and enhance gun control. Gardner's campaign accepted $190,750.73 from 'Super PACs' (Political Action Committees) funded in part by billionaire George Soros.

2016 Democratic Primary for STL Circuit Attorney
Party	Candidate	Votes	%
Dem	Kimberly Gardner	19,615	46.60
Dem	Mary Carl	9,924	23.58
Dem	Patrick Hamacher	6,955	16.52
Dem	Steve Harmon	5,595	13.29

=== 2020 campaign ===
On August 4, Gardner won a contested primary for reelection, receiving 60.9% of the vote against her leading 2016 primary opponent, Mary Pat Carl. Gardner won the November general election with 74.01% of the vote, defeating Republican Daniel Zdrodowski.

2020 Democratic Primary for STL Circuit Attorney
Party	Candidate	Votes	%
Dem	Kimberly Gardner	43,878	60.92
Dem	Mary Carl	28,151	39.08

2020 General Election for STL Circuit Attorney
Party	Candidate	Votes	%
Dem	Kimberly Gardner	96,432	74.01
Rep	Daniel Zdrodowski	33,509	25.72
	Write-in	434	0.34
