= Sam Dotson =

American police commissioner (born 1969)

Chief of Police for the Amtrak Police Department
- In office July 2020 – April 2026
- Preceded by: Neil Trugman

34th Commissioner of the St. Louis Metropolitan Police Department
- In office December 14, 2012 – April 17, 2017
- Director of Public Safety: Charlene Deeken
- Mayor of St. Louis: Francis Slay and Lyda Krewson
- Preceded by: Daniel Isom
- Succeeded by: John Hayden Jr.

Director of Security for the Washington Nationals
- In office April 2018 – July 2018
- Succeeded by: Scott Fear

Assistant Chief of Police for the Amtrak Police Department
- In office Aug 2018 – July 2020

Personal details
- Born: Doyle Samuel Dotson III; 1969 (age 56–57) St. Louis, Missouri, U.S.
- Spouse: Deanna Venker (m. 2019)
- Education: Webster University (BA); Fontbonne University (MBA)

Doyle Samuel Dotson III is former the Chief of Police for the Amtrak Police Department. He was previously St Louis' Police Commissioner from 2013 to 2017.

== Early life and education ==
Dotson is a 1987 graduate of Metro Academic and Classical High School. He earned a Bachelor of Arts in Management from Webster University and a Masters in Business Administration from Fontbonne University. He is a graduate of the Senior Management Institute for Police.

== Career ==
Dotson joined the Metropolitan Police Department, City of St. Louis on October 11, 1993; he was assigned to the Fourth District. In 2001, he was promoted to sergeant where he served in the office of the Chief and the Ninth District. In 2007, he was promoted to lieutenant where he served in the office of the Chief. In 2008, he was promoted to captain where he served in the office of the Chief, the Seventh District, and the Board of Police Commissioners. Prior to being named Police Commissioner, he served as the city's operations director.

He became St. Louis' 34th Police Commissioner on December 14, 2012. In 2016 he stood for Mayor of St. Louis. He resigned as Police Commissioner on April 17, 2017, when Lyda Krewson became Mayor. After that he worked as Director of Security for the Washington Nationals baseball team, before being appointed in October 2018 as assistant chief of police for Amtrak.

== Personal and family life ==
Dotson disclosed that for years he had been estranged from his mother, who in 2018 was convicted for theft of over $2 million from a real estate company.

Police appointments
Preceded by Daniel Isom	Metropolitan Police Commissioner; 2012–2017	Succeeded by John Hayden Jr.
