= Ron Henderson =

American police officer

31st Commissioner of the St. Louis Metropolitan Police Department
- In office May 11, 1971 – May 11, 2001
- Director of Public Safety: Sam Simon
- Mayor of St. Louis: Francis Slay
- Preceded by: Clarence Harmon
- Succeeded by: Joe Mokwa

Personal details
- Born: Ronald Henderson; December 24, 1947 (age 78)

Ronald Henderson was St. Louis' 31st Chief of Police. He was an officer for 29 years and Chief for 6½ years in the Metropolitan Police Department, City of St. Louis, becoming the second African-American Police Chief of St. Louis.

He was previously St Louis' Police Commissioner from 1995 to 2001.

Police appointments
Preceded by Clarence Harmon	St. Louis Metropolitan Police Commissioner; 1995–2001	Succeeded by Joe Mokwa
