= Steve Butz =

American politician (born 1959)

Member of the Missouri House of Representatives from the 81st district
- Incumbent
- Assumed office January 9, 2019
- Preceded by: Fred Wessels
- Succeeded by: James Lappe (elect)

Personal details
- Born: February 28, 1959 (age 67)
- Party: Democratic

Stephen F. Butz (born February 28, 1959) is a Democratic member of the Missouri General Assembly representing the State's 81st House district. He is a candidate for Missouri's 4th Senate district in the 2026 Missouri State Senate election.

== Career ==
Butz is the president of Crawford-Butz Insurance Agency and a manager of Eagle Hurst Ranch in Steelville.

Butz first ran for office in 2016 against incumbent Fred Wessels. Butz was elected unopposed on 6 November 2018 from the platform of Democratic Party. He was unopposed in 2020, and defeated primary challenger Bill Stephens in 2022.

=== Political views ===
Butz opposes abortion but does not support legislation banning abortion without exceptions for rape or incest. In 2019, Butz voted against Missouri House Bill 126, which went into effect after Dobbs v. Jackson Women's Health Organization, after initially supporting it.

Butz has supported the state-takeover of St. Louis Metropolitan Police Department and the establishment of the Board of Police Commissioners in the City of St. Louis. In 2024, Butz requested Mike Parson to place Missouri Highway Patrol on St. Louis highways. In 2025, Butz received donations from commission member and local restaurateur Chris Saracino.

In 2025, Butz challenged Republican efforts to weaken paid sick leave provisions, and make cuts to income tax.

Butz supports school choice and gave preliminary approval for a bill to transfer money from St. Louis Public Schools to charter schools. He ultimately voted against the bill because he was not allowed time to speak in session. In 2024, Butz was one of three House Democrats to vote in favor of a Sinquefield-backed education reform bill that adjusted the state funding formula, mandated a minimum salary for educators, permitted charter schools in Columbia, Missouri, and expanded the state MOScholars program.

In 2025, Butz voted "present" on a measure to remove capital gains tax from Missouri revenue.

In 2026, Butz co-sponsored a bill with George J. Hruza that requires Missouri public education institutions to utilize the IHRA definition of antisemitism in evaluating cases of harassment or discrimination.

== Electoral history ==
Missouri House of Representatives Primary Election, August 2, 2016, District 81
Party	Candidate	Votes	%	±%
Democratic	Alfred (Fred) Wessels	1,839	48.23%	
Democratic	Steve Butz	1,363	35.75%	
Democratic	Adam Kustra	611	16.02%	
Total votes		3,813	100.00%	

Missouri House of Representatives Primary Election, August 7, 2018, District 81
Party	Candidate	Votes	%	±%
Democratic	Steve Butz	2,903	50.81%	+15.06
Democratic	Travis Estes	2,813	49.19%	n/a
Total votes		5,716	100.00%	

Missouri House of Representatives Election, November 6, 2018, District 81
Party	Candidate	Votes	%	±%
Democratic	Steve Butz	9,789	100.00%	
Total votes		9,789	100.00%	

Missouri House of Representatives Election, November 3, 2020, District 81
Party	Candidate	Votes	%	±%
Democratic	Steve Butz	11,461	100.00%	0.00
Total votes		11,461	100.00%	

Missouri House of Representatives Primary Election, August 2, 2022, District 81
Party	Candidate	Votes	%	±%
Democratic	Steve Butz	2,630	60.20%	
Democratic	Bill Stephens	1,739	39.80%	
Total votes		4,369	100.00%	

Missouri House of Representatives Election, November 8, 2022, District 81
Party	Candidate	Votes	%	±%
Democratic	Steve Butz	7,592	77.67%	−22.33
Republican	Jake Koehr	2,183	22.33%	+22.33
Total votes		9,775	100.00%	
