= Tom Villa =

American politician (1945–2023)

- Born: March 16, 1945; St. Louis, Missouri
- Died: January 20, 2023 (aged 77)
- Political party: Democratic

Thomas Albert Villa (March 16, 1945 – January 20, 2023) was an American Democratic politician from Missouri. He was a member of the Missouri House of Representatives and later represented Ward 11, the Carondelet neighborhood and surrounding areas, on the Board of Aldermen of the City of St. Louis.

Villa was born and raised in St. Louis and is the son of the late Albert "Red" Villa. The elder Villa was the longest-serving member of the St. Louis Board of Aldermen. He was educated at St. Mary's High School and Saint Louis University and received a master's degree in education from the University of Missouri–St. Louis in 1971. Before starting his political career, Villa worked as a teacher and guidance counselor.

Villa was first elected to the Missouri House of Representatives in 1974. He was re-elected four times and held leadership positions as Majority Whip from 1978 to 1980 and Majority Floor Leader from 1980 to 1984. In 1984 he was an unsuccessful candidate for Missouri State Treasurer.

In 1987, Villa was elected to citywide office as President of the St. Louis Board of Aldermen. He was reelected to that position in 1991. In 1993 he was a candidate for Mayor of St. Louis but finished second in the Democratic primary behind Freeman Bosley Jr. His term as President of the Board expired in 1995, and Villa did not seek re-election. Villa remained out of public office for several years. In 2000 he was again elected to the Missouri House and was re-elected in 2002, 2004 and 2006. He retired from the House in 2008.

Villa died on January 20, 2023, at the age of 77.

Party political offices
Preceded by Mel Carnahan	Democratic nominee for State Treasurer of Missouri; 1984	Succeeded by Bob Holden
Preceded by Tom Zych	President St. Louis Board of Aldermen; 1987–1995	Succeeded by Francis Slay
