= Joe Mokwa =

32nd Chief of Police for St. Louis, Missouri (2001–2008)

32nd Commissioner of the St. Louis Metropolitan Police Department
- In office May 11, 2001 – May 11, 2008
- Director of Public Safety: Charles Bryson
- Mayor of St. Louis: Francis Slay
- Preceded by: Ron Henderson
- Succeeded by: Daniel Isom

Personal details
- Born: Joseph J. Mokwa; February 18, 1949 (age 77)
- Spouses: Janet Torrisi-Mokwa (m. 1988; died 2018); Ellen Cusumano (m. 2020)
- Children: 1
- Education: Webster University

Joseph J. Mokwa was appointed St. Louis' 32nd Chief of the St. Louis Metropolitan Police Department. He was an officer for 37 years in the Metropolitan Police Department, City of St. Louis, and started his 7½ year tenure of police commissioner in 2001. Mokwa retired amidst controversy in late July 2008.

== Career ==
Col. Mokwa joined the Metropolitan Police Department, City of St. Louis on February 8, 1971. He was promoted to Police Chief on May 11, 2001. He was the city's 32nd Chief of Police.

During his 34-year career Mokwa served in almost every unit of the Department. His first assignment as a patrol officer was in the Fifth District. He worked in the Fourth, Fifth, Sixth and Ninth Districts as an officer and as a supervisor. As an investigator he worked in the District Detective Bureau as well as the Intelligence Unit and the Internal Affairs Division. Prior to being promoted to Chief of Police, he served as the Assistant Chief of Police, responsible for the Bureau of Professional Standards, which includes the Internal Affairs, Police Academy, Information Services (Technology) and Special Services Divisions. After he retired from the Department, he attained his second Masters degree from Webster University in therapy and counseling. He was a therapist until 2023.

Police appointments
Preceded by Ron Henderson	Metropolitan Police Commissioner; 2001–2008	Succeeded by Daniel Isom
