= Clarence Harmon =

American politician (born 1940)

44th Mayor of St. Louis
- In office April 15, 1997 – April 17, 2001
- Preceded by: Freeman Bosley Jr.
- Succeeded by: Francis Slay

30th Commissioner of the St. Louis Metropolitan Police Department
- In office January 1992 – January 1995
- Appointed by: Vincent C. Schoemehl
- Preceded by: Robert Scheetz
- Succeeded by: Ron Henderson

Personal details
- Born: 1940 (age 85–86) St. Louis, Missouri, U.S.
- Spouse: Janet Kelley
- Children: 4
- Education: Webster University; Truman State University
- Profession: Politician, police chief

Clarence Harmon (born 1940) was the 44th Mayor of St. Louis (from 1997 to 2001), and the city's second African-American mayor.

== Early life and education ==
Harmon was born to a Baptist family, and the only boy out of three children. His father was a cook on a railway, while his mother was a nurse. As a boy, Harmon was converted to Catholicism in order to attend the McBride High School a boys-only institution. After graduating from it, he served in the US Army in the 101st Airborne Division and then got enrolled into Northeast Missouri State University (now Truman State University).

== Career ==
Prior to serving as Mayor, Harmon had served as Metropolitan Police Department, City of St. Louis's 30th Commissioner of the St. Louis Metropolitan Police Department between the years 1991 and 1995, becoming the first African American to do so. During the time as Police Commissioner his duty was to patrol Fox Park, St. Louis, which was crime infested, but in 30 days time, the city's crime dropped 47%.

He defeated incumbent Mayor Freeman Bosley Jr. in the Democratic Primary in 1997 and went on to win election by a wide margin in the general election. Following his victory, Harmon shouted "Tear down the walls of isolation, St. Louis!", calling for the unity and racial healing. Harmon was defeated for re-election in the 2001 Democratic primary.

Political offices
Preceded by Robert Scheetz	Metropolitan Police Commissioner; 1991–1995	Succeeded by Ron Henderson
Preceded by Freeman Bosley Jr.	Mayor of St. Louis; 1997–2001	Succeeded by Francis Slay
