= St. Louis Riot =

St. Louis Riot may refer to

- The Camp Jackson Affair in St. Louis, Missouri in 1861
- The East St. Louis Riot in East St. Louis, Illinois in 1917
- The 1991 Riverport Amphitheater Riot
- The 2017 St. Louis protests
