= Mokwa (surname) =

Mokwa is a surname. Notable people with the surname include:

- Joe Mokwa (born 1959), American police officer
- Tomasz Mokwa (born 1993), Polish footballer
