= 1984 Missouri State Treasurer election =

- November 6, 1984
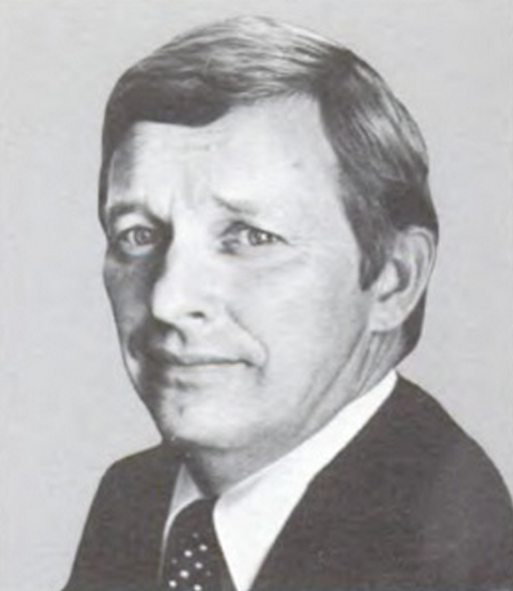

Nominee	Wendell Bailey	Tom Villa
Party	Republican	Democratic
Popular vote	1,036,548	1,008,154
Percentage	50.69%	49.31%
State Treasurer before election
Mel Carnahan
Democratic
Elected State Treasurer
Wendell Bailey
Republican

The 1984 Missouri State Treasurer election was held on November 6, 1984, in order to elect the state treasurer of Missouri. Republican nominee and former member of the U.S. House of Representatives from Missouri's 8th district Wendell Bailey defeated Democratic nominee and incumbent member of the Missouri House of Representatives Tom Villa.

== General election ==
On election day, November 6, 1984, Republican nominee Wendell Bailey won the election by a margin of 28,394 votes against his opponent Democratic nominee Tom Villa, thereby gaining Republican control over the office of state treasurer. Bailey was sworn in as the 41st state treasurer of Missouri on January 8, 1985.

=== Results ===
Missouri State Treasurer election, 1984
Party	Candidate	Votes	%
Republican	Wendell Bailey	1,036,548	50.69
Democratic	Tom Villa	1,008,154	49.31
Total votes		2,044,702	100.00
Republican gain from Democratic			

== See also ==
- 1984 Missouri gubernatorial election
