= Daniel Isom =

33rd Commissioner of the St. Louis Metropolitan Police Department
- In office October 6, 2008 – December 4, 2013
- Director of Public Safety: Richard Gray
- Mayor of St. Louis: Francis Slay
- Preceded by: Joe Mokwa
- Succeeded by: Sam Dotson

Director of the Missouri Department of Public Safety
- In office September 2014 – February 2015
- Preceded by: Jerry Lee
- Succeeded by: Peter Lyskowski

10th Director of the Public Safety Department - City of St. Louis
- In office April 20, 2021 – February 11, 2023
- Preceded by: Jimmie M. Edwards
- Succeeded by: Charles Coyle

Personal details
- Born: Daniel Isom; March 1, 1967 (age 59)
- Education: University of Missouri-St. Louis

Daniel Isom was appointed St. Louis' 33rd Police Commissioner on October 6, 2008, and was St. Louis' third African-American police chief.

Isom took a leave of absence as the executive director of the Regional Justice Information Service, most commonly known as REJIS. in April 2021 due to his appointment as Interim Director of the Public Safety Department - City of St. Louis by Mayor Tishaura Jones.

He was previously St Louis' Police Commissioner & Chief from 2008 to 2013.

== Career and education ==
He joined the Metropolitan Police Department on August 29, 1988. During his career, he served in patrol, investigations, training, and internal affairs positions. Promoted through the ranks, finally to Major in 2007, he worked as the Special Projects Assistant to the Police Commissioner until his promotion to Police Commissioner.

He previously served as an adjunct professor at Harris Stowe State University and an instructor at St. Louis Community College where he taught criminal justice, criminology, and public safety courses.

He has received an associate degree in Criminal Justice from Forest Park Community College, a Bachelor's, Master's and a Ph.D. in Criminology and Criminal Justice, all from the University of Missouri-St. Louis. He also holds a master's in Public Administration from Saint Louis University.

He is a graduate of the FBI National Academy, the Police Executive Forum Senior Management Institute and the FBI National Executives Institute.

Eisenhower Fellowships selected Daniel Isom as a U.S.A. Eisenhower Fellow in 2013. He traveled to Ireland and Germany for four weeks to study training and community policing in Europe.

The University of Chicago Institute of Politics selected him as an IOP Fellow in 2016. Isom delivered a series of seminars on police community relations and the future of policing in America.

=== Life after police chief ===
After retiring from the St. Louis Police Department, he took a teaching position on January 1, 2013, at the University of Missouri-St. Louis (UMSL). He is now an E. Desmond Lee Professor of Policing and the Community in the Criminology and Criminal Justice Department at UMSL.

In August 2014, he was appointed as Director of the Missouri Department of Public Safety in the Cabinet of Governor Jay Nixon. On November 18, 2014, Missouri Gov. Jay Nixon appointed the Ferguson Commission – a volunteer group of 16 diverse community leaders to listen to and engage with area organizations, national thought leaders, institutions, experts and citizens. Isom was appointed as a commissioner and served as the co-chair of the commission task force on police community relations.

Police appointments
Preceded by Joe Mokwa	Metropolitan Police Commissioner; 2008–2013	Succeeded by Doyle Sam Dotson III
