= 1993 St. Louis mayoral election =

- April 6, 1993
- Turnout: 22.02%

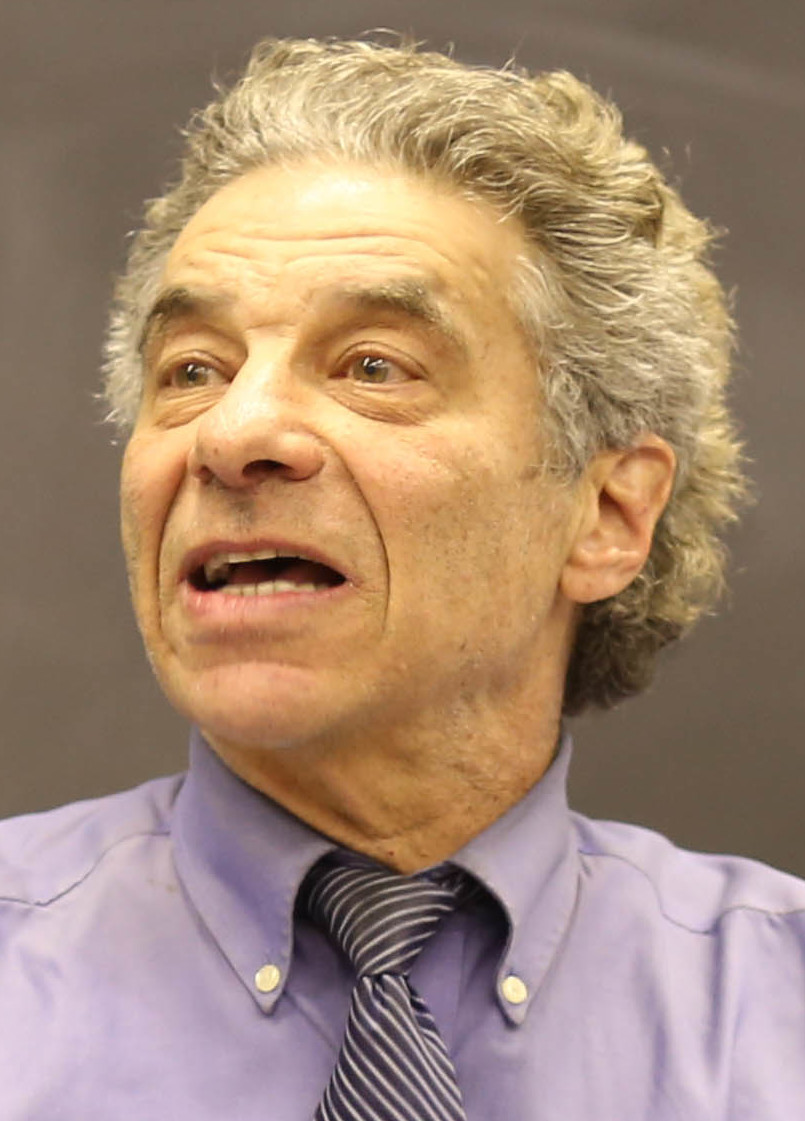
Candidate	Freeman Bosley Jr.	John O'Gorman	Bill Haas
Party	Democratic	Republican	Independent
Popular vote	58,089	15,034	13,452
Percentage	66.49%	17.21%	15.4%
Mayor before election
Vincent C. Schoemehl
Democratic
Elected mayor
Freeman Bosley Jr.
Democratic

The 1993 St. Louis mayoral election was held on April 6, 1993 to elect the mayor of St. Louis, Missouri. It saw the election of Freeman Bosley Jr., the first African-American Mayor of St. Louis.

The election was preceded by party primaries on March 2.

== Democratic primary ==
Democratic primary results
Party	Candidate	Votes	%
Democratic	Freeman Bosley Jr.	40,372	44.04
Democratic	Tom Villa	33,055	36.06
Democratic	Tony Ribaudo	11,359	12.39
Democratic	Steven Roberts	6,879	7.51
Turnout		91,665	23.11

== General election ==
General election result
Party	Candidate	Votes	%
Democratic	Freeman Bosley Jr.	58,089	66.49
Republican	John O'Gorman	15,034	17.21
Independent	Bill Haas	13,452	15.4
Independent	James Garrison Jr.	790	0.9
Turnout		87,365	22.02
