= 2013 St. Louis mayoral election =

- April 2, 2013
- Turnout: 12.08%
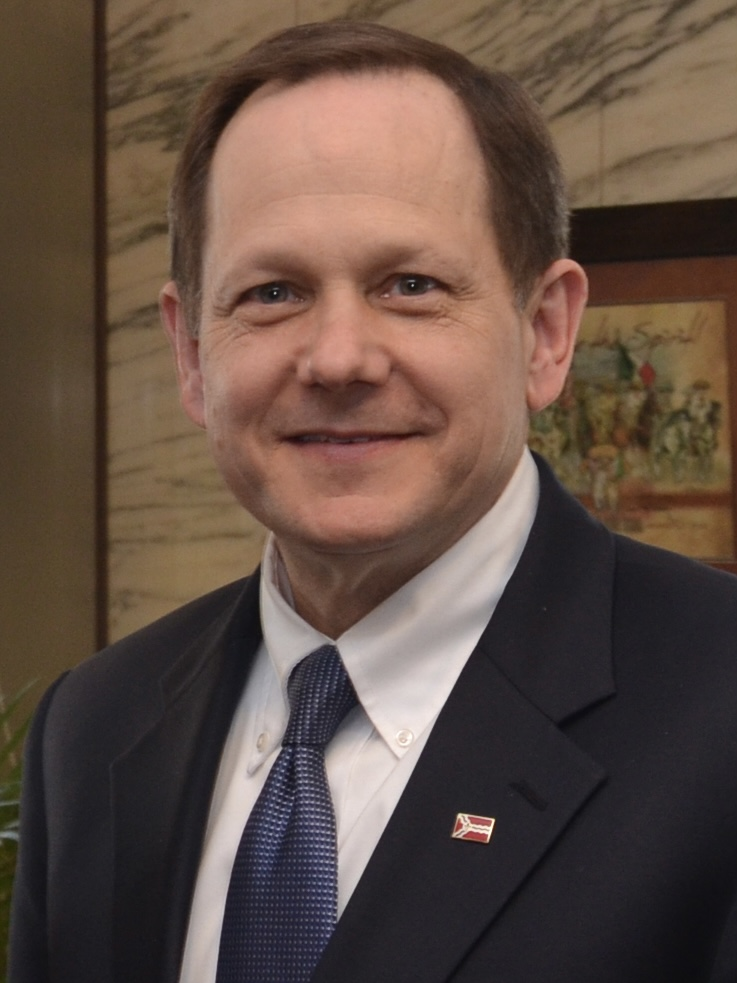

Candidate	Francis Slay	James McNeely
Party	Democratic	Green
Popular vote	19,989	3,779
Percentage	82.22%	15.54%
- Results by ward Slay: 70–80% 80–90%
Mayor before election
Francis Slay
Democratic
Elected mayor
Francis Slay
Democratic

The 2013 St. Louis mayoral election was held on April 2, 2013 to elect the mayor of St. Louis, Missouri. It saw the reelection of incumbent mayor Francis Slay to a fourth term.

The election was preceded by party primaries on March 5.

== Democratic primary ==
Incumbent mayor Francis Slay was challenged for renomination by St. Louis City Board of Aldermen President Lewis E. Reed, as well as by Jimmie Matthews.

Democratic primary results
Party	Candidate	Votes	%
Democratic	Francis Slay (incumbent)	23,968	54.42
Democratic	Lewis Reed	19,496	44.27
Democratic	Jimmie Matthews	576	1.31
Total votes		44,040	

== Green primary ==
Green primary results
Party	Candidate	Votes	%
Green	James McNeely	115	100
Total votes		115	

== Results ==
=== Results ===
General election result
Party	Candidate	Votes	%
Democratic	Francis Slay (incumbent)	19,989	82.22%
Green	James McNeely	3,779	15.54%
Write-in	Write-ins	543	2.23%
Turnout		24,311	12.08
