= 2009 St. Louis mayoral election =

- April 7, 2009
- Turnout: 17.01%
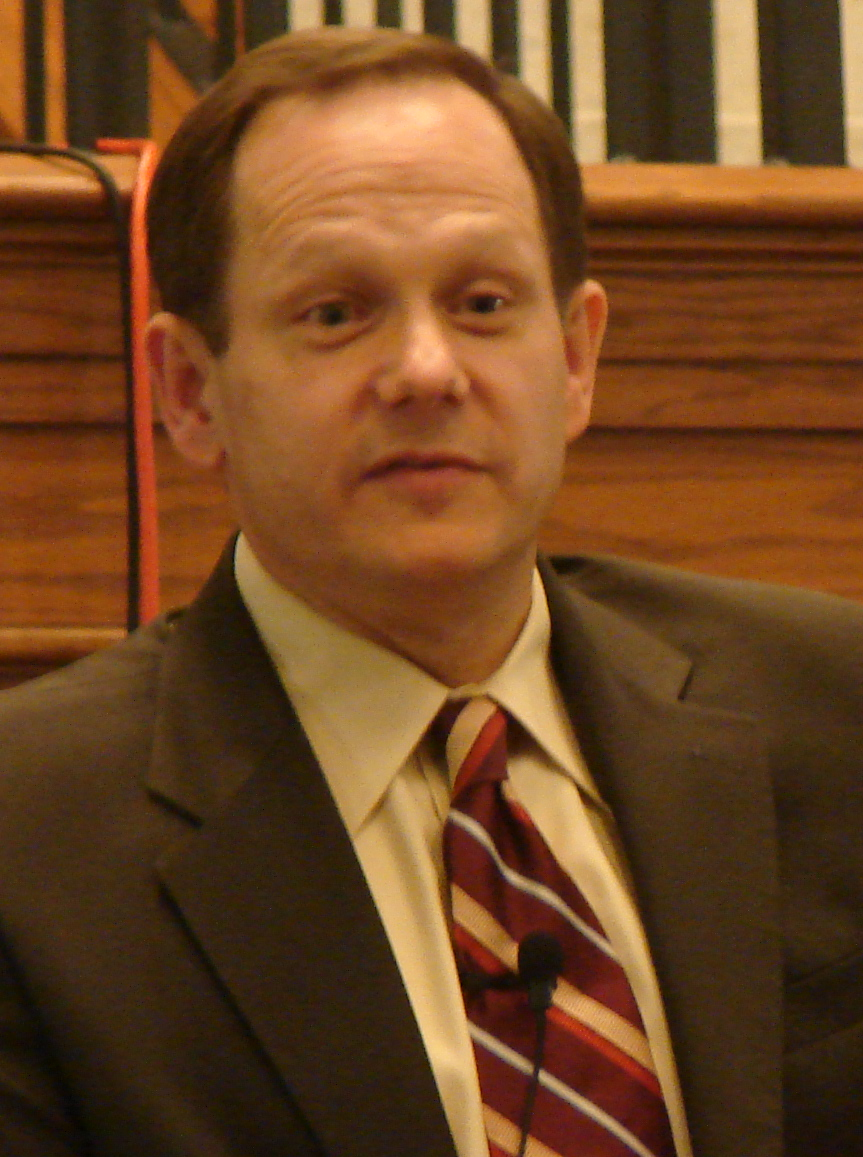

Candidate	Francis Slay	Maida Coleman
Party	Democratic	Independent
Popular vote	22,920	12,954
Percentage	60.69%	34.30%
Mayor before election
Francis Slay
Democratic
Elected mayor
Francis Slay
Democratic

The 2009 St. Louis mayoral election was held on April 7, 2009 to elect the mayor of St. Louis, Missouri. It saw the reelection of incumbent mayor Francis Slay to a third term.

The election was preceded by party primaries on March 3.

== Democratic primary ==
Incumbent mayor Francis Slay was challenged for renomination by alderman Irene J. Smith as well as by Denise Coleman.

Democratic primary results
Party	Candidate	Votes	%
Democratic	Francis Slay (incumbent)	19,359	61.56
Democratic	Irene J. Smith	10,039	31.93
Democratic	Denise Coleman	2,047	6.51
Total votes		31,445	

== Green primary ==
Green primary results
Party	Candidate	Votes	%
Green	Elston McCowan	117	69.64
Green	Don DeVivo	51	30.36
Total votes		168	

== Libertarian primary ==
Libertarian primary results
Party	Candidate	Votes	%
Libertarian	Robb Cunningham	78	100
Total votes		78	

== Independent candidates ==
- Maida Coleman

== General election ==
General election result
Party	Candidate	Votes	%
Democratic	Francis Slay (incumbent)	22,920	60.69%
Independent	Maida Coleman	12,954	34.30%
Green	Elston McCowan	1,209	3.20%
Libertarian	Robb Cunningham	595	1.58%
Write-in	Write-ins	86	0.23%
Turnout		37,764	17.01
