= 2005 St. Louis mayoral election =

- April 5, 2005
- Turnout: 12.10%
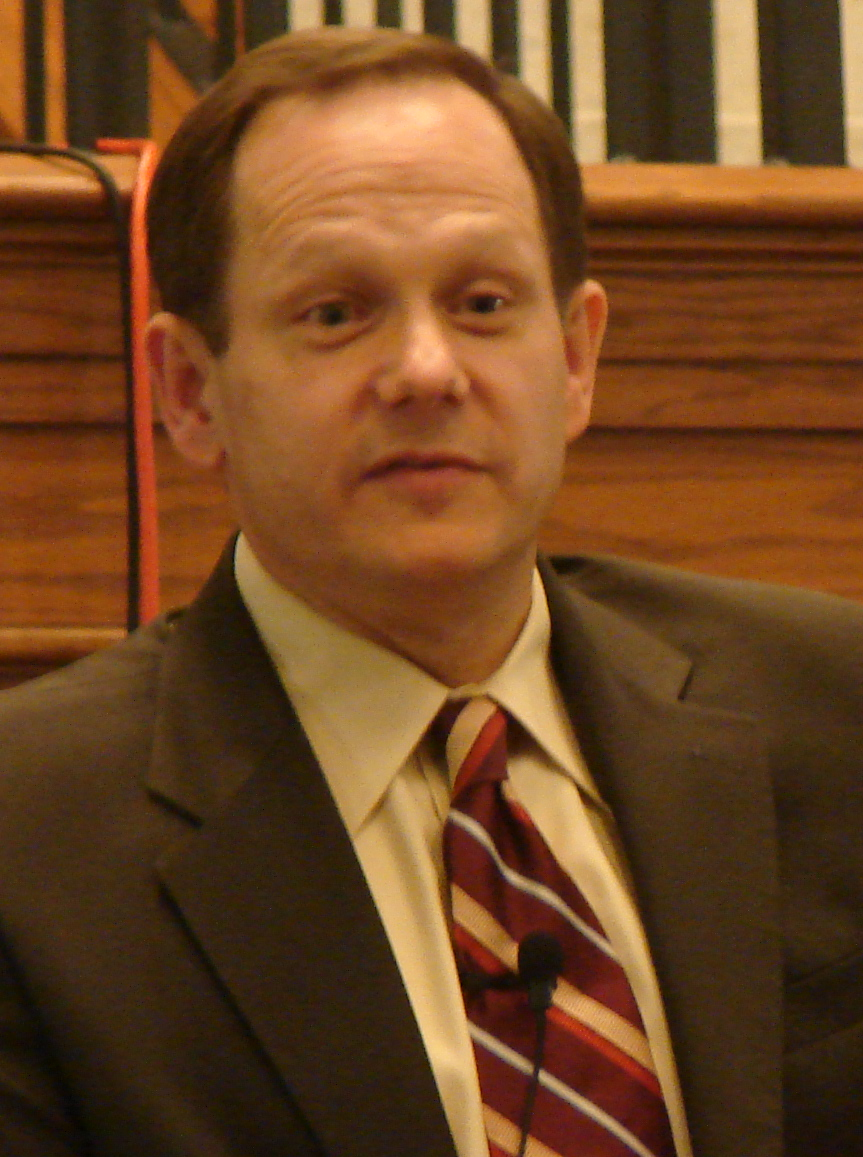

Candidate	Francis Slay	Willie Marshall
Party	Democratic	Green
Popular vote	19,513	5,272
Percentage	78.73%	21.27%
Mayor before election
Francis Slay
Democratic
Elected mayor
Francis Slay
Democratic

The 2005 Saint Louis mayoral election was held on April 5, 2005 to elect the mayor of St. Louis, Missouri. It saw the reelection of incumbent mayor Francis Slay to a second term.

The election was preceded by party primaries on March 8.

== Democratic primary ==
Incumbent mayor Francis Slay was challenged for renomination by alderman Irene J. Smith as well as by Bill Haas.

Democratic primary results
Party	Candidate	Votes	%
Democratic	Francis Slay (incumbent)	24,952	61.56
Democratic	Irene J. Smith	11,741	30.93
Democratic	William "Bill" Haas	1,264	3.33
Turnout		37,957	18.04

== Green primary ==
Green primary results
Party	Candidate	Votes	%
Green	Willie Marshall	123	100
Total votes		123	

== General election ==
General election result
Party	Candidate	Votes	%
Democratic	Francis Slay (incumbent)	19,513	78.73%
Green	Willie Marshall	5,272	21.27%
Turnout		24,785	12.10
