= St. Louis City Board of Police Commissioners =

Civilian body overseeing the SLMPD

St. Louis Board of Police Commissioners
- Logo of the St. Louis City Police Department
- Formation: 2025
- Type: Civilian oversight board
- Purpose: To oversee the St. Louis Metropolitan Police Department and set department policy and goals
- Headquarters: 1915 Olive St. St. Louis, Missouri, U.S.
- Region served: St. Louis, Missouri, U.S.
- President: Chris Saracino
- Website: St. Louis City Board of Police Commissioners

The St. Louis Board of Police Commissioners, also commonly known as the St Louis Police Commission, is a Six -member body of civilian-only, appointed officials which oversees the St. Louis Metropolitan Police Department.

== Organization ==
The board is made up of five members who are appointed by the appointed by the Governor of Missouri. must be confirmed by the Missouri Senate Each member serves a five-year term with a maximum of two terms.

=== Administration ===
Commission	Title and Role
Cara Spencer	Mayor of St. Louis
Chris Saracino	Board President
Sonya Jenkins-Gray	Board Vice President
Edward K McVey	Board Treasurer
Donald F. Brown	non-voting member
Bradley T. Arteaga	Board Secretary
Lieutenant Colin Tully	Secretary to the Board

== Responsibilities ==
The Board of Police Commissioners is the collective head of the St. Louis Metropolitan Police Department. It sets the overall policy while the Police Commissioner manages the daily operations of the department and implements the board's policies and goals. The board meets every Tuesday in a public hearing room at police headquarters where the public may comment on the matters at hand as well as address the board directly.
