= 1997 St. Louis mayoral election =

- April 1, 1997
- Turnout: 18.75%
Candidate	Clarence Harmon	Marit Clark	Jay Dearing
Party	Democratic	Independent	Republican
Popular vote	53,646	17,138	3,590
Percentage	72.13%	23.04%	4.83%
Mayor before election
Freeman Bosley Jr.
Democratic
Elected mayor
Clarence Harmon
Democratic

The 1997 St. Louis mayoral election was held on April 1, 1997 to elect the mayor of St. Louis, Missouri. It saw the election of Clarence Harmon and the defeat of incumbent mayor Freeman Bosley Jr. in the Democratic primary.

The election was preceded by party primaries on March 4.

== Democratic primary ==
Democratic primary results
Party	Candidate	Votes	%
Democratic	Clarence Harmon	56,926	56.35
Democratic	Freeman Bosley Jr. (incumbent)	43,346	42.91
Democratic	Bill Haas	756	0.75
Turnout		101,028	25.47

== General election ==
General election result
Party	Candidate	Votes	%
Democratic	Clarence Harmon	53,646	72.13
Independent	Marit Clark	17,138	23.04
Republican	Jay Dearing	3,590	4.83
Turnout		74,374	18.75
