= John F. Berner =

Police chief of St. Louis

- Died: March 10, 1996

John F. Berner (died March 10, 1996) was Commissioner of the St. Louis Metropolitan Police Department from 1982 to 1985.

Police appointments
Preceded by Eugene Camp	Commissioner of the St. Louis Metropolitan Police Department; 1982–85	Succeeded by Robert Scheetz
