= 2001 St. Louis mayoral election =

- April 3, 2001
- Turnout: 13.61%
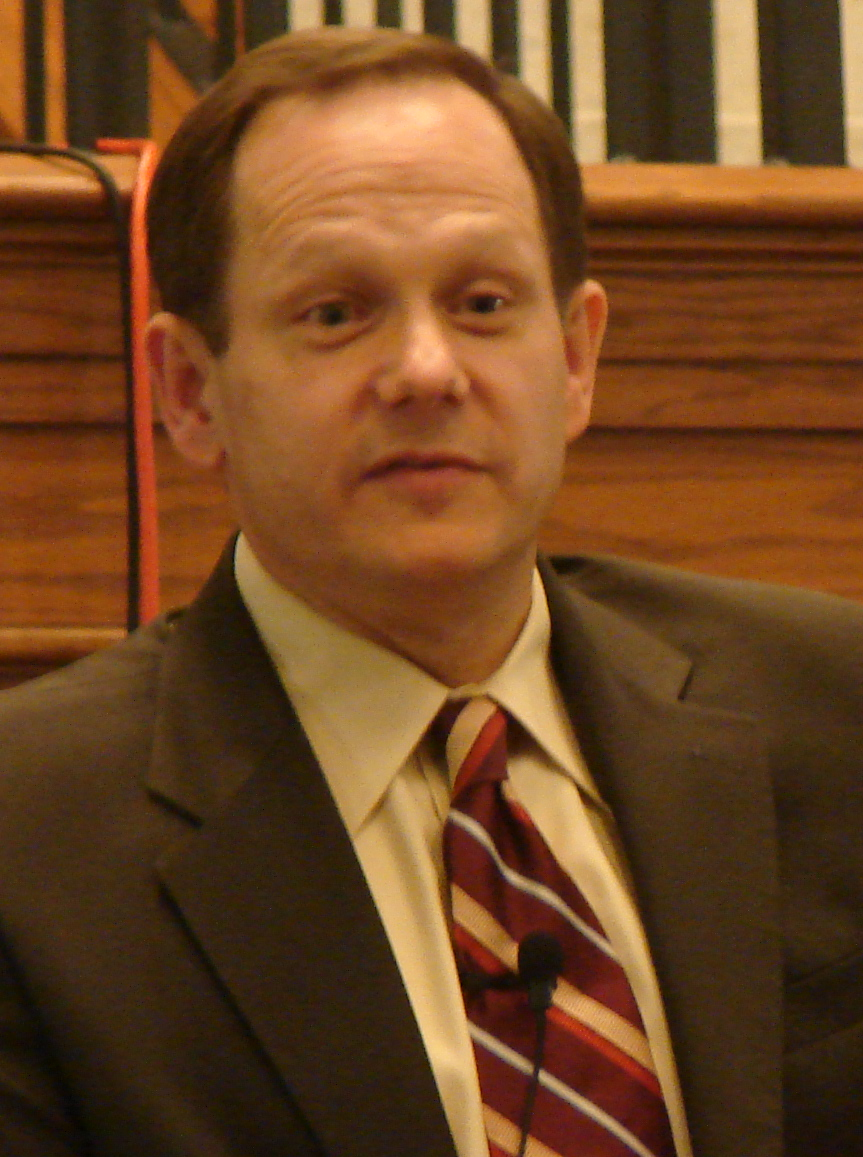

Candidate	Francis Slay	Mike Chance
Party	Democratic	Republican
Popular vote	41,472	5,917
Percentage	87.51%	12.49%
Mayor before election
Clarence Harmon
Democratic
Elected mayor
Francis Slay
Democratic

The 2001 St. Louis mayoral election was held on April 3, 2001 to elect the mayor of St. Louis, Missouri. It saw the election of Francis Slay and the defeat of incumbent mayor Clarence Harmon in the Democratic primary.

The election was preceded by party primaries on March 6.

== Democratic primary ==
Democratic primary results
Party	Candidate	Votes	%
Democratic	Francis Slay	46,090	53.52
Democratic	Freeman Bosley Jr.	35,326	41.02
Democratic	Clarence Harmon (incumbent)	4,282	4.97
Democratic	Bill Haas	424	0.49
Turnout		86,122	24.73

== General election ==
General election result
Party	Candidate	Votes	%
Democratic	Francis Slay	41,472	87.51
Republican	Mike Chance	5,917	12.49
Turnout		47,389	13.61
