= Jimmie M. Edwards =

American judge

9th Director of the Public Safety Department - City of St. Louis
- In office November 6, 2017 – March 31, 2021
- Preceded by: Richard Gray
- Succeeded by: Daniel Isom

Personal details
- Born: June 18, 1955 (age 70) St. Louis, Missouri, U.S.
- Party: Democratic
- Spouse: Stacy Edwards
- Children: 3
- Profession: Lawyer, politician, circuit judge

Jimmie M. Edwards was a circuit judge for the 22nd Judicial Circuit, serving St. Louis. He was appointed to the court in April 1992. Edwards left the bench in October 2017 due to his appointment as Director of the Public Safety Department - City of St. Louis by Mayor Lyda Krewson.

== Education ==
Edwards received his undergraduate degree in 1978 and his J.D. in 1982, both from St. Louis University.

== Career ==
- 1992–2017: 22nd Circuit Court
- 1989–1992: Attorney, Southwestern Bell Telephone Company
- 1984–1989: General counsel, Sabreliner Corporation
- 1981–1984: Attorney in private practice

== Controversy ==
In Summer 2019, Edwards was at the center of a controversy over public statements made following the deaths of thirteen minors as a result of violent crime. During an interview with Saint Louis Public Radio, Edwards stated that not all the minors killed were "innocent bystanders", asserting that many of them were involved in criminal activities. Edwards reiterated his comments at an October 11 meeting of the STL Public Safety Committee. Edwards statements were condemned in a joint resolution by thirteen Saint Louis activist organizations, including Action St. Louis, ArchCity Defenders, ACLU-Missouri, Metropolitan Congregations United, the Deaconess Foundation and the Organization for Black Struggle, writing "This kind of demonization of our children is shocking and unacceptable. It builds on racist, dehumanizing tropes about Black children and distracts from the public policies that continue to deepen poverty and despair instead of investing resources to create safety and opportunity. Public Safety Director Edwards is the highest-ranking law enforcement official in the City of St. Louis. If this is what he thinks of children dying in the streets, it is no wonder that the response from public safety officials continues to focus on police, surveillance, and incarceration."

== Awards and Associations ==
- 2011: Hero of the Year, People Magazine
- 2010: Raymond Pace Alexander Award for Outstanding Judicial Advocacy and Humanity, National Bar Association
- Mentor of the Year, 100 Black Men
- Annie Malone Children and Family Advocacy Award
- Teacher of the Year, Saint Louis University
- Missouri Bar Association
- Mound City Bar Association
- National Bar Association
- Bar Association of Metropolitan St. Louis
- Habitat for Humanity Saint Louis
- Antioch Baptist Church
