= James Lappe =

American politician

Member-elect of the Missouri House of Representatives from the 81st district
- Assuming office January 6, 2027
- Succeeding: Steve Butz

Personal details
- Born: Creve Coeur, Missouri
- Party: Democratic
- Education: University of Missouri–St. Louis; University of Missouri–Kansas City
- Website: Campaign website

James (Jimmy) P. Lappe is an American politician of the Missouri Democratic Party who is the representative-elect for the 81st district in the Missouri House of Representatives. He was elected in the 2026 general election. He is program coordinator for the Missouri AFL-CIO. He is an alderman in St. Louis.
