= Robert J. Tracy =

American police commissioner

36th Police Commissioner of St. Louis Metropolitan Police Department
- In office January 9, 2023 – Present
- Director of Public Safety: Shawn Dace
- Mayor of St. Louis: Cara Spencer
- Preceded by: John Hayden Jr.

Personal details
- Born: Robert J. Tracy Bronx, New York, U.S.
- Spouse: Brenda
- Children: 5
- Education: Marist College (MPA; Empire State College BA)

Robert J. Tracy is an American law enforcement officer who was appointed as the 36th Police Commissioner of the St. Louis Metropolitan Police Department on December 14, 2022, at a salary of $175,000 a year. An additional stipend of $100,000 a year, for 3 years, was given by the St. Louis Police Foundation.

As Police Commissioner Tracy is responsible for planning, directing, managing and overseeing the activities and operations of the Metropolitan Police Department, including field operations, investigations, support services, and general administration. He also coordinates activities with other city departments and outside agencies. He oversees a department of 808 officers per the Missouri Peace Officers Standards & Training and 400 civilian employees with a yearly budget of $270 million.

Police appointments
Preceded by John Hayden Jr.	Commissioner of the St. Louis Metropolitan Police Department; 2023–Present	Succeeded by Incumbent
