= John Hayden Jr. =

American police chief

35th Commissioner of the St. Louis Metropolitan Police Department
- In office December 28, 2017 – June 18, 2022
- Director of Public Safety: Daniel Isom
- Mayor of St. Louis: Tishaura Jones
- Preceded by: Sam Dotson
- Succeeded by: Robert J. Tracy

Interim Sheriff of City of St. Louis Sheriff's Department
- In office November 1, 2025 – Present
- Preceded by: Alfred Montgomery

Personal details
- Born: John W. Hayden, Jr. December 4, 1962 (age 63) St. Louis, Missouri, U.S.
- Spouse: Michelle
- Children: 3
- Education: Washington University in St. Louis (BA); Fontbonne University (MBA; Covenant Theological Seminary (TS)

John W. Hayden Jr. is the Interim Sheriff for the City of St. Louis Sheriff's Department. He was previously St Louis' Police Commissioner from 2017 to 2022.

== Early life and education ==
Hayden was born in St. Louis. He attended and graduated from Lutheran High School North (Missouri) in 1981. He received his Bachelor of Mathematics degree from Washington University in St. Louis and his master's degree in management from Fontbonne University. He was accepted into Saint Louis University School of Law and has completed over 50 credits in their Juris Doctor program. He has also completed 15 hours of graduate coursework in theological studies at the Covenant Theological Seminary.

Hayden is a life member of Kappa Alpha Psi. He is a member of the Police Executive Research Forum, the International Association of Chiefs of Police and the Major Cities Police Chiefs Association. He has served as a deacon at Pleasant Green Missionary Baptist Church in St. Louis since 1998.

== Career ==
Hayden joined the St. Louis Metropolitan Police Department on February 23, 1987, where he served in the Fourth District. He also was assigned to the Vice/Narcotics Division, Fourth District Detective Unit and the Police Academy and Commander of North Patrol. He was appointed as Commissioner of Police on December 28, 2017, at a salary of $153,000 a year.

He retired as Police Commissioner - Chief of Police on June 18, 2022,

Police appointments
Preceded by Sam Dotson	Commissioner of the St. Louis Metropolitan Police Department; 2018–2022	Succeeded by Robert J. Tracy
