= Janet Lauritsen =

American criminologist

Janet Lynn Lauritsen
- Education: University of Illinois at Urbana-Champaign
- Awards: 2010 Claude S. Fischer Award for Excellence from the American Sociological Association, fellow of the American Society of Criminology since 2013
- Scientific career
- Fields: Criminology
- Workplaces: University of Missouri-St. Louis
- Thesis: Adolescent sexual behavior and early childbearing: Empirical tests of social control and strain theories (1989)

Janet Lynn Lauritsen is an American criminologist and the Curators' Distinguished Professor Emerita of Criminology and Criminal Justice at the University of Missouri–St. Louis.

== Education and career ==
Lauritsen served as the executive counselor of the American Society of Criminology from 2004 to 2007. In 2022, she was elected president of the American Society of Criminology. She served as the co-editor of the journal Criminology (2016–2021) as well as serves on the editorial board of the Journal of Quantitative Criminology (1994–2016).

== Honors and awards ==
Lauritsen was named a fellow of the American Society of Criminology in 2013. Having retired, she now a Curators' Distinguished Professor Emerita of Criminology and Criminal Justice at the University of Missouri–St. Louis.
