= Killing of Anthony Lamar Smith =

2011 police shooting

Shooting of Anthony Lamar Smith
- Date: December 20, 2011
- Location: West Florissant Avenue and Acme Avenue, St. Louis, Missouri, U.S.
- Participants: Jason Stockley (police officer); Anthony Smith (deceased)
- Deaths: Anthony Smith
- Charges: First-degree murder
- Verdict: Not guilty

Anthony Lamar Smith was a 24-year-old African American man from St. Louis, Missouri, who was shot and killed by then St. Louis Police officer Jason Stockley following a car chase on December 20, 2011. On September 15, 2017, Stockley was found not guilty of first-degree murder, and protests erupted in St. Louis.

== Incident ==
Smith was previously convicted for drug distribution and unlawful possession of a firearm, and was out on probation for a theft charge at the time of the incident. Police officer Stockley and his partner have stated they saw Smith engaged in a drug deal. Dashcam footage from their police cruiser recorded Smith reversing his car into their vehicle twice before driving off. A car chase lasting three minutes ensued, ending when Stockley's partner, on Stockley's recommendation, rammed Smith's car. Stockley was recorded during the chase as saying "going to kill this motherfucker, don’t you know it". After the car was stopped, Stockley and his partner, Brian Bianchi, approached Smith's vehicle at West Florissant and Acme Avenues in north St. Louis. Witnesses testified and dashcam footage showed that Stockley yelled at Smith through the driver side window of Smith's vehicle to open the door. Stockley testified that Smith did not comply but rather appeared to be reaching around the interior of his vehicle in search of something which Stockley believed to be a gun. Stockley testified that Smith's demeanor suddenly changed, which Stockley believed indicated that Smith had found the alleged gun. Stockley then opened fire through the window and shot five times, killing Smith. The judge's ruling in subsequent criminal case found that the "[a]fter Smith is removed from the Buick, Stockley gets in on the driver's side;...The evidence at trial was that Stockley got into the car to search for a weapon, and Stockley testified that he found a handgun tucked between the seat and center console." In 2013 the St. Louis police board settled a wrongful death suit with Smith's survivors for $900,000.

== Criminal charges and trial ==
Jason Stockley was charged by St. Louis City prosecutors with first-degree murder in May 2016. He was arrested at his home in Houston, Texas.

During the trial, the prosecution had argued that the revolver found in Smith's car had been planted by Stockley to justify the shooting. However, in his ruling, St. Louis Circuit Judge Timothy Wilson said the prosecution's argument was not supported by the evidence. DNA experts testified that the gun recovered had no trace of Smith's DNA on it, and Stockley's DNA was present. The only DNA found on the gun in Smith’s car had a profile similar to Stockley’s, but, as the prosecution said, that does not conclusively prove that Smith did not touch the gun. Judge Wilson stated he found it difficult to believe the gun was concealed and planted by Stockley given the entire incident was on video and Stockley was not wearing a jacket. Wilson also noted Smith's DNA was found on the heroin in the car and that during his 28 years on the bench "an urban heroin dealer not in possession of a firearm would be an anomaly." Before this case, the judge had "ruled both for and against police during his 28 years on the bench." Defense lawyers and prosecutors interviewed by the Associated Press described him as "objective and well-respected".

== Protests ==
Prior to the verdict, a group of clergy publicly stated that an acquittal would result in "mass disruption" in the city. Missouri Governor Eric Greitens, who was openly critical of his predecessor Jay Nixon's response to the Ferguson unrest, preemptively activated the Missouri National Guard and scheduled 12-hour shifts for the St. Louis Municipal Police.

On September 15, 2017 protests erupted when Stockley was found not guilty of murder. Some of the protests turned violent. After declaring the protests an "unlawful assembly", police officers were pelted with water bottles and rocks. Protesters also descended upon mayor Lyda Krewson's home, and threw bricks at and vandalized it. Police deployed tear gas to break up the crowd and two officers were injured by bricks thrown by protesters. Over the night, ten police officers were injured and thirty-two protesters were arrested.

Protesters in attendance reported not hearing an order of dispersal before tear gas, and an estimated 250 people who took shelter in a nearby synagogue described being "held hostage" under threat of arrest.

The next day, the band U2 and singer Ed Sheeran both cancelled their weekend concerts in St. Louis out of safety concerns over ongoing protests. Protests during this day were largely peaceful, as demonstrators marched through two nearby shopping malls and into the streets. However, a small group of protesters at the Delmar Loop in St. Louis refused to disperse after the police asked them to leave. These protesters broke windows and threw objects at the police, who arrested nine people.

Protests continued on September 17 in the late afternoon, beginning outside the St. Louis police department, and demonstrators marched through the streets. In the night, event organizers told the protesters to go home, though a few dozen continued protesting. After a police officer made two arrests near the police department, the crowd confronted the police line and broke windows.

Police response to protests was criticized as unconstitutional and excessive force by the American Civil Liberties Union following a video release of law enforcement officers chanting "Whose streets? Our streets" after kettling several people downtown. In a press conference, interim police chief O'Toole described the kettling incident positively, saying that "police owned tonight." Mayor Lyda Krewson expressed gratitude to the police and cancelled town halls that were scheduled through the following week.

== See also ==
- Ferguson unrest
- Killing of Michael Brown
