= Commissioner of the St. Louis Metropolitan Police Department =

Commissioner/Chief of Metropolitan Police Department – City of St. Louis
- Incumbent; Robert J. Tracy since January 9, 2023
- Style: The Honorable
- Reports to: Board of Police Commissioners
- Residence: St. Louis, Missouri, U.S.
- Term length: 5 years Renewable
- Inaugural holder: James McDonough
- Formation: September 7, 1861; (165 years ago)
- Salary: $295,000
- Website: Commissioner/Chief

The Chief of Police of the Metropolitan Police Department – City of St. Louis (SLMPD) is the Highest Ranking Member of the St. Louis Metropolitan Police Department.

The post is currently held by Chief of Police Robert J. Tracy who was appointed on December 14, 2022 and assumed office on January 9, 2023.

== List of Chief of Police ==
Police commissioner	Term began – ended
James McDonough	1861
John E. D. Couzins	1861–1865
Bernard Laiboldt	1865–1866
William P. Finn	1866–1868
William Lee	1868–1870
James McDonough	1870–1874
Laurence Harrigan	1874–1875
James McDonough	1875–1881
Ferdinand B. Kennett	1881–1882
John W. Campbell	1882–1883
Bernard P. Taafee	1883
John W. Campbell	1883
Laurence Harrigan	1884–1886
Anton Huebler	1886–1890
Laurence Harrigan	1890–1898
John W. Campbell	1898–1901
Mathew Kiely	1901–1906
Edmund P. Creecy	1906–1910
William Young	1910–1919
Martin O'Brien	1919–1925
Joseph A. Gerk	1925–1934
John J. McCarthy	1934–1937
John H. Glasso	1937–1943
James J. Mitchell	1943–1946
Jeremiah O'Connell	1946–1959
Joseph Casey	1959–1960
Curtis Brostron	1960–1970
Eugene Camp	1970–1982
John F. Berner	1982–1985
Robert Scheetz	1985–1991
Clarence Harmon	1991–1995
Ron Henderson	1995–2001
Joseph J. Mokwa	2001–2008
Stephen Pollihan	July–Oct 2008 (Acting)
Daniel Isom	2008–2013
Doyle Sam Dotson III	2013–2017
Lawrence M. O'Toole	April–Dec 2017 (Acting)
John W. Hayden Jr.	2018–2022
Michel J. Sack	2022–Jan 2023 (Acting)
Robert J. Tracy	2023–present

== See also ==
- List of law enforcement agencies in Missouri
