= 2017 St. Louis protests =

2017 protests in Missouri, U.S.

2017 St. Louis Protests
- Part of Shooting of Anthony Lamar Smith
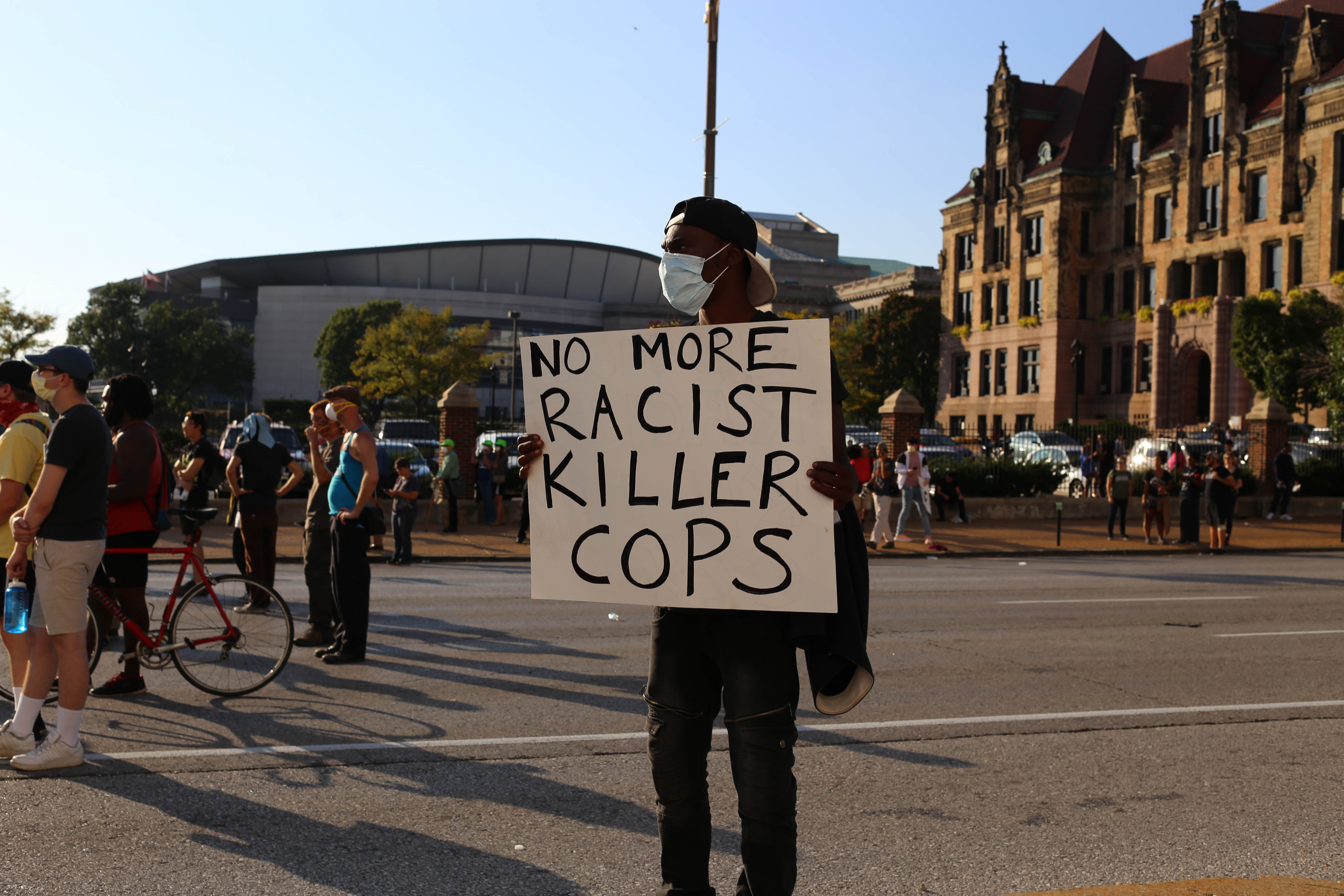
- Protesters in September 2017 in downtown St. Louis
- Date: September 15, 2017– November 24, 2017
- Location: St. Louis, Missouri and nearby areas in St. Louis County, Missouri
- Caused by: Acquittal of officer Jason Stockley in the shooting of Anthony Lamar Smith
- Methods: Protests, civil disobedience, vandalism

Parties
Local protesters; Black Lives Matter	Metropolitan Police Department, City of St. Louis; Missouri National Guard; St. Louis County Police Department

Number
1000+	200+

Casualties
- Injuries: 14
- Arrested: 300+

Beginning on the afternoon of September 15, 2017, a series of protests took place in St. Louis, Missouri, following the acquittal of former St. Louis police officer Jason Stockley in the shooting of Anthony Lamar Smith, a black man. Over 160 people were arrested during the first three days of demonstrations, with largely peaceful protests. There has been significant criticism around the police and governmental response to protests, resulting in lawsuits from the ACLU.

== Timeline of events ==
=== September 15 ===
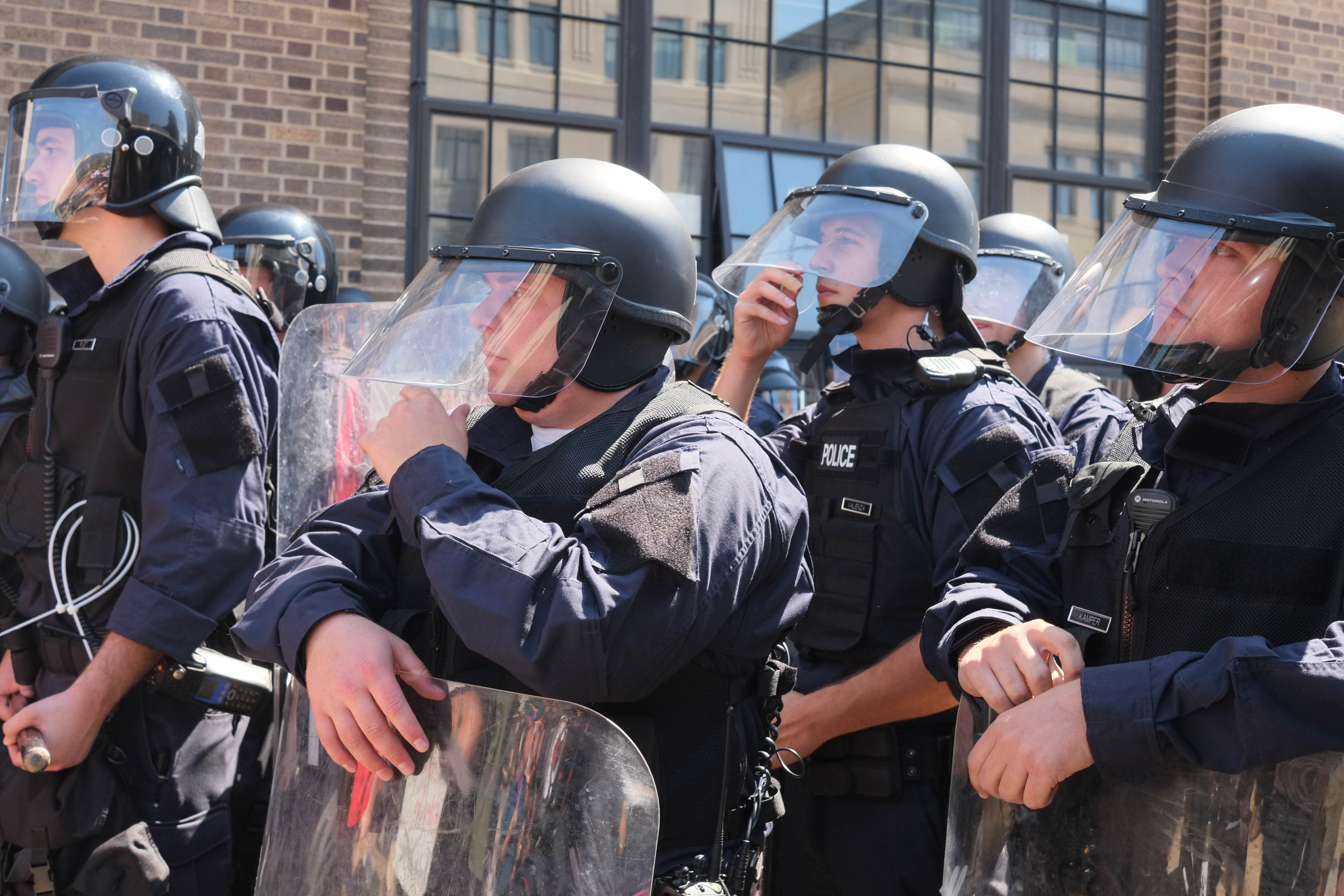
Police at 2017 St. Louis protests

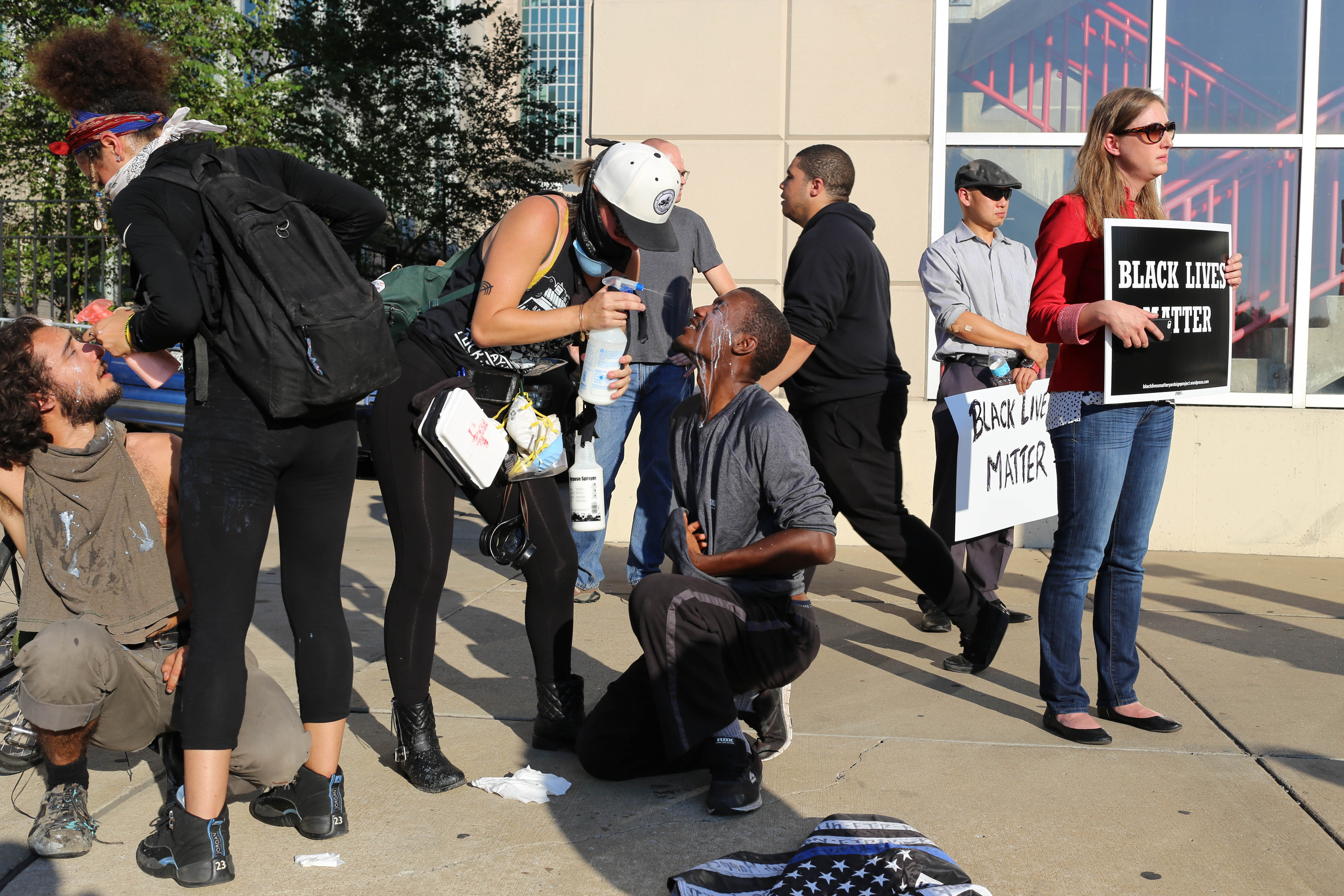
Eye wash station for protesters

Roughly 200-300 demonstrators assembled in downtown St. Louis near the city courthouse. The protests were mostly peaceful. Police used pepper spray to drive back protesters on at least two occasions: after protesters responded angrily to the approach of buses filled with police in tactical armor (riot gear), and after individuals mounted an abandoned police vehicle and damaged its windshield.

Demonstrations later moved to the Central West End neighborhood, where they swelled to over 1,000 people. They were peaceful until about 9:45 pm, after protesters made their way to the home of mayor Lyda Krewson. Despite urgings from demonstration leaders, at least one protester put a rock through the mayor's window. The mayor is believed not to have been home. Although most demonstrators dispersed immediately, police deployed pepper spray and tear gas, driving back remaining demonstrators and onlookers through the Central West End's commercial area. There, angered protesters damaged several businesses.

A total of 33 people, 32 of whom were local, were arrested and charged with crimes ranging from peace disturbance to destruction of property. The US Justice Department announced that no federal investigation will take place.

=== September 16 ===
On the afternoon of September 16, protesters marched through a shopping center in the St. Louis suburb of Des Peres and blocked a road. As the sun set a peaceful march made its way through the St. Louis suburb of University City. As night fell, however, demonstrators threw projectiles at police and smashed storefront windows as police drove them down Delmar Boulevard. 23 businesses and a police vehicle were damaged. Police made nine arrests.

=== September 17 ===
About 1,000 people protested outside police headquarters in downtown St. Louis. The event was peaceful until a small group of protesters started smashing the windows of a Marriott hotel and other businesses. Police arrested 123 people. Police also said unknown chemical substances were thrown at them and that an officer on bike was taken to the hospital for non-life-threatening injuries. Among those arrested included an undercover St. Louis police officer, a Getty Images photojournalist, and an Air Force lieutenant.

=== September 19 ===
Protestors gathered outside the downtown St. Louis jail.

=== September 21 ===
Police in Richmond Heights shut down the St. Louis Galleria after a group of protesters blocked the intersection of Brentwood Boulevard and Galleria Parkway. Protests started outside Busch Stadium in downtown St Louis, as a Billy Joel concert took place.

=== September 23 ===
Protesters marched through the Saint Louis Galleria in Richmond Heights before St. Louis County Police said it ordered the demonstrators to disperse. Police made 22 arrests. One officer and two protesters were injured during the incident. Some protesters alleged that the police did not give the dispersal order.

=== September 29 ===
A group of protesters attending a baseball game between the St. Louis Cardinals and the Milwaukee Brewers at Busch Stadium unfurled a banner which depicted a cardinal, to match St. Louis' baseball mascot, with #ExpectUs written across the bird's jersey and the bird holding a "Black Lives Matter" sign, and read at the bottom "Stop Killing Us." The protesters were removed from the stadium by police. At least two protesters were arrested as ongoing demonstrations outside Busch Stadium continued as well.

=== September 30 ===
Protesters returned to the St Louis Galleria, though only briefly, and chanted "Black lives matter" and "If we don't get it, shut it down!" while marching through the mall. They also addressed shoppers and onlookers.

=== October 3 ===
143 were arrested after a group of protesters blocked and briefly closed the eastbound lanes of Interstate 64 at Kingshighway. This marks the highest total number of arrests in one night since the protests began.

=== October 4 ===
On this day, and made public October 6, local U.S. Attorney Carrie Costantin sent a letter to US Justice Department's Civil Rights Division asking to implement a request by St. Louis Mayor Lyda Krewson and Interim Police Commissioner Lawrence M. O'Toole for an independent federal investigation.

=== October 5 ===
A group of protestors blocked traffic at Hampton Avenue and Chippewa Street on Thursday evening before marching to the nearby St. Louis Police Officers Association and calling for its spokesman to be fired.

=== October 6 ===
Protests returned to the nearby city of Ferguson three years after the shooting of Michael Brown. The Ferguson protesters first stopped outside the Ferguson Market, where Brown had a run-in with the store owner before he was stopped by the officer who later shot him, and later moved to the Ferguson police headquarters on South Florissant Road. A video of Ferguson protestors carrying Black Lives Matter signs and standing around the burning flag while repeatedly chanting "we can't take it no more" is also leaking online as well.

=== October 13 ===
More Ferguson protests take place and 5 out of 50 protesters are arrested for refusing to obey two or three police warnings to leave the street in front the police headquarters and move onto the sidewalk 40 minutes after protests begin at night.

=== October 14 ===
200 peaceful protestors march through the streets of downtown St. Louis in the afternoon.

=== October 21 ===
Protesters accompany State Representative Bruce Franks to the AFL–CIO Convention in downtown St. Louis. The convention center staff refused entry to the demonstrators, including Rep. Franks, who was scheduled to speak. Trade unionists attending the conference joined the demonstration and demanded that all protesters be given entry.

=== November 24 ===
Seven protestors, including Franks, were arrested following an attempt to disrupt Black Friday sales at the St. Louis Galleria. About 50 protesters arrived shortly after 2 p.m., forcing the mall to close for less than an hour at 2:40 p.m. The mall reopened 3:20 p.m. after most protestors had left the vicinity.

== Reactions ==
Acting Police Commissioner Lawrence O'Toole spoke about the protests in a video statement with Mayor Lyda Krewson. He stated, "Many of the demonstrators were peaceful. However, after dark, many agitators began to destroy property and assault police officers." The mayor herself earlier stated, "I am sobered by this outcome. Frustration, anger, hurt, pain, hope and love all intermingle. I encourage St. Louisans to show each other compassion, to recognize that we all have different experiences and backgrounds and that we all come to this with real feelings and experiences." Missouri Governor Eric Greitens warned protesters they could be arrested for property damage if further violence occurred. He issued a strong condemnation Saturday night in a Facebook post stating, "In the past, our leaders let people break windows, loot, start fires. They let them do it. Not this time. Tonight, the police arrested the vandals. At this moment, they're all sitting in a jail cell. They're gonna wake up and face felony charges. These aren't protesters, these are criminals. We had leaders who wanted to give people a safe space to loot and to burn. Now in Missouri if you loot the only safe space you're going to have is in a jail cell."

Irish rock band U2 as well as singer Ed Sheeran cancelled concerts in St. Louis due to the unrest. The St. Louis Walk to End Alzheimer's, the Shakespeare Festival's performance of 'Blow, Winds', the Cardinals Care 6K Walk/Run, Mike Birbiglia's stand-up performance at The Pageant, the Missouri History Museum's Twilight Tuesday concert series, the School of Rock show at Delmar Hall, and the St. Louis Symphony's performance of Harry Potter and the Chamber of Secrets - In Concert were all cancelled due to the protests as well. PeaceFest at the Harris-Stowe State University campus, The Mission: St. Louis gala at Ballpark Village, the 45th Annual Moonlight Ramble and the opening of the St Louis Science Center's exhibit "Science Uncorked" were all also postponed.

On September 22, 2017, the American Civil Liberties Union (ACLU) sued the city of St. Louis over its treatment of the protesters.
