= Francis Slay =

American politician and lawyer

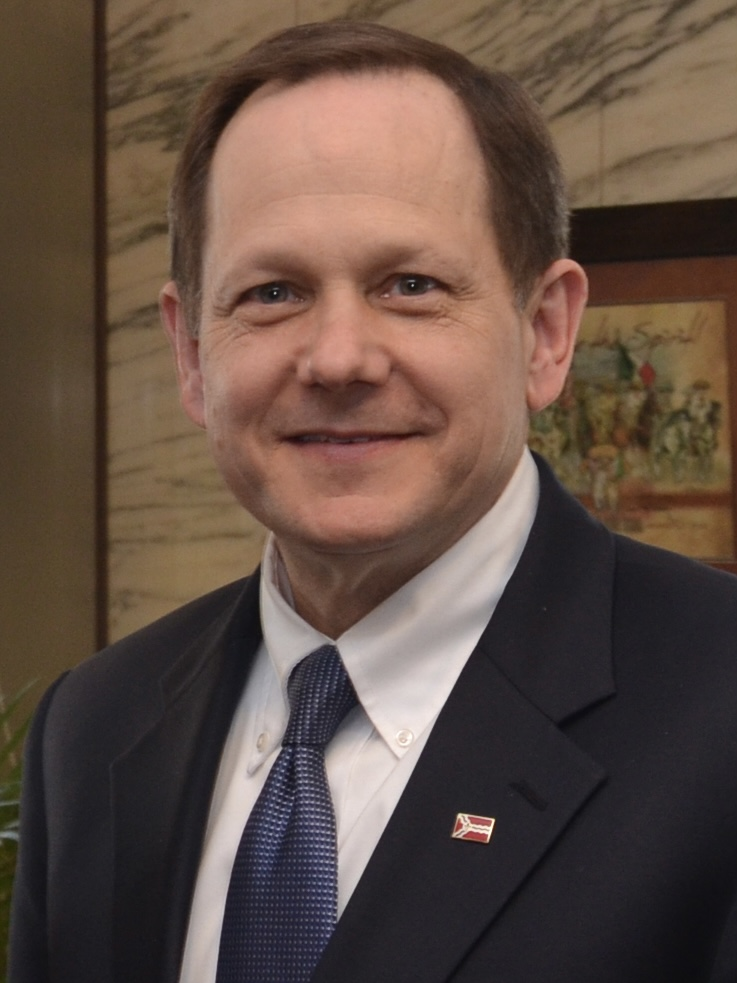
- Slay in 2015

45th Mayor of St. Louis
- In office April 17, 2001 – April 18, 2017
- Preceded by: Clarence Harmon
- Succeeded by: Lyda Krewson

Personal details
- Born: March 18, 1955 (age 71) St. Louis, Missouri, U.S.
- Party: Democratic
- Spouse: Kim Slay
- Children: 2
- Education: Quincy College (BA); Saint Louis University (JD)
- Profession: Attorney

Francis Gerard Slay (born March 18, 1955) is an American politician and lawyer who served as the 45th Mayor of St. Louis, Missouri from 2001 to 2017. The first mayor of the city of St. Louis to be elected to the office four consecutive times, Slay is the longest-serving mayor in St. Louis history. He is a member of the Democratic Party. He is to date the last male mayor of St. Louis.

== Education and early career ==
Slay graduated from St. Mary's High School in 1973. He received a degree in political science from Quincy University and a J.D. degree from Saint Louis University School of Law. After graduating from law school, Slay served as a law clerk for Judge Paul J. Simon of the Missouri Court of Appeals for the Eastern District. In 1981, he joined the law firm of Guilfoil, Petzall, and Shoemake where he specialized in business law and commercial litigation. Slay was elected to the St. Louis Board of Aldermen in 1985, representing the 23rd ward. In 1995, he was elected President of the Board of Aldermen, and in 1999 was re-elected without opposition.

== Term as mayor ==
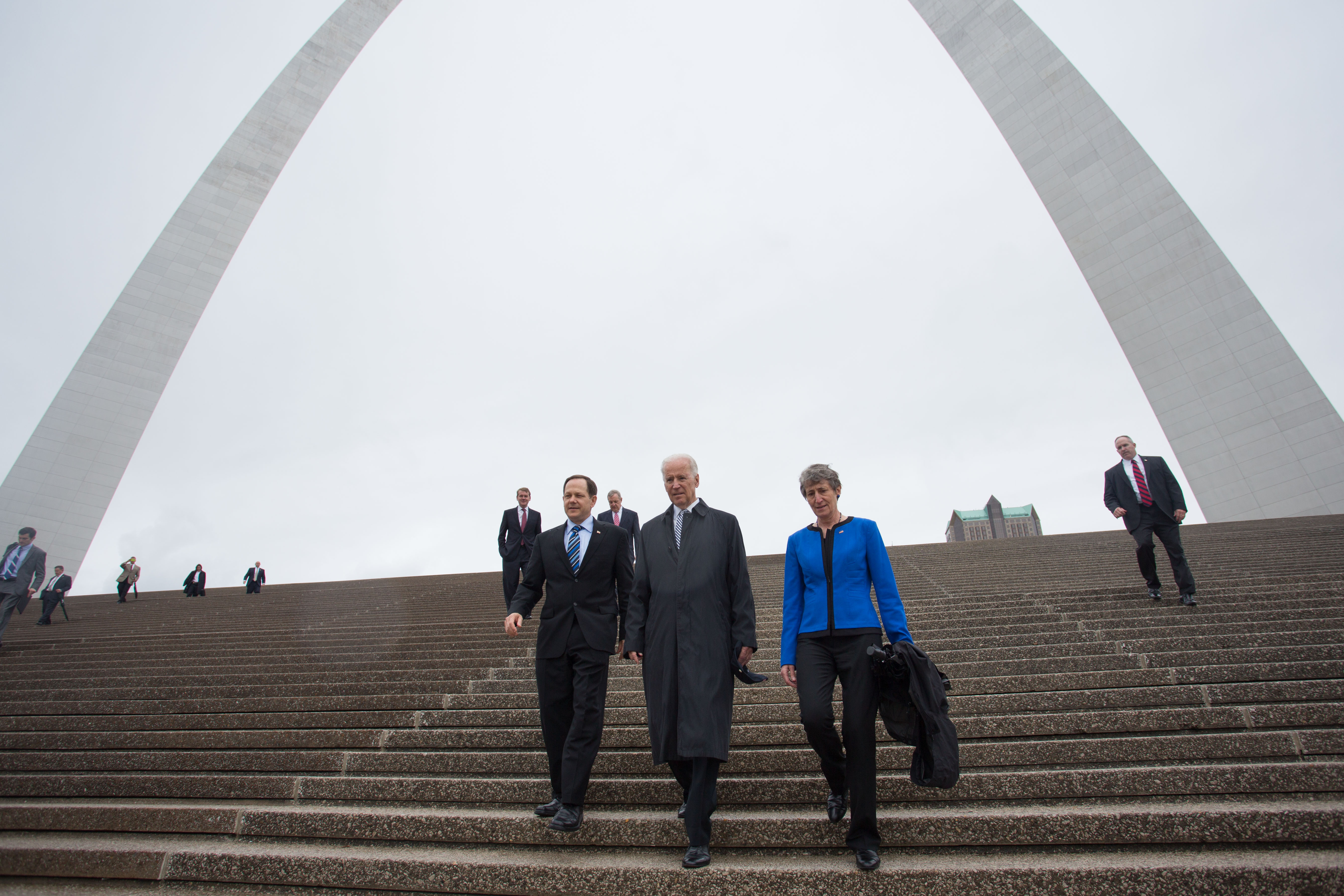
Slay walks down the steps of the Gateway Arch alongside Vice President Joe Biden and Secretary of the Interior Sally Jewell in May 2014

Slay defeated incumbent mayor Clarence Harmon and former mayor Freeman Bosley Jr. in the Democratic Primary in 2001. During his first term, he oversaw significant residential redevelopment within the city, including the redevelopment of the Washington Avenue Loft District. Slay then negotiated the construction of Busch Stadium, the new St. Louis Cardinals baseball stadium in downtown St. Louis, and the re-districting of aldermanic wards required after the 2000 census. The Slay administration and its public and private partners have received national and international recognition for St. Louis's renaissance. In May 2007, Downtown St. Louis's revitalization was the subject of a Preserve America Presidential Award, the nation's highest award for historic preservation. In 2011, Citygarden won the Urban Land Institute's prestigious Amanda Burden Urban Open Space award. During his term as mayor, he hired Dianne White Clatto as a special assistant.

He announced on April 8, 2016, that he would not seek another term as mayor, though he remains the longest-serving mayor of the City of St. Louis as of 2026.

== Post-mayor ==
Slay accepted a job as an attorney with the Spencer Fane law firm, at their office in downtown St. Louis prior to his term ending on April 18, 2017

== Family ==
Slay is the second of eleven children. His father, Francis R. Slay, was affiliated with St. Raymond's Maronite Catholic Cathedral in St. Louis, and was the long-time Democratic Committeeman in the 23rd Ward, and who once served as Recorder of Deeds. Francis R. Slay died on March 16, 2011, aged 83.

Slay and his wife Kim have two children and three rescued dogs. Slay is a Maronite Catholic and also a supporter of the Archdiocese of St. Louis and of Catholic organizations in the city. He is of Lebanese and Polish ancestry.

== See also ==
- 2001 St. Louis mayoral election
- 2005 St. Louis mayoral election
- 2009 St. Louis mayoral election
- 2013 St. Louis mayoral election

Timeline of St. Louis

Political offices
Preceded by Clarence Harmon	Mayor of St. Louis; 2001–2017	Succeeded by Lyda Krewson
