= St. Louis Metropolitan Police Department =

Law enforcement agency in St. Louis City, Missouri, US

Coordinates: 38°37′55.038″N 90°12′27.7488″W

Metropolitan Police Department – City of St. Louis
- The current Seal of the Metropolitan Police Department

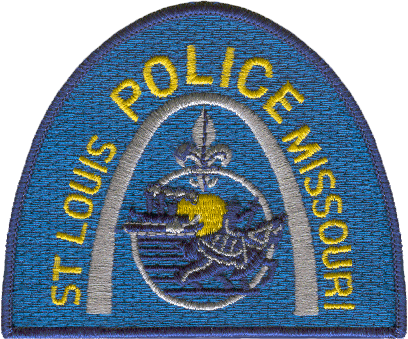
- The current patch of the Metropolitan Police Department

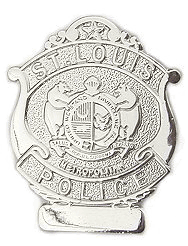
- SLMPD officer badge, with number omitted.

- Flag of City of St. Louis
- Common name: City of St. Louis Police Department
- Abbreviation: SLMPD
- Motto: Officium moris principatum et aequi Omnibus (Latin); Service, Integrity, Leadership, and Fair Treatment to All

Agency overview
- Formed: 1808; 218 years ago
- Employees: ▲2000 full-time (2026)
- Annual budget: US$241,500,000 [FY 2026]

Jurisdictional structure
- Operations jurisdiction: St. Louis, Missouri, United States
- Jurisdiction of the Metropolitan Police Department
- Area: 69.99 square miles (181.3 km^{2}) (total) (land)
- Population: 273,541 (2026)
- Legal jurisdiction: City of St. Louis
- General nature: Local civilian police

Operational structure
- Overseen by: St. Louis City Board of Police Commissioners
- Headquarters: 1915 Olive Downtown West, St. Louis
- Police Officers: ▼926(2025)
- Corrections personnel and Civilian members: ▼373 (2025)
- Commissioners responsible: Chris Saracino, President; Sonya Jenkins-Gray, Vice-President
- Agency executive: Robert J. Tracy, Police Commissioner/Chief
- Bureaus: 4: Bureau of Crime Control Strategies; Bureau of Professional Standards; Bureau of Support Operations; Bureau of Operations
- Patrol Divisions: 3: South Patrol; Central Patrol; North Patrol

Facilities
- Stations: 3 Patrol Stations, 6 sub-stations
- Justice Centers: City Justice Center 200 S.Tucker Blvd. St. Louis, Missouri
- Marked and Unmarked vehicles: 2000+
- Helicopter/Airplanes: 6 Helicopter, 1 Fixed Wing
- Horses: 4
- K-9's: 8

Notables
- Anniversary: August 7, 1808; (218 years ago)

Website
- Metropolitan Police Department official website

The Metropolitan Police Department – City of St. Louis (also known as the SLMPD or St. Louis Police) is the primary law enforcement agency for the city of St. Louis, Missouri.

According to the Mapping Police Violence dataset, SLMPD has the highest police use of deadly force per capita. The SLMPD union has strongly resisted attempts to establish independent oversight of police misconduct. When Kimberly Gardner, the top prosecutor in St. Louis, sought to establish a unit within her office to independently investigate police misconduct, the leader of the SLMPD union said Gardner should be removed "by force or by choice."

== History ==
The Metropolitan Police Department was established on August 7, 1808, five years after St. Louis became part of the United States. The department was created with only four officers, who received no pay. Able-bodied men age 18 and older were required to patrol for four months of the year. This was the only police system for the next 10 years. Refusal to serve on patrol carried a fine of $1.

In 2013, Commission on Accreditation for Law Enforcement Agencies recognized the Metropolitan Police Department with it distinguished Tri-Arc Award. The Tri-Arc Award is reserved for those police agencies that have successfully accredited their law enforcement services, police academy and communications division.

The SLMPD is under the Direction of the St. Louis City Board of Police Commissioners. With approximately 1,343 officers and 462 civilian staff, it is the 37th largest municipal police department in the United States. The department serves an area of 69 square miles (180 km^{2}) and a population of over 294,890 people. Established on August 7, 1808, the SLMPD is one of the oldest police departments in the United States. The Metropolitan Police is the second largest municipal police agency in Missouri, based on number of employees, city population, and geographic area served.

MPD headquarters at 1915 Olive St, was opened in 2014.

=== Fallen officers ===
From April 28, 1836, to September 22, 2024, the Officer Down Memorial Page reported that 174 officers in the St. Louis Metropolitan Police Department have died in the line of duty.

=== Demographics ===
The composition of the department's total personnel, according to the 2020 annual report, was:

- Sex — Male: 83.54%, Female: 16.46%
- Race — White: 66.0%, African-American/Black: 30%, Other: 3.51%

=== Salary ===
Starting salary for a Metropolitan police officer is $53,196, increasing to a maximum of $190,387.

=== Union representation ===
Officers are represented by the St. Louis Police Officers Association (SLPOA). SLPOA employs author and former Arnold police officer Jeff Roorda as business manager. In the 2017 city mayoral election, incumbent Lyda Krewson called for Roorda to be fired due to social media comments directed at candidate Tishaura Jones and declared that he would not be welcomed in her office if elected.

The St. Louis Ethical Society of Police (ESOP), formerly known as St. Louis Black Police Officers Association until 1975, represents African American police officers by providing legal counsel and other benefits; however, the SLPOA is the only recognized bargaining unit for officers.

=== Controversies ===
Officers with the SLMPD have been convicted in instances of police misconduct, obstruction of justice, violations of civil rights, and have been accused of racial prejudice. Several of these incidents resulted in criminal charges against SLMPD officers, and some cases have resulted in guilty pleas.

==== Homicide of Kerwin Harris (2012) ====
In December 2012, St. Louis medical examiner ruled the death of Kerwin Harris, age 39, as accidental, caused primarily by heart disease. Officer Steven Pinkerton allegedly mistook Harris for a robbery suspect as a black man wearing glasses and knit hat driving a Buick Century. His family, including four children, were not allowed to see his body and received no details about his death until interviewed for a 2024 Missouri Independent investigation. The investigation revealed that Harris was strangled in a chokehold and tazed repeatedly by officers. Harris was not involved in the $109 Denny's robbery, a case which is still open.

==== Shooting of Anthony Lamar Smith (2017) ====
See: Shooting of Anthony Lamar Smith

==== Assault of undercover officer Luther Hall (2018) ====
Three St. Louis police officers from its Civil Disobedience Team were charged with felony assault against undercover police officer Luther Hall during the 2017 St. Louis protests. Officer Hall, according to the November 2018 indictment, had been extensively assaulted by the three officers. According to the prosecutors, officers Christopher Myers, Randy Hays, and Dustin Boone used excessive force in the form of kicking Hall and beating him with their police batons. Hall stated that the officers smashed his cell phone and broke a camera he had used to document the protests. Hall's injuries as a result of the assault included an injured tailbone, two herniated discs, and a jaw injury that prevented Hall from eating, resulting in a twenty-pound weight loss. Prosecutors obtained text messages from the officers involved, which revealed the officers' excitement at the prospect of brutalizing protesters. Officer Boone allegedly texted "it's gonna be a lot of fun beating the hell out of those shitheads once the sun goes down and nobody can tell us apart!!!!" and "Did everyone see the protesters getting FUCKED UP in the galleria????? That was awesome."

A fourth police officer, Bailey Colletta, was charged with providing false testimony to a grand jury. Colletta pled guilty to giving false testimony to cover up the attack on Hall, and admitted she had lied to the FBI and to a federal grand jury.

All four officers were suspended without pay.

Officer Hays, who allegedly had texted "going rogue does feel good", pled guilty to assault. Hays admitted that on the evening of September 17, although Hays did not witness anything probable cause to arrest Hall, Hays and other officers arrested Hall. During the arrest, Hall was compliant and pinned to the ground, with Officer Boone's knee on Hall's shoulder and continually pushing down Hall's head while telling him not to look at them; during this time, officers kicked Hall in the face and beat him with a baton.

An indictment released in December 2019 revealed that a fifth officer, Steve Korte, was also charged for violently beating Hall, and then lying to the FBI about his involvement. He was placed on administrative leave without pay. Officer Korte was later unanimously found not guilty by the jury, after evidence was shown in trial proving he was nowhere near Luther Hall when he was attacked. Officer Korte was later reinstated by the St. Louis Metropolitan Police Department.

Hall filed a federal civil rights lawsuit in September 2019 against the police and against the city.

==== "Exclusion List" controversy (2019–2020) ====
A controversy ensued in 2019 regarding the existence of a list created by circuit attorney Kimberly M. Gardner's office of 28 Metropolitan Department officers that were to be excluded from acting as witnesses in future prosecutions due to an alleged history of misconduct. In late September 2020, fifteen more officers were added to the list. This would indicate about five percent of the sworn officers of the department are listed. The names of those on the list has not been released to the public.

==== "Russian Roulette" incident (2019) ====
On January 24, police arrived at the residence of SLMPD officer Nathaniel Hendren following reports of gunshots, upon arrival police found 24-year-old officer Katlyn Alix fatally shot in the chest, following an alleged game of Russian roulette. St. Louis circuit attorney Kimberly Gardner criticized the investigation, stating that the department was obstructing the investigation of the shooting, claiming investigators refused to allow a sample of Officer Hendren's blood be tested for alcohol and other substances. St. Louis Metropolitan Police Chief John Hayden Jr. responded to criticism of the investigation as unfounded.

==== Plain View Project findings (2019) ====
In June 2019 officers and employees from numerous police departments in the United States were found to have participated in a number of private groups on Facebook that shared content that was described as racist, violent, and Islamophobic. This information was published online by the Plain View Project, which had viewed and documented the social-media accounts of 2,900 officers from eight separate departments, finding twenty percent of those users posted material that was determined to meet the threshold of being offensive. At least 22 officers in the department were found to have participated in the closed groups, St. Louis Circuit Attorney Kimberly M. Gardner stated that these officers would be added to a list of officers who have been determined to be unable to provide witness testimony in criminal prosecutions.

==== Central Visual and Performing Arts High School shooting (2022) ====
On October 24, 2022, a mass shooting occurred at Central Visual and Performing Arts High School in the Southwest Garden neighborhood of St. Louis, Missouri, United States when a 19-year-old former student opened fire on students and staff, killing two and injuring seven before being fatally shot by police.

==== Police cruiser crashes (2023-2024) ====
In December 2023, the aftermath of a police cruiser crashing into a gay bar gained national attention following the arrest and alleged assault of one of the bar owners. Claims as to the cause of the crash were contradicted by video evidence gathered from civilians, no toxicology test was taken for the driver, and the initial charge of a felony against the arrested bar owner was reduced to a misdemeanor after he was held more than a day in custody. It was also found that the arresting officer, who is accused of beating the bar owner, had previously broken bones of an arrestee already in handcuffs. Governor Mike Parson advised the police department to release body camera footage.

The incident increased scrutiny of cruiser crashes, including an apparent cover-up of a destroyed church sign from the preceding summer. In March 2024, the St. Louis Board of Aldermen were told by a police representative that there was no recent upswing in incidents, which conflicted with data showing a 44% spike in 2019.

==== Force Investigative Unit audit (2024) ====
The Force Investigative Unit was established in 2013 to investigate cases of officers using deadly force and issue reports to the public for the purposes of transparency. In 2018, the unit was ordered to conduct an audit of investigations which led to further investigations of the unit's then-director Roger Engelhardt, who was later fired from the force. The audit found problems in all 50 investigations of police shootings from 2004-2018. No reports from the unit have been released to the public since 2015, and the Tishaura Jones administration blocked public access to the full audit.

== Office of the Police Commissioner ==
The Office of the Police Commissioner has the responsibility of assisting the Police commissioner-Chief of Police in the administration of the department. This includes the Chief of Staff, Public Communications, and Employee Relations, as well as the Community Safety Partnership Bureau.

Commissioner Robert J. Tracy is the 36th individual to hold the post as Police Commissioner .

The Police Commissioner serves as the senior sworn member of the SLMPD. Prior to 1806, the position was known as the chief inspector and as the chief of police." The Chief of Police is the overall person in charge of the police department.

== Ranks and insignia ==
Title	Insignia	Shirt Color	Badge Color	Information
Police Commissioner		White	Gold	The Police Commissioner is appointed by the St. Louis City Board of Police Commissioners.This is the Highest rank in the St. Louis police Department.
Lieutenant Colonel		White	Gold	Lieutenant Colonel's are in charge of a Bureau.
Major		White	Gold	Majors are in charge of a Patrol Division.
Captain		White	Gold	Captains are in-command of a station.
Lieutenant		White	Gold	Lieutenants are assigned to geographic patrol and detective divisions and are responsible for supervising patrol sergeants, police officers and detectives who carry out day-to-day, routine crime suppression and investigative functions
Sergeant		Light Blue	Silver w/ Gol-Ray panels	Sergeants are responsible for the direct supervision of their patrol division and the conduct, appearance and performance of personnel assigned under their command.
Police Officer/Detective	No Insignia	Light Blue	Silver	Police Officers/Detectives Perform duties within a specific area to protect life and property, and enforce laws and ordinances using tactful and courteous treatment of the public and conscientious and efficient performance of duties.
Probationary Police Officer	No Insignia	Light Blue	Silver	Following graduation from the academy, officers receive the title Probationary Police Officer (PPO) for twelve months until being promoted to Police Officer.
Police Cadet	No Insignia	Light Gray	No Badge	The goal of the program is to provide interested individuals between the ages of 18 and 20½ with paid, on the job training and exposure to various police department units; the opportunity to earn course credit; and the foundation to be successful and well-prepared upon entering the St. Louis Police Academy once turning 20½.

Police Officer (Trainee) is the initial rank of oncoming Metropolitan Police officers, held while undergoing training at the Metropolitan Police Academy.

=== Police Commissioner ===
Police Commissioner of the Metropolitan Police Department – City of St. Louis is an office held by the highest-ranking member of the Metropolitan Police Department. St. Louis has had 36 police chiefs (including interim chiefs) since 1861. For a full list of past and current police chiefs, visit the Commissioner of the St. Louis Metropolitan Police Department page.

=== Lieutenant Colonel ===
Lieutenant Colonels command the Bureaus of Professional Standards, Support Operations, and Operations and Crime Control Strategies.

- Lieutenant Colonel Renee Kriesmann, Commander, Bureau of Operations
- Lieutenant Colonel Michael Sack, Commander, Bureau of Professional Standards
- Lieutenant Colonel Eric Larson, Commander, Bureau of Crime Control Strategies
- Lieutenant Colonel Ryan Cousins, Commander, Bureau of Support Operations

=== Majors ===
The rank of Major is the third-highest rank in the Department, reporting directly to a Lieutenant Colonel. Each Major serves as a member of the Senior Command staff and assists each Lieutenant Colonel in managing civilian and commissioned personnel within their assigned areas.

- Major Latricia Allen, Commander of the Bureau of Investigative Services
- Major Janice Bockstruck, Commander of the Bureau of Professional Standards
- Major Joseph Morici, Office of the Commissioner
- Major Michael Mueller, Commander of the Bureau of Specialized Enforcement
- Major Donnell Moore, Commander of the North Patrol Division
- Major Edward Benoist, Commander of the Central Patrol Division
- Major Christi Marks, Commander of the South Patrol Division

=== Police Officer ===
All potential candidates for the position of Police Officer must undergo a written examination, oral board panel and review, physical agility testing, psychological screening, drug testing and intensive background investigation. The number of candidates accepted is less than 25 percent of overall applicants. New officers are hired as probationary employees at the rank of Police Trainee. Upon successful completion of the six-month police academy, they are appointed as a probationary Police Officer. Upon successful completion of 3 months of field training and an additional 1-year probationary period, they attain their full rank.

== Police Fleet ==
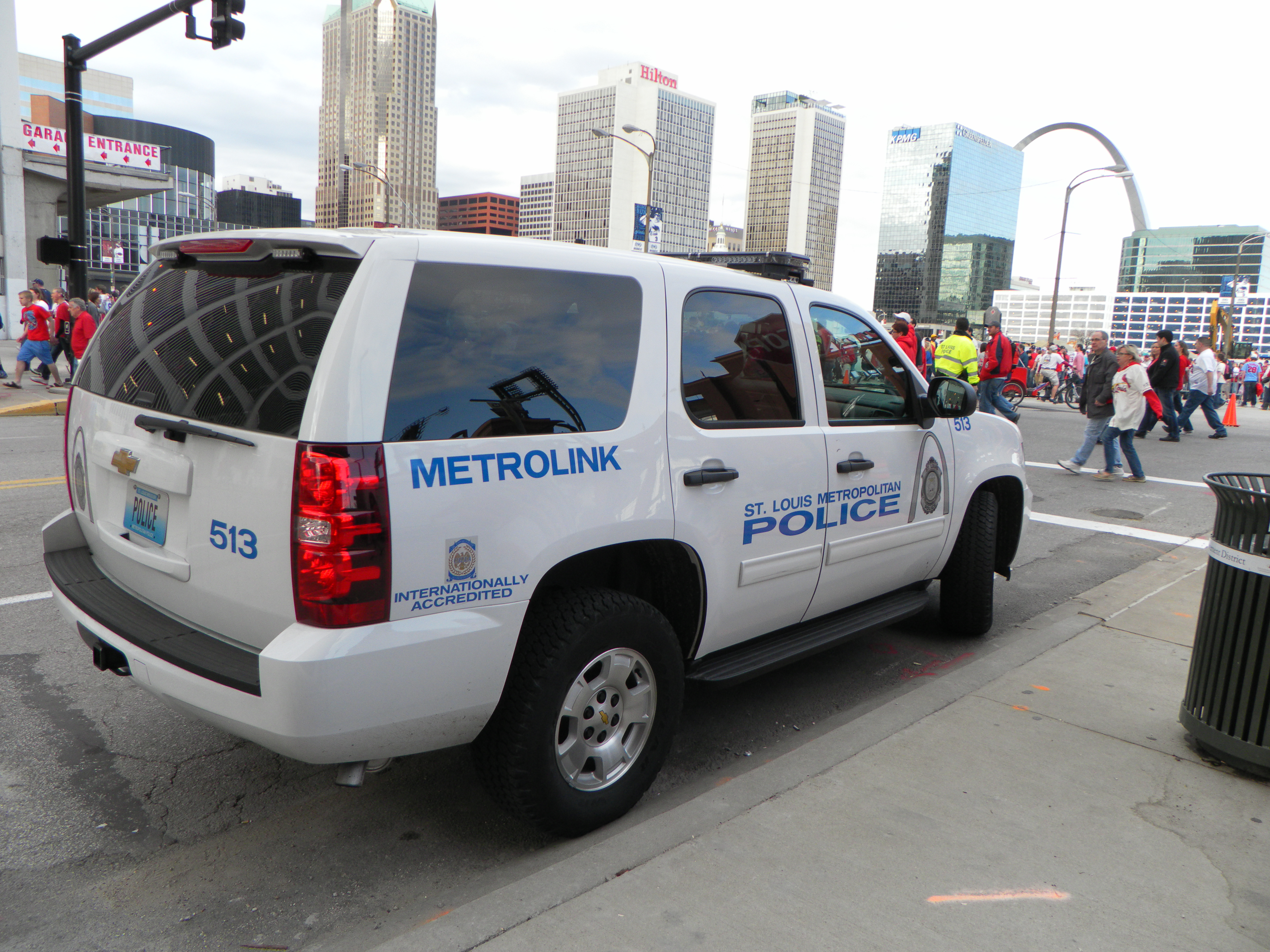
A Chevrolet Tahoe of SLMPD's MetroLink patrol unit

The department utilizes a variety of vehicles, including the Ford Police Interceptor, Ford Crown Victoria Police Interceptor (CVPI), the Dodge Charger, the Chevrolet Tahoe, the Chevrolet Silverado 1500 and 2500 series, the Chevrolet Impala 9C1, the Chevrolet Caprice, and the Ford F-150 and F-250. Both regularly marked and slicktop vehicles are used frequently. Each officer is issued the Beretta 92D 9mm handgun which has been standard issue since 1992. As of 2017 it was reported that the department would be getting new 9mm Beretta pistols to replace the currently issued aging 92D.

Patrol cars

- Chevrolet Impala
- Chevrolet Tahoe
- 2017 Explorer (DWI Enforcement)
- Chevrolet Malibu

Miscellaneous

- John Deere Gator
- Police Motorcycle
- Bicycles
- Ford Super Duty

Special Weapons & Tactics

- Lenco BearCat
- S.W.A.T Mobile Command
- Chevrolet Tahoe
- Chevrolet Step-Van
- 2023 Explorer

== Bureaus ==
The department is divided into five bureaus which are typically commanded by a Major. The bureaus fit under four umbrellas: Crime Control Strategies, Support Operations, and Professional Standards and Operations. Bureaus are often subdivided into smaller divisions and units

Bureau	Commander	Description	Subdivisions
Bureau of Operations	Lieutenant Colonel Renee Kriesmann	The Bureau of Operations is the largest bureau within the department.	The Bureau of Operations comprises six districts which are grouped into the North, South and Central patrols and the Housing Unit, Specialized Enforcement, Investigative Services .
Bureau of Crime Control Strategies	Lieutenant Colonel Eric Larson	The Bureau of Crime Control Strategies is responsible for investigating crimes and preventing them.	The Bureau of Crime Control Strategies comprises Intelligence, Information Technology, Real Time Crime Center, Crime Analysis and Cyber Crime, Operational Planning, Environmental Investigations, Gun Crime Intelligence Center, Federal Task Force Officers.
Bureau of Support Operations	Lieutenant Colonel Ryan Cousins	The Bureau of Support Operations is responsible for supporting the uniformed police officers and other personnel within the department.	The Bureau of Support Services comprises Planning & Research and Private Security and CALEA, Asset Removal, Laboratory/Identification, Emergency Management, Special Projects, Cadet Program, Fleet Services.
Bureau of Professional Standards	Lieutenant Colonel Michael Sack	The Bureau of Professional Standards is responsible for investigating personnel who may have violated department procedures and regulations.	The Bureau of Professional Standards comprises Internal Affairs and Force Investigation Unit and Body Worn Camera, Secondary Employment.

== Bureau of Operations ==
The City of St. Louis is divided geographically into three area patrol stations and six police districts and 6 substations. Each patrol division is commanded by a major and each district is commanded by a captain.

Police District	Police Captain
1 Commander of District One	Joseph Lankford
2 Commander of District Two	Thomas Zipf, Jr.
3 Commander of District Three	Angela Dickerson
4 Commander of District Four	Christian Stamper
5 Commander of District Five	JD McCloskey
6 Commander of District Six	Matthew Karnowski

Division number	District Commander	District name	Neighborhoods served
One and Two	Major Christi Marks	South Patrol	which includes the neighborhoods of Bevo Mill, Boulevard Heights, Carondelet, Carondelet Park, Holly Hills, Mount Pleasant, Patch, Princeton Heights, South Hampton, Botanical Gardens, Cheltenham, Clayton/Tamm, Clifton Heights, Ellendale, Forest Park, Forest Park Southeast, Franz Park, Hi-Point, Kings Oak, Lindenwood Park, McRee Town, North Hampton, Shaw, Southwest Garden, St. Louis Hills, The Hill, Tiffany, Tower Grove Park, Tower Grove South, Wilmore Park, Wydown/Skinker and portions of Dutchtown.
Three and Four	Major Edward Benoist	Central Patrol	which includes the neighborhoods of Benton Park, Benton Park West, Compton Heights, Fox Park, Gravois Park, Kosciusko, Lafayette Square, Lasalle, Marine Villa, McKinley Heights, Peabody/Darst/Webbe, Soulard, The Gate District, Tower Grove East, Carr Square, Columbus Square, Covenant Blu-Grand Center, Downtown, Downtown West, Fairgrounds Park, Hyde Park, Jeff Vander Lou, Midtown, Old North St. Louis, St. Louis Place and portions of College Hill Fairgrounds, Near North Riverfront and Dutchtown.
Five and Six	Major Donnell Moore	North Patrol	which includes the neighborhoods of Academy, Central West End, DeBaliviere Place, Fountain Park, Hamilton Heights, Kingshighway West, Lewis Place, Skinker/DeBaliviere, The Ville, Vandeventer, Visitation Park, Wells/Goodfellow, West End and portions of the Greater Ville and Kingsway East, Baden, Mark Twain, Mark Twain/I-70 Industrial, North Point, North Riverfront, O'Fallon, O'Fallon Park, Penrose, Penrose Park, Riverview, Walnut Park East, Walnut Park West and portions of College Hill, Fairgrounds, Greater Ville, Kingsway East and Near North Riverfront.

== Television ==
The homicide detectives of SLMPD will be featured in A&E's reality series The First 48.

== See also ==
- List of law enforcement agencies in Missouri
