= Electoral history of Tishaura Jones =

List of elections featuring Tishaura Jones as a candidate

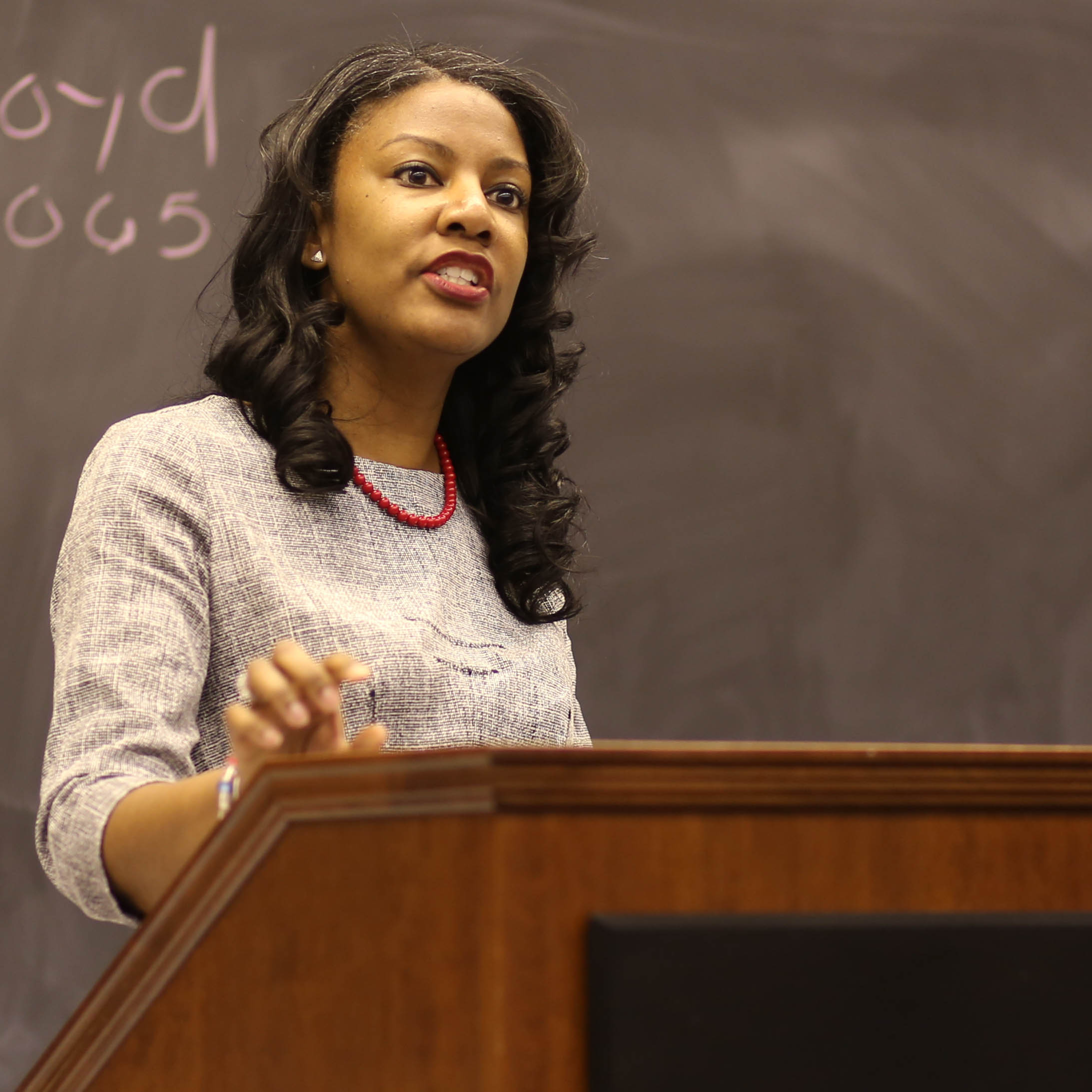
Jones running for Mayor of St. Louis in 2017

The electoral history of Tishaura Jones spans more than a decade. A member of the Democratic Party, Jones was first elected to the Missouri House of Representatives in 2008. In 2012, she was elected as Treasurer of St. Louis, a position she has since held through various elections and primaries. Jones ran for Mayor of St. Louis in 2017, but came in second to Lyda Krewson in the Democratic primary; Krewson would later win the general election and become the city's first female mayor. In 2020, following her election to a third term as treasurer, Jones announced she would once again run for mayor in the 2021 election, which was the city's first to use approval voting. Jones won that election over St. Louis Alderwoman Cara Spencer and became the 47th Mayor of St. Louis. In the 2025 election, Jones once again faced off against Spencer, this time losing by a substantial margin.

== Missouri House of Representatives ==
=== 2008 ===
2008 Missouri House of Representatives Democratic primary, 63rd district
Party	Candidate	Votes	%
Democratic	Tishaura Jones	1,577	54.0%
Democratic	April Harris	1,344	46.0%

2008 Missouri House of Representatives election, 63rd district
Party	Candidate	Votes	%
Democratic	Tishaura Jones	13,056	85.4%
Independent	Nels Williams	2,234	14.6%

=== 2010 ===
2010 Missouri House of Representatives Democratic primary, 63rd district
Party	Candidate	Votes	%
Democratic	Tishaura Jones (incumbent)	2,212	100.0%

2010 Missouri House of Representatives election, 63rd district
Party	Candidate	Votes	%
Democratic	Tishaura Jones (incumbent)	8,242	100.0%

== St. Louis Treasurer ==
=== 2012 ===
2012 St. Louis Treasurer Democratic primary
Party	Candidate	Votes	%
Democratic	Tishaura Jones	13,876	35.0%
Democratic	Fred Wessels Jr.	10,435	26.3%
Democratic	Jeffrey Boyd	10,127	25.5%
Democratic	Brian Wahby	5,269	13.3%

2012 St. Louis Treasurer election
Party	Candidate	Votes	%
Democratic	Tishaura Jones	105,457	77.9%
Republican	Tim Bachmann	24,237	17.9%
Green	Anthony Stevens	5,504	4.1%
Write-in		179	0.1%

=== 2016 ===
2016 St. Louis Treasurer Democratic primary
Party	Candidate	Votes	%
Democratic	Tishaura Jones (incumbent)	36,041	100.0%

2016 St. Louis Treasurer election
Party	Candidate	Votes	%
Democratic	Tishaura Jones (incumbent)	96,005	76.4%
Republican	Darren Grant	23,155	18.4%
Green	Jerome Bauer	6,231	5.0%
Write-in		293	0.2%

=== 2020 ===
2020 St. Louis Treasurer Democratic primary
Party	Candidate	Votes	%
Democratic	Tishaura Jones (incumbent)	40,577	58.5%
Democratic	Jeffrey Boyd	28,800	41.5%

2020 St. Louis Treasurer election
Party	Candidate	Votes	%
Democratic	Tishaura Jones (incumbent)	101,062	77.6%
Republican	Robert Vroman	26,267	20.2%
Green	Don De Vivo	2,697	2.1%
Write-in		187	0.1%

== Democratic Party committee ==
=== 2016 ===
2016 Democratic Party committee election, 26th ward
Party	Candidate	Votes	%
Democratic	Karla May	956	56.1%
Democratic	Tishaura Jones	731	42.9%
Write-in		16	0.9%

== St. Louis Mayor ==
=== 2017 ===
2017 St. Louis mayoral Democratic primary
Party	Candidate	Votes	%
Democratic	Lyda Krewson	17,253	32.0%
Democratic	Tishaura Jones	16,374	30.4%
Democratic	Lewis E. Reed	9,856	18.3%
Democratic	Antonio French	8,530	15.8%
Democratic	Jeffrey Boyd	1,439	2.7%
Democratic	Bill Haas	257	0.5%
Democratic	Jimmie Matthews	145	0.3%

=== 2021 ===
2021 St. Louis mayoral primary election
Party	Candidate	Votes	%
Nonpartisan	Tishaura Jones	25,374	57.0%
Nonpartisan	Cara Spencer	20,649	46.4%
Nonpartisan	Lewis E. Reed	17,162	38.5%
Nonpartisan	Andrew Jones	6,422	14.4%
Total votes		69,607	(Note: Because the primary election was conducted using approval voting (and voters had the opportunity to mark their approval of more than one candidate), the percentages add up to more than 100 percent.)

2021 St. Louis mayoral general election
Party	Candidate	Votes	%
Nonpartisan	Tishaura Jones	30,099	51.7%
Nonpartisan	Cara Spencer	27,819	47.8%
Write-in		319	0.6%
Total votes		58,237	100.00

=== 2025 ===
2025 St. Louis mayoral primary election
Party	Candidate	Votes	%
Nonpartisan	Cara Spencer	23,826	68.11%
Nonpartisan	Tishaura Jones	11,612	33.19%
Nonpartisan	Michael Butler	8,701	24.87%
Nonpartisan	Andrew Jones	4,769	13.63%
Total votes		48,908	

2025 St. Louis mayoral general election
Party	Candidate	Votes	%
Nonpartisan	Cara Spencer	32,162	64.15%
Nonpartisan	Tishaura Jones	17,974	35.85%
Total votes		50,137 (Note: One vote went to write-in candidate Jerome Bauer)	100.00
