= Medium Security Institution =

Former penitentiary operated by St. Louis Missouri

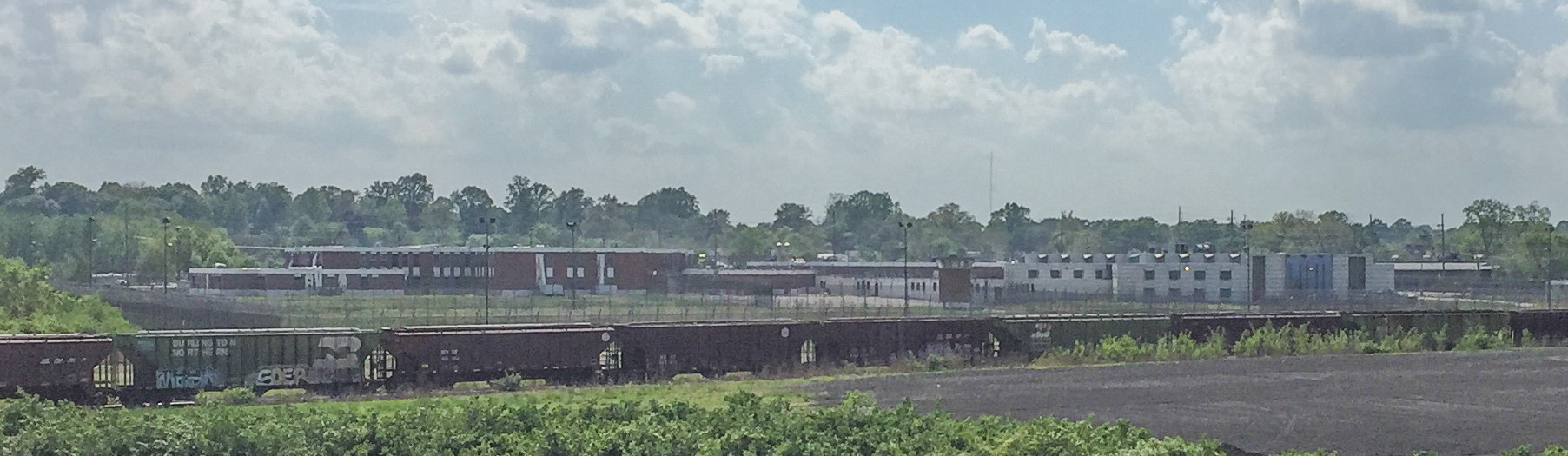
- Interactive map of Medium Security Institution
- Location: 7600 Hall St, St Louis, Missouri; 38°42′20″N 90°13′21″W
- Status: Defunct
- Security class: Medium
- Capacity: 1,138
- Population: 185 (August 7, 2021)
- Opened: 1966
- Closed: 2021
- Managed by: Public Safety Department - City of St. Louis
- Director: N/A

The Medium Security Institution, commonly referred to as The Workhouse, was a medium-security penitentiary located in St. Louis, Missouri, and was owned and operated by the municipal department of Public Safety and Corrections. Opened in 1966, the prison was long controversial for its poorly ventilated rooms, debt bondage, inadequate food, forced labor, and other human rights violations. On June 17, 2021, the jail was closed and its inmates moved to the City Justice Center. In 2025, after long debate, the building was demolished.

== History ==
Built in 1966, the prison gained its nickname "The Workhouse" from an 1840s city ordinance that allowed forced labor as a punishment for criminals sentenced in law court who couldn't pay their fines.

The Workhouse became infamous for its poor living conditions, prisoner abuse, and penal labor.

On July 4, 2018, Close the Workhouse, a prison-abolition group, held demonstrations outside city hall to protest the inhumane conditions of the prison.

In 2019, Arch City Defenders, a public defender organization, filed a class-action lawsuit against the facility's inhumane living condition. The lawsuit alleged that the civil rights of detainees within the facility had been violated by the poor sanitation, limited ventilation, and poor medical care. The lawsuit said temperatures in the prison sometimes surpassed 120 °F (49 °C). In response, St. Louis spent $40,000 on temporary portable air conditioning for the prison.

In 2021, St. Louis Mayor Tishaura Jones proposed closing the Workhouse on her first day in office. The Workhouse was later closed on June 17, less than a month into her term. In 2025, it was demolished.
