= St. Louis Fire Department =

American municipal fire department

Coordinates: 38°38′39.1596″N 90°12′46.5876″W

Operational area
- Country: United States
- State: Missouri
- City: St. Louis

Agency overview
- Established: September 14, 1857; (169 years ago)
- Annual calls: 110,000 (2022)
- Employees: 1141 (2022): 950 – Uniformed personnel; 191 – Civilian members
- Annual budget: $72,704,965 mil.USD [FY 2022]
- Staffing: Career
- Commissioner: Dennis Jenkerson
- Mayor of St. Louis responsible: Cara Spencer
- EMS level: ALS & BLS
- IAFF: 73
- Motto: "Justifiably Proud"

Facilities and equipment
- Battalions: 7
- Stations: 36
- Engines: 15
- Trucks: 20
- Squads: 2
- Ambulances: 12
- Tenders: 0
- HAZMAT: 3
- USAR: 1
- Fireboats: 2
- Rescue boats: 4

Website
- Official website
- IAFF website

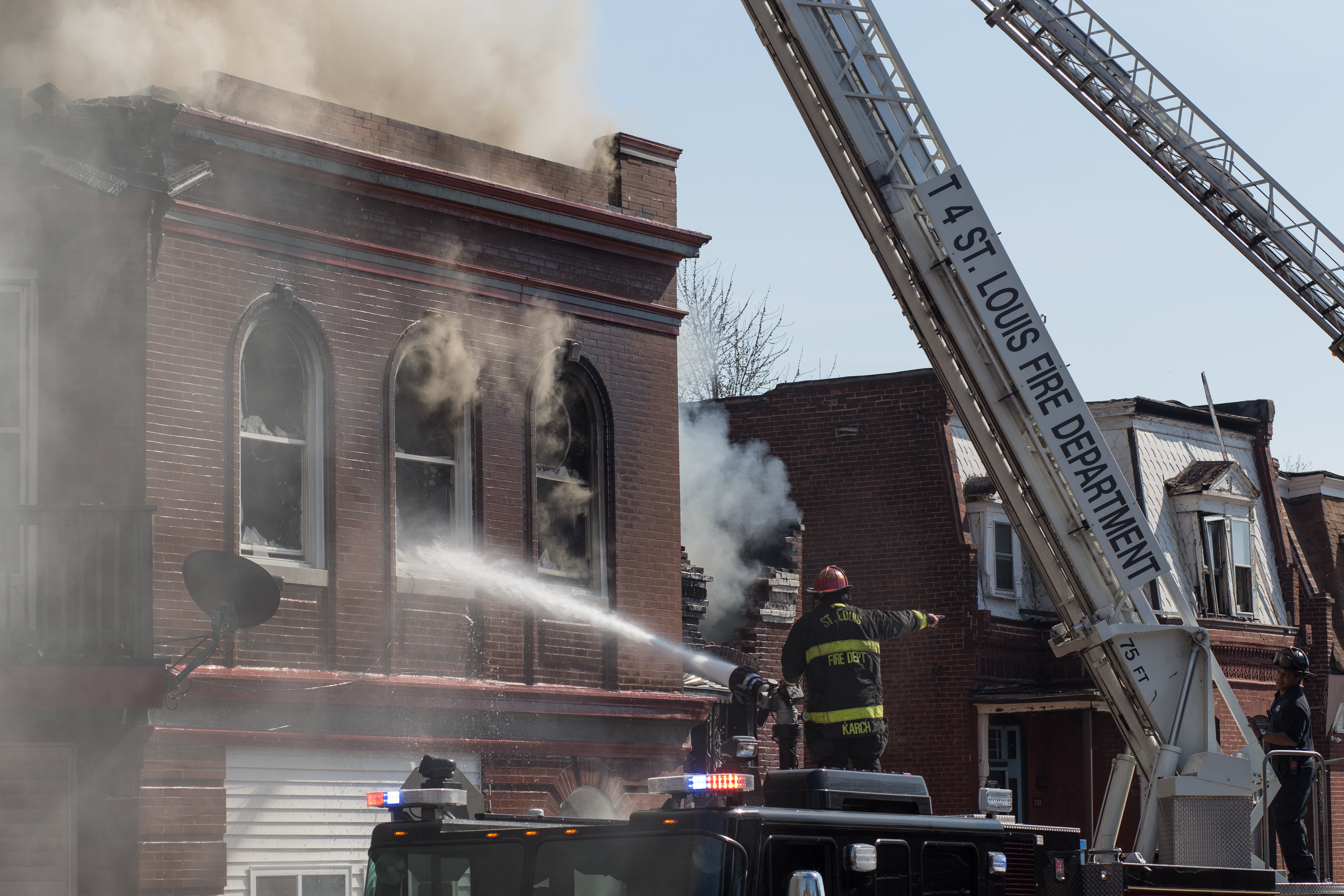
St. Louis Fire Department fighting a fire, March 2021

The St. Louis Fire Department (STLFD or STL City Fire) provides emergency medical services, fire cause determination, fire prevention, fire suppression, hazardous materials mitigation, and rescue services to the city of St. Louis, Missouri. The department is the second-oldest professional and fully paid fire department in the United States. The STLFD is responsible for 66.6 square miles (172 km^{2}) and has a population of approximately 294,890 with a daytime population of over 2 million.

The Fire Department Division is a division of the St. Louis Public Safety Department.

The St. Louis Fire Department is led by the Fire Chief & Commissioner, currently Dennis M. Jenkerson. The Fire Chief & Commissioner is appointed by the Director of Public Safety and each bureau is commanded by a Deputy Fire Chief, who oversees the department's bureaus. Administrative Services, Fire Prevention, Operations, Support Services, Emergency Medical Services are the major operational units in the St. Louis Fire Department.

== History ==
The first organized fire department in St. Louis was created in 1822, had several volunteer fire departments in the area. An ordinance was passed to purchase the equipment, which primarily consisted of leather buckets. When the alarm sounded, members of the department would fetch their bucket and rush to the scene. On September 14, 1857, the department transitioned to an all-paid department. The St. Louis Fire Department is the third oldest fully paid fire department, behind the Cincinnati Fire Department and the Providence Fire Department.

=== Specialized units ===
In addition to fire suppression and emergency medical services, the St. Louis Fire Department also has specialized units that include:

- Aircraft Rescue Firefighting at St. Louis Lambert International Airport
- Hazmat Task Force
- Marine Operations with a Boston Whaler called the "Jack Buck" which is permanently moored on the Mississippi River, along with five other small rapidly deployable boats including the "Stan Musial".
- Dive and Swift Water Rescue
- High-Angle Rope Rescue
- Trench and Collapse Rescue

== Office of the Fire Chief & Commissioner ==
The Fire Chief & Commissioner serves as the senior sworn member of the STLFD. Prior to 1857, the position was known as the Fire Chief The Fire Chief & Commissioner is the overall person in charge of the Fire department.

Commissioner Dennis Jenkerson is the 10th individual to hold the post as Fire Chief & Commissioner.

The SLFD'S's organization consists of seven bureaus. These include the following: Each bureau is commanded by a Deputy Chief or Deputy Fire Chief or Manager.

- Bureau of Emergency Medical Services
- Bureau of Prevention
- Bureau of Communications
- Bureau of Support Services
- Bureau of Fire Inspections
- Bureau of Fire Investigations
- Bureau of Fire Suppression

=== Administration ===
Command Staff	Title and Department
Derrick Phillips	"A" Shift Deputy Fire Chief
James Thompson	EMS Chief Paramedic – Bureau of EMS
Michael Darden	Fire Captain – Bureau of Prevention
Michael Richardson	Battalion Chief – Bureau of Communications
Ray Daniels	Fire Captain – Bureau of Fire Inspections
Calvin Stewart	Chief Fire Investigator – Bureau of Fire Investigation
Shawn Ryan	Battalion Chief – St. Louis Lambert International Airport (ARFF)

== Ranks of the STLFD ==
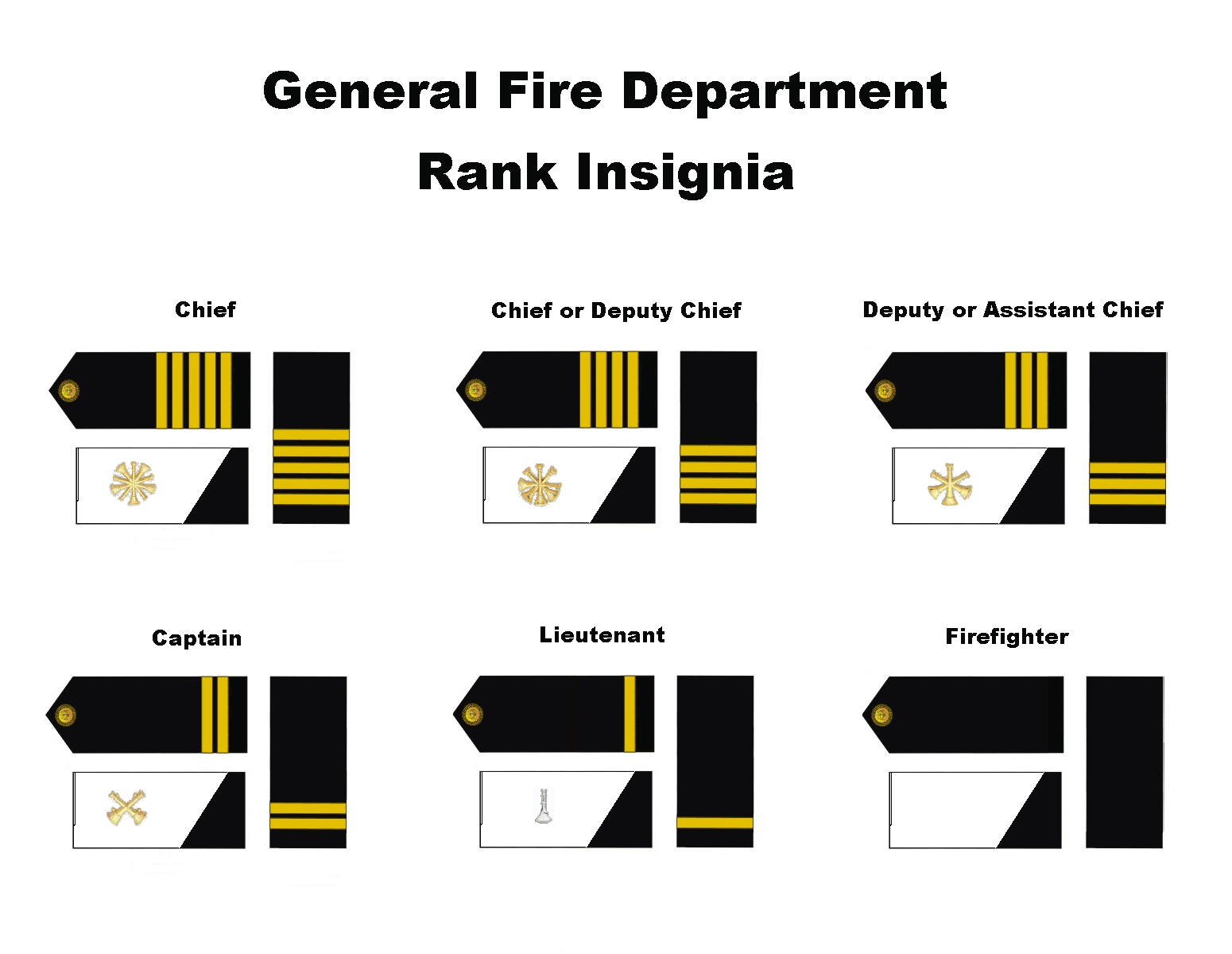
Typical rank insignia in the St. Louis Fire Department.

In the St. Louis Fire Department, helmet colors often denote a fire fighter's rank or position. In general, white helmets denote chief officers, while red helmets may denote company officers. The specific meaning of a helmet's color or style varies from region to region and department to department. The rank of an officer in the St. Louis Fire Department is most commonly denoted by a number of speaking trumpets, a reference to a megaphone-like device used in the early days of the fire service, although typically called "bugle" in today's parlance. Ranks proceed from one (lieutenant) to five (fire chief) bugles.

Title	Insignia	Badge color	Notes
Fire Commissioner (rank of Fire Chief)		Gold	The Fire Commissioner holds the rank of fire chief and is appointed by the Mayor of St. Louis. Highest rank in the St. Louis Fire Department.
Deputy Fire Commissioner (rank of Deputy Fire Chief)		Gold	The Deputy Fire Commissioner holds the rank of Deputy Fire Chief and is appointed by the fire commissioner. Second in command in the fire department.
Assistant Chief		Gold	The assistant chief is the commander of a bureau within the fire department.
Battalion Chief		Gold	The battalion chief is the commander of a battalion of fire stations and apparatus within his/her district.
Captain		Gold	A captain is in charge of a crew of firefighters in the fire station.
Lieutenant		Gold	A lieutenant is responsible for the administration and supervision of a fire company for fire suppression operations, hazardous material response, rescue operations, etc.
Engineer/Technician/Sergeant	No Insignia	Silver	Engineers/technicians/sergeants are responsible for firefighting vehicles, such as fire engines, that transport firefighters, carry equipment, and pump water at fire scenes.
Firefighter	No Insignia	Silver	A firefighter is a rescuer extensively trained in firefighting, primarily to extinguish hazardous fires that threaten life, property, and the environment as well as to rescue people and animals from dangerous situations.
Candidate firefighter	No Insignia	None	The primary responsibility of a probationary or rookie firefighter is to learn how to be a firefighter. They are both mentored and closely inspected by other senior firefighters and the officers.

- Note: In place of bugles, ladder companies are signified by axes, rescue companies by life guns, squad companies by crossed ladders and stacked tip nozzles, and marine companies by bugles with an anchor.

== Media ==
The firefighters, paramedics, and EMTs of STLFD are featured in A&E Network's reality series Live Rescue.

== Fallen Firefighters ==
From May 17, 1849, to Jan 13th, 2022, the Supporting Heroes Page reported that 171 Firefighters in the St. Louis Fire Department died in the line of duty.

== Marine Division ==
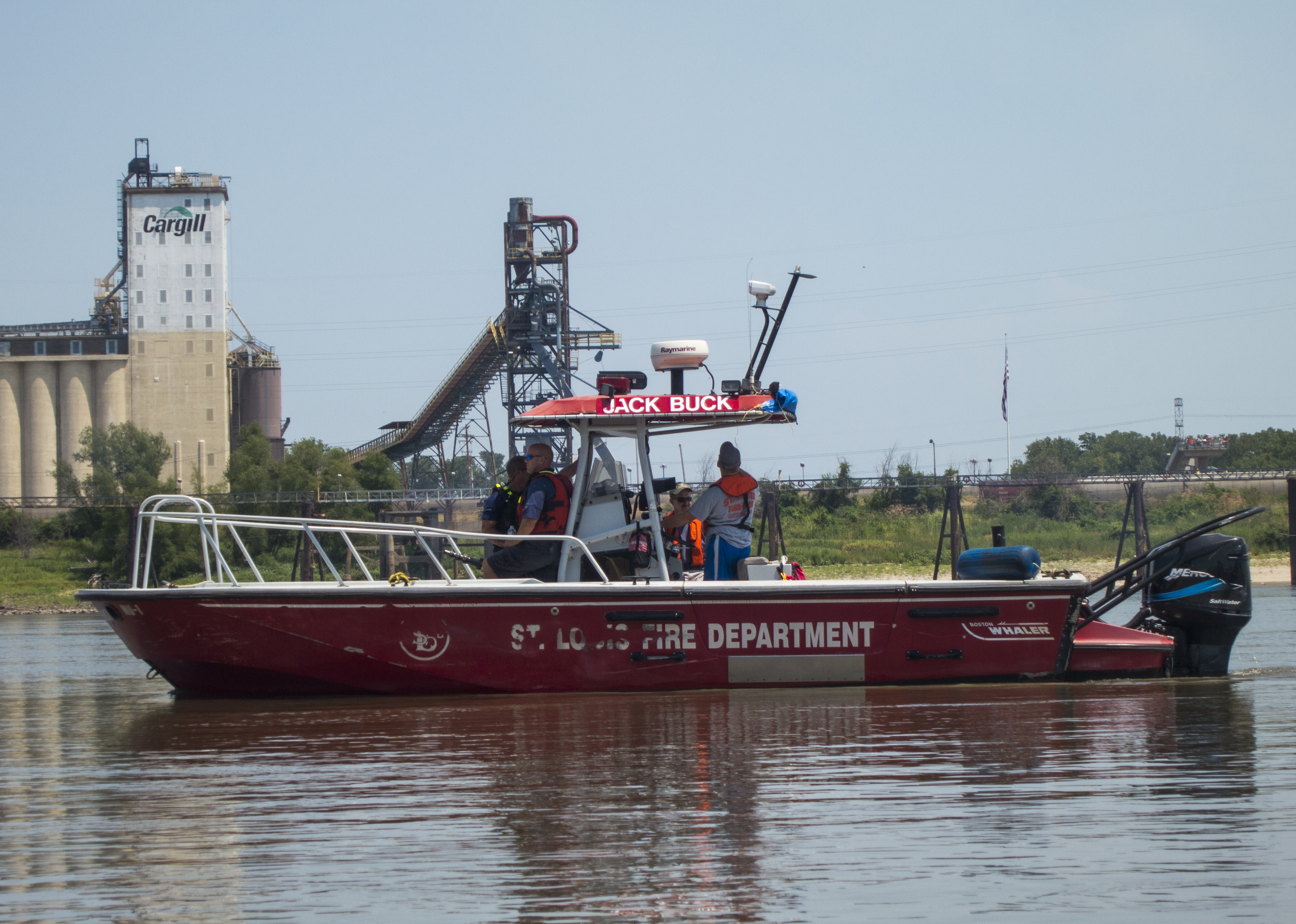
Jack Buck patrols the Mississippi during Fair Saint Louis

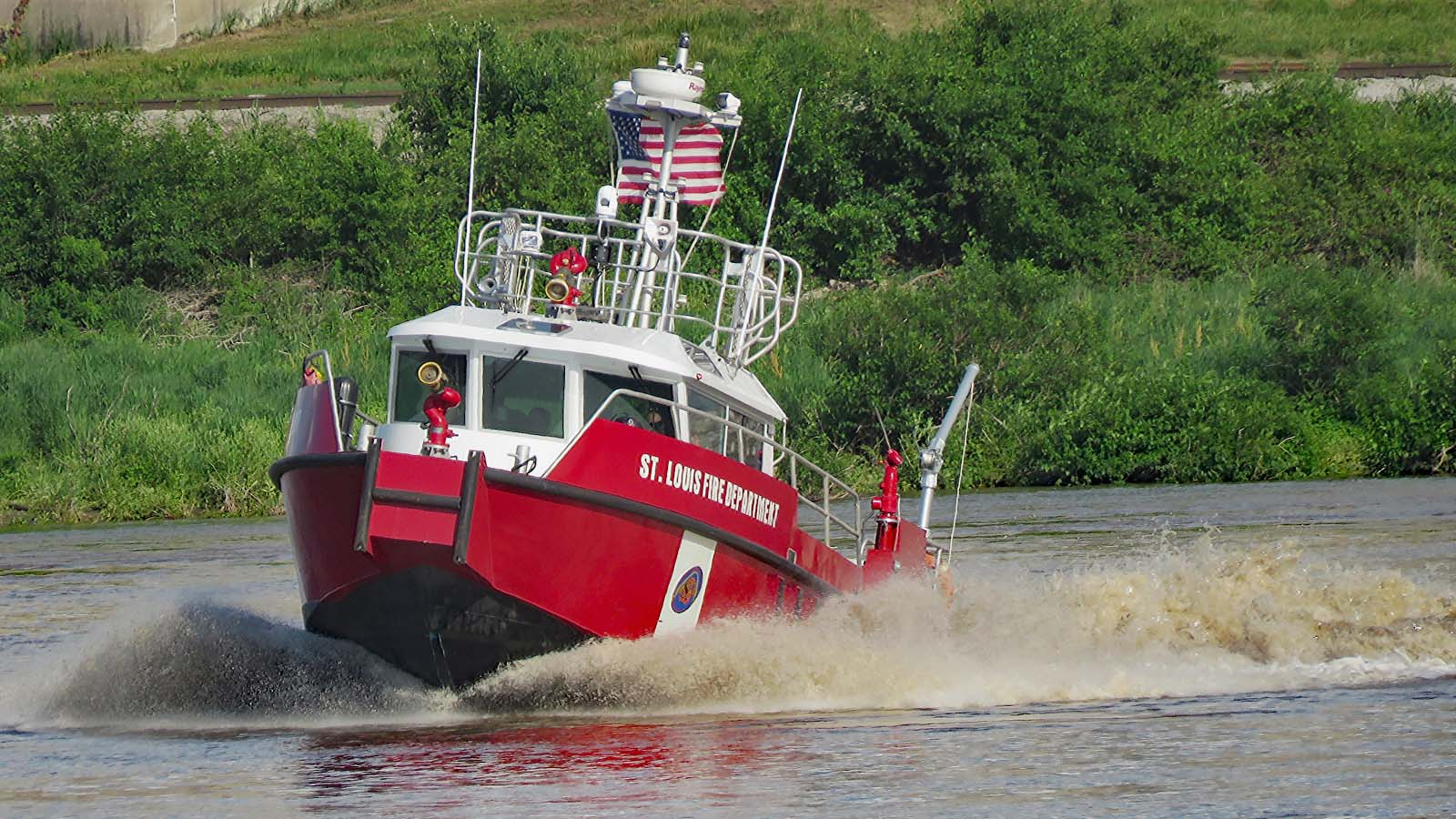
Stan Musial patrols the Mississippi during Fair Saint Louis

some fireboats of the STLFD
image	name	commissioned	retired	dimensions	pumping capacity	notes
	Jack Buck	2003		27 feet	4000 gpm	
	Stan Musial (fireboat)	2013		44-foot	7000 gpm	

As of 2013, there are four small fireboats operated in St. Louis. The largest two are named. The 27 feet (8.2 m) Jack Buck was commissioned in 2003 and the 44 feet (13 m) Stan Musial in 2013.

== Notable incidents ==
=== Great Fire of 1849 ===
On May 17, 1849, at 9:00 p.m., an enormous fire broke out in the heart of St. Louis. A steamboat named "The White Cloud" sitting on Cherry Street was on fire. The Fire Department, which, at that time, consisted of 9 hand engines and hose reels, responded to the scene. The moorings holding the boat broke, and the steamer floated downstream, setting 22 other steamers on fire as it went.

The flames leaped from building to building, sweeping everything on the levee for four blocks. The firemen were exhausted after fighting for over eight hours. The entire business portion of the city appeared lost. In a last-ditch effort to save the city, six buildings were spread with explosive powder and blown up. When the fire was finally contained after 11 hours, 430 buildings were destroyed, 23 steamboats along with over a dozen other boats were lost, and three people had died, including a fire captain.

== Stations and apparatus and Fire Boats ==
Below is a complete listing of all Fire Station and Apparatus Locations in the city of St. Louis by Battalion District, as of October 2019. In addition to the primary services (Fire Suppression, Emergency Medical Services, Fire Prevention, Fire Cause Determination, Hazardous Materials Mitigation, and Rescue Services) The St. Louis Fire Department also provides structural fire protection, emergency medical services, rescue response, and aircraft rescue firefighting at St. Louis Lambert International Airport from the two fire stations located there.

Fire Station Number	Address	Neighborhood	Engine Company or Rescue (Mini Pumper) Unit	Hook & Ladder Company, Truck Company or Crash Truck Units	Medic Unit	Special Unit	Chief Unit	Battalion
1	2910 S. Jefferson Avenue	Benton Park	Engine 1			Rescue Squad 1 Collapse Rescue unit Strike Force 2	Battalion Chief 802	2
2	314 S. Tucker Blvd	Downtown	Engine 2	Hook & Ladder 2	Medic 2	Chemical Unit 1 Air Truck; Support Unit 7		2
4	4425 S. Compton Avenue	Dutchtown		Truck 4			Battalion Chief 804	4
5	2123 North Market Street	St. Louis Place		Hook & Ladder 1 Truck 5	Medic 5		Battalion Chief 801	1
6	5747 Manchester Avenue	Cheltenham	Engine 6			Marine Unit 1		3
7	2600 LaSalle Street	Gate District		Truck 7		Fire Investigation Unit 821; Unified Command Unit 900	Deputy Chief 810	2
8	1501 Salisbury Street	Hyde Park	Engine 8					1
9	814 LaBeaume Avenue	Near North Riverfront	Engine 9		Medic 9			1
10	4161 Kennerly Avenue	The Ville		Truck 10	Medic 10			1
11	2224 S. 7th Street	Kosciusko		Truck 11		Marine Unit 2, Marine Unit 3, Marine Unit 4, Water Rescue Unit		2
12	5214 W. Florissant Avenue	Mark Twain		Hook and Ladder 6				6
13	1400 Shawmut Place	Hamilton Heights		Truck 13	Medic 13			5
14	3523 Magnolia Avenue	Tower Grove East	Engine 14		Medic 14			4
17	3238 Dr. Martin Luther King Blvd	Grand Center		Truck 17				1
19	6624 Morgan Ford Road	Boulevard Heights	Engine 19					4
20	5600 Prescott Avenue	North Riverfront		Truck 20		Battalion Chief 806		6
22	1229 McCausland Avenue	Hi-Pointe		Truck 22				3
23	6500 Michigan Avenue	Carondelet	Engine 23		Medic 23			4
24	5245 Natural Bridge Avenue	Mark Twain/I-70 Industrial	Engine 24					6
26	4520 Margaretta Avenue	Penrose	Engine 26		Medic 26			6
27	5435 Partridge Avenue	Walnut Park East		Truck 27				6
28	4810 Enright Avenue	Fountain Park	Engine 28	Hook & Ladder 5		HatMat 1, HazMat 2	Battalion Chief 805	5
29	200 S. Vandeventer Avenue	Midtown	Engine 29			Rescue Squad 2,		5
30	541 DeBaliviere Avenue	Skinker DeBaliviere		Truck 30				5
31	4408 Donovan Avenue	St. Louis Hills	Engine 31		Medic 31			3
32	3500 S. Grand	Tower Grove East	Engine 32		Medic 32			4
33	8300 N. Broadway	Baden	Engine 33		Medic 33			6
34	8227 S. Broadway	Patch		Truck 34				4
35	5450 Arsenal Street	Southwest Garden		Truck 35		Battalion 803		3
36	5000 S. Kingshighway Blvd	Princeton Heights		Hook & Ladder 3				3
North Fire Station	6171 Aviation Drive	St. Louis Lambert International Airport	Rescue 42 (Mini-Pumper)	Crash Truck 45		Haz-Mat. Unit 47, Battalion 808	Battalion Chief 808	8
West Fire Station	4578 Fee Fee Rd	St. Louis Lambert International Airport	Rescue 49 (Mini-Pumper)	Crash Truck 52 & 53, Hook & Ladder 40		Stairwell 53	Battalion Chief 808	8
