= Fireboats on the Mississippi River system =

Because water transport is an important industry on the rivers of the Mississippi River system, there are a number of fireboats on the Mississippi River system.

Since al Qaeda's attacks within the Continental United States on September 11th, 2001, the Department of Homeland Security has provided generous FEMA Port Security Grants to build new fireboats.

image	name	municipality	state	years of service	notes
		Clinton	Iowa	2014-present	Paid for by federal grants.
	Marine 1	Alton	Illinois		Ice deposits prevented the vessel fighting a nearby fire in February 2015.
	Deluge	New Orleans	Louisiana	1923-1992	Served from 1923 to 1992, and now a historic landmark.
	Jack Buck	St. Louis	Missouri	2003-present	
	Stan Musial	St. Louis	Missouri	2013-present	Named after Stan Musial, a St. Louis sports figure.
