= Bob Clark (businessman) =

American businessman

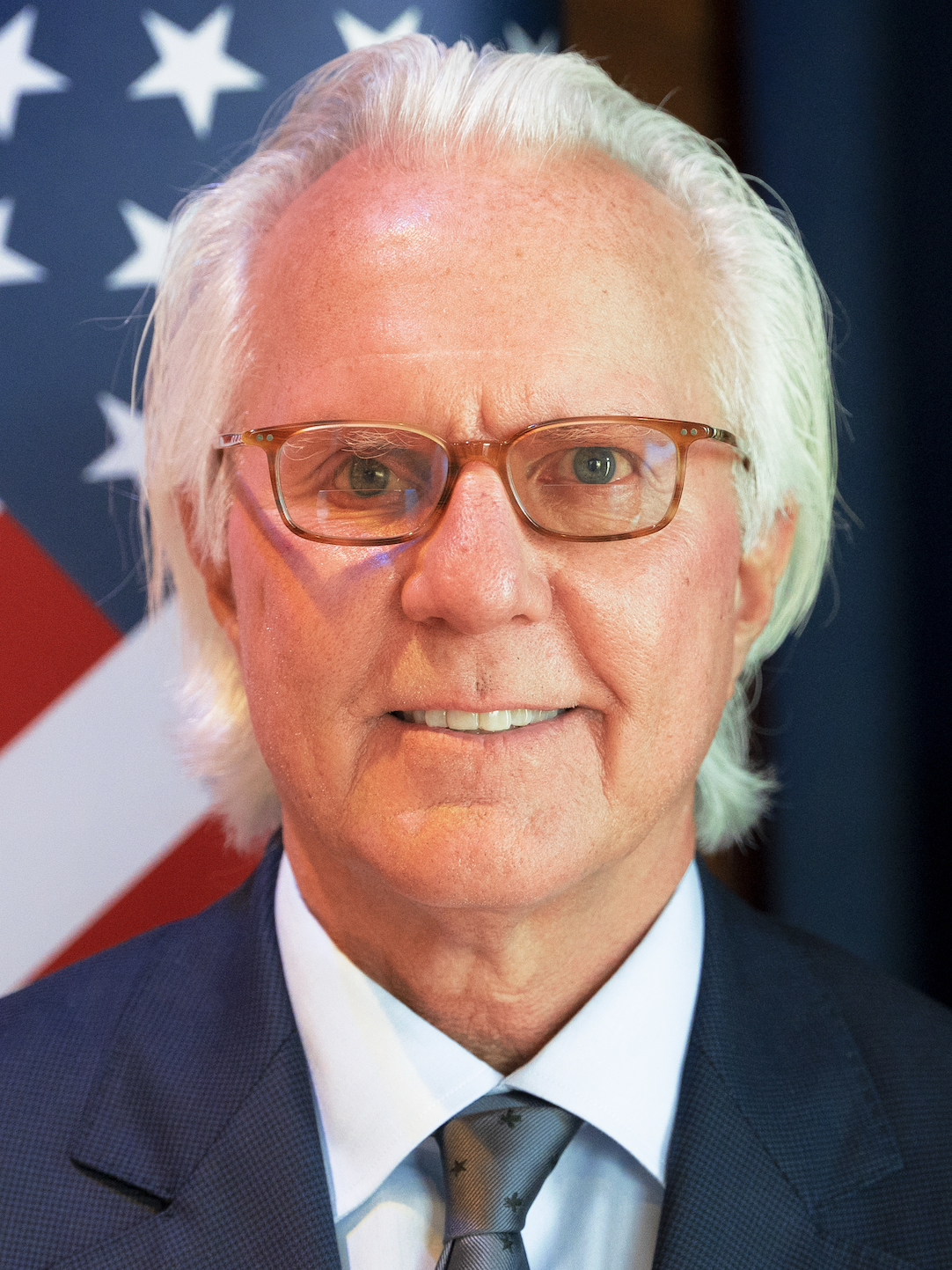
- Clark as U.S. Commissioner General 2021
- Born: Robert G. Clark
- Occupation: Businessman

Robert G. Clark is an American businessman and civic leader, best known as founder and executive chairman of Clayco, a real estate development and design-build firm. Established in 1984, Clayco is one of the largest privately-owned firms in its industry in the United States, generating over $5.8 billion in revenue in 2023.

== Early life and education ==
Clark grew up in Bridgeton, Missouri. He attended Parkway Central High School in Chesterfield, Missouri. His interest in construction began at age thirteen, when his father gave him a book on building. After high school, Clark started a painting business and became a partner in an equipment company before leaving Fontbonne University to found his own construction firm.

In 2023, he received an honorary degree from the University of Missouri System in recognition of his contributions to the construction industry.

== Career ==
In 1978, at age 19, Clark became a partner at Machine Maintenance and Equipment Company (MMECO). In 1984, he sold his stake and started a construction company, Clayco, in St. Louis, Missouri. In 2005, Clark partnered with Paul McKee to build the NorthPark business development near St. Louis Lambert International Airport. Clayco would later acquire Chris McKee's Optimus development company.

In 2013, Clark moved the company headquarters to Chicago. In 2023, the company announced office expansions in Berkeley, Missouri.

By 2024, Clayco had grown into one of the largest privately-owned firms in its industry in the United States, with over $5.8 billion in revenue in 2023 and more than 3,500 employees nationwide. As of 2024, The Clayco Enterprise includes a range of subsidiaries: Clayco, The Lamar Johnson Collaborative, Concrete Strategies, Ventana, Clayco Design and Engineering, and Clayco Systems and Equipment Innovations. In 2026, Clark described Clayco as one of the top data center builders in the country following public push back to proposed data centers in St. Charles and Festus, Missouri.

In 2026, Clark was featured on the cover of Forbes September 30 magazine with a story about Clayco's role in the Barack Obama Presidential Center and data centers, including the Quantum Shore facility.

== Civic contributions ==
In 2010, President Barack Obama appointed Clark to the Committee for the Preservation of the White House. In 2021, Clark was selected by President Joe Biden to be the United States Commissioner General at Expo 2020 Dubai. Clark, as the senior U.S. government representative at the event, led a team demonstrating U.S. culture, values, and technology.

Clark has maintained a residence in St. Louis County and investment in civic planning for the greater St. Louis region. He has worked with Mark S. Wrighton and Greater St. Louis, Inc to advocate for business interests in political leadership. In 2018, he participated in the exploration of privatizing the St. Louis Lambert International Airport. He was involved with a bid for an Amazon headquarters in St. Louis. In 2021, Clark pitched a plan for a major redesign of The Dome at America's Center. In 2024, he said that he would participate in a plan for businesses to establish work offices in downtown St. Louis. He was a notable player in the 2025 St. Louis mayoral election, giving a major financial support to Cara Spencer's campaign which a Clayco spokeswoman called "Bob Clark's $111K message to City Hall." Later that year, Clayco would take a heavy civic role in the response to the 2025 St. Louis tornado.

== Philanthropy ==
In 2016, Clark and Clayco's company partners promised to give $4.1 million to Washington University in St. Louis School of Medicine through the Clayco Foundation to advance research into RVCL, a rare blood-vessel disease that results in death five to 10 years after diagnosis.

The Clayco Foundation gave money to Savannah College of Art and Design, which renamed one of its building complexes for Clark. The complex, now called Clark Hall, is listed on the National Register of Historic Places as a National Historic Landmark.

In 2021, the Clayco Foundation endowed a $500,000 scholarship in Penn State’s Department of Architectural Engineering to help make the student body more diverse and help full-time undergraduate students who have financial need.

== Awards & honors ==
In 2007, Clark received the "What's Right with the Region" award from Focus St. Louis for improving racial equality and social justice. That same year, he was recognized by the NAACP with the "Commitment to St. Louis" award.

The St. Louis Business Journal named him among the "St. Louis Influentials" from 2005 to 2011.

In addition to the awards Clark has received personally, Clayco has also been widely recognized. The firm was named among Fast Company's Best Workplaces for Innovators in 2021, and that same year, it was honored as the ENR Midwest Contractor of the Year. Additionally, Clayco has been ranked one of ENR's "Best of the Best" list and was named first BDC Top 100 Design-Build Firms List.

== Personal life ==
Clark married his first wife, Ellen (née Lending), in 1984. She died in 2010 of RVCL, a rare genetic disease.
