= Stan Musial (disambiguation) =

Stan Musial (1920–2013) was an American baseball player.

Stan Musial may also refer to:

- Stan Musial (fireboat), a St Louis area fireboat named after Stan Musial
- Stan Musial Bridge, a bridge across the Monongahela River in Pennsylvania, completed in 1989, but renamed after Stan Musial in 2011
- Stan Musial Veterans Memorial Bridge, a bridge across the Missouri River, connecting St Louis, Missouri, and Illinois, completed in 2013
