= Discovery Partners Institute =

- Abbreviation: DPI
- Headquarters: 200 S. Wacker Drive
- Location: Chicago
- Executive Director and CEO: Gene E. Robinson (2026-)
- Parent organization: University of Illinois Urbana-Champaign
- Website: dpi.illinois.edu

The Discovery Partners Institute (DPI), is a research and innovation institute based in Chicago, Illinois led by the Grainger College of Engineering at the University of Illinois Urbana-Champaign. The institute connects the research capabilities of the University of Illinois Urbana-Champaign with businesses, government agencies, entrepreneurs and civic organizations to advance artificial intelligence research, technology development, workforce education and economic growth.

DPI focuses on interdisciplinary research in artificial intelligence (AI) and emerging computational technologies, including applications that combine AI with other fields, often described as "AI + X." Its work emphasizes responsible AI, including the development and deployment of AI in ways that address social, environmental and economic considerations.

The institute supports research collaboration and technology development through partnerships with industry and government. Its educational activities include graduate education, workforce development and experiential learning programs designed to prepare students and professionals for work involving AI and emerging technologies. DPI also works with community organizations to expand access to AI education and applications.

== History ==
=== Establishment ===
The Discovery Partners Institute was announced in October 2017 by Illinois Governor Bruce Rauner and the University of Illinois System as part of a broader initiative to expand research collaboration and economic development throughout Illinois. DPI was envisioned as the primary Chicago hub of the Illinois Innovation Network (IIN), which would connect public universities, private businesses and government organizations through a statewide network of research and innovation centers.

In June 2018, the Illinois Legislature approved $500 million for DPI and other IIN hubs within the state, and in August 2018 William Sanders was named as interim director of the DPI. That same month, Illinois Innovation Network hubs were established at the three campuses within the University of Illinois System (in Springfield, Champaign-Urbana and Chicago).

In September 2019, Bill Sanders announced his intention to become the dean of the College of Engineering at Carnegie Mellon University. The search for a successor led to the hiring of Bill Jackson, a former executive at Johnson Controls as the inaugural executive director. DPI flourished under Jackson achieving many successes including the establishment of Shield T3 which delivered groundbreaking SHIELD saliva testing for COVID-19 nationwide and globally. After leading DPI successfully for four years, Bill Jackson announced his departure effective February 16, 2024. University of Illinois System President Tim Killeen thanked Jackson for his dedicated leadership and appointed Deba Dutta as interim executive director of DPI.

=== Initial headquarters development ===
Plans for a permanent headquarters were initially centered on The 78, a proposed development site in Chicago's South Loop. The University of Illinois received the title to approximately one acre of land at the site in March 2022. The proposed headquarters was intended to provide space for research laboratories, educational programs, industry partnerships and innovation-related activities.

In October 2024, the University of Illinois paused the headquarters constructions project at The 78 as it reconsidered its real estate strategy and prioritized investment in the Illinois Quantum and Microelectronics Park and a downtown Chicago location. The revised approach envisioned maintaining a downtown presence while developing a separate quantum-focused facility.

=== Leadership and institutional transition ===
In January 2026, the University of Illinois Urbana-Champaign announced that The Grainger College of Engineering would assume leadership of DPI. Gene E. Robinson was named the institute's executive director and chief executive officer. Robinson previously served as director of the Carl R. Woese Institute of Genomic Biology at the University of Illinois Urbana-Champaign.

The leadership transition marked a new phase in the institute's development, with a focused emphasis on artificial intelligence, advanced computing and research collaboration across academic disciplines and industries.

=== Future Chicago headquarters ===
In February 2026, the University of Illinois System completed the purchase of an office building at 250 South Wacker Drive in downtown Chicago for $23.75 million. The approximately 245,000-square-foot property was acquired to serve as DPI's permanent headquarters.

== Education and Workforce development ==
DPI's education and workforce initiatives are intended to connect students and working professionals with technology-related education and career opportunities. The institute works with university academic programs, schools, community colleges, employers and other organizations to develop pathways into computing and technology careers.

=== Pritzker Tech Talent Labs ===
The "Pritzker Tech Talent Labs" (PTTL) is a workforce development initiative established by DPI in December 2020 with an initial grant from the Pritzker Foundation of $10 million over five years to DPI to support and develop promising and more diverse tech talent in Illinois. Today, PTTL operates a number of programs that serve middle and high school students, K-12 educators, community college and university students, and adults seeking to develop technology skills. It's activities include computing education, professional development for teachers, internships, project-based learning and employer engagement.

According to PTTL's five-year impact report published in December 2025, the initiative had reached more than 5,000 participants since its establishment. The report also documented participation by teachers, college students and adult learners, as well as involvement by employers and industry professionals.

=== Graduate education and academic programs ===
DPI collaborates with academic units at the University of Illinois Urbana-Champaign to connect students with graduate education, certifications and experiential learning opportunities in Chicago.

Programs associated with this work include the Master of Computer Science in Chicago, offered through the Siebel School of Computing and Data Science, and Grainger Engineering City Scholars, which connects undergraduate engineering students with Chicago-based professional and experiential learning opportunities.

DPI's broader educational activities also include short courses, workforce training opportunities and research based seminars and workshops, and opportunities for students and professionals to engage with industry partners.

== Research ==
The Discovery Partners Institute conducts and supports interdisciplinary research in artificial intelligence and emerging computational technologies. Its research model connects faculty and research capabilities at the University of Illinois Urbana-Champaign with industry, national laboratories, startups, government agencies and other organizations in Chicago. The institute's research activities are intended to connect advances in computing with applications addressing scientific, industrial and societal challenges.

In 2026, DPI established three cross-cutting research areas: artificial intelligence, future computing technologies and AI-enabled interdisciplinary applications, described as "AI + X." Responsible AI is a common consideration across these areas, encompassing human-centered design, system safety and robustness, transparency, explainability, fairness, governance and environmental sustainability.

=== Responsible artificial intelligence ===
Responsible AI is a central component of DPI's research strategy. Its approach addresses technical, ethical and societal considerations in the development and deployment of artificial intelligence systems. Research priorities include improving the reliability and safety of AI systems, making algorithmic decisions more transparent and interpretable, addressing bias and fairness, and examining governance frameworks for AI development and use.

The institute also examines the infrastructure and environmental requirements associated with artificial intelligence. These include the energy and water demands of data centers, computing infrastructure and broader environmental effects of increasingly intensive computational systems. In 2026, DPI introduced the Energy-Water-Compute Nexus seminar series to bring researchers and industry representatives together to examine the relationship between AI infrastructure, resource consumption and responsible technology development.

=== Future computing technologies ===
DPI's future computing research area encompasses quantum computing and emerging approaches to computational hardware, software and algorithms. The institute connects researchers with companies and research organizations working to develop and evaluate technologies that may extend existing computing capabilities.

DPI also participates in the broader quantum research ecosystem associated with the Illinois Quantum and Microelectronics Park in Chicago. The institute has served as an on-ramp location for organizations preparing to establish operations at the park, providing an opportunity for research and industry collaboration while the permanent facility is under development.

=== AI + X interdisciplinary research ===
DPI's AI + X research model combines artificial intelligence with expertise in other disciplines to address challenges across science, industry, and society. Research teams are designed to bring together faculty from multiple academic departments and connect their work with organizations and industry partners in Chicago.

Current AI + X research areas include:

- AI + Climate: Research involving artificial intelligence, climate science, and urban sustainability. Activities include climate risk assessment, environmental equity, climate resilience and the use of data and computational tools to support climate-related policy and planning.
- AI + Health: Research applying responsible AI and data analysis to public health challenges. DPI's work includes collaborations intended to help health agencies identify and assess emerging health and environmental risks and translate complex data into information that can support public health responses.

DPI's research portfolio also includes initiatives that predate its current AI-focused strategy. These have included research in public health, wastewater surveillance, computing and education policy. Such projects reflect the institute's earlier emphasis on connecting university research with practical applications and public-sector needs. Major undertakings include:

- Illinois Workforce and Education Research Collaborative (IWERC), which provides data-based analysis to Illinois policy and education leaders’ questions to help ensure more widespread and equitable education outcomes across the state. IWERC's initial funders are the Joyce Foundation, the Steans Family Foundation, the Pritzker Traubert Foundation, the Spencer Foundation, and two anonymous donors.
- Illinois Wastewater Surveillance System (IWSS) is a partnership between DPI and the Illinois Department of Public Health (IDPH). Launched in 2021, IWSS collects samples of raw sewage from over 85 wastewater treatment facilities across Illinois including metro Chicago and then analyzed in labs to track the presence of the SARS-CoV-2 virus which causes COVID-19. Separately, the principal partners in IWSS—DPI, University of Illinois-Chicago, Argonne National Laboratory and Northwestern University—test wastewater samples taken from sewer maintenance holes in Chicago neighborhoods and O'Hare International Airport to track COVID-19 for the Chicago Department of Public Health (CDPH). A pilot project launched in September 2022 monitors wastewater collected from schools across Illinois for COVID-19, as well as influenza A and B. In November 2022, IWSS was awarded a Chicago Innovation Award for its leadership in monitoring the ebb and flow of COVID-19 in Chicago and Illinois by detecting the virus’ presence in wastewater. In January 2023, DPI announced it has launched a website to provide data to the general public on COVID-19 levels at the community level, based on its continued disease-monitoring work for IDPH.
