= 2025 St. Louis mayoral election =

Local election in Missouri, US

- April 8, 2025
- Turnout: 25.76%
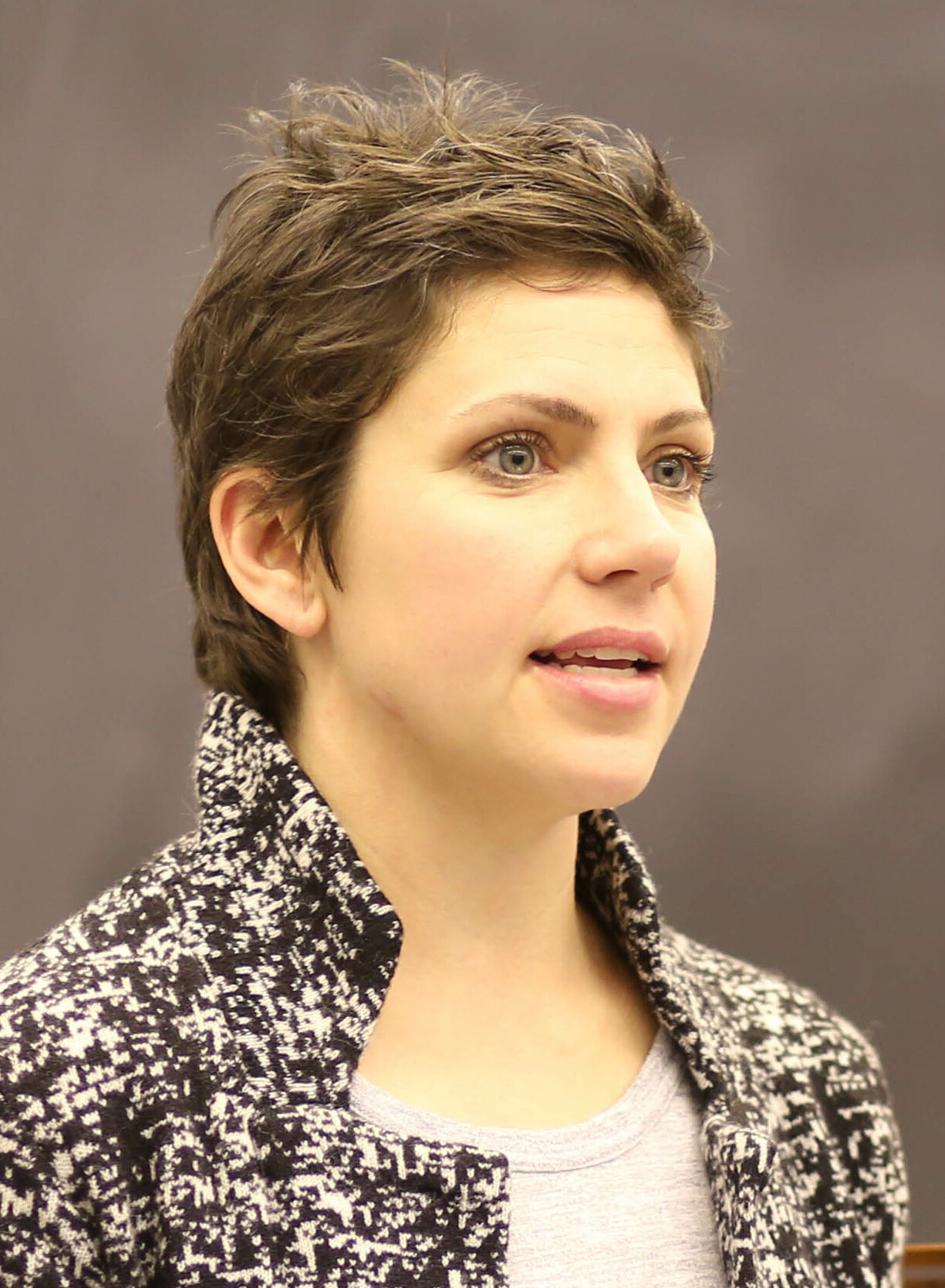

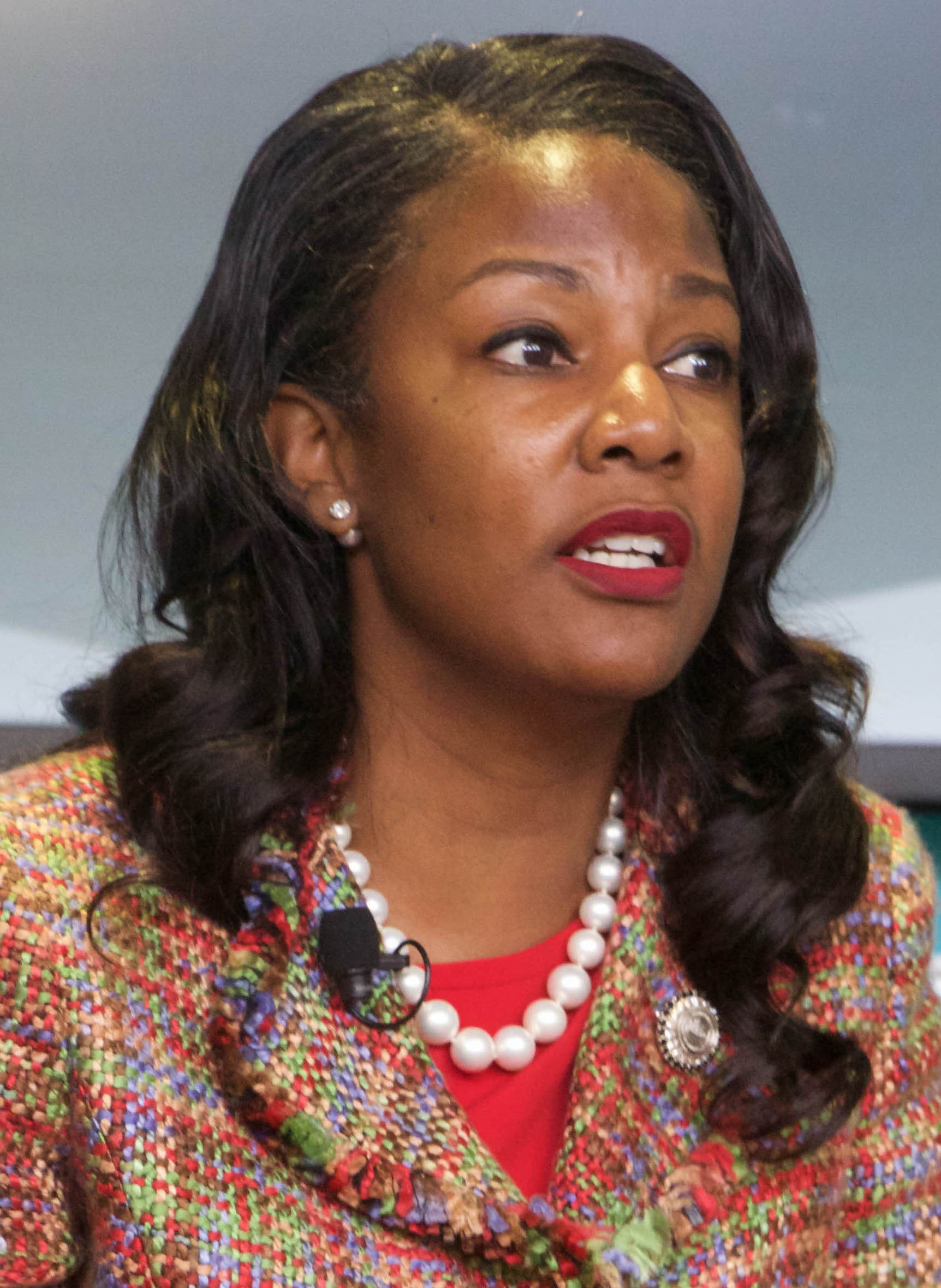
Candidate	Cara Spencer	Tishaura Jones
Popular vote	32,162	17,974
Percentage	64.15%	35.85%
- Spencer: 50–60% 60–70% 70–80% 80–90% >90% Jones: 50–60% 60–70% 70–80% 80–90% >90% No votes Tie
Mayor before election
Tishaura Jones
Democratic
Elected Mayor
Cara Spencer
Democratic

The 2025 St. Louis mayoral election was held on April 8, 2025, to elect the mayor of St. Louis, Missouri. The non-partisan election used approval voting, with the top-two candidates in the March 4 primary advancing to the April general election. In a rematch of the 2021 election, first-term incumbent mayor Tishaura Jones was defeated by alderwoman Cara Spencer by a wide margin.

== Candidates ==
=== Candidates who advanced to the general election ===
Candidate	Experience	Announced	Ref
Tishaura Jones	Incumbent mayor (2021–present); Treasurer of St. Louis (2013–2021); State representative for the 63rd district (2009–2013)	May 16, 2024 (Website)	
Cara Spencer	Alder for the 8th ward (Note: Represented the 20th ward prior to the 2023 redistricting) (2015–present); Candidate for mayor in 2021	May 23, 2024 (Website)	

=== Candidates eliminated in the primary ===
Candidate	Experience	Announced	Ref
Michael Butler	St. Louis Recorder of Deeds (2019–present); Chair of the Missouri Democratic Party (2020–2023); State representative for the 79th district (2013–2019)	August 2, 2024 (Website)	
Andrew Jones	Utility executive Perennial candidate	(Website)	

== Primary election ==
=== Endorsements ===
Tishaura Jones

Local officials

- Megan Green, president of the St. Louis Board of Aldermen (2022–present) from the 15th ward (2014–2022)

Organizations

- EMILY's List
- Everytown for Gun Safety
- Greater St. Louis Labor Council (co-endorsement with Spencer)
Cara Spencer

Individuals

- Robert Clark, real estate executive

Organizations

- Greater St. Louis Labor Council (co-endorsement with Jones)

Party chapters

- St. Louis Democratic Party

=== Polling ===
Poll source	Date(s) administered	Sample size	Margin of error	Michael Butler	Andrew Jones	Tishaura Jones	Cara Spencer	Undecided
Remington Research (R) (Note: Poll conducted for the local nonpartisan tipsheet Missouri Scout)	February 26–27, 2025	416 (LV)	± 4.9%	24%	13%	34%	51%	—

=== Results ===
Approval vote for each candidate by ward

Because the primary election was conducted using approval voting (and voters had the opportunity to mark their approval of more than one candidate), the percentages add up to more than 100 percent; they reflect what percentage of voters voted for that candidate.

2025 St. Louis mayoral primary
Candidate	Votes	%
Cara Spencer	23,826	68.11%
Tishaura Jones (incumbent)	11,612	33.19%
Michael Butler	8,701	24.87%
Andrew Jones	4,769	13.63%
Total votes	34,982	

== General election ==
=== Polling ===
Poll source	Date(s) administered	Sample size	Margin of error	Tishaura Jones	Cara Spencer	Undecided
Remington Research (R)	March 25–27, 2025	622 (LV)	± 4.0%	31%	55%	14%

=== Results ===
2025 St. Louis mayoral general election
Candidate	Votes	%
Cara Spencer	32,162	64.15%
Tishaura Jones (incumbent)	17,974	35.85%
Total votes	50,137 (Note: One vote went to write-in candidate Jerome Bauer)	100.00%

== Notes ==
Partisan clients
