= City Hall (St. Louis) =

Municipal building in Missouri, United States

Coordinates: 38.6268°N 90.1994°W

St. Louis City Hall
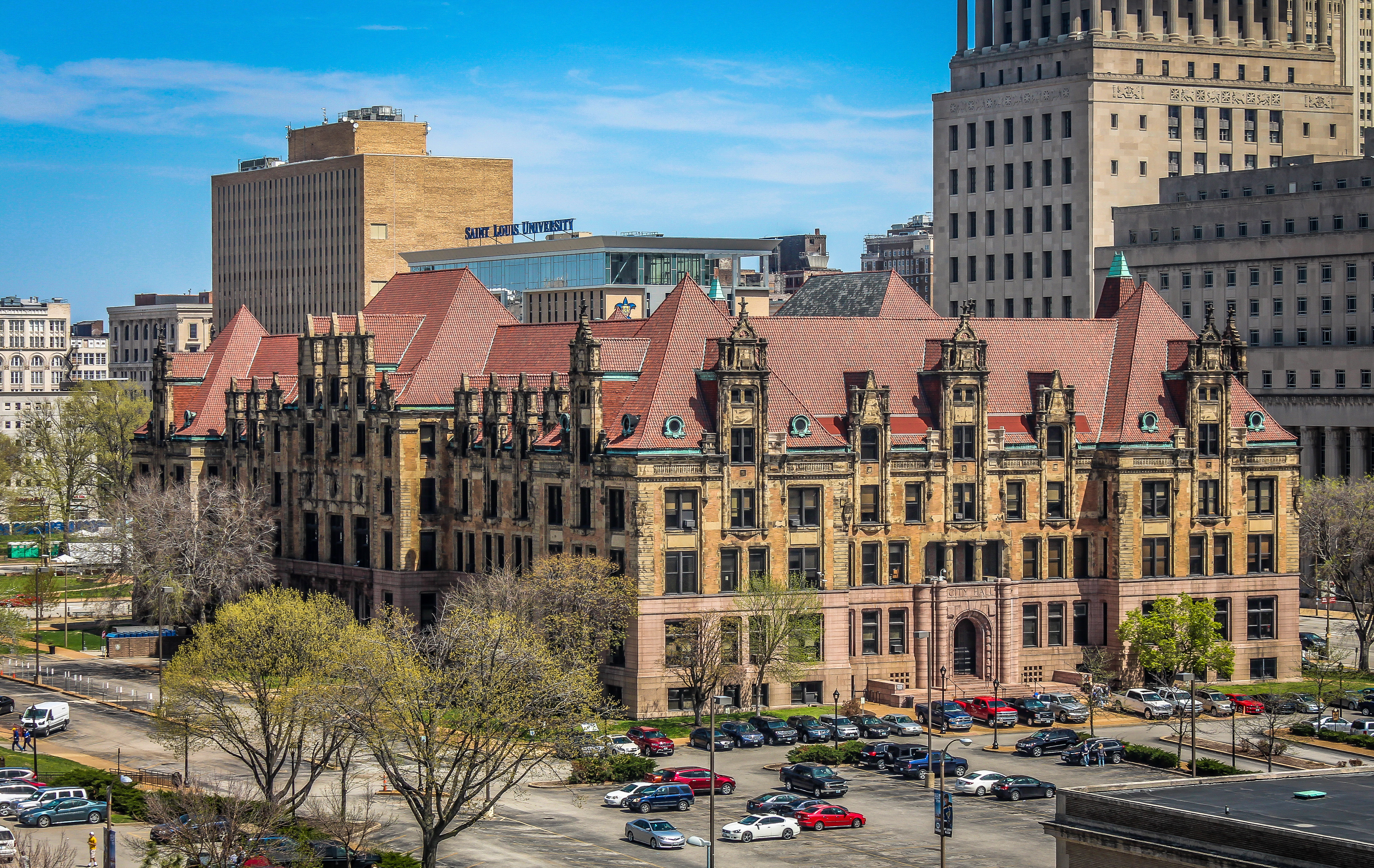
- The building in 2015
- Interactive map of the St. Louis City Hall area

General information
- Type: Government Offices
- Architectural style: Renaissance Revival architecture
- Location: 1200 Market Street; St. Louis, Missouri, U.S.
- Construction started: 1891
- Completed: 1898

Height
- Height: 80.0 m (262.5 ft)

Technical details
- Floor count: 10

Design and construction
- Architect: Eckel & Mann

Other information
- Public transit: Red Blue; MetroBus; MCT; At Civic Center

St. Louis Landmark
- Designated: 1971
- Reference no.: 29

St. Louis City Hall was designed by architects Eckel & Mann, the winners of a national competition. Construction began in 1891 and completed in 1898. Its profile and stylistic characteristics evoke the French Renaissance Hôtel de Ville, Paris, with an elaborate interior decorated with marble and gold trim.

Continuously occupied by the city since its opening, the building houses the offices of the Mayor of St. Louis, the Board of Aldermen and the St. Louis Department of Public Safety. The majority of government meetings occur there, most of which are open to the public. It was designated a St. Louis City Landmark in 1971.

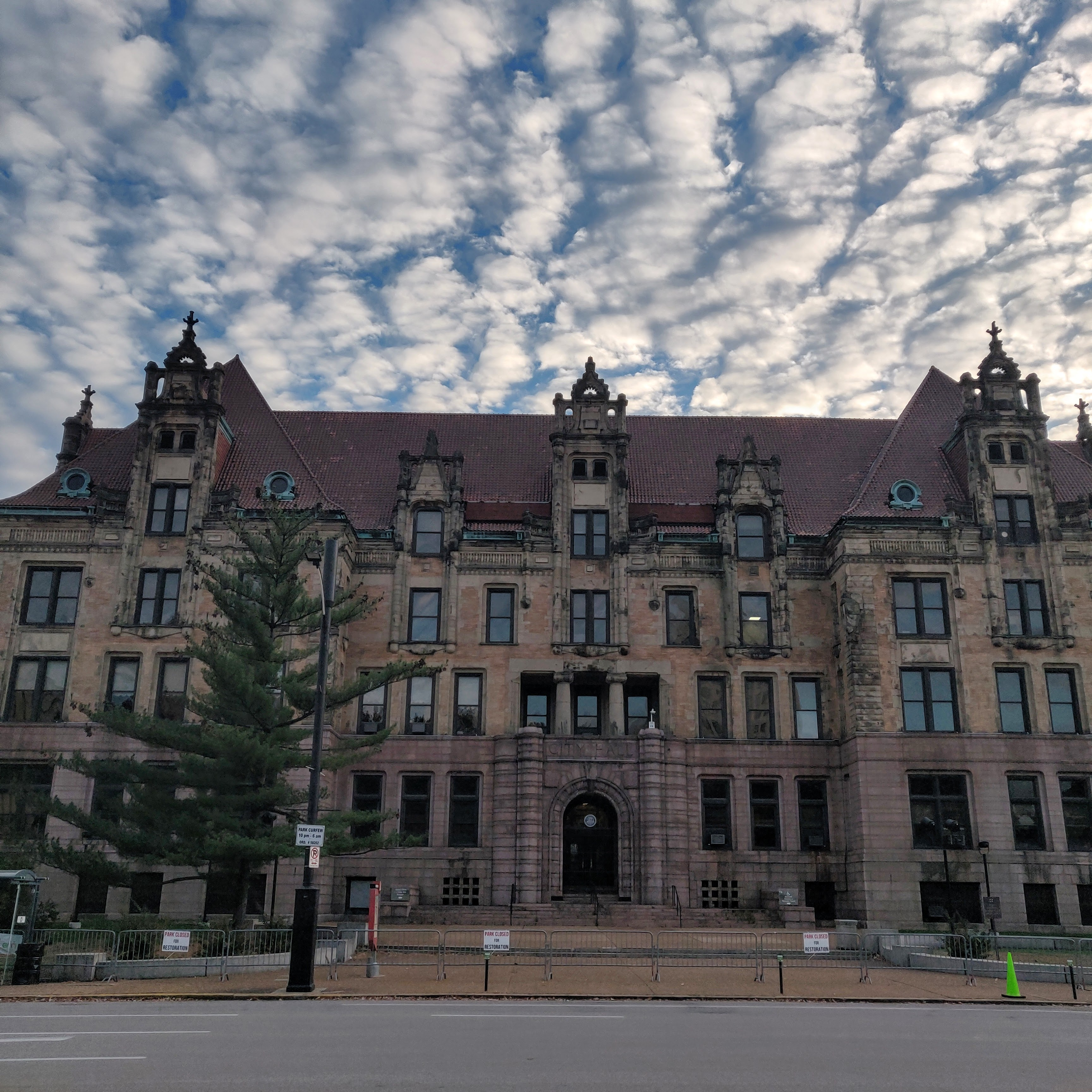
St. Louis City Hall view from Market Street

== City offices ==
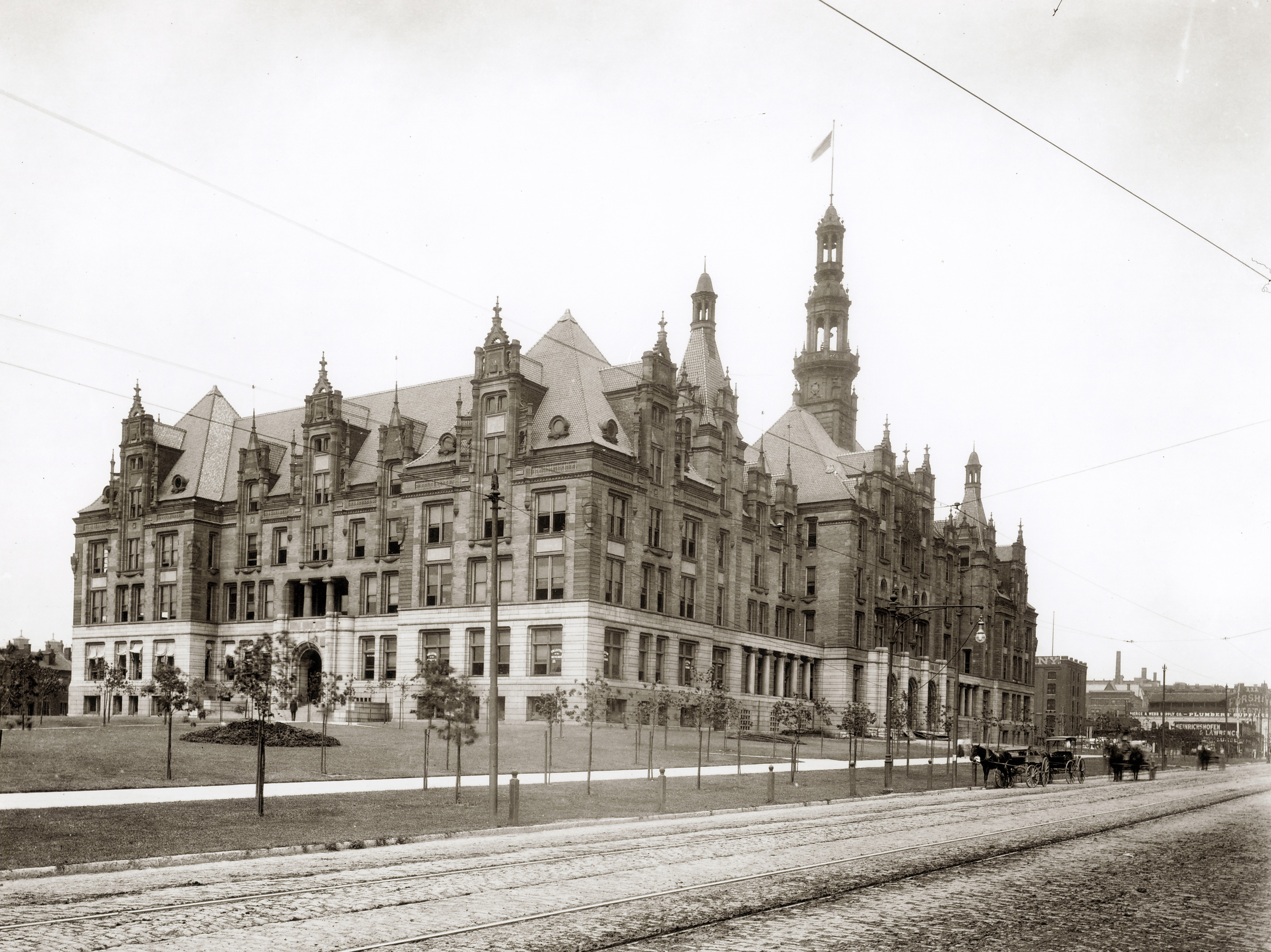
St. Louis City Hall c. 1900

City offices housed in the building include:

- St. Louis Department of Public Safety
- St. Louis Board of Aldermen
- St. Louis City Recorder of Deeds and Vital Records Registrar
- St Louis City Collector of Revenue
- Office of the Treasurer
- St Louis City Assessor
