= Gene E. Robinson =

American entomologist (born 1955)

- Born: January 9, 1955 (age 71)
- Education: Cornell University
- Awards: Fulbright scholar Member of the United States National Academy of Sciences; Wolf Prize in Agriculture (2018)
- Scientific career
- Workplaces: University of Illinois Urbana-Champaign

Gene Ezia Robinson (born January 9, 1955) is an American entomologist currently serving as the Executive Director and CEO of the Discovery Partners Institute and professor of entomology at the University of Illinois Urbana-Champaign. He previously served as the Director of the Carl R. Woese Institute for Genomic Biology (2011 to 2026) and is a National Academy of Sciences member.

Robinson is known for pioneering the application of genomics to the study of social behavior and led the effort to sequence the honey bee genome. On February 10, 2009, his research was famously featured in an episode of The Colbert Report whose eponymous host referred to the honey Dr. Robinson sent him as "pharmaceutical-grade hive jive".

== Life and education ==
After acquiring his bachelor's in biology from Cornell University, Robinson went on to earn his Ph.D. in entomology from Cornell in 1986. He joined the faculty of the University of Illinois Urbana-Champaign in 1989. He holds the Swanlund Endowed Chair in Etomology and a professorship at the university's Center for Advanced Study. He served as Director of the Carl R. Woese Institute for Genomic Biology from 2011 until January 2026, when he stepped down to become Executive Director and CEO of the Discovery Partners Institute, a University of Illinois responsible AI initiative based in Chicago, IL. He also holds affiliate appointments in the Neuroscience Program, the Department of Cell & Developmental Biology, the Program in Ecology, Evolution and Conservation Biology, and the Beckman Institute for Advanced Science and Technology.

== Work and discoveries ==
Authoring or co-authoring over 250 publications, Robinson has made a wide range of fundamental advances in understanding the endocrine, neural, and genetic regulation of behavior at the individual and colony levels in honey bees. His discoveries have significantly advanced the understanding of the role of genes, hormones, and neurochemicals in the mechanisms and evolution of social behavior.

Robinson's lab discovered the first gene known to be involved in regulating the bee colony's famous division of labor, and in 2002 published this in Science. The very next year, Robinson's lab was the first to show that social information causes mass changes in brain gene expression, also publishing this in Science.

Robinson's discovery on social regulation of brain gene expression has had a profound effect on understanding the roots of behavior. He developed a new paradigm to address the age-old “nature-nurture” problem, which was published in 2004 in an essay in Science and an op-ed in The New York Times.

In October 2006, a collection of biologists, led by Robinson, successfully published the sequence of the honey bee, Apis mellifera, together with the Baylor Human Genome Sequencing Center (HGSC). This discovery spurred an explosion of new bee research in molecular biology and genomics. Together with Harris Lewin and W. John Kress, Robinson helped organize the whole genome consortium the Earth BioGenome Project.

More recently, Robinson was part of a team that has discovered a plausible cause of colony collapse disorder, a malady that in 2007-2008 killed off more than one third of commercial honey bees in the U.S. By analyzing differences in gene expression between healthy and infected honey bees, researchers learned that bees in CCD hives have unusually high levels of fragmented ribosomal RNA, a symptom of infection with multiple viruses.

== Honors and awards ==
- University Scholar and member of the Center of Advanced Study at the University of Illinois
- Burroughs Wellcome Innovation Award in Functional Genomics
- G. William Arends Professor of Integrative Biology
- Certificate of Distinction from the International Congress of Entomology;
- Founders Memorial Award from the Entomological Society of America
- Fulbright Senior Research Fellowship
- Guggenheim Fellowship
- NIH Director's Pioneer Award (2009)
- Fellow, Animal Behavior Society
- Fellow, Entomological Society of America
- Fellow, American Academy of Arts and Sciences (2004)
- Member, U.S. National Academy of Sciences (2005)
- Member, National Academy of Medicine (2018).
- Received an honorary doctoral degree from Hebrew University in Jerusalem for "his scientific leadership and groundbreaking contribution to the molecular basis of social behavior" (2015).
- Received the Wolf Prize in Agriculture for leading the genomics revolution in the organismal and population biology of the honey bee (2018).
- Received Executive Officer Distinguished Leadership Award as part of the University of Illinois Urbana-Champaign's Campus Awards for Excellence in Faculty Leadership (2026)
