= Rachel D'Souza =

American politician

Member-elect of the Missouri House of Representatives from the 79th district
- Assuming office January 2027
- Succeeding: LaKeySha Frazier-Bosley

Personal details
- Party: Democratic

Rachel D'Souza is an American politician. A member of the Democratic Party, she is the member-elect for the 79th district of the Missouri House of Representatives.
