= Dennis Jenkerson =

Fire commissioner in Missouri

10th Fire Commissioner of the St. Louis Fire Department
- In office November 19, 2007 – Present
- Director of Public Safety: Shawn Dace
- Mayor: Cara Spencer
- Preceded by: Sherman George

Personal details
- Born: Dennis M. Jenkerson; September 24, 1957 (age 69) St. Louis, Missouri
- Spouse: Michelle J.
- Education: Saint Louis University

Dennis M. Jenkerson was appointed as the 10th Fire Commissioner of the St. Louis Fire Department on November 19, 2007, by Former Mayor Francis Slay. A third generation St. Louis firefighter, he has thirty-nine years of operational and tactical firefighting experience.

== Early life and education ==
Commissioner Jenkerson earned a Bachelor of Arts degree, Summa Cum Laude, in Organizational Leadership and Development from Saint Louis University, with minors in psychology and biology. He has completed coursework at Missouri Southern State College toward a Bachelor of Science degree in biology and chemistry and holds an Associates of Science degree in Fire Engineering from St. Louis Community College–Forest Park. Dedicated to sharing his knowledge and passion for the fire service, Commissioner Jenkerson is an adjunct instructor at the National Fire Academy in Emmitsburg, Maryland, Southwestern Illinois College, the University of Missouri and the State of Missouri Bureau of Emergency Medical Services.

== Career ==
Commissioner Jenkerson has served the St. Louis Fire Department in the capacity of a firefighter, fire captain and battalion chief, and is certified and experienced in each of the department's many domains including fire suppression, emergency medical services, aircraft rescue, vehicle entrapment, collapse rescue, high angle rescue, rescue diving and hazardous materials management; including chemical, biological, explosive and radiological incidents.

As administrator, Commissioner Jenkerson has served as an incident commander in the city's busiest fire district for the last decade and has established and managed essential department programs such as the Bio Watch Operations for the City of St. Louis, Fair St. Louis, the Mass Casualty Response System for Lambert Field, Y2K Compliance and the department's first in-house EMT certification program. Serving as Incident Commander, Commissioner Jenkerson has managed numerous major city events such as the Major League Baseball World Series in 2004 and 2006, the NCAA Final Four Basketball Tournament in 2005, the Missouri Democratic National Convention in Boston, Massachusetts in 2004 and several full-scale exercises under the Department of Homeland Security. He has also served as a Field Commander at St. Louis Lambert International Airport.

Jenkerson has served on several public-safety and research-related committees, including the Mayor's Strategic Planning Committee for Mass Casualty Incidents, continuing review for the Washington University School of Medicine Human Studies Board, the Washington University Institutional Biological and Chemical Safety Board, the St. Louis Fire Department Disciplinary Review Board, the department's Safety Committee, and special-operations committees under the St. Louis Area Regional Response System.

Commissioner Jenkerson also serves as a technical advisor for a number of federal, state and local agencies including the United States Marine Corps, the Department of Homeland Security, the Federal Emergency Management Agency, the National Fire Academy, United States Representative Russ Carnahan (Homeland Security/Terrorism Intervention), the University of Missouri, Department of Public Health, offices of the City of St. Louis, as a member of the St. Louis City Local Emergency Planning Committee and as an expert in hazardous materials and incident command for mutual aid partners in the St. Louis Metropolitan area.

In a collaborative research effort, Commissioner Jenkerson's work has been published as "Decontamination of Non-Ambulatory Victims in a Simulated Chemical Contamination Scenario;" American Industrial Hygiene Conference; Chicago, IL (May 2006); and

"Specialized Issues in Health Risk—Assessment of Decontamination Practices For A Simulated Contaminant Exposure In A Civilian Population;" American Industrial Hygiene Conference; Dallas, TX (May 2003)

Chief Jenkerson supports employee development through education and training, as well as the use of technology and innovation to improve the department's operations and safety procedures.

Commissioner Jenkerson serves on the following community boards as an advising member, The Salvation Army, American Red Cross, Mathews-Dickey Boys and Girls Club, St Louis Fire Department Lifesaving Foundation, Heat-Up and Cool Down St. Louis, and St.Louis BackStoppers.

Fire appointments
Preceded by Sherman George	Fire Commissioner; 2007–Present	Succeeded by Incumbent
