= Jack Buck (fireboat) =

Fireboat operated by the St. Louis Fire Department

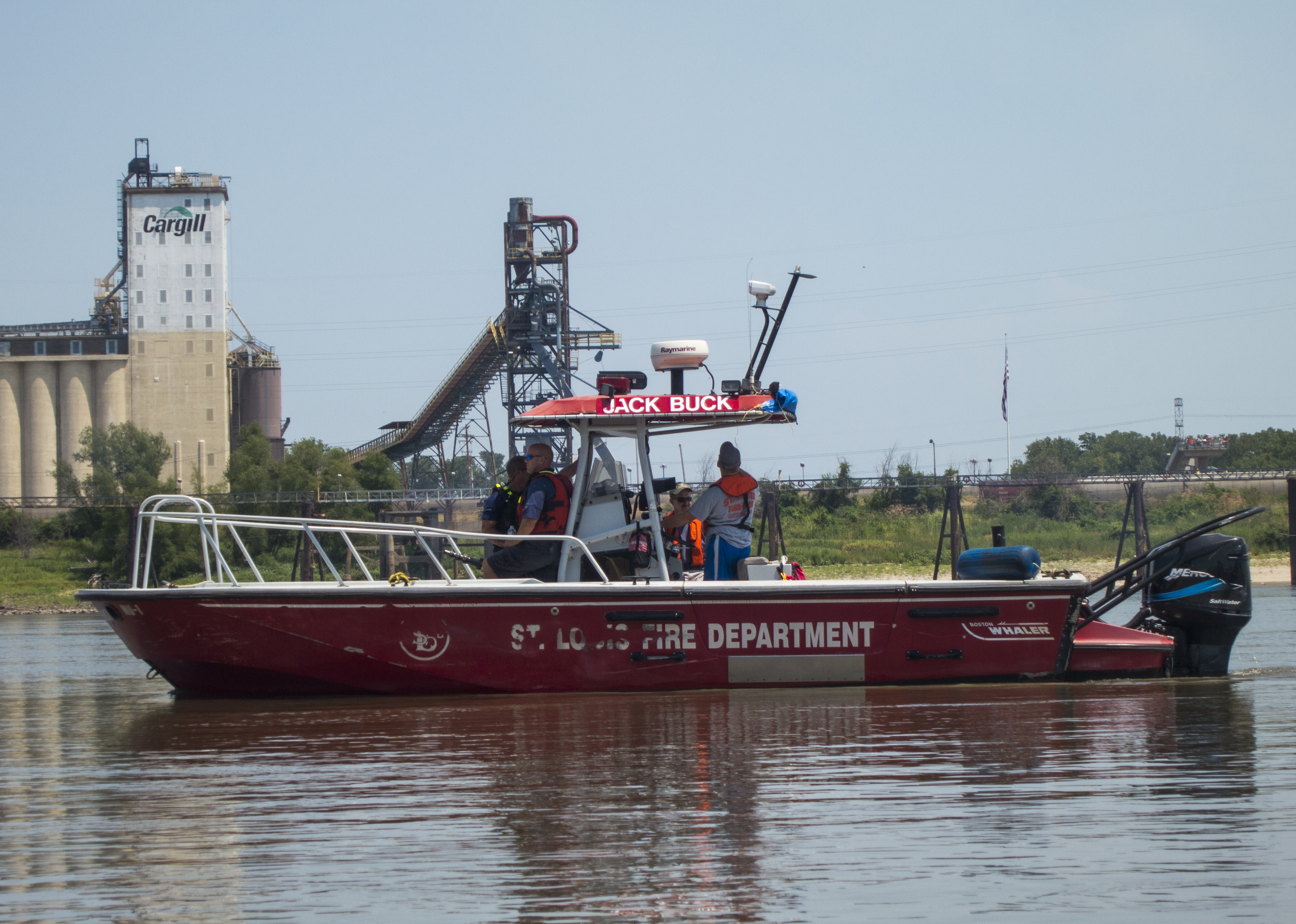
- The Jack Buck in 2012.

History

St. Louis Fire Department
- Name: Jack Buck
- Namesake: Jack Buck
- Owner: St. Louis Fire Department
- Operator: STLFD Marine Division
- Builder: MetalCraft Marine
- Launched: May 17, 2003
- In service: in active service
- Home port: Port of St. Louis
- Status: in Use

General characteristics
- Length: 27 feet (8.2 m)
- Speed: 30 knots (56 km/h; 35 mph)
- Crew: 6

The Jack Buck is a fireboat operated by the St. Louis Fire Department in St. Louis, Missouri.

She was commissioned On May 17, 2003. At that time she was the fire department's largest vessel, even though the city described her as a "Boston Whaler". She is 27 feet (8.2 m) long.

In 2010 the Jack Buck helped extinguish a fire that destroyed the excursion boat Robert E. Lee.
