= LaKeySha Frazier-Bosley =

American politician (born 1993)

Member of the Missouri House of Representatives from the 79th district
- Incumbent
- Assumed office January 9, 2019
- Preceded by: Michael Butler
- Succeeded by: Rachel D'Souza (elect)

Personal details
- Born: January 5, 1993 (age 33)
- Party: Democratic

LaKeySha Amr Frazier-Bosley (born January 5, 1993) is a Democratic member of the Missouri General Assembly representing the State's 79th House district.

== Career ==
Frazier-Bosley won the election on November 6, 2018, from the platform of Democratic Party. She secured ninety percent of the vote while her closest rival Libertarian Dan Elder secured ten percent. She was also elected secretary of the Missouri Legislative Black Caucus.

== Personal life ==
Her brother, Freeman Bosley Jr., was the first African-American Mayor of St. Louis.

== Electoral history ==
2018 Missouri's 79th House District election
Primary election
Party	Candidate	Votes	%
Democratic	LaKeySha Frazier-Bosley	3,436	50.1
Democratic	J.P. Johnson	2,087	30.5
Democratic	Maxine Johnson	885	12.9
Democratic	Reign Harris	445	6.5
General election
Democratic	LaKeySha Frazier-Bosley	11,937	89.7
Libertarian	Dan Elder	1,372	10.3

2020 Missouri's 79th House District election
Primary election
Party	Candidate	Votes	%
Democratic	LaKeySha Frazier-Bosley	7,653	100.0
General election
Democratic	LaKeySha Frazier-Bosley	14,321	100.0

Missouri House of Representatives Election, November 8, 2022, District 79
Party	Candidate	Votes	%	±%
Democratic	LaKeySha Frazier-Bosley	7,844	100.00	0.00
