= Battalion chief =

Rank of firefighter

A battalion chief is the rank and title of a subordinate fire chief or commanding officer in the firefighting command structure. The title of battalion chief is usually synonymous with firefighting in the United States and Canada.

A battalion chief is the lowest chief officer in a fire department's rank structure, above rank-and-file fire station officers and fire company officers. A battalion chief is in charge of a firefighting battalion, similar to a military battalion. A battalion consists of several fire stations and multiple fire companies. A battalion chief has command over each fire station's officers and each company or unit's officers, as well as the uniformed firefighters.

A battalion chief is usually under the command of a division chief, district chief, deputy chief, or assistant chief, etc who in turn reports to a chief of department, chief engineer, a shift commander, a tour commander or a fire commissioner or other personnel who are official employees. There are several fire departments, including North Hudson Regional Fire and Rescue, Atlanta Fire Rescue Department, Bruce Township Fire Department, Baltimore City Fire Department, San Francisco Fire Department, Jersey City Fire Department, Newark Fire Department, the Detroit Fire Department, the New York City Fire Department, the Chicago Fire Department, the Sacramento Fire Department, CAL FIRE, Philadelphia Fire Department, the Los Angeles County Fire Department and the St. Louis Fire Department who all have battalion chiefs in their rank structure. There are several fire departments, including The Boston Fire Department, Denver Fire Department, New Orleans Fire Department and the Toronto Fire Services, however, that use the title of district chief in place of battalion chief.
