= Paul McKee (developer) =

American property developer

Paul McKee, Jr. is a St. Louis, Missouri-area property developer. McKee's property management and development company, M Property Services, formerly McEagle Properties, is based in O'Fallon, Missouri.

McKee's co-founded the construction firm Paric Corp. in 1979. He is a founding member of the board and former chairman of BJC HealthCare, the area's largest employer.

McKee was the primary organizer of a bipartisan trade mission to People's Republic of China to stimulate trade between that country and businesses in the region, with a particular focus on using the Lambert-St. Louis International Airport as a cargo stopover from China to South America.

== Major developments ==
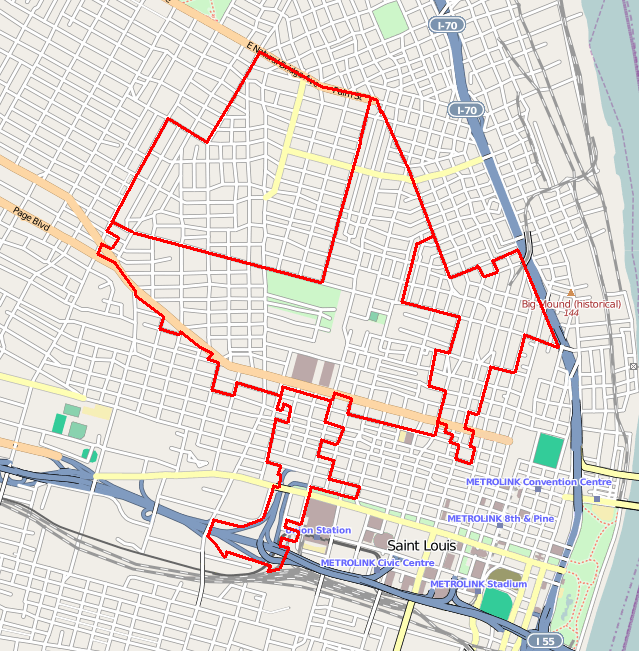
NorthSide covers several wards and is broken into four development sections.

=== St. Louis County ===
Some of McKee's major developments include WingHaven, a 1,200-acre (4.9 km^{2}) mixed-use project that is the corporate home to Mastercard Operations Center in O'Fallon, NorthPark, a joint venture with Bob Clark's Clayco Realty Group including 5,000,000 square feet (460,000 m^{2}) of planned commercial and industrial redevelopment in North St. Louis County that is the corporate home to Express Scripts, and Hazelwood Commerce Center, a 151-acre (0.61 km^{2}) industrial park in Hazelwood, Missouri.

=== North City ===
McKee's planned NorthSide Regeneration Project in the Old North Saint Louis, JeffVanDerLou and Saint Louis Place neighborhoods was initially referred to as Blairmont, in reference to one of the shell companies used to acquire lots and buildings in the three neighborhoods. McKee had initially denied involvement in the mass acquisition of properties until researcher Michael Allen traced ownership to McKee's disclosures in 2006.

In May 2009 the redevelopment idea was publicly revealed as "Northside," a $8.1 billion proposal covering some 1,500 acres (6.1 km^{2}) of the city. It would include four commercial centers totaling over 3,000,000 square feet (280,000 m^{2}) of new retail and office space, 1,000,000 square feet of light industrial space, new homes, parks, and a trolley line. According to The St. Louis American, the plan countered the work of resident rehabbers, who self-financed restorations of historic homes.

In 2018, NorthSide was subject to an FBI investigation for "paper only" transactions in which McKee was reimbursed in state tax credits for no money down real estate transactions. McKee had also obtained approximately $9 million in tax credits from a no money down deal with business partners Larry Chapman and Bob Clark in 2011 and 2012.

NorthSide was intended to revitalize North St. Louis. However, according to St. Louis Public Radio, "Nearly a decade after Paul McKee sold St. Louis on a vision worth billions to rehab more than 150 properties on the city’s north side, roofs have caved, walls have crumbled and residents have lost patience — and hope." In addition, the state of Missouri sued NorthSide Regeneration for tax credit fraud, alleging that NorthSide kept $4.5 million in tax credits for redevelopment projects despite not completing many of the purchases. The suit was settled in 2019.

McKee asked the City of St. Louis for $409,917,496 in tax increment financing to get the project off the ground. The project still remains un-started, and McKee holds the majority of property in the JeffVanderLou area, most of which are on the vacated list. In 2024, the St. Louis Board of Aldermen described McKee as a 'bad actor' as they unanimously passed an eminent domain measure to seize vacant properties from negligent owners in North City.

In September 2024, McKee agreed to repay a 2020 loan owed to the Carpenter's union that established a short-lived grocery store north of downtown. After missing the deadline, McKee plead the 5th when asked about available assets, as well as details related to the closed grocery store operations and former employees.

McKee has been criticized for "demolition by neglect." A number of buildings on the northside would be protected under historic preservation measures, including a mansion previously owned by Mark Twain's relative, but have deteriorated beyond repair or burned down after demolition requests were denied.

==== Homer G. Philips ====
McKee sought to open a three-bed urgent care near the new NGA property, appropriating the name "Homer G. Phillips" for the hospital. Homer G. Phillips Hospital was an active hospital in The Ville until it was closed down. Long-time activists who worked and advocated for the hospital to remain open filed a federal lawsuit against McKee's use of the name. McKee's new hospital is in an area outside The Ville and is not close to the size of the previous hospital.

In December 2024, the hospital announced temporary closure due to low blood supply and financial issues.

==== National Geospatial-Intelligence Agency ====
The National Geospatial-Intelligence Agency (NGA) West Headquarters has committed to building a $1.7 billion campus on a 100-acre site within the city. The NGA campus opened on September 26, 2025 and is located at Cass Ave and Jefferson Ave north of downtown St. Louis.

== Personal life ==
McKee grew up in the suburb of Overland, Missouri and attended Chaminade College Preparatory School. He has a civil engineering degree from Washington University in St. Louis and is a registered professional engineer in Missouri, Indiana, Iowa and Illinois. He is married to Marguerite "Midge" McKee and the two have four children and 15 grandchildren. They live in the suburb of Chesterfield, Missouri. https://www.facebook.com/share/v/1BB4LQVbsk/
