= St. Louis Public Safety Department =

Coordinates: 38°37′37.2108″N 90°11′57.8472″W

Public Safety Department - City of St. Louis
- Common name: St. Louis Public Safety Department
- Abbreviation: DPS
- Motto: Service, Safety, Protection

Agency overview
- Formed: 1935
- Employees: 31550
- Annual budget: $383,257,230 (2023)

Jurisdictional structure
- Operations jurisdiction: St. Louis, Missouri, U.S.
- Map of Public Safety Department - City of St. Louis's jurisdiction
- Area: 65.99 square miles (170.91 km^{2})
- Population: 292,047 (2022)
- Legal jurisdiction: Citywide
- Governing body: Board of Aldermen's Committee on Public Safety

Operational structure
- Headquarters: 1200 Market St #401; St. Louis, Missouri
- Fire, Police, Building, Corrections Officers: 2,269
- Civilian employees (Police & Fire service)s: 652
- Elected officer responsible: Cara Spencer, Mayor of St. Louis
- Agency executive: Shawn Dace, Director

Website
- St. Louis City DPS website

The Public Safety Department - City of St. Louis is the department charged with police, fire and rescue operations in City of St. Louis. It is one of the largest public safety departments in the nation, with over 2,269 sworn officers. Each officer serves as a Police Officer, Firefighter, and Medical First Responder.

The current Director of Public Safety is Shawn Dace.

The Department of Public Safety is subject to the legislative oversight and direction of the Board of Aldermen's Public Safety Committee. The Public Safety Committee considers all matters pertaining to the Department of Public Safety, the Police Department, The Corrections Division, Excise and Liquor Control Division, Neighborhood Stabilization Team, the Fire Department, the Division of Building and Inspections and the City Emergency Management Agency.

== Organization ==
The Director of the St. Louis Public Safety Department is appointed by the Mayor of St. Louis. The director is assisted in managing the Department by the Deputy Director of Public Safety and several division heads.

- Director
  - Deputy Director
    - Commissioner of Building & Code Division
    - Commissioner of Emergency Management Agency
    - Commissioner of Corrections Division
    - Commissioner of Excise & Liquor Control Division
    - Executive Director of Neighborhood Stabilization Division
    - Commissioner of St. Louis Police Department
    - Commissioner of St. Louis Fire Department – which includes the Bureau of Emergency Medical Services

== Command staff ==
Bureau	Title	Name
Department of Public Safety	Director of Public Safety	Shawn Dace
Department of Public Safety	Deputy Director	Levaughn Smart
Civilian Police Oversight Board	Commissioner	Kimberley Taylor-Riley
Building & Code Division	Commissioner	Ed Ware
City Emergency Management Agency	Commissioner	Greggory J. Favre
Corrections Division	Commissioner of Corrections	Nate Hayward
Excise & Liquor Control Division	Commissioner	Myles McDonnell
Neighborhood Stabilization Unit	Executive Director	Karen Clifford - Acting
Metropolitan Police Department	Police Commissioner	Robert J. Tracy
St. Louis Fire Department	Fire Commissioner	Dennis Jenkerson

== Mission statement ==
The published mission statement of the Department of Public Safety is:

The mission of the St. Louis Department of Public Safety is to use its resources to safeguard the people who live, work, do business and visit the city. The staff of the various divisions are hardworking and committed to improving their level of performance as well as developing policy and procedures that are transparent, understandable and streamlined. Together, we strive to be the premier municipal public safety department.
