= Fair Saint Louis =

Annual festival in St. Louis, Missouri

Coordinates: 38.62428°N 90.18368°W

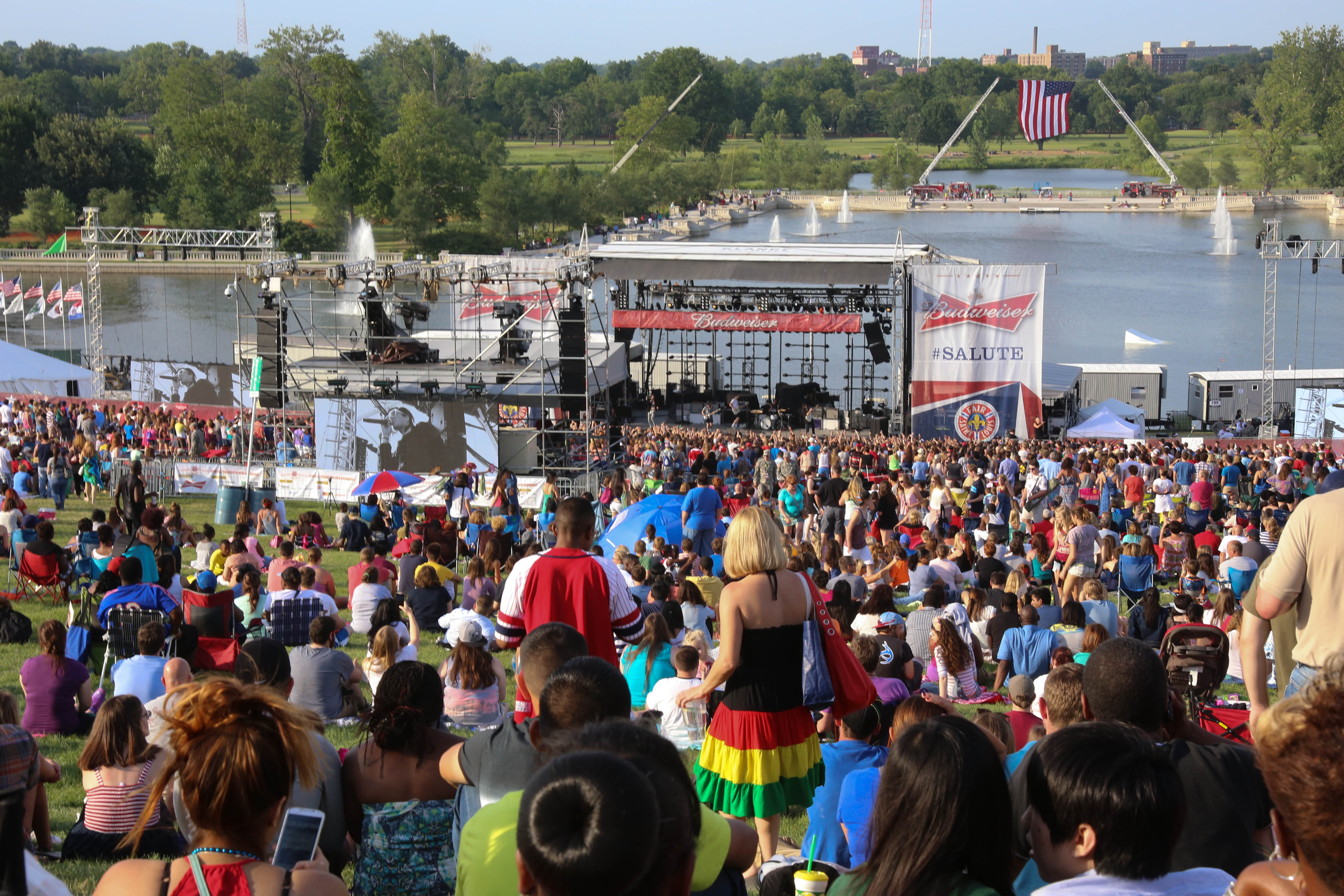
Fair St. Louis in 2014

Fair St. Louis is an annual festival held during the United States Independence Day holiday in downtown St. Louis, Missouri, at the Gateway Arch National Park. It is an independent 501c3 non profit organization.

== History ==
The event originally named "V.P. Fair" was a successor to the Veiled Prophet Parade, which began as a St. Louis civic celebration in 1878. The first V.P. Fair took place in 1981.

In September 1994, the name would be changed to Fair St Louis for subsequent years. "The name 'Fair St. Louis' is expected to be marketable to all parts of the country," said Craig Kaminer, a spokesman for the VP Fair Foundation in 1994. "The vision is to create for St. Louis what the Mardi Gras is for New Orleans."

"In addition," he said, "having the new name will send a positive message to those who have not supported the fair in the past . . . who have felt that the fair was not designed with them in mind." Kaminer said that the initials VP, for Veiled Prophet, "evoked images of the Veiled Prophet Ball and other related events that center around those of wealth and prominence.

David Harper, a member of the fair's minority relations committee, said that "The idea of Veiled Prophet is offensive to some people," noting that the VP association excluded blacks from membership until 1979.

The fair's first theme, in 2002, was "Many Colors, One Flag, One People."

== 4th of July parade ==
Although this fair is held annually, it did not take place in person in July 2020. This was due to the ongoing Covid-19 pandemic. Instead they shifted it to be held virtually for the year. It did return in person in 2021.

== Attendees and activities ==
The fair expects to see around 800,000–1,000,000 guests attending the fair. The fair offers food, drinks, live music, rides for kids, fireworks on some occasions, contest, and a picnic area with tables for their visitors.

== See also ==
- Veiled Prophet Parade and Ball (complete history)
