= Stan Musial (fireboat) =

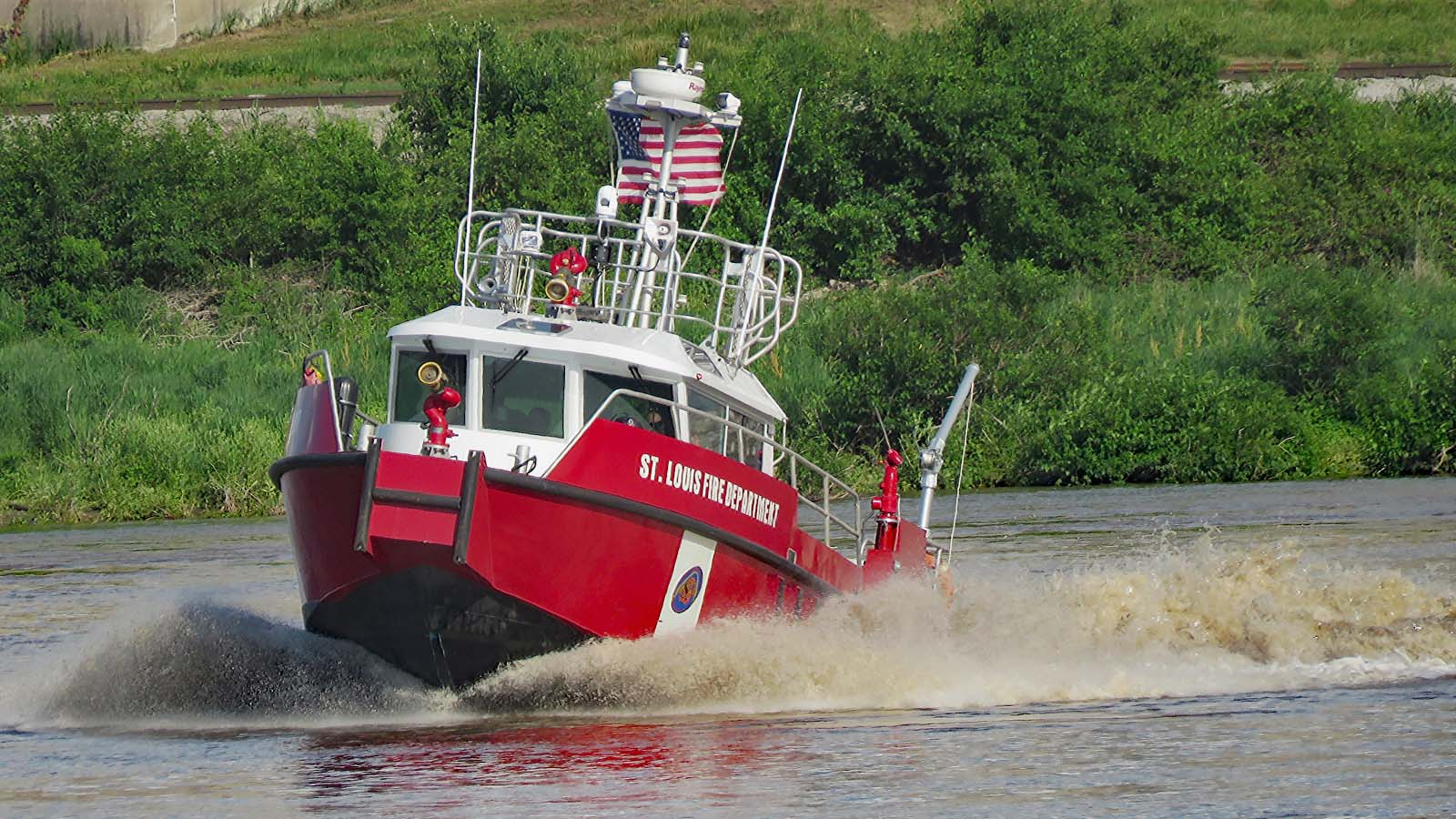
- Stan Musial on the Mississippi River

History

St. Louis Fire Department
- Name: Stan Musial
- Namesake: Stan Musial
- Owner: St. Louis Fire Department
- Operator: STLFD Marine Division
- Builder: MetalCraft Marine
- Launched: October 30, 2013
- Sponsored by: Department of Homeland Security
- Christened: September 30, 2013
- In service: in active service
- Homeport: Port of St. Louis
- Identification: Marine Unit # 6
- Status: In use

General characteristics
- Length: 44 feet (13 m)
- Speed: 38 knots (70 km/h; 44 mph)
- Crew: 12

Stan Musial is a fireboat stationed in the Port of St. Louis in Missouri. Commissioned in September 2013, she is named after Stan Musial, a St. Louis sports figure, with a long association with the St. Louis Cardinals baseball team. The 44-foot (13 m) craft has the ability to pump 7,000 US gallons per minute (26,000 L/min) from its water cannon and can travel at up to 38 knots (44 mph). She was placed into service on October 30, 2013.
