= Illinois Quantum and Microelectronics Park =

Planned quantum technology campus in Chicago

Coordinates: 41°44′6.17″N 87°32′3.32″W

The Illinois Quantum and Microelectronics Park (IQMP) is a planned 128-acre technology campus on the site of the former U.S. Steel South Works in South Chicago. It will focus on quantum computing.

Plans for the IQMP are part of the larger “Quantum Shore Chicago” redevelopment of the former U.S. Steel South Works site, a long-vacant industrial area in Chicago’s South Chicago neighborhood. The broader project is expected to include a 1 GW data center for AI and cloud computing, advanced manufacturing facilities, research centers, housing, and a replacement hospital, with an initial phase estimated at about $9 billion in investment.

The overall park is expected to cost $9 billion to construct. Work is expected to begin in 2026 and be complete in 2028.

== Tenants ==
PsiQuantum of Palo Alto, California has been announced as the anchor tenant of the IQMP, PsiQuantum intends to build and deploy America’s first million-qubit scale, fault-tolerant quantum computer. Other tenants include the DARPA-Illinois Quantum Proving Ground, IBM, Diraq, Quantum Machines, and Infleqtion. French quantum computing company Pasqal will invest more than $65 million to build its U.S. headquarters there.

== History ==
President of Cook County Board of Commissioners Toni Preckwinkle, Chicago Mayor Brandon Johnson, and Illinois Governor JB Pritzker participated in a ceremonial groundbreaking at the site on September 30, 2025. The initial phase of the park, covering approximately 30 acres, is being constructed by Clayco as general contractor and was designed by LJC Design & Engineering. Related Midwest and CRG are co-developing the campus; the initial phase is scheduled for completion in 2027.

Friends of the Parks, ETHOS and Alliance of the Southeast organized to request a community benefits agreement for the development of the quantum campus, asking that 25% of full-time employees hired in the first three years are residents of the surrounding area.

== Community response ==
The proposal has generated local debate, with some community groups expressing concerns about potential gentrification, environmental cleanup risks, and the availability of jobs for nearby residents, while supporters argue the development could help reverse decades of economic decline in the area.

== See also ==
- Cloud-based quantum computing
- Timeline of quantum computing and communication
