= St. Louis Port Authority =

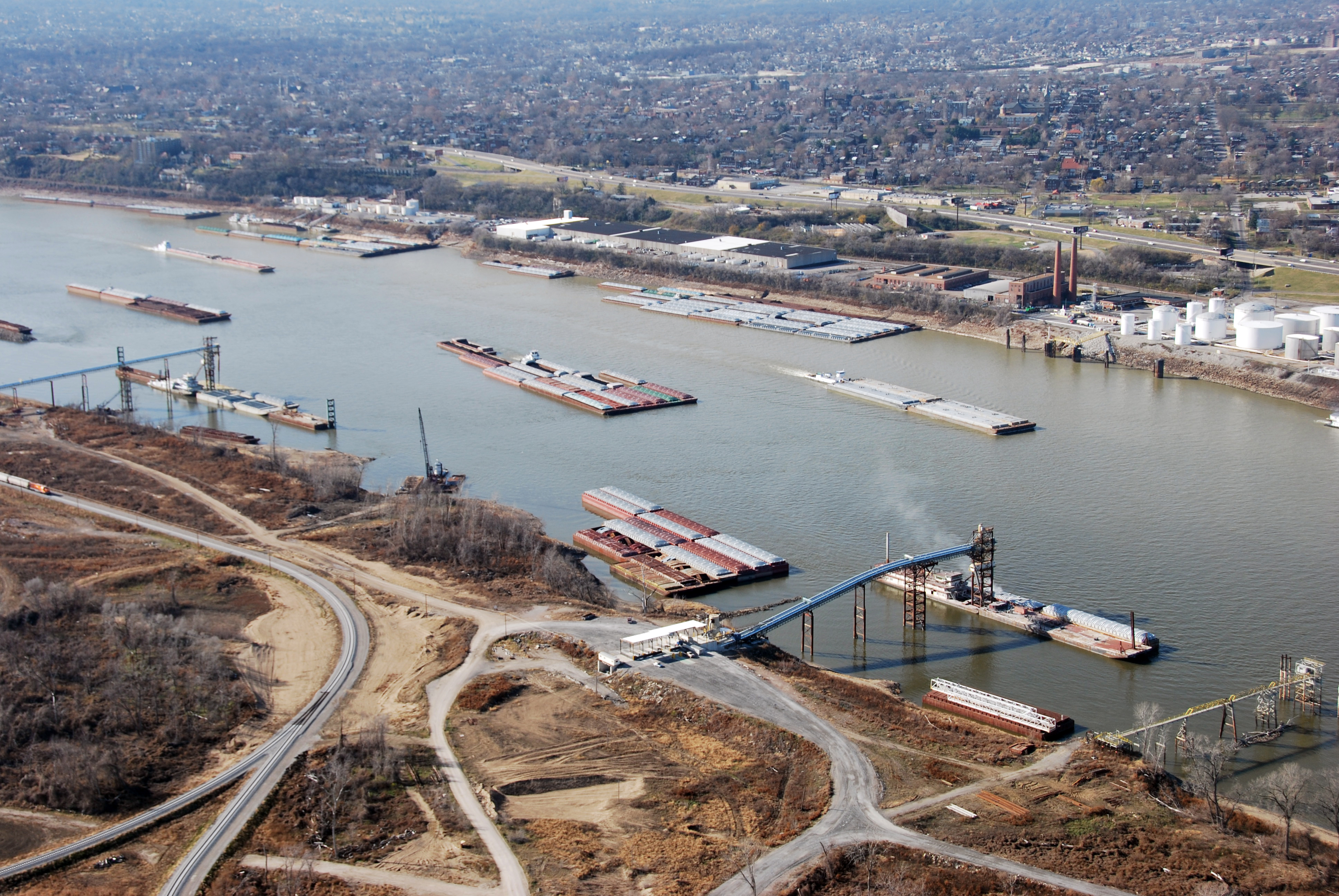
Barges on the Mississippi near the Port of St. Louis, 2012

The St. Louis Port Authority is responsible for managing the facilities that make St. Louis, Missouri, the United States' second-busiest inland port. St. Louis is the northernmost port on the Mississippi River that is free of canal locks and is ice-free year-round. Twenty-nine industrial centers with a population of 90 million can be reached from St. Louis by barge.
