= Michael Butler (politician) =

American politician

Chair of the Missouri Democratic Party
- In office December 12, 2020 – March 18, 2023
- Preceded by: Jean Peters Baker
- Succeeded by: Russ Carnahan

Member of the Missouri House of Representatives from the 79th district
- In office January 9, 2013 – January 9, 2019
- Preceded by: Mary Nichols
- Succeeded by: LaKeySha Frazier-Bosley

Personal details
- Party: Democratic
- Education: Alabama A&M University (BA); University of Missouri (MPA)

Michael Butler is an American politician who currently serves as the St. Louis Recorder of Deeds. He previously served in the Missouri House of Representatives.

== Early life and career ==
Michael Butler was raised in the Shaw neighborhood in St. Louis. He holds a bachelor's degree in business from Alabama A&M University, where he was the student body president, and a master's degree in public affairs from the University of Missouri. He worked as a legislative aide to Representative Mary Still and to Senator Robin Wright-Jones.

== Legislature ==
In the 2012 general election, Butler was elected to the Missouri House of Representatives from the 79th district. He was reelected in 2014 and 2016. In his final term, he served as the Minority Caucus Chair.

== Recorder of Deeds ==
Butler was elected St. Louis Recorder of Deeds in 2018 and reelected in 2022. While recorder he served as the chairman of the Missouri Democratic Party from 2020 until 2023.

Missouri House of Representatives
Preceded by Mary Nichols	Member of the Missouri House of Representatives from the 79th district 2013–2019	Succeeded by LaKeySha Frazier-Bosley
Party political offices
Preceded by Jean Peters Baker	Chair of the Missouri Democratic Party; 2020–2023	Succeeded by Russ Carnahan
