= Cara Spencer =

Mayor of St. Louis since 2025

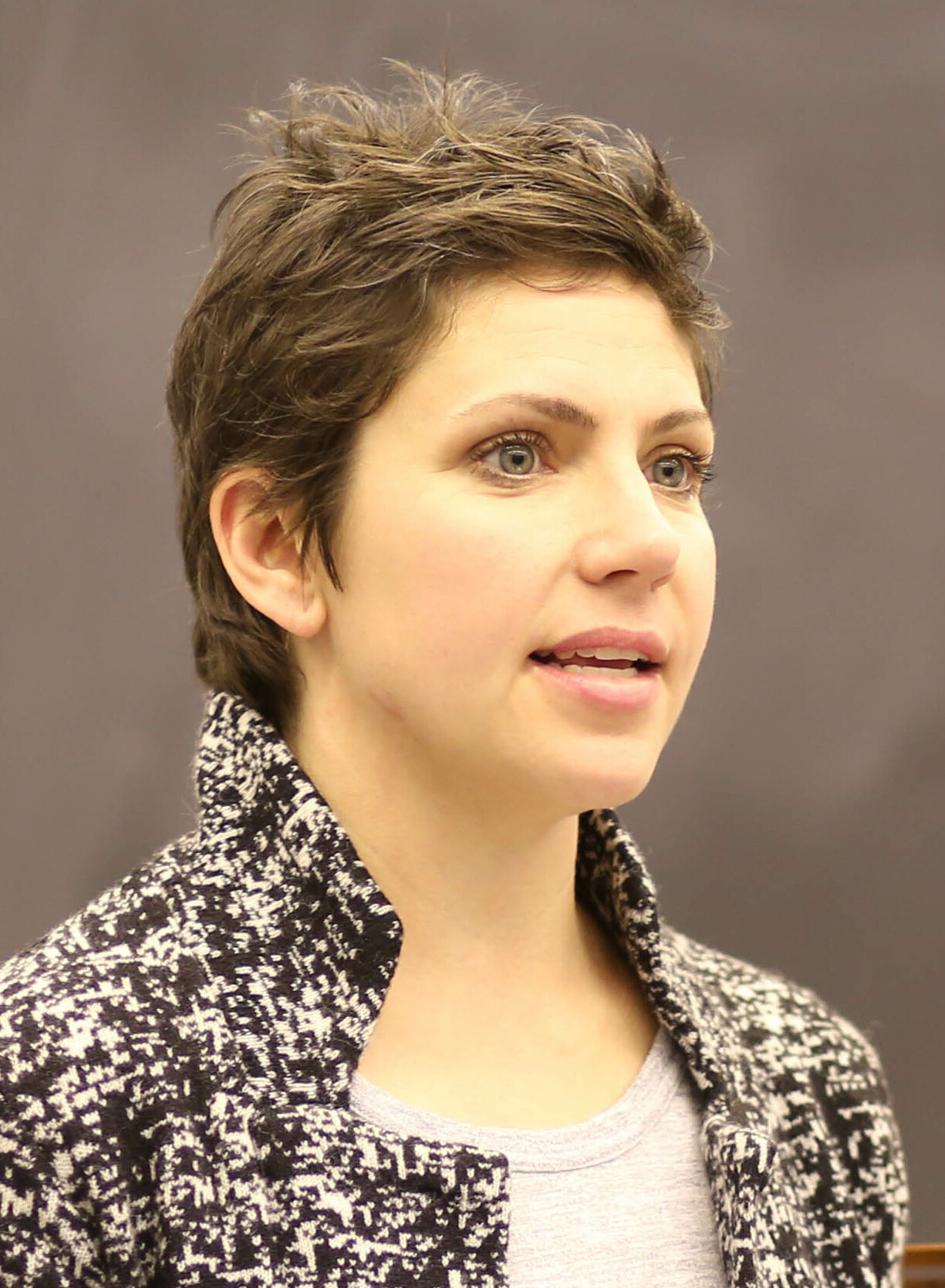
- Spencer in 2017

48th Mayor of St. Louis
- Incumbent
- Assumed office April 15, 2025
- Preceded by: Tishaura Jones

Member of the St. Louis Board of Aldermen
- In office April 21, 2015 – April 15, 2025
- Preceded by: Craig Schmid
- Succeeded by: Jami Cox Antwi
- Constituency: Ward 20 (2015–2023); Ward 8 (2023–2025)

Personal details
- Born: September 11, 1978 (age 48) St. Louis, Missouri, U.S.
- Party: Democratic
- Education: Truman State University (BS)

Cara Spencer (born September 11, 1978) is an American politician serving as the 48th and current mayor of St. Louis, Missouri. She served on the St. Louis Board of Aldermen as alderwoman of Ward 8 from 2023 to 2025; she represented Ward 20 from 2015 to 2023.

Spencer ran in the 2021 St. Louis mayoral election, finishing second in the primary election, then losing the general election to Tishaura Jones. In the 2025 election, she defeated Jones. She is the city's third consecutive female mayor.

== Early life and education ==
Spencer grew up in South St. Louis City and St. Louis County. She is a graduate of Parkway South High School in west St. Louis County. She earned a Bachelor of Science degree in mathematics from Truman State University.

Before becoming an elected official, Spencer did mathematical modeling for the St. Louis-based company Tessellon.

In 2010 or 2011, she had a son.

== Politics ==
Spencer served on the St. Louis Board of Aldermen, she represented Ward 8, which consists of Downtown St. Louis, Soulard, and Lafayette Square. Between 2015 and 2023, she represented Ward 20, which included the South St. Louis neighborhoods of Dutchtown, Gravois Park, Marine Villa, and Mount Pleasant.

=== Board of Aldermen - Ward 20 ===
Spencer was elected an alderman in April 2015 after defeating incumbent Craig Schmid, who had held the seat for two decades, in the Democratic primary election. She then defeated independent candidate Stephen Jehle and Green Party candidate Vickie Ingram in the general election.

During her first term in office, she was the primary sponsor of legislation that enacted stricter campaign finance laws, imposed stricter air pollution standards than state requirements on asbestos in demolitions, required absentee landlords to pay fines for building code violations, imposed fines on payday lending operators, and protected victims of drug overdose by enacting the 1st municipal good Samaritan law in the US, granting immunity to drug possession charges to anyone calling 911 for help during an overdose. Spencer co-developed and helped implement the "mow-to-own" program allowing residents to obtain an adjacent city-owned lot by mowing it for one year. Spencer helped stop the St. Louis Lambert International Airport from being privatized.

In 2016, an ethics complaint was filed against Spencer by attorney Jane Dueker, alleging that Spencer failed to disclose a personal financial interest related to legislation she introduced regulating payday lending. The case was dismissed.

Spencer was re-elected in 2019.

In August 2020, Spencer was the target of a petition to recall her from her position as alderwoman. The petition was organized by Metropolitan Strategies and Solution, a consulting firm that supported privatization efforts.

Spencer served as the chair of the Health and Human Services Committee.

=== 2021 St. Louis mayoral election ===
On January 13, 2020, Spencer announced her intention to run for mayor of St. Louis in 2021. The 2021 election was the city's first use of approval voting. Spencer, along with Board of Aldermen President Lewis Reed, were endorsed by the St. Louis Post-Dispatch Editorial Board in a joint endorsement (since voters could now select more than one candidate in the primary election). Spencer was also endorsed by the Planned Parenthood Advocates of the St. Louis Region and Southwest Missouri and former St. Louis mayor Vincent C. Schoemehl.

Spencer, alongside St. Louis treasurer Tishaura Jones, advanced to the general election after the primary on March 2, 2021. Spencer was defeated by Jones in the general election held on April 6, 2021.

=== Board of Aldermen - Ward 8 ===
Following the city's 2021 redistricting and reduction of the number of wards, Spencer was elected alderman for Ward 8 in 2023. She served as chair of the Budget and Public Employees Committee, and vice-chair of the Transportation and Commerce Committee.

=== 2025 St. Louis mayoral election ===
On May 23, 2024, Spencer declared her second bid for mayor of St. Louis in 2025, challenging the incumbent Jones. Her campaign received a high profile donation from Bob Clark, who said his $111,330.25 contribution matched the cost of his rejected proposal to build a Concrete Strategies facility in North City.

On March 4, Spencer won the nonpartisan primary for mayor of St. Louis, earning 68% of the vote. On April 8, 2025, Spencer defeated Jones in the general election, receiving 64.2% of the popular vote.

== Mayor of St. Louis ==
On April 15, 2025, Spencer was sworn in as the 48th mayor of St. Louis.

On May 16, the 2025 St. Louis tornado traversed central and north city, killing five city residents, damaging an estimated 5,000 buildings, as well as MetroLink infrastructure, and cutting off power for an estimated 90,000 people. In response to criticism for the lack of tornado sirens, Spencer placed the emergency management chief on leave. It was later found that the fire department's warning system was inoperable. A statement made by Spencer in an early public address, "do not self-deploy," was later parodied by volunteer emergency recovery organizers at the Action St. Louis hub.

In June, the Board of Aldermen allocated $30 million from the Rams settlement funds for tornado recovery, and in July Spencer announced an additional allocation of $19.2 million. Clayco executives described as being "embedded" in city hall were designated to lead private sector contributions to recovery.

Political offices
Preceded by Tishaura Jones	Mayor of St. Louis; 2025–present	Incumbent
