= 2024 Missouri House of Representatives election =

2024 Missouri House of Representatives elections
- November 5, 2024

All 163 seats in the Missouri House of Representatives 82 seats needed for a majority
	Majority party	Minority party
Leader	Dean Plocher (term-limited)	Crystal Quade (term-limited)
Party	Republican	Democratic
Leader's seat	89th - St Louis	132nd - Springfield
Last election	111	52
Seats won	111	52
Seat change	Steady	Steady
Popular vote	1,701,567	1,037,432
Percentage	61.69%	37.61%
Swing	▼4.10(pp)	▲4.15(pp)
- Republican gain Democratic gain Republican hold Democratic hold 50–60% 60–70% 70–80% 80–90% >90% 50–60% 60–70% 70–80% 80–90% >90% 50–60% 60–70% 70–80% 80–90% >90% 50–60% 60–70% 70–80% 80–90% >90%
Speaker before election
Dean Plocher
Republican
Elected Speaker
Jon Patterson
Republican

The 2024 Missouri House of Representatives election took place on November 5, 2024, as part of the biennial 2024 United States elections. It was held alongside numerous other federal, state, and local elections, including the 2024 U.S. presidential election and the 2024 Missouri Senate election. All 163 seats in the Missouri House of Representatives were up for election. Primary elections took place on August 6, 2024.

== Partisan background ==
In the 2020 Presidential Election, Donald Trump won 108 Missouri House districts, while Joe Biden won 55. Going into the 2024 Missouri House election, Republicans hold five districts where Biden won: District 17 (Clay County, Biden +6%), District 96 (St. Louis County, Biden +2%), District 100 (St. Louis County, Biden +1%), District 101 (St. Louis County, Biden +1%), and District 105 (Saint Charles County, Biden +2%). Conversely, Democrats hold two districts where Trump won: District 29 (Jackson County, Trump +0.6%) and District 136 (Springfield, Trump +1%).

2020 Presidential data by House district: Trump: 40–50% 50–60%; 60–70%; 70–80%; 80–90%; Biden: 40–50%; 50–60%; 60–70%; 70–80%; 80–90%; 90–100%

== Retirements ==
Forty-seven incumbents did not seek re-election.

=== Democrats ===
1. District 15: Maggie Nurrenbern retired to run for State Senate.
2. District 19: Ingrid Burnett was term-limited.
3. District 21: Robert Sauls retired to run for State Senate.
4. District 25: Patty Lewis retired to run for State Senate.
5. District 26: Ashley Bland Manlove retired.
6. District 27: Richard Brown was term-limited (ran for Lieutenant Governor).
7. District 28: Jerome Barnes was term-limited.
8. District 50: Douglas Mann retired.
9. District 67: Chantelle Nickson-Clark retired to run for State Senate.
10. District 68: Jay Mosley was term-limited.
11. District 70: Gretchen Bangert was term-limited (ran for St. Louis County Council).
12. District 74: Kevin Windham Jr. retired.
13. District 75: Alan Gray was term-limited.
14. District 80: Peter Merideth was term-limited.
15. District 82: Donna Baringer was term-limited.
16. District 83: Sarah Unsicker was term-limited.
17. District 86: Joe Adams was term-limited.
18. District 87: Paula Brown retired.
19. District 90: Barbara Phifer retired to run for Secretary of State.
20. District 98: Deb Lavender was term-limited.
21. District 132: Crystal Quade was term-limited (ran for Governor).

=== Republicans ===
1. District 20: Aaron McMullen retired to run for State Senate.
2. District 31: Dan Stacy was term-limited.
3. District 39: Doug Richey retired to run for State Senate.
4. District 44: Cheri Toalson Reisch was term-limited (ran for Boone County Commission).
5. District 51: Kurtis Gregory retired to run for State Senate.
6. District 54: Dan Houx was term-limited (ran for State Senate).
7. District 55: Mike Haffner retired to run for State Senate.
8. District 69: Adam Schnelting retired to run for State Senate.
9. District 89: Dean Plocher was term-limited (ran for Secretary of State).
10. District 104: Phil Christofanelli was term-limited (ran for State Senate).
11. District 105: Adam Schwadron retired to run for Secretary of State.
12. District 108: Justin Hicks retired to run for U.S. House.
13. District 115: Cyndi Buchheit-Courtway retired to run for State Senate.
14. District 117: Mike Henderson was term-limited (ran for State Senate).
15. District 120: Ron Copeland retired.
16. District 128: Mike Stephens was term-limited.
17. District 138: Brad Hudson retired to run for State Senate.
18. District 141: Hannah Kelly was term-limited.
19. District 144: Chris Dinkins retired to run for State Senate.
20. District 145: Rick Francis was term-limited.
21. District 148: Jamie Burger retired to run for State Senate.
22. District 151: Herman Morse retired.
23. District 153: Darrell Atchison retired.
24. District 154: David Evans retired.
25. District 155: Travis Smith retired to run for State Senate.
26. District 163: Cody Smith was term-limited (ran for Treasurer).

== Resignation ==
One seat was vacant on the day of the general election due to a resignation in 2023.

=== Democrats ===
1. District 78: Rasheen Aldridge Jr. resigned April 18, 2023, after being elected to the St. Louis Board of Aldermen.

== Incumbents defeated ==
=== In primary election ===
Five incumbent representatives, all Republicans, were defeated in the August 6 primary election.

==== Republicans ====
1. District 33: Chris Sander lost renomination to Carolyn Caton.
2. District 64: Tony Lovasco lost renomination to Deanna Self.
3. District 109: Kyle Marquart lost renomination to John Simmons.
4. District 111: Gary Bonacker lost renomination to Cecelie Williams.
5. District 123: Lisa Thomas lost renomination to Jeff Vernetti.

== Overview ==
=== Election ===
2024 Missouri House of Representatives election General election — November 5, 2024
Missouri_State_House_2022
Party	Votes	Percentage	Seats	+/–
Republican	1,701,567	61.69	111	Steady
Democratic	1,037,432	37.61	52	Steady
Libertarian	18,254	0.66	0	Steady
Green	1,168	0.04	0	Steady
Valid votes	2,758,421	100	—	—
Invalid votes	—	—	—	—
Totals	2,758,421	100	163	—

== Predictions ==
Source	Ranking	As of
CNalysis	Solid R	April 7, 2024

== Detailed Results ==
=== District 1 ===
1st District Republican primary details
Jeff Farnan

Organizations

- Missouri Right to Life PAC

Republican Primary, 1st District
Party	Candidate	Votes	%
Republican	Jeff Farnan (Incumbent)	11,034	77.5
Republican	Michelle Horner	1,824	22.5
Total votes		8,110	100.00

2024 Missouri House of Representatives election, 1st District
Party	Candidate	Votes	%
Republican	Jeff Farnan (incumbent)	Unopposed	
Total votes		15,770	100.0

=== District 2 ===
2nd District Republican primary details
Mazzie Christensen

Organizations

- Missouri Right to Life PAC

Republican Primary, 2nd District
Party	Candidate	Votes	%
Republican	Mazzie Christensen (incumbent)	Unopposed	
Total votes		6,412	100.0

2024 Missouri House of Representatives election, 2nd District
Party	Candidate	Votes	%
Republican	Mazzie Christensen (incumbent)	Unopposed	
Total votes		15,873	100.0

=== District 3 ===
3rd District Republican primary details
Danny Busick

Organizations

- Missouri Right to Life PAC

Republican Primary, 3rd District
Party	Candidate	Votes	%
Republican	Danny Busick (incumbent)	Unopposed	
Total votes		5,451	100.0

2024 Missouri House of Representatives election, 3rd District
Party	Candidate	Votes	%
Republican	Danny Busick (incumbent)	Unopposed	
Total votes		13,811	100.0

=== District 4 ===
4th District Democratic primary details

Democratic Primary, 4th District
Party	Candidate	Votes	%
Democratic	Melissa Jo Viloria	Unopposed	
Total votes		693	100.0

4th District Republican primary details

Republican Primary, 4th District
Party	Candidate	Votes	%
Republican	Greg Sharpe (incumbent)	Unopposed	
Total votes		4,963	100.0

2024 Missouri House of Representatives election, 4th District
Party	Candidate	Votes	%
Republican	Greg Sharpe (incumbent)	14,066	82.83
Democratic	Melissa Jo Viloria	2,916	17.17
Total votes		16,982	100.00
Republican hold			

=== District 5 ===
5th District Republican primary details
Louis Riggs

Organizations

- Missouri Right to Life PAC

Republican Primary, 5th District
Party	Candidate	Votes	%
Republican	Louis Riggs (incumbent)	Unopposed	
Total votes		5,154	100.0

2024 Missouri House of Representatives election, 5th District
Party	Candidate	Votes	%
Republican	Louis Riggs (incumbent)	Unopposed	
Total votes		16,446	100.0

=== District 6 ===
6th District Democratic primary details

Democratic Primary, 6th District
Party	Candidate	Votes	%
Democratic	John Akins	Unopposed	
Total votes		705	100.0

6th District Republican primary details
Ed Lewis

Organizations

- Missouri Right to Life PAC

Republican Primary, 6th District
Party	Candidate	Votes	%
Republican	Ed Lewis (incumbent)	Unopposed	
Total votes		5,276	100.0

2024 Missouri House of Representatives election, 6th District
Party	Candidate	Votes	%
Republican	Ed Lewis (incumbent)	13,234	78.51
Democratic	John Akins	3,622	21.49
Total votes		16,856	100.00
Republican hold			

=== District 7 ===
7th District Democratic primary details

Democratic Primary, 7th District
Party	Candidate	Votes	%
Democratic	Terrence Fiala	Unopposed	
Total votes		846	100.0

7th District Republican primary details

Republican Primary, 7th District
Party	Candidate	Votes	%
Republican	Peggy McGaugh (incumbent)	Unopposed	
Total votes		6,610	100.0

2024 Missouri House of Representatives election, 7th District
Party	Candidate	Votes	%
Republican	Peggy McGaugh (incumbent)	14,814	81.35
Democratic	Terrence Fiala	3,396	18.65
Total votes		18,210	100.00
Republican hold			

=== District 8 ===
8th District Democratic primary details

Democratic Primary, 8th District
Party	Candidate	Votes	%
Democratic	Sandy Van Wagner	Unopposed	
Total votes		1,742	100.0

8th District Republican primary details

Republican Primary, 8th District
Party	Candidate	Votes	%
Republican	Josh Hurlbert (incumbent)	Unopposed	
Total votes		4,790	100.0

2024 Missouri House of Representatives election, 8th District
Party	Candidate	Votes	%
Republican	Josh Hurlbert (incumbent)	15,167	68.59
Democratic	Sandy Van Wagner	6,946	31.41
Total votes		22,113	100.00
Republican hold			

=== District 9 ===
9th District Republican primary details

Republican Primary, 9th District
Party	Candidate	Votes	%
Republican	Dean Van Schoiack (incumbent)	Unopposed	
Total votes		4,598	100.0

2024 Missouri House of Representatives election, 9th District
Party	Candidate	Votes	%
Republican	Dean Van Schoiack (incumbent)	Unopposed	
Total votes		15,866	100.0

=== District 10 ===
10th District Democratic primary details

Democratic Primary, 10th District
Party	Candidate	Votes	%
Democratic	Andrew Gibson	Unopposed	
Total votes		1,646	100.0

10th District Republican primary details

Republican Primary, 10th District
Party	Candidate	Votes	%
Republican	Bill Falkner (incumbent)	Unopposed	
Total votes		2,440	100.0

2024 Missouri House of Representatives election, 10th District
Party	Candidate	Votes	%
Republican	Bill Falkner (incumbent)	8,154	61.95
Democratic	Andrew Gibson	5,009	38.05
Total votes		13,163	100.00
Republican hold			

=== District 11 ===
11th District Republican primary details

Republican Primary, 11th District
Party	Candidate	Votes	%
Republican	Brenda Shields (incumbent)	Unopposed	
Total votes		3,670	100.0

2024 Missouri House of Representatives election, 11th District
Party	Candidate	Votes	%
Republican	Brenda Shields (incumbent)	Unopposed	
Total votes		14,119	100.0

=== District 12 ===
12th District Democratic primary details

Democratic Primary, 12th District
Party	Candidate	Votes	%
Democratic	Jamie Johnson (incumbent)	Unopposed	
Total votes		2,457	100.0

12th District Republican primary details

Republican Primary, 12th District
Party	Candidate	Votes	%
Republican	Mike Jones	Unopposed	
Total votes		2,633	100.0

2024 Missouri House of Representatives election, 12th District
Party	Candidate	Votes	%
Republican	Mike Jones	10,131	50.45
Democratic	Jamie Johnson (incumbent)	9,952	49.55
Total votes		20,083	100.00
Republican gain from Democratic			

=== District 13 ===
13th District Democratic primary details

Democratic Primary, 13th District
Party	Candidate	Votes	%
Democratic	Andrea Denning	Unopposed	
Total votes		1,810	100.0

13th District Republican primary details

Republican Primary, 13th District
Party	Candidate	Votes	%
Republican	Sean Pouche (incumbent)	Unopposed	
Total votes		4,515	100.0

2024 Missouri House of Representatives election, 13th District
Party	Candidate	Votes	%
Republican	Sean Pouche (incumbent)	14,444	66.52
Democratic	Andrea Denning	7,271	33.48
Total votes		21,715	100.00
Republican hold			

=== District 14 ===
14th District Democratic primary details

Democratic Primary, 14th District
Party	Candidate	Votes	%
Democratic	Ashley Aune (incumbent)	Unopposed	
Total votes		2,870	100.0

14th District Republican primary details

Republican Primary, 14th District
Party	Candidate	Votes	%
Republican	Frank Pendleton	Unopposed	
Total votes		2,688	100.0

2024 Missouri House of Representatives election, 14th District
Party	Candidate	Votes	%
Democratic	Ashley Aune (incumbent)	10,959	54.55
Republican	Frank Pendleton	9,132	45.45
Total votes		20,091	100.0
Democratic hold			

=== District 15 ===
15th District Democratic primary details

Primary Election Results
Party	Candidate	Votes	%
Democratic Party Primary Results
Democratic	Kenneth Jamison	1,718	61.73%
Democratic	Greg Smith	1,065	38.27%
Total votes		2,783	100.00%

15th District Republican primary details
Mike Jones

Organizations

- Missouri Right to Life PAC

Republican Primary, 15th District
Party	Candidate	Votes	%
Republican	Mike Jones	Unopposed	
Total votes		2,240	100.0

2024 Missouri House of Representatives election, 15th District
Party	Candidate	Votes	%
Democratic	Kenneth Jamieson	9,618	52.96
Republican	Mike Jones	8,543	47.04
Total votes		18,161	100.0
Democratic hold			

=== District 16 ===
16th District Democratic primary details

Democratic Primary, 16th District
Party	Candidate	Votes	%
Democratic	Gloria Young	Unopposed	
Total votes		2,305	100.0

16th District Republican primary details

Republican Primary, 16th District
Party	Candidate	Votes	%
Republican	Chris Brown (incumbent)	Unopposed	
Total votes		2,431	100.0

2024 Missouri House of Representatives election, 16th District
Party	Candidate	Votes	%
Republican	Chris Brown (incumbent)	11,001	55.70
Democratic	Gloria Young	8,750	44.30
Total votes		19,751	100.00
Republican hold			

=== District 17 ===
17th District Democratic primary details

Democratic Primary, 17th District
Party	Candidate	Votes	%
Democratic	Shirley Mata	Unopposed	
Total votes		1,938	100.0

17th District Republican primary details

Republican Primary, 17th District
Party	Candidate	Votes	%
Republican	Bill Allen (incumbent)	Unopposed	
Total votes		2,193	100.0

2024 Missouri House of Representatives election, 17th District
Party	Candidate	Votes	%
Republican	Bill Allen (incumbent)	8,992	51.84
Democratic	Shirley Mata	8,353	48.16
Total votes		17,345	100.00
Republican hold			

=== District 18 ===
18th District Democratic primary details

Democratic Primary, 18th District
Party	Candidate	Votes	%
Democratic	Eric Woods (incumbent)	Unopposed	
Total votes		2,543	100.0

2024 Missouri House of Representatives election, 18th District
Party	Candidate	Votes	%
Democratic	Eric Woods (incumbent)	Unopposed	
Total votes		12,050	100.0

=== District 19 ===
19th District Democratic primary details

Primary Election Results
Party	Candidate	Votes	%
Democratic Party Primary Results
Democratic	Wick Thomas	951	50.56%
Democratic	Patricia Geronima Hernandez	930	49.44%
Total votes		1,881	100.00%

19th District Republican primary details
Karen Spalding

Organizations

- Missouri Right to Life PAC

Republican Primary, 19th District
Party	Candidate	Votes	%
Republican	Karen Spalding	Unopposed	
Total votes		312	100.0

2024 Missouri House of Representatives election, 19th District
Party	Candidate	Votes	%
Democratic	Wick Thomas	6,373	74.46
Republican	Karen I Spalding	2,186	25.54
Total votes		8,559	100.0
Democratic hold			

=== District 20 ===
20th District Democratic primary details

Democratic Primary, 20th District
Party	Candidate	Votes	%
Democratic	Clarence Franklin, Jr.	Unopposed	
Total votes		2,152	100.0

20th District Republican primary details

Republican Primary, 20th District
Party	Candidate	Votes	%
Republican	Mike Steinmeyer	Unopposed	
Total votes		2,825	100.0

2024 Missouri House of Representatives election, 20th District
Party	Candidate	Votes	%
Republican	Mike Steinmeyer	9,664	59.39
Democratic	Clarence Franklin, Jr.	6,608	40.61
Total votes		16,272	100.00
Republican hold			

=== District 21 ===
21st District Democratic primary details

Democratic Primary, 21st District
Party	Candidate	Votes	%
Democratic	Will Jobe	Unopposed	
Total votes		1,750	100.0

21st District Republican primary details
Marjain Breitenbach

Organizations

- Missouri Right to Life PAC

Republican Primary, 21st District
Party	Candidate	Votes	%
Republican	Marjain Breitenbach	Unopposed	
Total votes		1,572	100.0

2024 Missouri House of Representatives election, 21st District
Party	Candidate	Votes	%
Democratic	Will Jobe	5,922	51.35
Republican	Marjain Breitenbach	5,610	48.65
Total votes		11,532	100.0
Democratic hold			

=== District 22 ===
22nd District Democratic primary details

Democratic Primary, 22nd District
Party	Candidate	Votes	%
Democratic	Yolanda Young (incumbent)	Unopposed	
Total votes		2,915	100.0

22nd District Republican primary details

Republican Primary, 22nd District
Party	Candidate	Votes	%
Republican	Mireya Barragan	Unopposed	
Total votes		735	100.0

2024 Missouri House of Representatives election, 22nd District
Party	Candidate	Votes	%
Democratic	Yolanda Young (incumbent)	9,516	77.33
Republican	Mireya Barragan	2,790	22.67
Total votes		12,306	100.0
Democratic hold			

=== District 23 ===
23rd District Democratic primary details

Democratic Primary, 23rd District
Party	Candidate	Votes	%
Democratic	Michael Johnson (incumbent)	Unopposed	
Total votes		1,992	100.0

23rd District Republican primary details

Republican Primary, 23rd District
Party	Candidate	Votes	%
Republican	Daniel Contreras	Unopposed	
Total votes		134	100.0

2024 Missouri House of Representatives election, 23rd District
Party	Candidate	Votes	%
Democratic	Michael Johnson (incumbent)	6,782	85.97
Republican	Daniel P. Contreras	1,107	14.03
Total votes		7,889	100.0
Democratic hold			

=== District 24 ===
24th District Democratic primary details

Democratic Primary, 24th District
Party	Candidate	Votes	%
Democratic	Emily Weber (incumbent)	Unopposed	
Total votes		4,578	100.0

24th District Republican primary details

Republican Primary, 24th District
Party	Candidate	Votes	%
Republican	Claudia Toomim	Unopposed	
Total votes		340	100.0

2024 Missouri House of Representatives election, 24th District
Party	Candidate	Votes	%
Democratic	Emily Weber (incumbent)	14,797	85.03
Republican	Claudia S Toomim	2,604	14.97
Total votes		17,401	100.0
Democratic hold			

=== District 25 ===
25th District Democratic primary details

Democratic Primary, 25th District
Party	Candidate	Votes	%
Democratic	Pattie Mansur	Unopposed	
Total votes		7,375	100.0

25th District Republican primary details

Republican Primary, 25th District
Party	Candidate	Votes	%
Republican	Steven Bright	Unopposed	
Total votes		1,221	100.0

2024 Missouri House of Representatives election, 25th District
Party	Candidate	Votes	%
Democratic	Pattie Mansur	17,477	76.74
Republican	Steven Bright	5,297	23.26
Total votes		22,774	100.0
Democratic hold			

=== District 26 ===
26th District Democratic primary details

Democratic Primary, 26th District
Party	Candidate	Votes	%
Democratic	Tiffany Price	Unopposed	
Total votes		3,622	100.0

26th District Republican primary details
Anthony Zarantonello

Organizations

- Missouri Right to Life PAC

Republican Primary, 26th District
Party	Candidate	Votes	%
Republican	Anthony Zarantonello	Unopposed	
Total votes		386	100.0

2024 Missouri House of Representatives election, 26th District
Party	Candidate	Votes	%
Democratic	Tiffany Price	11,150	83.76
Republican	Anthony Zarantonello	2,162	16.24
Total votes		13,312	100.0
Democratic hold			

=== District 27 ===
27th District Democratic primary details

Democratic Primary, 27th District
Party	Candidate	Votes	%
Democratic	Melissa A. Douglas	Unopposed	
Total votes		3,950	100.0

2024 Missouri House of Representatives election, 27th District
Party	Candidate	Votes	%
Democratic	Melissa A. Douglas	Unopposed	
Total votes		12,696	100.0

=== District 28 ===
28th District Democratic primary details

Democratic Primary, 28th District
Party	Candidate	Votes	%
Democratic	Donna Barnes	2,633	73.2
Democratic	Mike Sager	962	26.8
Total votes		3,595	100.00

28th District Republican primary details

Republican Primary, 28th District
Party	Candidate	Votes	%
Republican	Steven W. Hinton	Unopposed	
Total votes		1,349	100.0

2024 Missouri House of Representatives election, 28th District
Party	Candidate	Votes	%
Democratic	Donna Barnes	10,287	68.22
Republican	Steven W. Hinton	4,792	31.78
Total votes		15,079	100.0
Democratic hold			

=== District 29 ===
29th District Democratic primary details

Democratic Primary, 29th District
Party	Candidate	Votes	%
Democratic	Aaron Crossley (incumbent)	Unopposed	
Total votes		3,191	100.0

29th District Republican primary details
Robert Bruette

Organizations

- Missouri Right to Life PAC

Republican Primary, 29th District
Party	Candidate	Votes	%
Republican	Robert Bruette	Unopposed	
Total votes		2,756	100.0

2024 Missouri House of Representatives election, 29th District
Party	Candidate	Votes	%
Democratic	Aaron Crossley (incumbent)	9,572	56.19
Republican	Robert A. Bruette	7,462	43.81
Total votes		17,034	100.0
Democratic hold			

=== District 30 ===
30th District Democratic primary details

Democratic Primary, 30th District
Party	Candidate	Votes	%
Democratic	Kevin Grover	Unopposed	
Total votes		3,312	100.0

30th District Republican primary details

Republican Primary, 30th District
Party	Candidate	Votes	%
Republican	Jon Patterson (incumbent)	Unopposed	
Total votes		3,059	100.0

2024 Missouri House of Representatives election, 30th District
Party	Candidate	Votes	%
Republican	Jonathan Patterson (incumbent)	11,830	53.91
Democratic	Kevin Grover	9.854	44.90
Green	Frank Lawrence	261	1.19
Total votes		21,945	100.00
Republican hold			

=== District 31 ===
31st District Democratic primary details

Democratic Primary, 31st District
Party	Candidate	Votes	%
Democratic	Jeremy Rowan	Unopposed	
Total votes		2,529	100.0

31st District Republican primary details

Republican Primary, 31st District
Party	Candidate	Votes	%
Republican	Ron Fowler	Unopposed	
Total votes		3,078	100.0

2024 Missouri House of Representatives election, 31st District
Party	Candidate	Votes	%
Republican	Ron Fowler	10,665	55.65
Democratic	Jeremy Rowan	8,501	44.35
Total votes		19,166	100.00
Republican hold			

=== District 32 ===
32nd District Democratic primary details

Democratic Primary, 32nd District
Party	Candidate	Votes	%
Democratic	Jennifer Cassidy	Unopposed	
Total votes		1,671	100.0

32nd District Republican primary details
Jeff Coleman

Organizations

- Missouri Right to Life PAC

Republican Primary, 32nd District
Party	Candidate	Votes	%
Republican	Jeff Coleman (incumbent)	Unopposed	
Total votes		3,838	100.0

2024 Missouri House of Representatives election, 32nd District
Party	Candidate	Votes	%
Republican	Jeff Coleman (incumbent)	13,067	66.63
Democratic	Jennifer Cassidy	6,544	33.37
Total votes		19,611	100.00
Republican hold			

=== District 33 ===
33rd District Republican primary details
Chris Sander

Organizations

- Missouri Right to Life PAC

Republican Primary, 33rd District
Party	Candidate	Votes	%
Republican	Carolyn S. Caton	2,188	55.8
Republican	Chris Sander (incumbent)	1,730	44.2
Total votes		3,918	100.00

2024 Missouri House of Representatives election, 33rd District
Party	Candidate	Votes	%
Republican	Carolyn S. Caton	Unopposed	
Total votes		16,427	100.0

=== District 34 ===
34th District Democratic primary details

Democratic Primary, 34th District
Party	Candidate	Votes	%
Democratic	Kemp Strickler (incumbent)	Unopposed	
Total votes		2,812	100.0

34th District Republican primary details
J.C. Crossley

Organizations

- Missouri Right to Life PAC

Republican Primary, 34th District
Party	Candidate	Votes	%
Republican	J.C. Crossley	Unopposed	
Total votes		2,490	100.0

2024 Missouri House of Representatives election, 34th District
Party	Candidate	Votes	%
Democratic	Kemp Strickler (incumbent)	10,172	51.81
Republican	JC Crossley	9,463	48.19
Total votes		19,635	100.0
Democratic hold			

=== District 35 ===
35th District Democratic primary details

Democratic Primary, 35th District
Party	Candidate	Votes	%
Democratic	Keri Ingle (incumbent)	Unopposed	
Total votes		4,207	100.0

35th District Republican primary details

Republican Primary, 35th District
Party	Candidate	Votes	%
Republican	Michael Green	Unopposed	
Total votes		2,566	100.0

2024 Missouri House of Representatives election, 35th District
Party	Candidate	Votes	%
Democratic	Keri Ingle (incumbent)	12,494	57.46
Republican	Michael C. Green	9,249	42.54
Total votes		21,743	100.0
Democratic hold			

=== District 36 ===
36th District Democratic primary details

Democratic Primary, 36th District
Party	Candidate	Votes	%
Democratic	Anthony Ealy (incumbent)	Unopposed	
Total votes		3,308	100.0

36th District Republican primary details
Dave Thomas

Organizations

- Missouri Right to Life PAC

Republican Primary, 36th District
Party	Candidate	Votes	%
Republican	Dave Thomas	Unopposed	
Total votes		1,512	100.0

2024 Missouri House of Representatives election, 36th District
Party	Candidate	Votes	%
Democratic	Anthony Ealy (incumbent)	9,304	61.57
Republican	Dave Thomas	5,806	38.43
Total votes		21,743	100.0
Democratic hold			

=== District 37 ===
37th District Democratic primary details

Democratic Primary, 37th District
Party	Candidate	Votes	%
Democratic	Mark Sharp (incumbent)	Unopposed	
Total votes		3,375	100.0

2024 Missouri House of Representatives election, 37th District
Party	Candidate	Votes	%
Democratic	Mark Sharp (incumbent)	Unopposed	
Total votes		12,004	100.0

=== District 38 ===
38th District Democratic primary details

Democratic Primary, 38th District
Party	Candidate	Votes	%
Democratic	Martin Jacobs	Unopposed	
Total votes		2,688	100.0

38th District Republican primary details

Republican Primary, 38th District
Party	Candidate	Votes	%
Republican	Chris Lonsdale (incumbent)	Unopposed	
Total votes		3,026	100.0

2024 Missouri House of Representatives election, 38th District
Party	Candidate	Votes	%
Democratic	Martin Jacobs	10,344	51.28
Republican	Chris Lonsdale (incumbent)	9,829	48.72
Total votes		20,173	100.0
Democratic gain from Republican			

=== District 39 ===
39th District Republican primary details
Mark Meirath

Organizations

- Missouri Right to Life PAC

Republican Primary, 39th District
Party	Candidate	Votes	%
Republican	Mark Meirath	Unopposed	
Total votes		3,886	100.0

2024 Missouri House of Representatives election, 39th District
Party	Candidate	Votes	%
Republican	Mark Meirath	Unopposed	
Total votes		16,905	100.0

=== District 40 ===
40th District Republican primary details

Republican Primary, 40th District
Party	Candidate	Votes	%
Republican	Chad Perkins (incumbent)	Unopposed	
Total votes		5,512	100.0

40th District Libertarian primary details

Libertarian Primary, 40th District
Party	Candidate	Votes	%
Libertarian	Sheri Jay	Unopposed	
Total votes		16	100.0

2024 Missouri House of Representatives election, 40th District
Party	Candidate	Votes	%
Republican	Chad Perkins (incumbent)	14,958	83.38
Libertarian	Sheri Jay	2,981	16.62
Total votes		17,939	100.0
Republican hold			

=== District 41 ===
41st District Democratic primary details

Democratic Primary, 41st District
Party	Candidate	Votes	%
Democratic	Hans H Stock	Unopposed	
Total votes		1,022	100.0

41st District Republican primary details

Republican Primary, 41st District
Party	Candidate	Votes	%
Republican	Doyle Justus (incumbent)	Unopposed	
Total votes		5,279	100.0

41st District Libertarian primary details

Libertarian Primary, 41st District
Party	Candidate	Votes	%
Libertarian	Dalton P. Johnson	Unopposed	
Total votes		18	100.0

2024 Missouri House of Representatives election, 41st District
Party	Candidate	Votes	%
Republican	Doyle Justus (incumbent)	15,505	76.91
Democratic	Hans H Stock	4,133	20.50
Libertarian	Dalton P. Johnson	521	2.58
Total votes		20,159	100.0
Republican hold			

=== District 42 ===
42nd District Democratic primary details

Democratic Primary, 42nd District
Party	Candidate	Votes	%
Democratic	Shaun Sparks	Unopposed	
Total votes		1,198	100.0

42nd District Republican primary details
Jeff Myers

Organizations

- Missouri Right to Life PAC

Republican Primary, 42nd District
Party	Candidate	Votes	%
Republican	Jeff Myers (incumbent)	Unopposed	
Total votes		5,885	100.0

2024 Missouri House of Representatives election, 42nd District
Party	Candidate	Votes	%
Republican	Jeff Myers (incumbent)	16,261	77.40
Democratic	Shaun Sparks	4,748	22.60
Total votes		21,009	100.00
Republican hold			

=== District 43 ===
43rd District Democratic primary details

Democratic Primary, 43rd District
Party	Candidate	Votes	%
Democratic	Erik Richardson	Unopposed	
Total votes		828	100.0

43rd District Republican primary details
Kent Haden

Organizations

- Missouri Right to Life PAC

Republican Primary, 43rd District
Party	Candidate	Votes	%
Republican	Kent Haden (incumbent)	Unopposed	
Total votes		4,443	100.0

2024 Missouri House of Representatives election, 43rd District
Party	Candidate	Votes	%
Republican	Kent Haden (incumbent)	13,257	78.47
Democratic	Erik Richardson	3,637	21.53
Total votes		16,894	100.00
Republican hold			

=== District 44 ===
44th District Republican primary details
Bryce Beal

Organizations

- Missouri Right to Life PAC (co-endorsed Martin)
John Martin

Organizations

- Missouri Right to Life PAC (co-endorsed Beal)

Republican Primary, 44th District
Party	Candidate	Votes	%
Republican	John Martin	2,756	61.2
Republican	Bryce Beal	1,747	38.8
Total votes		4,503	100.00

44th District Democratic primary details

Democratic Primary, 44th District
Party	Candidate	Votes	%
Democratic	Dave Raithel	Unopposed	
Total votes		1,937	100.0

2024 Missouri House of Representatives election, 44th District
Party	Candidate	Votes	%
Republican	John Martin	12,864	64.69
Democratic	Dave Raithel	7,023	35.31
Total votes		19,887	100.00
Republican hold			

=== District 45 ===
45th District Democratic primary details

Democratic Primary, 45th District
Party	Candidate	Votes	%
Democratic	Kathy Steinhoff (incumbent)	Unopposed	
Total votes		2,077	100.0

2024 Missouri House of Representatives election, 45th District
Party	Candidate	Votes	%
Democratic	Kathy Steinhoff (incumbent)	Unopposed	
Total votes		9,559	100.0

=== District 46 ===
46th District Democratic primary details

Democratic Primary, 46th District
Party	Candidate	Votes	%
Democratic	David Tyson Smith (incumbent)	Unopposed	
Total votes		2,442	100.0

2024 Missouri House of Representatives election, 46th District
Party	Candidate	Votes	%
Democratic	David Tyson Smith (incumbent)	Unopposed	
Total votes		11,343	100.0

=== District 47 ===
47th District Democratic primary details

Democratic Primary, 47th District
Party	Candidate	Votes	%
Democratic	Adrian Plank (incumbent)	Unopposed	
Total votes		3,793	100.0

47th District Republican primary details

Republican Primary, 47th District
Party	Candidate	Votes	%
Republican	John Potter	Unopposed	
Total votes		3,126	100.0

2024 Missouri House of Representatives election, 47th District
Party	Candidate	Votes	%
Democratic	Adrian Plank (incumbent)	11,600	54.53
Republican	John Potter	9,672	45.47
Total votes		21,272	100.0
Democratic hold			

=== District 48 ===
48th District Democratic primary details

Democratic Primary, 48th District
Party	Candidate	Votes	%
Democratic	Joseph Jefferies	Unopposed	
Total votes		1,142	100.0

48th District Republican primary details
Tim Taylor

Organizations

- Missouri Right to Life PAC

Republican Primary, 48th District
Party	Candidate	Votes	%
Republican	Tim Taylor (incumbent)	Unopposed	
Total votes		5,827	100.0

2024 Missouri House of Representatives election, 48th District
Party	Candidate	Votes	%
Republican	Tim Taylor (incumbent)	14,478	77.40
Democratic	Joseph Jefferies	4,228	22.60
Total votes		18,706	100.00
Republican hold			

=== District 49 ===
49th District Democratic primary details

Democratic Primary, 49th District
Party	Candidate	Votes	%
Democratic	Jessica O'Neal-Slisz	Unopposed	
Total votes		1,190	100.0

49th District Republican primary details
Jim Schulte

Organizations

- Missouri Right to Life PAC

Republican Primary, 49th District
Party	Candidate	Votes	%
Republican	Jim Schulte (incumbent)	Unopposed	
Total votes		5,338	100.0

2024 Missouri House of Representatives election, 49th District
Party	Candidate	Votes	%
Republican	Jim Schulte (incumbent)	13,147	72.70
Democratic	Jessica O’Neal-Slisz	4,937	27.30
Total votes		18,084	100.00
Republican hold			

=== District 50 ===
Incumbent democrat Douglas Mann is retiring.

50th District Democratic primary details

Democratic Primary, 50th District
Party	Candidate	Votes	%
Democratic	Gregg Bush	1,741	60.1
Democratic	Jeffrey Kyle Basinger	1,156	39.9
Total votes		2,897	100.00

50th District Republican primary details

Republican Primary, 50th District
Party	Candidate	Votes	%
Republican	Joshua Ray Blakeman	Unopposed	
Total votes		2,388	100.0

2024 Missouri House of Representatives election, 50th District
Party	Candidate	Votes	%
Democratic	Gregg Bush	10,329	56.01
Republican	John T. Lane	8,111	43.99
Total votes		18,440	100.0
Democratic hold			

=== District 51 ===
51st District Democratic primary details

Democratic Primary, 51st District
Party	Candidate	Votes	%
Democratic	Glenda Bainbridge	Unopposed	
Total votes		1,237	100.0

51st District Republican primary details
Kerrick Alumbaugh

Organizations

- Missouri Right to Life PAC (co-endorsed Nolte)
Mark Nolte

Organizations

- Missouri Right to Life PAC (co-endorsed Alumbaugh)

Republican Primary, 51st District
Party	Candidate	Votes	%
Republican	Mark W Nolte	3,254	51.7
Republican	Kerrick Alumbaugh	3,036	48.3
Total votes		6,290	100.00

2024 Missouri House of Representatives election, 51st District
Party	Candidate	Votes	%
Republican	Mark W Nolte	12,409	73.92
Democratic	Glenda Bainbridge	4,377	26.08
Total votes		16,786	100.00
Republican hold			

=== District 52 ===
52nd District Democratic primary details

Democratic Primary, 52nd District
Party	Candidate	Votes	%
Democratic	Rene Vance	Unopposed	
Total votes		1,011	100.0

52nd District Republican primary details
Brad Pollitt

Organizations

- Missouri Right to Life PAC

Republican Primary, 52nd District
Party	Candidate	Votes	%
Republican	Brad Pollitt (incumbent)	Unopposed	
Total votes		4,093	100.0

2024 Missouri House of Representatives election, 52nd District
Party	Candidate	Votes	%
Republican	Brad Pollitt (incumbent)	11,020	74.28
Democratic	Rene Vance	3,816	25.72
Total votes		14,836	100.00
Republican hold			

=== District 53 ===
53rd District Democratic primary details

Democratic Primary, 53rd District
Party	Candidate	Votes	%
Democratic	Beth Grubb	Unopposed	
Total votes		1,307	100.0

53rd District Republican primary details
Terry Thompson

Organizations

- Missouri Right to Life PAC

Republican Primary, 53rd District
Party	Candidate	Votes	%
Republican	Terry Thompson (incumbent)	Unopposed	
Total votes		5,418	100.0

2024 Missouri House of Representatives election, 53rd District
Party	Candidate	Votes	%
Republican	Terry Thompson (incumbent)	13,550	72.89
Democratic	Beth Grubb	5,039	27.11
Total votes		18.589	100.00
Republican hold			

=== District 54 ===
54th District Democratic primary details

Democratic Primary, 54th District
Party	Candidate	Votes	%
Democratic	Eric Stevens	Unopposed	
Total votes		1,267	100.0

54th District Republican primary details
Brandon Phelps

Organizations

- Missouri Right to Life PAC (co-endorsed Sergent)
Matthew Sergent

Organizations

- Missouri Right to Life PAC (co-endorsed Phelps)

Republican Primary, 54th District
Party	Candidate	Votes	%
Republican	Brandon Phelps	2,392	51.9
Republican	Matthew Sergent	2,219	48.1
Total votes		4,611	100.00

2024 Missouri House of Representatives election, 54th District
Party	Candidate	Votes	%
Republican	Brandon Phelps	11,614	70.28
Democratic	Eric Stevens	4,911	29.72
Total votes		16,525	100.00
Republican hold			

=== District 55 ===
55th District Republican primary details
William Irwin

Organizations

- Missouri Right to Life PAC

Republican Primary, 55th District
Party	Candidate	Votes	%
Republican	William (Bill) Irwin	Unopposed	
Total votes		4,994	100.0

2024 Missouri House of Representatives election, 55th District
Party	Candidate	Votes	%
Republican	William (Bill) Irwin	Unopposed	
Total votes		17,544	100.0

=== District 56 ===
56th District Democratic primary details

Democratic Primary, 56th District
Party	Candidate	Votes	%
Democratic	Pam Jenkins Hatcher	Unopposed	
Total votes		1,716	100.0

56th District Republican primary details
Michael Davis

Organizations

- Missouri Right to Life PAC

Republican Primary, 56th District
Party	Candidate	Votes	%
Republican	Michael Davis	1,474	41.9
Republican	Todd Berck	1,071	30.4
Republican	Ryan Johnson	973	27.7
Total votes		3,518	100.00

2024 Missouri House of Representatives election, 56th District
Party	Candidate	Votes	%
Republican	Michael Davis (incumbent)	9,871	54.17
Democratic	Pam Jenkins Hatcher	8,353	45.83
Total votes		18,224	100.00
Republican hold			

=== District 57 ===
57th District Democratic primary details

Democratic Primary, 57th District
Party	Candidate	Votes	%
Democratic	Michael D. Walbom	Unopposed	
Total votes		906	100.0

57th District Republican primary details
Rodger Reedy

Organizations

- Missouri Right to Life PAC

Republican Primary, 57th District
Party	Candidate	Votes	%
Republican	Rodger Reedy (incumbent)	Unopposed	
Total votes		5,715	100.0

2024 Missouri House of Representatives election, 57th District
Party	Candidate	Votes	%
Republican	Rodger Reedy (incumbent)	15,240	81.21
Democratic	Michael D. Walbom	3,526	18.79
Total votes		18,766	100.00
Republican hold			

=== District 58 ===
58th District Republican primary details
Willard Haley

Organizations

- Missouri Right to Life PAC

Republican Primary, 58th District
Party	Candidate	Votes	%
Republican	Willard Haley (incumbent)	Unopposed	
Total votes		5,801	100.0

2024 Missouri House of Representatives election, 58th District
Party	Candidate	Votes	%
Republican	Willard Haley (incumbent)	Unopposed	
Total votes		14,689	100.0

=== District 59 ===
59th District Republican primary details

Republican Primary, 59th District
Party	Candidate	Votes	%
Republican	Rudy Veit (incumbent)	Unopposed	
Total votes		8,046	100.0

2024 Missouri House of Representatives election, 59th District
Party	Candidate	Votes	%
Republican	Rudy Veit (incumbent)	Unopposed	
Total votes		19,534	100.0

=== District 60 ===
60th District Democratic primary details

Democratic Primary, 60th District
Party	Candidate	Votes	%
Democratic	Jamie Howard	Unopposed	
Total votes		1,444	100.0

60th District Republican primary details
Dave Griffith

Organizations

- Missouri Right to Life PAC

Republican Primary, 60th District
Party	Candidate	Votes	%
Republican	Dave Griffith (incumbent)	Unopposed	
Total votes		4,890	100.0

2024 Missouri House of Representatives election, 60th District
Party	Candidate	Votes	%
Republican	Dave Griffith (incumbent)	10,412	62.56
Democratic	Jamie Howard	6,232	37.44
Total votes		16,644	100.00
Republican hold			

=== District 61 ===
61st District Republican primary details
Bruce Sassmann

Organizations

- Missouri Right to Life PAC

Republican Primary, 61st District
Party	Candidate	Votes	%
Republican	Bruce Sassmann (incumbent)	4,494	53.0
Republican	Paul Gerard Stratman	3,383	39.9
Republican	Brian L Tharp	600	7.1
Total votes		8,477	100.00

2024 Missouri House of Representatives election, 61st District
Party	Candidate	Votes	%
Republican	Bruce Sassmann (incumbent)	Unopposed	
Total votes		18,231	100.0

=== District 62 ===
62nd District Republican primary details
Sherri Gallick

Organizations

- Missouri Right to Life PAC

Republican Primary, 62nd District
Party	Candidate	Votes	%
Republican	Sherri Gallick (incumbent)	Unopposed	
Total votes		5,491	100.0

2024 Missouri House of Representatives election, 62nd District
Party	Candidate	Votes	%
Republican	Sherri Gallick (incumbent)	Unopposed	
Total votes		18,315	100.0

=== District 63 ===
63rd District Democratic primary details

Democratic Primary, 63rd District
Party	Candidate	Votes	%
Democratic	Jenna Roberson	Unopposed	
Total votes		1,213	100.0

63rd District Republican primary details

Republican Primary, 63rd District
Party	Candidate	Votes	%
Republican	Tricia Byrnes (incumbent)	Unopposed	
Total votes		3,223	100.0

2024 Missouri House of Representatives election, 63rd District
Party	Candidate	Votes	%
Republican	Tricia Byrnes (incumbent)	12,167	65.43
Democratic	Jenna Roberson	6,428	34.57
Total votes		18,595	100.00
Republican hold			

=== District 64 ===
64th District Democratic primary details

Democratic Primary, 64th District
Party	Candidate	Votes	%
Democratic	Cheryl Hibbeler	Unopposed	
Total votes		1,405	100.0

64th District Republican primary details
Tony Lovasco

Organizations

- Americans for Prosperity
- Missouri Right to Life PAC

Republican Primary, 64th District
Party	Candidate	Votes	%
Republican	Deanna Self	2,856	59.6
Republican	Tony Lovasco (incumbent)	1,939	40.4
Total votes		4,795	100.00

2024 Missouri House of Representatives election, 64th District
Party	Candidate	Votes	%
Republican	Deanna Self	16,576	99.73
Write-In	Arnie C. AC (Arn) Dienoff	45	0.27
Total votes		16,621	100.0
Republican hold			

=== District 65 ===
65th District Republican primary details
Wendy Hausman

Organizations

- Missouri Right to Life PAC

Republican Primary, 65th District
Party	Candidate	Votes	%
Republican	Wendy Hausman (incumbent)	Unopposed	
Total votes		3,458	100.0

2024 Missouri House of Representatives election, 65th District
Party	Candidate	Votes	%
Republican	Wendy Hausman (incumbent)	Unopposed	
Total votes		14,540	100.0

=== District 66 ===
66th District Democratic primary details

Democratic Primary, 66th District
Party	Candidate	Votes	%
Democratic	Marlene Terry (incumbent)	2,816	64.4
Democratic	Tommie Pierson Sr.	1,555	35.6
Total votes		4,371	100.00

2024 Missouri House of Representatives election, 66th District
Party	Candidate	Votes	%
Democratic	Marlene Terry (incumbent)	Unopposed	
Total votes		9,747	100.0

=== District 67 ===
67th District Democratic primary details

Democratic Primary, 67th District
Party	Candidate	Votes	%
Democratic	Tonya Rush	5,520	65.0
Democratic	Neil Smith	2,969	35.0
Total votes		8,489	100.00

2024 Missouri House of Representatives election, 67th District
Party	Candidate	Votes	%
Democratic	Tonya Rush	Unopposed	
Total votes		16,559	100.0

=== District 68 ===
68th District Democratic primary details

Democratic Primary, 68th District
Party	Candidate	Votes	%
Democratic	Kem Smith	2,484	47.1
Democratic	Janay Mosley	2,259	42.8
Democratic	Pamela Paul	530	10.1
Total votes		5,273	100.00

2024 Missouri House of Representatives election, 68th District
Party	Candidate	Votes	%
Democratic	Kem Smith	Unopposed	
Total votes		12,589	100.0

=== District 69 ===
69th District Democratic primary details

Democratic Primary, 69th District
Party	Candidate	Votes	%
Democratic	Chris Chapman	Unopposed	
Total votes		2,011	100.0

69th District Republican primary details
Scott Miller

Organizations

- Missouri Right to Life PAC

Republican Primary, 69th District
Party	Candidate	Votes	%
Republican	Scott Miller	Unopposed	
Total votes		4,019	100.0

2024 Missouri House of Representatives election, 69th District
Party	Candidate	Votes	%
Republican	Scott A. Miler	12,262	57.74
Democratic	Chris Chapman	8,974	42.26
Total votes		21,236	100.00
Republican hold			

=== District 70 ===
70th District Democratic primary details

Democratic Primary, 70th District
Party	Candidate	Votes	%
Democratic	Stephanie Boykin	3,061	73.0
Democratic	Rickey Joiner	624	14.9
Democratic	Durell Reeves	509	12.1
Total votes		4,194	100.00

70th District Libertarian primary details

Libertarian Primary, 70th District
Party	Candidate	Votes	%
Libertarian	Dustin Coffell	Unopposed	
Total votes		13	100.0

2024 Missouri House of Representatives election, 70th District
Party	Candidate	Votes	%
Democratic	Stephanie Boykin	11,008	79.13
Libertarian	Dustin Coffell	2,904	20.87
Total votes		13,912	100.0
Democratic hold			

=== District 71 ===
71st District Democratic primary details

Democratic Primary, 71st District
Party	Candidate	Votes	%
Democratic	LaDonna Appelbaum (incumbent)	Unopposed	
Total votes		5,349	100.0

2024 Missouri House of Representatives election, 71st District
Party	Candidate	Votes	%
Democratic	LaDonna Appelbaum (incumbent)	Unopposed	
Total votes		15,265	100.0

=== District 72 ===
72nd District Democratic primary details

Democratic Primary, 72nd District
Party	Candidate	Votes	%
Democratic	Doug Clemens (incumbent)	Unopposed	
Total votes		3,315	100.0

2024 Missouri House of Representatives election, 72nd District
Party	Candidate	Votes	%
Democratic	Doug Clemens (incumbent)	Unopposed	
Total votes		10,787	100.0

=== District 73 ===
73rd District Democratic primary details

Democratic Primary, 73rd District
Party	Candidate	Votes	%
Democratic	Raychel Proudie (incumbent)	3,006	66.4
Democratic	Mike Person	1,520	33.6
Total votes		4,526	100.00

2024 Missouri House of Representatives election, 73rd District
Party	Candidate	Votes	%
Democratic	Raychel Proudie (incumbent)	Unopposed	
Total votes		10,482	100.0

=== District 74 ===
74th District Democratic primary details

Democratic Primary, 74th District
Party	Candidate	Votes	%
Democratic	Kevin Windham Jr. (incumbent)	Unopposed	
Total votes		4,467	100.0

74th District Republican primary details
Jack Howard

Organizations

- Missouri Right to Life PAC

Republican Primary, 74th District
Party	Candidate	Votes	%
Republican	Jack Howard	Unopposed	
Total votes		469	100.0

2024 Missouri House of Representatives election, 74th District
Party	Candidate	Votes	%
Democratic	Marla Smith	10,195	83.61
Republican	Jack Howard	1,999	16.39
Total votes		12,194	100.0
Democratic hold			

=== District 75 ===
75th District Democratic primary details

Democratic Primary, 75th District
Party	Candidate	Votes	%
Democratic	Chanel Mosley	2,369	44.1
Democratic	Catina Howard	2,331	43.4
Democratic	A.J. White	672	12.5
Total votes		5,372	100.00

2024 Missouri House of Representatives election, 75th District
Party	Candidate	Votes	%
Democratic	Chanel Mosley	Unopposed	
Total votes		12,772	100.0

=== District 76 ===
76th District Democratic primary details

Democratic Primary, 76th District
Party	Candidate	Votes	%
Democratic	Marlon Anderson (incumbent)	Unopposed	
Total votes		4,854	100.0

76th District Libertarian primary details

Libertarian Primary, 76th District
Party	Candidate	Votes	%
Libertarian	Cameron McCarty	Unopposed	
Total votes		10	100.0

2024 Missouri House of Representatives election, 76th District
Party	Candidate	Votes	%
Democratic	Marlon Anderson (incumbent)	10,927	90.50
Libertarian	Cameron McCarty	1,147	9.50
Total votes		12,074	100.0
Democratic hold			

=== District 77 ===
77th District Democratic primary details

Democratic Primary, 77th District
Party	Candidate	Votes	%
Democratic	Kimberly-Ann Collins (incumbent)	Unopposed	
Total votes		5,330	100.0

2024 Missouri House of Representatives election, 77th District
Party	Candidate	Votes	%
Democratic	Kimberly-Ann Collins (incumbent)	Unopposed	
Total votes		12,327	100.0

=== District 78 ===
78th District Democratic primary details

Democratic Primary, 78th District
Party	Candidate	Votes	%
Democratic	Marty (Joe) Murray	2,570	57.4
Democratic	Jami Cox Antwi	1,409	31.5
Democratic	Jessica Pachak	497	11.1
Total votes		4,476	100.00

78th District Republican primary details
Jim Povolish

Organizations

- Missouri Right to Life PAC

Republican Primary, 78th District
Party	Candidate	Votes	%
Republican	Jim Povolish	Unopposed	
Total votes		169	100.0

2024 Missouri House of Representatives election, 78th District
Party	Candidate	Votes	%
Democratic	Marty (Joe) Murray	9,788	88.44
Republican	Jim Povolish	1,280	11.56
Total votes		11,068	100.0
Democratic hold			

=== District 79 ===
79th District Democratic primary details

Democratic Primary, 79th District
Party	Candidate	Votes	%
Democratic	LaKeySha Frazier-Bosley (incumbent)	Unopposed	
Total votes		4,808	100.0

2024 Missouri House of Representatives election, 79th District
Party	Candidate	Votes	%
Democratic	LaKeySha Frazier-Bosley (incumbent)	Unopposed	
Total votes		10,867	100.0

=== District 80 ===
80th District Democratic primary details

Democratic Primary, 80th District
Party	Candidate	Votes	%
Democratic	Elizabeth (Lilly) Fuchs	3,659	59.4
Democratic	Ben Murray	2,504	40.6
Total votes		6,617	100.00

80th District Republican primary details
Kirk Hilzinger

Organizations

- Missouri Right to Life PAC

Republican Primary, 80th District
Party	Candidate	Votes	%
Republican	Kirk Hilzinger	Unopposed	
Total votes		454	100.0

2024 Missouri House of Representatives election, 80th District
Party	Candidate	Votes	%
Democratic	Elizabeth (Lilly) Fuchs	12,115	84.18
Republican	Kirk Hilzinger	2,277	15.82
Total votes		14,392	100.0
Democratic hold			

=== District 81 ===
81st District Democratic primary details

Democratic Primary, 81st District
Party	Candidate	Votes	%
Democratic	Steve Butz (incumbent)	2,929	58.5
Democratic	Bill Stephens	1,595	31.9
Democratic	Cydney E. Johnson Sr.	480	9.6
Total votes		5,004	100.00

81st District Republican primary details

Republican Primary, 81st District
Party	Candidate	Votes	%
Republican	Jake Koehr	Unopposed	
Total votes		752	100.0

2024 Missouri House of Representatives election, 81st District
Party	Candidate	Votes	%
Democratic	Steve Butz (incumbent)	10,407	78.08
Republican	Jake Koehr	2,921	21.92
Total votes		13,328	100.0
Democratic hold			

=== District 82 ===
82nd District Democratic primary details

Democratic Primary, 82nd District
Party	Candidate	Votes	%
Democratic	Nick Kimble	Unopposed	
Total votes		7,134	100.0

82nd District Republican primary details

Republican Primary, 82nd District
Party	Candidate	Votes	%
Republican	Donald Flecke	Unopposed	
Total votes		1,460	100.0

2024 Missouri House of Representatives election, 82nd District
Party	Candidate	Votes	%
Democratic	Nick Kimble	16,013	73.96
Republican	Donald W. Flecke	5,639	26.04
Total votes		21,652	100.0
Democratic hold			

=== District 83 ===
83rd District Democratic primary details

Democratic Primary, 83rd District
Party	Candidate	Votes	%
Democratic	Ray Reed	Unopposed	
Total votes		4,596	100.0

83rd District Libertarian primary details

Libertarian Primary, 83rd District
Party	Candidate	Votes	%
Libertarian	Andrew Bolin	Unopposed	
Total votes		23	100.0

2024 Missouri House of Representatives election, 83rd District
Party	Candidate	Votes	%
Democratic	Ray Reed	14,337	76.93
Libertarian	Andrew Bolin	3,704	19.87
Green	James Annala	596	3.20
Total votes		18,637	100.0
Democratic hold			

=== District 84 ===
84th District Democratic primary details

Democratic Primary, 84th District
Party	Candidate	Votes	%
Democratic	Del Taylor (incumbent)	Unopposed	
Total votes		4,926	100.0

84th District Republican primary details

Republican Primary, 84th District
Party	Candidate	Votes	%
Republican	Richard (Ricky) Cowell	Unopposed	
Total votes		303	100.0

2024 Missouri House of Representatives election, 84th District
Party	Candidate	Votes	%
Democratic	Del Taylor (incumbent)	11,470	87.91
Republican	Richard (Ricky) Cowell	1,577	12.09
Total votes		13,047	100.0
Democratic hold			

=== District 85 ===
85th District Democratic primary details

Democratic Primary, 85th District
Party	Candidate	Votes	%
Democratic	Yolonda Fountain Henderson (incumbent)	Unopposed	
Total votes		4,806	100.0

2024 Missouri House of Representatives election, 85th District
Party	Candidate	Votes	%
Democratic	Yolonda Fountain Henderson (incumbent)	Unopposed	
Total votes		10,977	100.0

=== District 86 ===
86th District Democratic primary details

Democratic Primary, 86th District
Party	Candidate	Votes	%
Democratic	Jeff Hales	4,253	54.1
Democratic	Donovan Meeks	2,159	27.5
Democratic	Trina Nelson	1,444	18.4
Total votes		7,856	100.00

2024 Missouri House of Representatives election, 86th District
Party	Candidate	Votes	%
Democratic	Jeff Hales (incumbent)	Unopposed	
Total votes		15,612	100.0

=== District 87 ===
87th District Democratic primary details

Democratic Primary, 87th District
Party	Candidate	Votes	%
Democratic	Connie Steinmetz	Unopposed	
Total votes		3,434	100.0

87th District Republican primary details
Daniel Hyatt

Organizations

- Missouri Right to Life PAC (co-endorsed Rommel)
John Rommel

Organizations

- Missouri Right to Life PAC (co-endorsed Hyatt)

Republican Primary, 87th District
Party	Candidate	Votes	%
Republican	John Rommel	1,258	65.6
Republican	Daniel Hyatt	659	34.4
Total votes		1,917	100.00

2024 Missouri House of Representatives election, 87th District
Party	Candidate	Votes	%
Democratic	Connie Steinmetz	10,267	61.88
Republican	John Rommel	6,324	38.12
Total votes		16,591	100.0
Democratic hold			

=== District 88 ===
88th District Democratic primary details

Democratic Primary, 88th District
Party	Candidate	Votes	%
Democratic	Kyle Luzynski	Unopposed	
Total votes		2,165	100.0

88th District Republican primary details

Republican Primary, 88th District
Party	Candidate	Votes	%
Republican	Holly Jones (incumbent)	Unopposed	
Total votes		3,880	100.0

2024 Missouri House of Representatives election, 88th District
Party	Candidate	Votes	%
Republican	Holly Jones (incumbent)	12,960	59.91
Democratic	John Kiehne	8,674	40.09
Total votes		21,634	100.00
Republican hold			

=== District 89 ===
89th District Democratic primary details

Democratic Primary, 89th District
Party	Candidate	Votes	%
Democratic	Eric Morse	Unopposed	
Total votes		2,696	100.0

89th District Republican primary details

Republican Primary, 89th District
Party	Candidate	Votes	%
Republican	George Hruza	Unopposed	
Total votes		4,093	100.0

2024 Missouri House of Representatives election, 89th District
Party	Candidate	Votes	%
Republican	George Hruza	12,711	57.30
Democratic	Eric Morse	9,471	42.70
Total votes		22,182	100.00
Republican hold			

=== District 90 ===
90th District Democratic primary details

Democratic Primary, 90th District
Party	Candidate	Votes	%
Democratic	Mark Boyko	Unopposed	
Total votes		4,223	100.0

90th District Republican primary details

Republican Primary, 90th District
Party	Candidate	Votes	%
Republican	Scott Mathewson	Unopposed	
Total votes		2,588	100.0

2024 Missouri House of Representatives election, 90th District
Party	Candidate	Votes	%
Democratic	Mark Boyko	13,670	60.64
Republican	Scott Mathewson	8,874	39.36
Total votes		22,544	100.0
Democratic hold			

=== District 91 ===
91st District Democratic primary details

Democratic Primary, 91st District
Party	Candidate	Votes	%
Democratic	Jo Doll (incumbent)	Unopposed	
Total votes		5,949	100.0

2024 Missouri House of Representatives election, 91st District
Party	Candidate	Votes	%
Democratic	Jo Doll (incumbent)	Unopposed	
Total votes		16,872	100.0

=== District 92 ===
92nd District Democratic primary details

Democratic Primary, 92nd District
Party	Candidate	Votes	%
Democratic	Michael Burton (incumbent)	Unopposed	
Total votes		2,904	100.0

92nd District Republican primary details
Kenneth Abram

Organizations

- Missouri Right to Life PAC (co-endorsed Mathews)
Cijo Mathews

Organizations

- Missouri Right to Life PAC (co-endorsed Abram)

Republican Primary, 92nd District
Party	Candidate	Votes	%
Republican	Kenneth Abram	2,199	76.2
Republican	Cijo Mathews	688	23.8
Total votes		2,887	100.00

2024 Missouri House of Representatives election, 92nd District
Party	Candidate	Votes	%
Democratic	Michael Burton (incumbent)	10,244	54.29
Republican	Kenneth Abram	8,626	45.71
Total votes		18,870	100.0
Democratic hold			

=== District 93 ===
93rd District Democratic primary details

Democratic Primary, 93rd District
Party	Candidate	Votes	%
Democratic	Bridget Walsh Moore (incumbent)	Unopposed	
Total votes		1,984	100.0

93rd District Libertarian primary details

Libertarian Primary, 93rd District
Party	Candidate	Votes	%
Libertarian	James O'Donnell	Unopposed	
Total votes		11	100.0

2024 Missouri House of Representatives election, 93rd District
Party	Candidate	Votes	%
Democratic	Bridget Walsh Moore (incumbent)	8,416	68.82
Libertarian	James O'Donnell	3,813	31.18
Total votes		12,229	100.0
Democratic hold			

=== District 94 ===
94th District Democratic primary details

Democratic Primary, 94th District
Party	Candidate	Votes	%
Democratic	Kyle W. Kerns	Unopposed	
Total votes		2,409	100.0

94th District Republican primary details

Republican Primary, 94th District
Party	Candidate	Votes	%
Republican	Jim Murphy (incumbent)	Unopposed	
Total votes		3,426	100.0

2024 Missouri House of Representatives election, 94th District
Party	Candidate	Votes	%
Republican	Jim Murphy (incumbent)	10,457	56.34
Democratic	Kyle W. Kerns	8,103	43.66
Total votes		18,560	100.00
Republican hold			

=== District 95 ===
95th District Democratic primary details

Democratic Primary, 95th District
Party	Candidate	Votes	%
Democratic	Deb Langland	Unopposed	
Total votes		2,522	100.0

95th District Republican primary details

Republican Primary, 95th District
Party	Candidate	Votes	%
Republican	Michael O'Donnell (incumbent)	Unopposed	
Total votes		4,339	100.0

2024 Missouri House of Representatives election, 95th District
Party	Candidate	Votes	%
Republican	Michael O'Donnell (incumbent)	13,311	61.52
Democratic	Deb Langland	8,327	38.48
Total votes		21,638	100.00
Republican hold			

=== District 96 ===
96th District Democratic primary details

Democratic Primary, 96th District
Party	Candidate	Votes	%
Democratic	Leslie Derrington	Unopposed	
Total votes		3,497	100.0

96th District Republican primary details

Republican Primary, 96th District
Party	Candidate	Votes	%
Republican	Brad Christ (incumbent)	Unopposed	
Total votes		3,809	100.0

2024 Missouri House of Representatives election, 96th District
Party	Candidate	Votes	%
Republican	Brad Christ (incumbent)	12,297	55.23
Democratic	Leslie Derrington	9.967	44.77
Total votes		22,264	100.00
Republican hold			

=== District 97 ===
97th District Democratic primary details

Democratic Primary, 97th District
Party	Candidate	Votes	%
Democratic	Dan Schaefer	Unopposed	
Total votes		1,576	100.0

97th District Republican primary details
David Casteel

Organizations

- Missouri Right to Life PAC

Republican Primary, 97th District
Party	Candidate	Votes	%
Republican	David Casteel (incumbent)	Unopposed	
Total votes		3,248	100.0

2024 Missouri House of Representatives election, 97th District
Party	Candidate	Votes	%
Republican	David Casteel (incumbent)	11,459	64.49
Democratic	Dan Schaefer	6,309	35.51
Total votes		17,768	100.00
Republican hold			

=== District 98 ===
98th District Democratic primary details

Democratic Primary, 98th District
Party	Candidate	Votes	%
Democratic	Jaclyn Zimmermann	Unopposed	
Total votes		2,964	100.0

98th District Republican primary details

Republican Primary, 98th District
Party	Candidate	Votes	%
Republican	Carol Veillette	Unopposed	
Total votes		3,136	100.0

2024 Missouri House of Representatives election, 98th District
Party	Candidate	Votes	%
Democratic	Jaclyn Zimmerman	10,758	52.30
Republican	Carol Veillette	9,813	47.70
Total votes		20,571	100.0
Democratic hold			

=== District 99 ===
99th District Democratic primary details

Democratic Primary, 99th District
Party	Candidate	Votes	%
Democratic	Ian Mackey (incumbent)	4,362	80.6
Democratic	Boris Abadzhyan	1,051	19.4
Total votes		5,413	100.00

2024 Missouri House of Representatives election, 99th District
Party	Candidate	Votes	%
Democratic	Ian Mackey (incumbent)	Unopposed	
Total votes		14,356	100.0

=== District 100 ===
100th District Democratic primary details

Democratic Primary, 100th District
Party	Candidate	Votes	%
Democratic	Colin Lovett	Unopposed	
Total votes		2,852	100.0

100th District Republican primary details
Philip Oehlerking

Organizations

- Missouri Right to Life PAC

Republican Primary, 100th District
Party	Candidate	Votes	%
Republican	Philip Oehlerking (incumbent)	3,171	78.9
Republican	Jason Jennings	441	11.0
Republican	Brant Harber	405	10.1
Total votes		4,017	100.00

2024 Missouri House of Representatives election, 100th District
Party	Candidate	Votes	%
Republican	Philip Oehlerking (incumbent)	10,954	50.33
Democratic	Colin Lovett	10,811	49.67
Total votes		21,765	100.00
Republican hold			

=== District 101 ===
101st District Democratic primary details

Democratic Primary, 101st District
Party	Candidate	Votes	%
Democratic	Jacqueline Cotton	Unopposed	
Total votes		3,039	100.0

101st District Republican primary details
Ben Keathley

Organizations

- Missouri Right to Life PAC

Republican Primary, 101st District
Party	Candidate	Votes	%
Republican	Ben Keathley (incumbent)	Unopposed	
Total votes		4,201	100.0

2024 Missouri House of Representatives election, 101st District
Party	Candidate	Votes	%
Republican	Ben Keathley (incumbent)	12,246	54.56
Democratic	Jacqueline Cotton	10,198	45.44
Total votes		22,444	100.00
Republican hold			

=== District 102 ===
102nd District Democratic primary details

Democratic Primary, 102nd District
Party	Candidate	Votes	%
Democratic	Alex Hissong	Unopposed	
Total votes		1,669	100.0

102nd District Republican primary details
Richard West

Organizations

- Missouri Right to Life PAC

Republican Primary, 102nd District
Party	Candidate	Votes	%
Republican	Richard West (incumbent)	Unopposed	
Total votes		4,726	100.0

2024 Missouri House of Representatives election, 102nd District
Party	Candidate	Votes	%
Republican	Richard West (incumbent)	14,344	64.56
Democratic	Alex Hissong	7,873	35.44
Total votes		22,217	100.00
Republican hold			

=== District 103 ===
103rd District Democratic primary details

Democratic Primary, 103rd District
Party	Candidate	Votes	%
Democratic	Amanda Taylor	1,007	53.8
Democratic	Lizz Callahan	778	41.6
Democratic	Angelica Earl	87	4.5
Total votes		4,817	100.00

103rd District Republican primary details
Dave Hinman

Organizations

- Missouri Right to Life PAC

Republican Primary, 103rd District
Party	Candidate	Votes	%
Republican	Dave Hinman (incumbent)	Unopposed	
Total votes		2,945	100.0

2024 Missouri House of Representatives election, 103rd District
Party	Candidate	Votes	%
Republican	Dave Hinman (incumbent)	10,286	56.95
Democratic	Amanda Taylor	7,776	43.05
Total votes		18,062	100.00
Republican hold			

=== District 104 ===
104th District Democratic primary details

Democratic Primary, 104th District
Party	Candidate	Votes	%
Democratic	Tara Murray	Unopposed	
Total votes		2,329	100.0

104th District Republican primary details
Jeremy Lloyd

Organizations

- Missouri Right to Life PAC (co-endorsed Violet)
Terri Violet

Organizations

- Missouri Right to Life PAC (co-endorsed Lloyd)

Republican Primary, 104th District
Party	Candidate	Votes	%
Republican	Terri Violet	2,697	67.8
Republican	Jeremy J. Lloyd	1,281	32.2
Total votes		3,978	100.00

2024 Missouri House of Representatives election, 104th District
Party	Candidate	Votes	%
Republican	Terri Violet	10,929	54.91
Democratic	Tara Murray	8,974	45.09
Total votes		19,903	100.00
Republican hold			

=== District 105 ===
105th District Democratic primary details

Democratic Primary, 105th District
Party	Candidate	Votes	%
Democratic	Ron Odenthal	Unopposed	
Total votes		1,534	100.0

105th District Republican primary details

Republican Primary, 105th District
Party	Candidate	Votes	%
Republican	Colin Wellenkamp	Unopposed	
Total votes		2,068	100.0

2024 Missouri House of Representatives election, 105th District
Party	Candidate	Votes	%
Republican	Colin Wellenkamp	8,178	52.91
Democratic	Ron Odenthal	7,280	47.09
Total votes		15,458	100.00
Republican hold			

=== District 106 ===
106th District Democratic primary details

Democratic Primary, 106th District
Party	Candidate	Votes	%
Democratic	Karen Edge	Unopposed	
Total votes		2,418	100.0

106th District Republican primary details
Travis Wilson

Organizations

- Missouri Right to Life PAC

Republican Primary, 106th District
Party	Candidate	Votes	%
Republican	Travis Wilson (incumbent)	Unopposed	
Total votes		3,499	100.0

2024 Missouri House of Representatives election, 106th District
Party	Candidate	Votes	%
Republican	Travis Wilson (incumbent)	11,236	55.28
Democratic	Karen Edge	9,091	44.72
Total votes		20,327	100.00
Republican hold			

=== District 107 ===
107th District Democratic primary details

Democratic Primary, 107th District
Party	Candidate	Votes	%
Democratic	Gary Wester	Unopposed	
Total votes		1,411	100.0

107th District Republican primary details
Mark Matthiesen

Organizations

- Missouri Right to Life PAC

Republican Primary, 107th District
Party	Candidate	Votes	%
Republican	Mark Matthiesen (incumbent)	Unopposed	
Total votes		3,115	100.0

2024 Missouri House of Representatives election, 107th District
Party	Candidate	Votes	%
Republican	Mark Matthiesen (incumbent)	11,930	60.50
Democratic	Gary Wester	7,789	39.50
Total votes		19,719	100.00
Republican hold			

=== District 108 ===
Incumbent Justin Hicks will not seek re-election.

108th District Democratic primary details

Democratic Primary, 108th District
Party	Candidate	Votes	%
Democratic	Susan Shumway	Unopposed	
Total votes		1,452	100.0

108th District Republican primary details
Max Calfo

Organizations

- Missouri Right to Life PAC (co-endorsed Costlow)
Mike Costlow

Organizations

- Missouri Right to Life PAC (co-endorsed Calfo)

Republican Primary, 108th District
Party	Candidate	Votes	%
Republican	Mike Costlow	2,511	60.0
Republican	Max Calfo	1,676	40.0
Total votes		4,187	100.00

2024 Missouri House of Representatives election, 108th District
Party	Candidate	Votes	%
Republican	Mike Costlow	13,059	62.77
Democratic	Susan Shumway	7,434	35.74
Green	Patrick Andrew Miller	311	1.50
Total votes		20,804	100.0
Republican hold			

=== District 109 ===
109th District Democratic primary details

Democratic Primary, 109th District
Party	Candidate	Votes	%
Democratic	Eleanor Maynard	Unopposed	
Total votes		1,310	100.0

109th District Republican primary details
John Simmons

Organizations

- Americans for Prosperity

Republican Primary, 109th District
Party	Candidate	Votes	%
Republican	John Simmons	4,365	56.6
Republican	Kyle Marquart (incumbent)	3,341	43.4
Total votes		7,706	100.00

2024 Missouri House of Representatives election, 109th District
Party	Candidate	Votes	%
Republican	John Simmons	16,043	72.24
Democratic	Eleanor Maynard	6,165	27.76
Total votes		22,208	100.00
Republican hold			

=== District 110 ===
110th District Democratic primary details

Democratic Primary, 110th District
Party	Candidate	Votes	%
Democratic	Josh Thackston	Unopposed	
Total votes		2,080	100.0

110th District Republican primary details
Justin Sparks

Organizations

- Missouri Right to Life PAC

Republican Primary, 110th District
Party	Candidate	Votes	%
Republican	Justin Sparks (incumbent)	4,124	75.2
Republican	Scott Ottenberg	1,363	24.8
Total votes		5,487	100.00

2024 Missouri House of Representatives election, 110th District
Party	Candidate	Votes	%
Republican	Justin Sparks (incumbent)	14,683	62.67
Democratic	Josh Thackston	8,747	37.33
Total votes		23,430	100.00
Republican hold			

=== District 111 ===
111th District Republican primary details

Republican Primary, 111th District
Party	Candidate	Votes	%
Republican	Cecelie Williams	3,089	59.2
Republican	Gary Bonacker (incumbent)	2,125	40.8
Total votes		5,214	100.00

2024 Missouri House of Representatives election, 111th District
Party	Candidate	Votes	%
Republican	Cecile Williams	Unopposed	
Total votes		16,096	100.0

=== District 112 ===
112th District Democratic primary details

Democratic Primary, 112th District
Party	Candidate	Votes	%
Democratic	Dave Rekosh	Unopposed	
Total votes		1,473	100.0

112th District Republican primary details

Republican Primary, 112th District
Party	Candidate	Votes	%
Republican	Renee Reuter (incumbent)	Unopposed	
Total votes		3,902	100.0

2024 Missouri House of Representatives election, 112th District
Party	Candidate	Votes	%
Republican	Renee Reuter (incumbent)	13,697	69.30
Democratic	Dave Rekosh	6,068	30.70
Total votes		19,765	100.00
Republican hold			

=== District 113 ===
113th District Republican primary details
Phil Amato

Organizations

- Missouri Right to Life PAC

Republican Primary, 113th District
Party	Candidate	Votes	%
Republican	Phil Amato (incumbent)	2,488	59.0
Republican	Joe Maddock	1,727	41.0
Total votes		4,215	100.00

2024 Missouri House of Representatives election, 113th District
Party	Candidate	Votes	%
Republican	Phil Amato (incumbent)	Unopposed	
Total votes		15,099	100.0

=== District 114 ===
114th District Democratic primary details

Democratic Primary, 114th District
Party	Candidate	Votes	%
Democratic	Jessie Shepherd	Unopposed	
Total votes		1,502	100.0

114th District Republican primary details
Ken Waller

Organizations

- Missouri Right to Life PAC

Republican Primary, 114th District
Party	Candidate	Votes	%
Republican	Ken Waller (incumbent)	Unopposed	
Total votes		3,853	100.0

2024 Missouri House of Representatives election, 114th District
Party	Candidate	Votes	%
Republican	Ken Waller (incumbent)	13,374	69.98
Democratic	Jessie Shepherd	5,738	30.02
Total votes		19,112	100.00
Republican hold			

=== District 115 ===
115th District Democratic primary details

Democratic Primary, 115th District
Party	Candidate	Votes	%
Democratic	David George	Unopposed	
Total votes		1,432	100.0

115th District Republican primary details
Dominic (Dom) Lawson

Organizations

- Missouri Right to Life PAC (co-endorsed Lucas)
Bill Lucas

Organizations

- Missouri Right to Life PAC (co-endorsed Lawson)

Republican Primary, 115th District
Party	Candidate	Votes	%
Republican	Bill Lucas	3,104	63.5
Republican	Dominic (Dom) Lawson	1,783	36.5
Total votes		4,887	100.00

2024 Missouri House of Representatives election, 115th District
Party	Candidate	Votes	%
Republican	Bill Lucas	13,736	73.89
Democratic	David George	4,853	26.11
Total votes		18,589	100.00
Republican hold			

=== District 116 ===
116th District Republican primary details
Dale Wright

Organizations

- Missouri Right to Life PAC

Republican Primary, 116th District
Party	Candidate	Votes	%
Republican	Dale Wright (incumbent)	3,948	73.5
Republican	Ryan Cooper	1,424	26.5
Total votes		5,372	100.00

116th District Libertarian primary details

Libertarian Primary, 116th District
Party	Candidate	Votes	%
Libertarian	Ethan Jones	Unopposed	
Total votes		24	100.0

Ethan Jones is an American politician from Farmington Missouri. He advocates for the homeless and is a member of the Missouri Constitution Party.

2024 Missouri House of Representatives election, 116th District
Party	Candidate	Votes	%
Republican	Dale Wright (incumbent)	12,847	83.43
Libertarian	Ethan Jones	2,552	16.57
Total votes		15,399	100.0
Republican hold			

=== District 117 ===
117th District Democratic primary details

Democratic Primary, 117th District
Party	Candidate	Votes	%
Democratic	Casey Cassidy	Unopposed	
Total votes		805	100.0

117th District Republican primary details
Chad Brown

Organizations

- Missouri Right to Life PAC (co-endorsed Laubinger and Miller)
Becky Laubinger

Organizations

- Missouri Right to Life PAC (co-endorsed Brown and Miller)
Mike Miller

Organizations

- Missouri Right to Life PAC (co-endorsed Brown and Laubinger)

Republican Primary, 117th District
Party	Candidate	Votes	%
Republican	Becky Laubinger	2,419	45.8
Republican	Mike Miller	2,017	38.2
Republican	Chad Brown Sr.	847	16.0
Total votes		5,283	100.00

2024 Missouri House of Representatives election, 117th District
Party	Candidate	Votes	%
Republican	Becky Laubinger	11,965	75.95
Democratic	Casey Cassidy	3,788	24.05
Total votes		15,753	100.00
Republican hold			

=== District 118 ===
118th District Republican primary details
Mike McGirl

Organizations

- Missouri Right to Life PAC

Republican Primary, 118th District
Party	Candidate	Votes	%
Republican	Mike McGirl (incumbent)	Unopposed	
Total votes		4,747	100.0

2024 Missouri House of Representatives election, 118th District
Party	Candidate	Votes	%
Republican	Mike McGirl (incumbent)	Unopposed	
Total votes		15,791	100.0

=== District 119 ===
119th District Democratic primary details

Democratic Primary, 119th District
Party	Candidate	Votes	%
Democratic	Amy Thompson	Unopposed	
Total votes		1,221	100.0

119th District Republican primary details
Brad Banderman

Organizations

- Missouri Right to Life PAC

Republican Primary, 119th District
Party	Candidate	Votes	%
Republican	Brad Banderman (incumbent)	3,157	73.0
Republican	Rafael Madrigal	1,166	27.0
Total votes		4,323	100.00

2024 Missouri House of Representatives election, 119th District
Party	Candidate	Votes	%
Republican	Brad Banderman (incumbent)	12,751	71.93
Democratic	Amy Thompson	4,976	28.07
Total votes		17,727	100.00
Republican hold			

=== District 120 ===
120th District Democratic primary details

Democratic Primary, 120th District
Party	Candidate	Votes	%
Democratic	Jen Tracy	Unopposed	
Total votes		735	100.0

120th District Republican primary details
Lancer Blair

Organizations

- Missouri Right to Life PAC (co-endorsed Hewkin)
John Hewkin

Organizations

- Missouri Right to Life PAC (co-endorsed Blair)

Republican Primary, 120th District
Party	Candidate	Votes	%
Republican	John W. Hewkin	4,800	72.9
Republican	Lancer Blair	1,787	27.1
Total votes		6,587	100.00

2024 Missouri House of Representatives election, 120th District
Party	Candidate	Votes	%
Republican	John W. Hewkin	13,989	80.05
Democratic	Jen Tracy	3,487	19.95
Total votes		17,476	100.00
Republican hold			

=== District 121 ===
121st District Democratic primary details

Democratic Primary, 121st District
Party	Candidate	Votes	%
Democratic	Brandon Swartz	Unopposed	
Total votes		402	100.0

121st District Republican primary details
Bill Hardwick

Organizations

- Missouri Right to Life PAC

Republican Primary, 121st District
Party	Candidate	Votes	%
Republican	Bill Hardwick (incumbent)	Unopposed	
Total votes		1,799	100.0

2024 Missouri House of Representatives election, 121st District
Party	Candidate	Votes	%
Republican	Bill Hardwick (incumbent)	5,601	71.53
Democratic	Brandon Swartz	2,229	28.47
Total votes		7,830	100.00
Republican hold			

=== District 122 ===
122nd District Democratic primary details

Democratic Primary, 122nd District
Party	Candidate	Votes	%
Democratic	Tara Anura	Unopposed	
Total votes		996	100.0

122nd District Republican primary details

Republican Primary, 122nd District
Party	Candidate	Votes	%
Republican	Tara Peters (incumbent)	Unopposed	
Total votes		4,047	100.0

2024 Missouri House of Representatives election, 122nd District
Party	Candidate	Votes	%
Republican	Tara Peters (incumbent)	11,524	73.11
Democratic	Tara Anura	4,238	26.89
Total votes		15,762	100.00
Republican hold			

=== District 123 ===
123rd District Democratic primary details

Democratic Primary, 123rd District
Party	Candidate	Votes	%
Democratic	Nancy Bates	Unopposed	
Total votes		1,121	100.0

123rd District Republican primary details
Lisa Thomas

Organizations

- Americans for Prosperity

Republican Primary, 123rd District
Party	Candidate	Votes	%
Republican	Jeff Vernetti	4,582	59.4
Republican	Lisa Thomas (incumbent)	3,132	40.6
Total votes		7,714	100.00

2024 Missouri House of Representatives election, 123rd District
Party	Candidate	Votes	%
Republican	Jeff Vernetti	17,208	76.58
Democratic	Nancy Bates	5,262	23.42
Total votes		22,470	100.00
Republican hold			

=== District 124 ===
124th District Democratic primary details

Democratic Primary, 124th District
Party	Candidate	Votes	%
Democratic	Tara Hallmark	Unopposed	
Total votes		604	100.0

124th District Republican primary details

Republican Primary, 124th District
Party	Candidate	Votes	%
Republican	Don Mayhew (incumbent)	Unopposed	
Total votes		5,891	100.0

2024 Missouri House of Representatives election, 124th District
Party	Candidate	Votes	%
Republican	Don Mayhew (incumbent)	15,637	82.81
Democratic	Tara Hallmark	3,247	17.19
Total votes		18,884	100.00
Republican hold			

=== District 125 ===
125th District Democratic primary details

Democratic Primary, 125th District
Party	Candidate	Votes	%
Democratic	Lynda Jones	Unopposed	
Total votes		748	100.0

125th District Republican primary details
Dane Diehl

Organizations

- Missouri Right to Life PAC

Republican Primary, 125th District
Party	Candidate	Votes	%
Republican	Dane Diehl (incumbent)	Unopposed	
Total votes		6,799	100.0

2024 Missouri House of Representatives election, 125th District
Party	Candidate	Votes	%
Republican	Dane Diehl (incumbent)	14,970	83.64
Democratic	Lynda Jones	2,929	16.36
Total votes		17,899	100.00
Republican hold			

=== District 126 ===
126th District Democratic primary details

Democratic Primary, 126th District
Party	Candidate	Votes	%
Democratic	Kirsten Hockaday	Unopposed	
Total votes		1,073	100.0

126th District Republican primary details

Republican Primary, 126th District
Party	Candidate	Votes	%
Republican	Jim Kalberloh (incumbent)	Unopposed	
Total votes		5,931	100.0

2024 Missouri House of Representatives election, 126th District
Party	Candidate	Votes	%
Republican	Jim Kalberloh (incumbent)	14,800	79.17
Democratic	Kirsten Hockaday	3,894	20.83
Total votes		18,694	100.00
Republican hold			

=== District 127 ===
127th District Democratic primary details

Democratic Primary, 127th District
Party	Candidate	Votes	%
Democratic	Marvin Manring	Unopposed	
Total votes		530	100.0

127th District Republican primary details
Ann Kelley

Organizations

- Missouri Right to Life PAC

Republican Primary, 127th District
Party	Candidate	Votes	%
Republican	Ann Kelley (incumbent)	Unopposed	
Total votes		6,817	100.0

2024 Missouri House of Representatives election, 127th District
Party	Candidate	Votes	%
Republican	Ann Kelley (incumbent)	16,473	85.46
Democratic	Marvin Manring	2,802	14.54
Total votes		19,275	100.00
Republican hold			

=== District 128 ===
128th District Democratic primary details

Democratic Primary, 128th District
Party	Candidate	Votes	%
Democratic	Rich Horton	Unopposed	
Total votes		814	100.0

128th District Republican primary details
Christopher Warwick

Organizations

- Missouri Right to Life PAC

Republican Primary, 128th District
Party	Candidate	Votes	%
Republican	Christopher D Warwick	3,541	54.2
Republican	John Best	1,920	29.4
Republican	Derral Reynolds	700	10.7
Republican	Bill Yarberry	371	5.7
Total votes		6,532	100.00

2024 Missouri House of Representatives election, 128th District
Party	Candidate	Votes	%
Republican	Christopher D Warwick	15,497	81.78
Democratic	Rich Horton	3,453	18.22
Total votes		18,950	100.00
Republican hold			

=== District 129 ===
129th District Democratic primary details

Democratic Primary, 129th District
Party	Candidate	Votes	%
Democratic	Louise Hansen	Unopposed	
Total votes		805	100.0

129th District Republican primary details

Republican Primary, 129th District
Party	Candidate	Votes	%
Republican	John Black (incumbent)	Unopposed	
Total votes		5,158	100.0

2024 Missouri House of Representatives election, 129th District
Party	Candidate	Votes	%
Republican	John Black (incumbent)	15,751	82.32
Democratic	Louise Hansen	3,382	17.68
Total votes		19,133	100.00
Republican hold			

=== District 130 ===
130th District Democratic primary details

Democratic Primary, 130th District
Party	Candidate	Votes	%
Democratic	Leslie Jones	Unopposed	
Total votes		1,179	100.0

130th District Republican primary details
Bishop Davidson

Organizations

- Missouri Right to Life PAC

Republican Primary, 130th District
Party	Candidate	Votes	%
Republican	Bishop Davidson (incumbent)	Unopposed	
Total votes		3,344	100.0

2024 Missouri House of Representatives election, 130th District
Party	Candidate	Votes	%
Republican	Bishop Davidson (incumbent)	12,578	67.86
Democratic	Leslie Jones	5,957	32.14
Total votes		18,535	100.00
Republican hold			

=== District 131 ===
131st District Democratic primary details

Democratic Primary, 131st District
Party	Candidate	Votes	%
Democratic	Ashley Cossins	Unopposed	
Total votes		1,214	100.0

131st District Republican primary details
Bill Owen

Organizations

- Missouri Right to Life PAC

Republican Primary, 131st District
Party	Candidate	Votes	%
Republican	Bill Owen (incumbent)	Unopposed	
Total votes		5,448	100.0

2024 Missouri House of Representatives election, 131st District
Party	Candidate	Votes	%
Republican	Bill Owen (incumbent)	15,781	75.95
Democratic	Ashley Cossins	4,997	24.05
Total votes		20,778	100.00
Republican hold			

=== District 132 ===
132nd District Democratic primary details

Democratic Primary, 132nd District
Party	Candidate	Votes	%
Democratic	Jeremy Dean	Unopposed	
Total votes		1,210	100.0

132nd District Republican primary details
Stephanos Freeman

Organizations

- Missouri Right to Life PAC (co-endorsed McAfee)
Bernadean McAfee

Organizations

- Missouri Right to Life PAC (co-endorsed Freeman)

Republican Primary, 132nd District
Party	Candidate	Votes	%
Republican	Stephanos Freeman	752	59.5
Republican	Bernadean McAfee	512	40.5
Total votes		1,264	100.00

2024 Missouri House of Representatives election, 132nd District
Party	Candidate	Votes	%
Democratic	Jeremy Dean	5,450	51.61
Republican	Stephanos Freeman	5,109	48.39
Total votes		10,559	100.0
Democratic hold			

=== District 133 ===
133rd District Democratic primary details

Democratic Primary, 133rd District
Party	Candidate	Votes	%
Democratic	Derrick Nowlin	Unopposed	
Total votes		1,325	100.0

133rd District Republican primary details
Melanie Stinnett

Organizations

- Missouri Right to Life PAC

Republican Primary, 133rd District
Party	Candidate	Votes	%
Republican	Melanie Stinnett (incumbent)	Unopposed	
Total votes		1,741	100.0

2024 Missouri House of Representatives election, 133rd District
Party	Candidate	Votes	%
Republican	Melanie Stinnett (incumbent)	7,431	56.12
Democratic	Derrick Nowlin	5,810	43.88
Total votes		13,241	100.00
Republican hold			

=== District 134 ===
134th District Republican primary details
Alex Riley

Organizations

- Missouri Right to Life PAC

Republican Primary, 134th District
Party	Candidate	Votes	%
Republican	Alex Riley (incumbent)	Unopposed	
Total votes		3,792	100.0

2024 Missouri House of Representatives election, 134th District
Party	Candidate	Votes	%
Republican	Alex Riley (incumbent)	Unopposed	
Total votes		16,472	100.0

=== District 135 ===
135th District Democratic primary details

Democratic Primary, 135th District
Party	Candidate	Votes	%
Democratic	Betsy Fogle (incumbent)	Unopposed	
Total votes		2,291	100.0

135th District Republican primary details
Michael Hasty

Organizations

- Missouri Right to Life PAC

Republican Primary, 135th District
Party	Candidate	Votes	%
Republican	Michael Hasty	Unopposed	
Total votes		2,070	100.0

2024 Missouri House of Representatives election, 135th District
Party	Candidate	Votes	%
Democratic	Betsy Fogle (incumbent)	8,529	55.01
Republican	Michael Hasty	6,974	44.99
Total votes		15,503	100.0
Democratic hold			

=== District 136 ===
136th District Democratic primary details

Democratic Primary, 136th District
Party	Candidate	Votes	%
Democratic	Stephanie Hein (incumbent)	Unopposed	
Total votes		2,764	100.0

136th District Republican primary details
Jim Robinette

Organizations

- Missouri Right to Life PAC

Republican Primary, 136th District
Party	Candidate	Votes	%
Republican	Jim Robinette	Unopposed	
Total votes		3,035	100.0

2024 Missouri House of Representatives election, 136th District
Party	Candidate	Votes	%
Democratic	Stephanie Hein (incumbent)	9,329	51.00
Republican	Jim Robinette	8,964	49.00
Total votes		18,293	100.0
Democratic hold			

=== District 137 ===
137th District Democratic primary details

Democratic Primary, 137th District
Party	Candidate	Votes	%
Democratic	Bryce Lockwood	Unopposed	
Total votes		1,979	100.0

137th District Republican primary details
Darin Chappell

Organizations

- Missouri Right to Life PAC

Republican Primary, 137th District
Party	Candidate	Votes	%
Republican	Darin Chappell (incumbent)	Unopposed	
Total votes		6,170	100.0

2024 Missouri House of Representatives election, 137th District
Party	Candidate	Votes	%
Republican	Darin Chappell (incumbent)	16,584	70.35
Democratic	Bryce Lockwood	6,988	29.65
Total votes		23,572	100.00
Republican hold			

=== District 138 ===
138th District Republican primary details
Tom Franiak

Organizations

- Missouri Right to Life PAC (co-endorsed Whaley)
Burt Whaley

Organizations

- Missouri Right to Life PAC (co-endorsed Franiak)

Republican Primary, 138th District
Party	Candidate	Votes	%
Republican	Burt Whaley	5,978	72.6
Republican	Tom Franiak	2,257	27.4
Total votes		8,235	100.00

2024 Missouri House of Representatives election, 138th District
Party	Candidate	Votes	%
Republican	Burt Whaley	Unopposed	
Total votes		20,287	100.0

=== District 139 ===
139th District Democratic primary details

Democratic Primary, 139th District
Party	Candidate	Votes	%
Democratic	Mark Gray	Unopposed	
Total votes		1,152	100.0

139th District Republican primary details
Bob Titus

Organizations

- Missouri Right to Life PAC

Republican Primary, 139th District
Party	Candidate	Votes	%
Republican	Bob Titus (incumbent)	Unopposed	
Total votes		5,027	100.0

2024 Missouri House of Representatives election, 139th District
Party	Candidate	Votes	%
Republican	Bob Titus (incumbent)	16,312	75.02
Democratic	Mark Gray	5,432	24.98
Total votes		21,744	100.00
Republican hold			

=== District 140 ===
140th District Democratic primary details

Democratic Primary, 140th District
Party	Candidate	Votes	%
Democratic	Julia Curran	Unopposed	
Total votes		931	100.0

140th District Republican primary details
Jamie Gragg

Organizations

- Missouri Right to Life PAC

Republican Primary, 140th District
Party	Candidate	Votes	%
Republican	Jamie Gragg (incumbent)	3,468	62.8
Republican	Danny Garrison	2,050	37.2
Total votes		5,518	100.00

2024 Missouri House of Representatives election, 140th District
Party	Candidate	Votes	%
Republican	Jamie Gragg (incumbent)	15,895	76.45
Democratic	Julie Curran	4,897	23.55
Total votes		20,792	100.00
Republican hold			

=== District 141 ===
141st District Democratic primary details

Democratic Primary, 141st District
Party	Candidate	Votes	%
Democratic	Michael Bates	Unopposed	
Total votes		495	100.0

141st District Republican primary details
Melissa Schmidt

Organizations

- Missouri Right to Life PAC (co-endorsed Williams)
Zach Williams

Organizations

- Missouri Right to Life PAC (co-endorsed Schmidt)

Republican Primary, 141st District
Party	Candidate	Votes	%
Republican	Melissa Schmidt	4,128	48.5
Republican	Zach Williams	3,749	44.1
Republican	John S Perperian	627	7.4
Total votes		8,999	100.00

2024 Missouri House of Representatives election, 141st District
Party	Candidate	Votes	%
Republican	Melissa Schmidt	17,657	88.16
Democratic	Michael Bates	2,372	11.84
Total votes		20,029	100.00
Republican hold			

=== District 142 ===
142nd District Republican primary details

Republican Primary, 142nd District
Party	Candidate	Votes	%
Republican	Jeff Knight (incumbent)	Unopposed	
Total votes		6,488	100.0

2024 Missouri House of Representatives election, 142nd District
Party	Candidate	Votes	%
Republican	Jeff Knight (incumbent)	Unopposed	
Total votes		16,122	100.0

=== District 143 ===
143rd District Democratic primary details

Democratic Primary, 143rd District
Party	Candidate	Votes	%
Democratic	Bernadette Holzer	Unopposed	
Total votes		736	100.0

143rd District Republican primary details
Bennie Cook

Organizations

- Missouri Right to Life PAC

Republican Primary, 143rd District
Party	Candidate	Votes	%
Republican	Bennie Cook (incumbent)	5,707	77.4
Republican	Philip Lohmann	1,668	22.6
Total votes		7,375	100.00

2024 Missouri House of Representatives election, 143rd District
Party	Candidate	Votes	%
Republican	Bennie Cook (incumbent)	16,299	85.60
Democratic	Bernadette Holzer	2,742	14.40
Total votes		19,041	100.00
Republican hold			

=== District 144 ===
144th District Democratic primary details

Democratic Primary, 144th District
Party	Candidate	Votes	%
Democratic	Andrew J. Eye	Unopposed	
Total votes		767	100.0

144th District Republican primary details
Tony Harbison

Organizations

- Missouri Right to Life PAC (co-endorsed Loyd and Usher)
Joe Loyd

Organizations

- Missouri Right to Life PAC (co-endorsed Harbison and Usher)
Paul (Buck) Usher

Organizations

- Missouri Right to Life PAC (co-endorsed Harbison and Loyd)

Republican Primary, 144th District
Party	Candidate	Votes	%
Republican	Tony R Harbison	3,317	45.8
Republican	Joe Loyd	2,854	39.4
Republican	Paul (Buck) Usher	1,072	14.8
Total votes		7,243	100.00

2024 Missouri House of Representatives election, 144th District
Party	Candidate	Votes	%
Republican	Tony R Harbison	15,749	82.59
Democratic	Andrew J. Eye	3,320	17.41
Total votes		19,069	100.00
Republican hold			

=== District 145 ===
145th District Republican primary details
Dave Soto

Organizations

- Missouri Right to Life PAC (co-endorsed Wolfin)
Bryant Wolfin

Organizations

- Missouri Right to Life PAC (co-endorsed Soto)

Republican Primary, 145th District
Party	Candidate	Votes	%
Republican	Bryant Wolfin	3,601	54.2
Republican	Dave Soto	3,044	45.8
Total votes		6,645	100.00

2024 Missouri House of Representatives election, 145th District
Party	Candidate	Votes	%
Republican	Bryant Wolfin	Unopposed	
Total votes		15,567	100.0

=== District 146 ===
146th District Republican primary details
Barry Hovis

Organizations

- Missouri Right to Life PAC

Republican Primary, 146th District
Party	Candidate	Votes	%
Republican	Barry Hovis (incumbent)	4,555	53.9
Republican	Lucas Green	3,892	46.1
Total votes		8,447	100.00

2024 Missouri House of Representatives election, 146th District
Party	Candidate	Votes	%
Republican	Barry Hovis (incumbent)	Unopposed	
Total votes		19,211	100.0

=== District 147 ===
147th District Democratic primary details

Democratic Primary, 147th District
Party	Candidate	Votes	%
Democratic	J. Michael Davis	Unopposed	
Total votes		1,064	100.0

147th District Republican primary details

Republican Primary, 147th District
Party	Candidate	Votes	%
Republican	John Voss (incumbent)	Unopposed	
Total votes		3,850	100.0

147th District Libertarian primary details

Libertarian Primary, 147th District
Party	Candidate	Votes	%
Libertarian	Greg Tlapek	Unopposed	
Total votes		6	100.0

2024 Missouri House of Representatives election, 147th District
Party	Candidate	Votes	%
Republican	John Voss (incumbent)	9,362	61.95
Democratic	J. Michael Davis	5,118	33.87
Libertarian	Greg Tlapek	632	4.18
Total votes		15,112	100.0
Republican hold			

=== District 148 ===
148th District Republican primary details
David Dolan

Organizations

- Missouri Right to Life PAC (co-endorsed Senciboy)
Gary Senciboy

Organizations

- Missouri Right to Life PAC (co-endorsed Dolan)

Republican Primary, 148th District
Party	Candidate	Votes	%
Republican	David A Dolan	4,264	57.6
Republican	Gary Senciboy	3,135	42.4
Total votes		7,399	100.00

2024 Missouri House of Representatives election, 148th District
Party	Candidate	Votes	%
Republican	David A Dolan	Unopposed	
Total votes		15,168	100.0

=== District 149 ===
149th District Republican primary details
Donnie Brown

Organizations

- Missouri Right to Life PAC

Republican Primary, 149th District
Party	Candidate	Votes	%
Republican	Donnie Brown (incumbent)	Unopposed	
Total votes		4,179	100.0

2024 Missouri House of Representatives election, 149th District
Party	Candidate	Votes	%
Republican	Donnie Brown (incumbent)	Unopposed	
Total votes		11,928	100.0

=== District 150 ===
150th District Democratic primary details

Democratic Primary, 150th District
Party	Candidate	Votes	%
Democratic	Kay Collier	Unopposed	
Total votes		363	100.0

150th District Republican primary details

Republican Primary, 150th District
Party	Candidate	Votes	%
Republican	Cameron Parker (incumbent)	Unopposed	
Total votes		5,366	100.0

2024 Missouri House of Representatives election, 150th District
Party	Candidate	Votes	%
Republican	Cameron Parker (incumbent)	11,859	82.20
Democratic	Kay Collier	2,568	17.80
Total votes			100.00
Republican hold			

=== District 151 ===
151st District Democratic primary details

Democratic Primary, 151st District
Party	Candidate	Votes	%
Democratic	Donnie Hovis	Unopposed	
Total votes		434	100.0

151st District Republican primary details
Steve Jordan

Organizations

- Missouri Right to Life PAC

Republican Primary, 151st District
Party	Candidate	Votes	%
Republican	Steve W. Jordan	Unopposed	
Total votes		6,809	100.0

2024 Missouri House of Representatives election, 151st District
Party	Candidate	Votes	%
Republican	Steve W Jordan	15,972	85.21
Democratic	Donnie Lynn Hovis Jr.	2,773	14.79
Total votes		18,745	100.00
Republican hold			

=== District 152 ===
152nd District Republican primary details
Hardy Billington

Organizations

- Missouri Right to Life PAC

Republican Primary, 152nd District
Party	Candidate	Votes	%
Republican	Hardy Billington (incumbent)	Unopposed	
Total votes		3,949	100.0

2024 Missouri House of Representatives election, 152nd District
Party	Candidate	Votes	%
Republican	Hardy Billington (incumbent)	Unopposed	
Total votes		13,294	100.0

=== District 153 ===
153rd District Democratic primary details

Democratic Primary, 153rd District
Party	Candidate	Votes	%
Democratic	Sheila Bristol	Unopposed	
Total votes		513	100.0

153rd District Republican primary details
Vinnie Clubb

Organizations

- Missouri Right to Life PAC (co-endorsed Elliott)
Keith Elliott

Organizations

- Missouri Right to Life PAC (co-endorsed Clubb)

Republican Primary, 153rd District
Party	Candidate	Votes	%
Republican	Keith W. Elliott	5,027	58.6
Republican	Vinnie Clubb	3,554	41.4
Total votes		8,581	100.00

2024 Missouri House of Representatives election, 153rd District
Party	Candidate	Votes	%
Republican	Keith W. Elliott	16,984	85.35
Democratic	Sheila Bristol	2,916	14.65
Total votes		19,900	100.00
Republican hold			

=== District 154 ===
154th District Democratic primary details

Democratic Primary, 154th District
Party	Candidate	Votes	%
Democratic	JoJo Stewart	Unopposed	
Total votes		597	100.0

154th District Republican primary details
Mark Collins

Organizations

- Missouri Right to Life PAC (co-endorsed Durnell)
Lisa Durnell

Organizations

- Missouri Right to Life PAC (co-endorsed Collins)

Republican Primary, 154th District
Party	Candidate	Votes	%
Republican	Lisa Durnell	4,111	53.8
Republican	Mark B. Collins	2,715	35.5
Republican	Larry R. Lindeman	817	10.7
Total votes		7,643	100.00

2024 Missouri House of Representatives election, 154th District
Party	Candidate	Votes	%
Republican	Lisa Durnell	15,196	84.78
Democratic	JoJo Stewart	2,728	15.22
Total votes		17,924	100.00
Republican hold			

=== District 155 ===
155th District Democratic primary details

Democratic Primary, 155th District
Party	Candidate	Votes	%
Democratic	Courtney Sweeney-Legore	Unopposed	
Total votes		670	100.0

155th District Republican primary details
Julie AuBuchon

Organizations

- Missouri Right to Life PAC (co-endorsed Overcast)
Matthew Overcast

Organizations

- Missouri Right to Life PAC (co-endorsed AuBuchon)

Republican Primary, 155th District
Party	Candidate	Votes	%
Republican	Matthew Overcast	6,104	70.0
Republican	Julie AuBuchon	2,622	30.0
Total votes		8,726	100.00

2024 Missouri House of Representatives election, 155th District
Party	Candidate	Votes	%
Republican	Matthew Overcast	17,480	83.03
Democratic	Courtney Sweeney-Legore	3,573	16.97
Total votes		21,053	100.00
Republican hold			

=== District 156 ===
156th District Democratic primary details

Democratic Primary, 156th District
Party	Candidate	Votes	%
Democratic	Janis Beacham	Unopposed	
Total votes		614	100.0

156th District Republican primary details
Brian Seitz

Organizations

- Missouri Right to Life PAC

Republican Primary, 156th District
Party	Candidate	Votes	%
Republican	Brian Seitz (incumbent)	4,178	81.1
Republican	Carolyn Boss	975	18.9
Total votes		5,153	100.00

2024 Missouri House of Representatives election, 156th District
Party	Candidate	Votes	%
Republican	Brian Seitz (incumbent)	13,399	78.90
Democratic	Janis Beacham	3,583	21.10
Total votes		16,982	100.00
Republican hold			

=== District 157 ===
157th District Republican primary details
Mitch Boggs

Organizations

- Missouri Right to Life PAC

Republican Primary, 157th District
Party	Candidate	Votes	%
Republican	Mitch Boggs (incumbent)	Unopposed	
Total votes		5,081	100.0

2024 Missouri House of Representatives election, 157th District
Party	Candidate	Votes	%
Republican	Mitch Boggs (incumbent)	Unopposed	
Total votes		15,504	100.0

=== District 158 ===
158th District Democratic primary details

Democratic Primary, 158th District
Party	Candidate	Votes	%
Democratic	Yma Sautbine	Unopposed	
Total votes		561	100.0

158th District Republican primary details
Scott Cupps

Organizations

- Missouri Right to Life PAC

Republican Primary, 158th District
Party	Candidate	Votes	%
Republican	Scott Cupps (incumbent)	Unopposed	
Total votes		6,274	100.0

2024 Missouri House of Representatives election, 158th District
Party	Candidate	Votes	%
Republican	Scott Cupps (incumbent)	14,924	85.09
Democratic	Yma Sautbine	2,616	14.91
Total votes		17,540	100.00
Republican hold			

=== District 159 ===
159th District Republican primary details
Dirk Deaton

Organizations

- Missouri Right to Life PAC

Republican Primary, 159th District
Party	Candidate	Votes	%
Republican	Dirk Deaton (incumbent)	Unopposed	
Total votes		5,577	100.0

2024 Missouri House of Representatives election, 159th District
Party	Candidate	Votes	%
Republican	Dirk Deaton (incumbent)	Unopposed	
Total votes		15,865	100.0

=== District 160 ===
160th District Democratic primary details

Democratic Primary, 160th District
Party	Candidate	Votes	%
Democratic	Rebecca Jensen	Unopposed	
Total votes		670	100.0

160th District Republican primary details
Ben Baker

Organizations

- Missouri Right to Life PAC

Republican Primary, 160th District
Party	Candidate	Votes	%
Republican	Ben Baker (incumbent)	Unopposed	
Total votes		5,499	100.0

2024 Missouri House of Representatives election, 160th District
Party	Candidate	Votes	%
Republican	Ben Baker (incumbent)	14,416	77.92
Democratic	Rebecca Stipp Jensen	4,085	22.08
Total votes		18,501	100.00
Republican hold			

=== District 161 ===
161st District Democratic primary details

Democratic Primary, 161st District
Party	Candidate	Votes	%
Democratic	Shawna Ackerson	Unopposed	
Total votes		719	100.0

161st District Republican primary details
Lane Roberts

Organizations

- Missouri Right to Life PAC

Republican Primary, 161st District
Party	Candidate	Votes	%
Republican	Lane Roberts (incumbent)	1,523	65.0
Republican	Thomas Ross	819	35.0
Total votes		2,342	100.00

2024 Missouri House of Representatives election, 161st District
Party	Candidate	Votes	%
Republican	Lane Roberts (incumbent)	8,490	63.96
Democratic	Shawna Ackerson	4,783	36.04
Total votes		13,273	100.00
Republican hold			

=== District 162 ===
162nd District Republican primary details

Republican Primary, 162nd District
Party	Candidate	Votes	%
Republican	Bob Bromley (incumbent)	Unopposed	
Total votes		3,566	100.0

2024 Missouri House of Representatives election, 162nd District
Party	Candidate	Votes	%
Republican	Bob Bromley (incumbent)	Unopposed	
Total votes		15,495	100.0

=== District 163 ===
163rd District Democratic primary details

Democratic Primary, 163rd District
Party	Candidate	Votes	%
Democratic	Philip D. Wilson	Unopposed	
Total votes		529	100.0

163rd District Republican primary details
Cathy Loy

Organizations

- Missouri Right to Life PAC

Republican Primary, 163rd District
Party	Candidate	Votes	%
Republican	Cathy Jo Loy	2,984	66.3
Republican	Zach Hatcher	1,517	33.7
Total votes		4,501	100.00

2024 Missouri House of Representatives election, 163rd District
Party	Candidate	Votes	%
Republican	Cathy Jo Loy	11,855	78.34
Democratic	Philip D. Wilson	3,278	21.66
Total votes		15,133	100.00
Republican hold			

== See also ==
- 2024 Missouri State Senate election
- List of Missouri General Assemblies
