= Cecelie Williams =

American politician from Missouri

Member of the Missouri House of Representatives from the 111th district
- Incumbent
- Assumed office January 8, 2025
- Preceded by: Gary Bonacker

Personal details
- Born: Jonesburg, Missouri, U.S.
- Party: Republican
- Website: citizensforceceliewilliams.com

Cecelie R. Dunlap Williams (born 1980) is an American politician who was elected member of the Missouri House of Representatives for the 111th district in 2024.

She and her husband Rich have seven children and 2 grandchildren. She is a descendent of the American pioneer Daniel Boone.

Williams is an advocate for a law change which would allow pregnant women to divorce.
