= Sonya Anderson =

American politician

Member of the Missouri House of Representatives from the 131st district
- In office January 9, 2013 – January 6, 2021
- Preceded by: Bill Lant
- Succeeded by: Bill Owen

Personal details
- Born: February 24, 1970 (age 56) Greene County, Missouri, U.S.
- Party: Republican

Sonya Anderson (born February 24, 1970) is an American politician who has served in the Missouri House of Representatives from the 131st district since 2013.
