= Chris Lonsdale (politician) =

American politician

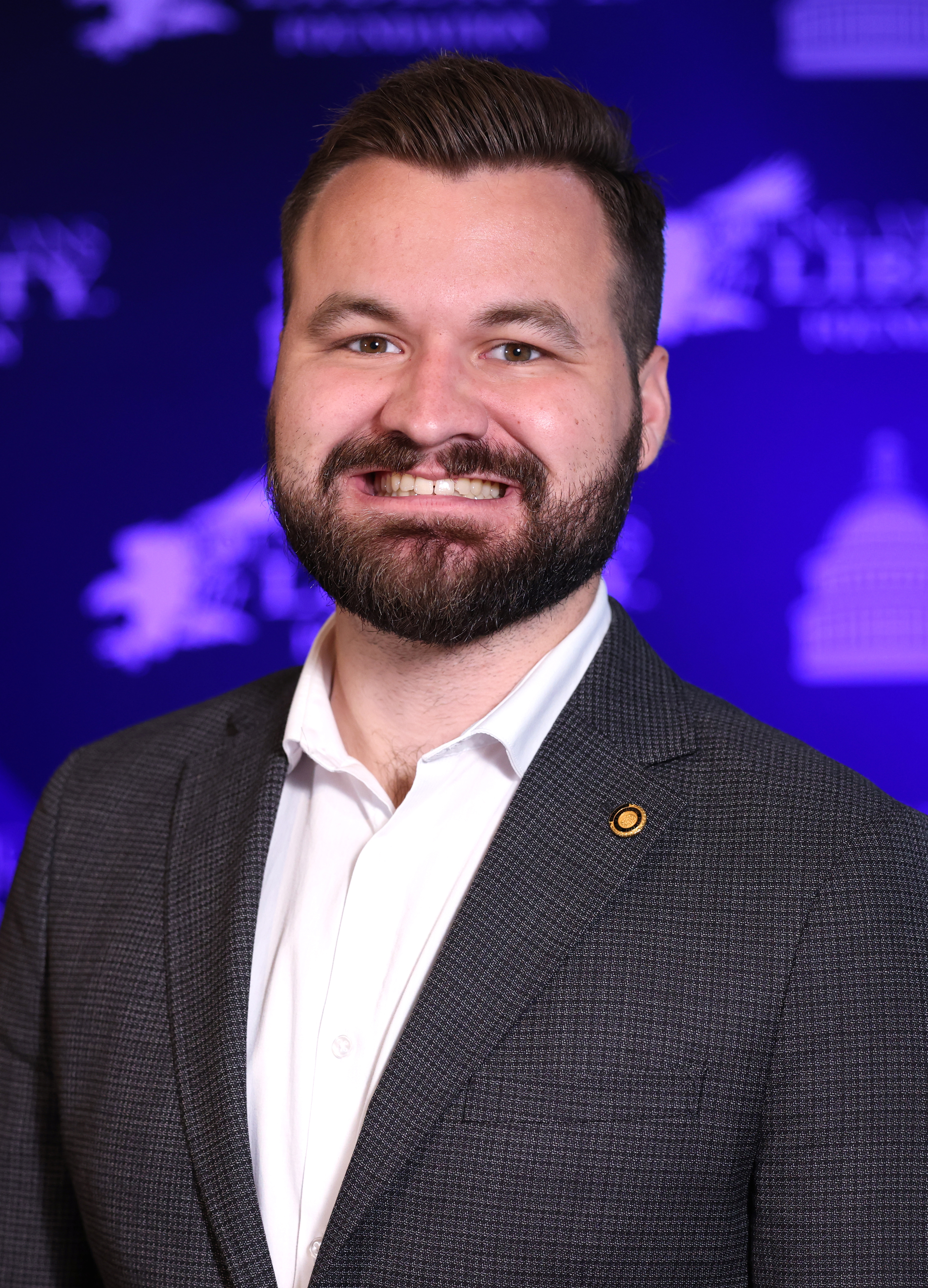
- Lonsdale at the 2024 Hazlitt Summit hosted by Young Americans for Liberty Foundation

Member of the Missouri House of Representatives from the 38th district
- In office January 4, 2023 – January 8, 2025
- Preceded by: Doug Richey (redistricting)
- Succeeded by: Martin Jacobs

Personal details
- Born: Liberty, Missouri
- Party: Republican
- Education: University of Missouri-Columbia (B.A.)
- Website: https://lonsdaleformissouri.com/

Chris Lonsdale (born 1995 or 1996) is an American politician. A member of the Republican Party, he has represented the 38th district in the Missouri House of Representatives since 2023. Lonsdale lost his re-election campaign in the 2024 election.

== Early life and education ==
Lonsdale graduated from Liberty High School in 2014. He holds a bachelor's degree in mathematics from the University of Missouri-Columbia.

== Career ==
In the 2022 Missouri House of Representatives election, Lonsdale was elected in District 38. He served on the Local Government and Utilities Committees along with the Special Committees on Government Accountability, Property Tax Reform and Tourism. Chris was accused of heckling a black and gay conservative commentator at a MAGA event in December 2023.

Lonsdale lost re-election in 2024 to Democrat Martin Jacobs.

== Personal life ==
Lonsdale lives in Liberty, Missouri.

== Electoral history ==
Missouri House of Representatives Republican Primary Election, August 2, 2022, District 38
Party	Candidate	Votes	%
Republican	Chris Lonsdale	2,001	53.09%
Republican	Eben Hall	1,768	46.91%
Total votes		3,769	100.00%

Missouri House of Representatives General Election, November 8, 2022, District 38
Party	Candidate	Votes	%
Republican	Chris Lonsdale	10,111	100.00%
Total votes		10,111	100.00%

Missouri House of Representatives General Election, November 5, 2024, District 38
Party	Candidate	Votes	%
Democratic	Martin Jacobs	10,321	51.31%
Republican	Chris Lonsdale	9,794	48.69%
Total votes		20,115	100.00%
