= Marilyn Ruestman =

American politician

Member of the Missouri House of Representatives from the 131st district
- In office January 8, 2003 – January 5, 2011
- Preceded by: Sam Gaskill
- Succeeded by: Bill Lant

Personal details
- Born: October 26, 1942 (age 83)
- Party: Republican

Marilyn Ruestman (born October 26, 1942) is an American politician who served in the Missouri House of Representatives from the 131st district from 2003 to 2011.
