= Mark Meirath =

American politician

Member of the Missouri House of Representatives from the 39th district
- Incumbent
- Assumed office January 8, 2025
- Preceded by: Doug Richey

Personal details
- Born: Lincoln, Nebraska, U.S.
- Party: Republican

Mark Meirath is an American politician who was elected member of the Missouri House of Representatives for the 39th district in 2024.

Meirath graduated from Archbishop O'Hara High School before attending Northwest Missouri State University and William Jewell College.
