= Gary Bonacker =

American politician

Member of the Missouri House of Representatives from the 111th district
- In office January 4, 2023 – January 8, 2025
- Preceded by: Shane Roden
- Succeeded by: Cecelie Williams

Personal details
- Born: St. Louis, Missouri
- Party: Republican

Gary Bonacker is an American politician who was a Republican member of the Missouri House of Representatives from 2023 to 2025, representing the state's 111th House district.

== Political career ==
In the 2022 Missouri House of Representatives election, Voss was elected in District 111. He stood for a second term in the 2024 election. He was unseated in the primary election by Cecelie Williams.
