= Martin Jacobs =

American politician

Member of the Missouri House of Representatives from the 38th district
- Incumbent
- Assumed office January 8, 2025
- Preceded by: Chris Lonsdale

Personal details
- Party: Democratic
- Website: https://jacobs4mo.com/

Martin (Marty) Jacobs is an American politician who was elected member of the Missouri House of Representatives for the 38th district in 2024.

Jacobs attended Gustavus Adolphus College and the University of Missouri. Jacobs spent 44 years working in education, serving as principal at Liberty High School and Liberty North High School.

== Missouri House of Representatives ==
In the 2024 election, Jacobs unseated incumbent Republican Chris Lonsdale.

In March 2025, Jacobs was one of seven House Democrats to vote for state takeover of St. Louis Metropolitan Police Department.
