= Tara Murray =

American politician

Member-elect of the Missouri House of Representatives from the 104th district
- Assuming office January 6, 2027
- Succeeding: Terri Violet

Personal details
- Born: St. Louis, Missouri
- Party: Democratic
- Education: Northeast Missouri State University; Truman State University
- Website: www.murray4mo.com

Tara L. Murray is an American politician of the Missouri Democratic Party who is the representative-elect for the 104th district in the Missouri House of Representatives. She was elected in the 2026 general election. She was previously a candidate in 2024. She is an educator.
