= Craig Fishel =

American politician

Member of the Missouri House of Representatives from the 136th district
- In office 2019–2023
- Succeeded by: Stephanie Hein

Personal details
- Born: 1949 or 1950 (age 76–77) Lebanon, Missouri, U.S.
- Party: Republican
- Spouse: Donna
- Children: two
- Profession: businessman

J. Craig Fishel (born 1949 or 1950) is an American politician. He was a member of the Missouri House of Representatives from the 136th District, serving from 2019 to 2023. He is a member of the Republican party.
