= Amy DeClue =

American politician

Member-elect of the Missouri House of Representatives from the 118th district
- Assuming office January 2027
- Succeeding: Mike McGirl

Personal details
- Party: Republican

Amy DeClue is an American politician. A member of the Republican Party, she is the member-elect for the 118th district of the Missouri House of Representatives.
