= Jeffery Justus =

American politician (born 1954)

Member of the Missouri House of Representatives from the 156th district
- In office 2013–2021
- Succeeded by: Brian Seitz

Personal details
- Born: February 18, 1954 (age 72) Springfield, Missouri, U.S.
- Party: Republican
- Spouse: Glenda
- Children: 3

Jeffery Justus (born February 18, 1954) is an American politician who served as a member of the Missouri House of Representatives for the 156th district from 2013 to 2021. He is a member of the Republican Party.
