= Kevin Garner =

American politician

Member-elect of the Missouri House of Representatives from the 24th district
- Assuming office January 2027
- Succeeding: Emily Weber

Personal details
- Party: Democratic

Kevin Garner is an American politician. A member of the Democratic Party, he is the member-elect for the 24th district of the Missouri House of Representatives.
