= Mike McGirl =

American politician

Member of the Missouri House of Representatives from the 118th district
- Incumbent
- Assumed office 2019
- Preceded by: Ben Harris
- Succeeded by: Amy DeClue (elect)

Personal details
- Party: Republican

Michael McGirl is an American politician serving in the Missouri House of Representatives from Missouri's 118th district. He won the seat after defeating Democrat Barbara Marco 65.6% to 34.4%, thereby flipping the district from Democratic to Republican. He had previously run against his predecessor Ben Harris in 2014.

== Electoral history ==
Missouri House of Representatives Election, November 4, 2014, District 118
Party	Candidate	Votes	%	±%
Democratic	Ben Harris	4,555	52.35%	
Republican	Mike McGirl	4,146	47.65%	
Total votes		8,701	100.00%	

Missouri House of Representatives Primary Election, August 7, 2018, District 118
Party	Candidate	Votes	%	±%
Republican	Mike McGirl	2,982	61.83%	
Republican	Chuck Hoskins	1,250	25.92%	
Republican	Kyle Bone	591	12.25%	
Total votes		4,823	100.00%	

Missouri House of Representatives Election, November 6, 2018, District 118
Party	Candidate	Votes	%	±%
Republican	Mike McGirl	8,215	65.59%	+17.94
Democratic	Barbara Marco	4,309	34.41%	−17.94
Total votes		12,524	100.00%	

Missouri House of Representatives Election, November 3, 2020, District 118
Party	Candidate	Votes	%	±%
Republican	Mike McGirl	14,016	100.00%	+34.41
Total votes		14,016	100.00%	

Missouri House of Representatives Election, November 8, 2022, District 118
Party	Candidate	Votes	%	±%
Republican	Mike McGirl	9,420	75.64%	−24.36
Democratic	Sally Brooks	3,034	24.36%	+24.36
Total votes		12,454	100.00%	
