= Jamie Johnson (politician) =

American politician

Member of the Missouri House of Representatives from the 12th district
- In office January 4, 2023 – January 8, 2025
- Preceded by: Josh Hurlbert
- Succeeded by: Mike Jones

Personal details
- Born: Los Angeles, California
- Party: Democratic
- Website: www.jamieformo.com

Jamie Johnson is an American politician. A Democrat, she represented District 12 in the Missouri House of Representatives from 2023 to 2025.

== Early life ==
Johnson was born in Los Angeles, California. She moved to Missouri from New Orleans as a refugee displaced by Hurricane Katrina.

== Education ==
She is a member of Delta Sigma Theta sorority.

== Political career ==
Johnson was first elected in the 2022 Missouri House of Representatives election. In 2024, she was unseated by Republican Mike Jones.
