= Tracey Steele =

American politician

Member-elect of the Missouri House of Representatives from the 12th district
- Assuming office January 6, 2027
- Succeeding: Mike Jones

Personal details
- Party: Democratic
- Education: Northwest Missouri State University; University of California, Irvine School of Law
- Website: www.steeleformissouri.com

Tracey Steele is an American politician of the Missouri Democratic Party who is the representative-elect for the 12th district in the Missouri House of Representatives. He was elected in the 2026 general election. Steele is a lawyer.
