= William Worsham =

American politician

Member-elect of the Missouri House of Representatives from the 129th district
- Assuming office January 6, 2027
- Succeeding: John Black

Personal details
- Party: Republican
- Education: University of Missouri School of Law
- Website: Campaign website

William Worsham is an American politician of the Missouri Republican Party who is the representative-elect for the 129th district in the Missouri House of Representatives. He was elected in the 2026 general election. He is a lawyer.
