= Tim Taylor (politician) =

American politician

Member of the Missouri House of Representatives from the 48th district
- Incumbent
- Assumed office January 9, 2021
- Preceded by: Dave Muntzel

Personal details
- Party: Republican

Tim Taylor is a Missouri politician serving as a member of the Missouri House of Representatives in the 48th district.

== Missouri House of Representatives ==
=== Committee assignments ===
- Conservation and Natural Resources
- Public Safety
- Transportation
- Veterans

== Electoral history ==
Missouri House of Representatives Primary Election, August 4, 2020, District 48
Party	Candidate	Votes	%	±%
Republican	Tim Talyor	3,874	66.94%	
Republican	Don (Donnie) Baragary	1,913	33.06%	
Total votes		5,787	100.00%	

Missouri House of Representatives Election, November 3, 2020, District 48
Party	Candidate	Votes	%	±%
Republican	Tim Taylor	11,422	68.36%	
Democratic	Bill Betteridge	5,287	31.64%	
Total votes		16,709	100.00%	

Missouri House of Representatives Election, November 8, 2022, District 48
Party	Candidate	Votes	%	±%
Republican	Tim Taylor	11,759	100.00%	+31.64
Total votes		11,759	100.00%	
