= Joel Mace =

American politician

Member-elect of the Missouri House of Representatives from the 159th district
- Assuming office January 6, 2027
- Succeeding: Dirk Deaton

Personal details
- Party: Republican
- Website: Campaign website

David (Joel) Mace is an American politician of the Missouri Republican Party who is the representative-elect for the 159th district in the Missouri House of Representatives. He was elected in the 2026 general election. He is a detective with the Newton County Sheriff's Office.
