= Judy Morgan =

American politician (born 1948)

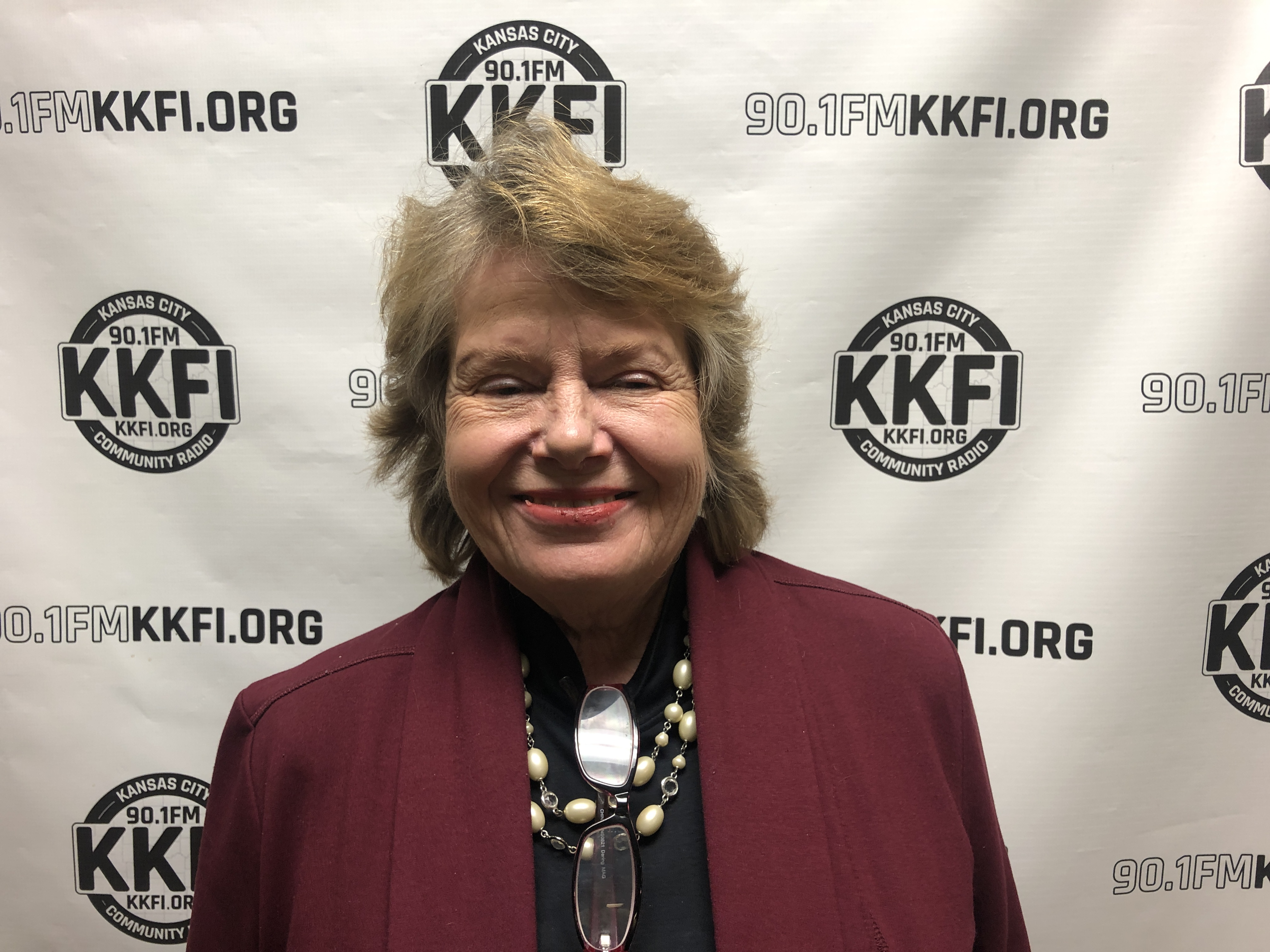

Member of the Missouri House of Representatives from the 24th district
- In office 2012 – January 6, 2021
- Preceded by: Jean Peters Baker
- Succeeded by: Emily Weber

Personal details
- Born: January 11, 1948 (age 78) Kansas City, Missouri, U.S.
- Party: Democratic
- Spouse: Gene Morgan
- Children: 1
- Profession: Politician

Judy Morgan (born January 11, 1948) is an American politician. She was a member of the Missouri House of Representatives who served 9 years between 2012 and January 6, 2021. She is a member of the Democratic Party. As of 2022 she was serving on the Board of the Children's Services Fund of Jackson County, Missouri, with a term scheduled to end 2025-03-31. She was also on the Community Advisory Council of KKFI.

== Electoral history ==
Morgan got 77 percent of the vote in a special election 2011-11-08 to fill the seat vacated by Jean Peters-Baker, who had resigned earlier that year to become the Prosecutor of Jackson County, Missouri. She served just under 4.5 terms, the maximum allowed under Missouri term limits.

She got 83 percent of the vote in 2012, and was unopposed in 2014, 2016, and 2018. She was termed out in 2020 and was replaced by Emily Weber.

== Life before political office ==
Ms. Morgan graduated from Bishop Hogan High School in 1966. She holds a bachelor's degree in Secondary Education and a master's degree in Guidance and Counseling from the University of Missouri-Kansas City.

Before being elected to the Missouri House, Ms. Morgan was a social studies teacher at Lincoln College Prep and Central High School for 14 years and worked as a counselor at Northeast High School for 15 years, both in the Kansas City, Missouri, School District. She also served as President of the American Federation of Teachers, Local 691, for 10 years. In 2010-09-22 she was elected to serve on the Board of 90.1 FM, KKFI, Kansas City Community Radio.

She is married with a daughter and son-in-law.
