= Stephanie Hein =

American academic and politician

Member of the Missouri House of Representatives from the 136th district
- Incumbent
- Assumed office January 4, 2023
- Preceded by: Craig Fishel

Personal details
- Born: Rolla, Missouri, U.S.
- Party: Democratic
- Education: Missouri State University (BA, MBA); University of Missouri (EdD)

Stephanie Hein is an American university professor and politician, and member of the Missouri House of Representatives from the 136th district, representing southeast Springfield. Elected in 2022, she assumed office in January, 2023.

== Early life ==
Upon graduating from Hartville High School in Hartville, Missouri, Hein received her Bachelor of Science in Hospitality and Business Administration and MBA from Missouri State University, and EdD in Educational Leadership and Policy Analysis from the University of Missouri.

== Career ==
Hein served as chair for the Springfield Convention and Visitors Bureau, Treasurer International Council on Hotel, Restaurant, and Institutional Education and Capital Campaign Assistant for the Ronald McDonald House, In 2022, Hein became a faculty emeritus at Missouri State University in the department of hospitality in order to focus on her run for the Missouri House. She defeated incumbent Republican Craig Fishel, flipping the seat.

== Electoral history ==
Missouri House of Representatives — District 136 — Greene County (2022)
Party	Candidate	Votes	%	±%
Democratic	Stephanie Hein	6,864	50.75%	+9.35
Republican	Craig Fishel	6,662	49.25	−9.35
