= John Black (Missouri politician) =

American politician

Member of the Missouri House of Representatives from the 129th district
- Incumbent
- Assumed office 2019
- Preceded by: Sandy Crawford
- Succeeded by: William Worsham (elect)

Personal details
- Born: 1952 (age 73–74) Springfield, Missouri, U.S.
- Party: Republican
- Spouse: Cynthia
- Children: 6
- Education: Missouri University of Science and Technology (BS); University of Missouri (JD)
- Profession: attorney, engineer

John F. Black (born 1952) is an American politician, serving as a member of the Missouri House of Representatives since 2019. His first two elections were from district 137, but after redistricting of 2022, he was reelected from district 129. He is a member of the Republican party.

Black lives in Marshfield, Missouri, with his wife Cynthia. He is a Methodist.

== Electoral history ==
=== State representative ===
Missouri House of Representatives Primary Election, August 7, 2018, District 137
Party	Candidate	Votes	%	±%
Republican	John Black	4,051	55.20%	
Republican	Georjene Tilton	3,288	44.80%	
Total votes		7,339	100.00%	

Missouri House of Representatives Election, November 6, 2018, District 137
Party	Candidate	Votes	%	±%
Republican	John Black	13,360	75.04%	
Democratic	Raymond Lampert	4,443	24.96%	
Total votes		17,803	100.00%	

Missouri House of Representatives Election, November 3, 2020, District 137
Party	Candidate	Votes	%	±%
Republican	John Black	17,381	78.02%	+2.98
Democratic	Raymond Lampert	4,898	21.98%	−2.98
Total votes		22,279	100.00%	

Missouri House of Representatives Election, November 8, 2022, District 129
Party	Candidate	Votes	%	±%
Republican	John Black	12,106	100.00%	+21.98
Total votes		12,106	100.00%	
