= Dave Muntzel =

American politician

Member of the Missouri House of Representatives from the 48th district
- In office 2013–2019
- Succeeded by: Tim Taylor

Personal details
- Born: September 30, 1950 (age 75) Boonville, Missouri
- Party: Republican
- Spouse: Marianne
- Children: Two
- Profession: Farmer

Dave Muntzel (born September 30, 1950) is an American politician. He is a former Republican member of the Missouri House of Representatives, having served from 2013-2019. After serving in the Missouri House for four terms, Muntzel was unable to file for reelection due to Missouri's statutory term limits.
