= John Simmons (Missouri politician) =

American politician

Member of the Missouri House of Representatives from the 109th district
- Incumbent
- Assumed office January 2025
- Preceded by: Kyle Marquart
- In office January 2019 – January 2023
- Preceded by: Paul Curtman
- Succeeded by: Kyle Marquart

Personal details
- Born: Avon, Connecticut, U.S.
- Party: Republican
- Spouse: Nanci
- Children: 3
- Education: Union College (BS); Logan University (DC)

John Simmons is an American politician and chiropractor who served as a member of the Missouri House of Representatives from the 109th district. Elected in November 2018, he assumed office in January 2019.

== Early life and education ==
Simmons was born in Avon, Connecticut. He earned a Bachelor of Science degree from Union College and a Doctor of Chiropractic from Logan University.

== Career ==
Simmons works as a chiropractor at the Simmons Wellness Center in Washington, Missouri. He was elected to the Missouri House of Representatives in November 2018 and assumed office in January 2019.
