= Emily Weber =

American politician

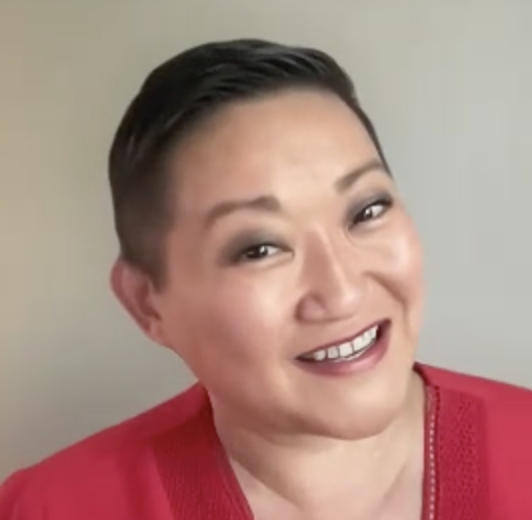

Member of the Missouri House of Representatives from the 24th district
- Incumbent
- Assumed office January 9, 2021
- Preceded by: Judy Morgan
- Succeeded by: Kevin Garner (elect)

Personal details
- Born: South Korea
- Party: Democratic

Emily Weber is a member of the Missouri House of Representatives representing the 24th district. She succeeded fellow Democrat Judy Morgan. Weber was born in South Korea.

== Missouri House of Representatives ==
=== Committee assignments ===
- Agriculture Policy
- General Laws
- Ways and Means
- Special Committee on Tourism

== Electoral history ==
Missouri House of Representatives Primary Election, August 4, 2020, District 24
Party	Candidate	Votes	%	±%
Democratic	Emily Weber	5,850	69.80%	
Democratic	Connor Nowalk	1,762	21.02%	
Democratic	Sammie Arnold	769	9.18%	
Total votes		8,381	100.00%	

Missouri House of Representatives Election, November 3, 2020, District 24
Party	Candidate	Votes	%	±%
Democratic	Emily Weber	20,167	88.97%	
Libertarian	Andrew Miller	2,501	11.03%	
Total votes		22,668	100.00%	

Missouri House of Representatives Primary Election, August 2, 2022, District 24
Party	Candidate	Votes	%	±%
Democratic	Emily Weber	4,969	100.00%	
Total votes		4,969	100.00%	

Missouri House of Representatives Election, November 8, 2022, District 24
Party	Candidate	Votes	%	±%
Democratic	Emily Weber	11,098	100.00%	+11.03
Total votes		11,098	100.00%	

Missouri House of Representatives Primary Election, August 6, 2024, District 24
Party	Candidate	Votes	%	±%
Democratic	Emily Weber	4,578	100.00%	
Total votes		4,578	100.00%	

Missouri House of Representatives Election, November 5, 2024, District 24
Party	Candidate	Votes	%	±%
Democratic	Emily Weber	14,797	85.0%	
Republican	Claudia S Toomim	2,604	15.0%	
Total votes		17,401	100.00%	
