= Bishop Davidson (politician) =

American politician

Member of the Missouri House of Representatives from the 130th district
- Incumbent
- Assumed office January 6, 2021
- Preceded by: Jeff Messenger

Personal details
- Born: Chesapeake, Virginia, U.S.
- Party: Republican
- Education: University of Missouri (BA)

Bishop Davidson is an American politician and businessman serving as a member of the Missouri House of Representatives from the 130th district. Elected in November 2020, he assumed office on January 6, 2021.

== Early life and education ==
Davidson was born in Chesapeake, Virginia and graduated from Republic High School in Republic, Missouri. He earned a Bachelor of Arts degree in history and classics from the University of Missouri in 2016.

== Career ==
As an undergraduate, Davidson interned for the Heritage Foundation. From 2017 to 2019, he was a regional director for the Intercollegiate Studies Institute. In 2019, he founded Pelion Learning LLC, an education and tutoring service. In 2024, he worked at Access Potential Therapy Services, a physical therapy practice founded by his mother.

=== Missouri House of Representatives ===
Davidson was elected to the Missouri House of Representatives in November 2020 and assumed office on January 6, 2021. He was re-elected in an unopposed race in 2022.

Davidson sponsored a bill to expand "missing children" to include 17 year olds. He also co-sponsored the Second Amendment Preservation Act, a bill that attempted to supersede federal gun restrictions that was later found unconstitutional. Davidson has supported efforts and filed legislation to add conditions to the citizen initiative process in Missouri.

In 2024, Davidson filed legislation to transition state income tax to a flat tax and expand sales taxes application.

In 2025, Davidson was appointed vice chair of the house budget committee by speaker Jon Patterson.

In 2026, Davidson sponsored Amendment 5, which would eliminate income tax in Missouri. It failed the August election.

== Electoral history ==
=== State representative ===
Missouri House of Representatives Primary Election, August 4, 2020, District 130
Party	Candidate	Votes	%	±%
Republican	Bishop Davidson	2,868	45.39%	
Republican	Macy Mitchell	2,704	42.79%	
Republican	Sam Snider	747	11.82%	
Total votes		6,319	100.00%	

Missouri House of Representatives Election, November 3, 2020, District 130
Party	Candidate	Votes	%	±%
Republican	Bishop Davidson	15,609	76.99%	
Democratic	Dave Gragg	4,665	23.01%	
Total votes		20,274	100.00%	

Missouri House of Representatives Election, November 8, 2022, District 130
Party	Candidate	Votes	%	±%
Republican	Bishop Davidson	9,434	100.00%	+23.01
Total votes		9,434	100.00%	

Missouri House of Representatives Election, November 5, 2024, District 130
Party	Candidate	Votes	%	±%
Republican	Bishop Davidson	12,578	67.9%	
Democratic	Leslie Jones	5,957	32.1%	
Total votes		18,535	100.00%	
