= Kyle Marquart =

American politician

Member of the Missouri House of Representatives from the 109th district
- In office January 4, 2023 – January 8, 2025
- Preceded by: John Simmons
- Succeeded by: John Simmons

Personal details
- Born: Washington, Missouri
- Party: Republican
- Education: Benedictine College

Kyle Marquart is an American politician who served as a Republican member of the Missouri House of Representatives from 2023 to 2025, representing the state's 109th House district. Marquart attended St. Francis Borgia High School and Benedictine College. He served for 30 years with the Missouri State Highway Patrol (MSHP). In the 2022 Missouri House of Representatives election, Marquart was elected in District 109, after unseating John Simmons in the Republican primary. Marquart is a member of the Knights of Columbus. Simmons won back his House seat in 2024.
