= Bill Owen (Missouri politician) =

American politician

Member of the Missouri House of Representatives from the 131st district
- Incumbent
- Assumed office January 6, 2021
- Preceded by: Sonya Anderson

Personal details
- Born: Springfield, Missouri, U.S.
- Party: Republican
- Education: Drury University; University of Wisconsin

Bill Owen is an American politician. He is a Republican member of the 131st district of the Missouri House of Representatives.

Born in Springfield, Missouri. Owen attended Parkview High School. After high school, he attended at Drury University, where he earned his undergraduate degree, and then attended the University of Wisconsin, where he earned his postgraduate education degree. He worked as a banker. In 2021, Owen won the election for the 131st district of the Missouri House of Representatives, succeeding Sonya Anderson. Owen assumed his office on January 6, 2021. Owen decided to run for re-election in 2022.

== Electoral history ==
=== State representative ===
Missouri House of Representatives Primary Election, August 4, 2020, District 131
Party	Candidate	Votes	%	±%
Republican	Bill Owen	3,088	85.85%	
Republican	Stephanos Freeman	509	14.15%	
Total votes		3,597	100.00%	

Missouri House of Representatives Election, November 3, 2020, District 131
Party	Candidate	Votes	%	±%
Republican	Bill Owen	10,827	65.74%	
Democratic	Allison Schoolcraft	5,642	34.26%	
Total votes		16,469	100.00%	

Missouri House of Representatives Election, November 8, 2022, District 131
Party	Candidate	Votes	%	±%
Republican	Bill Owen	12,492	100.00%	+34.26
Total votes		12,492	100.00%	
