= Brian Seitz =

American politician

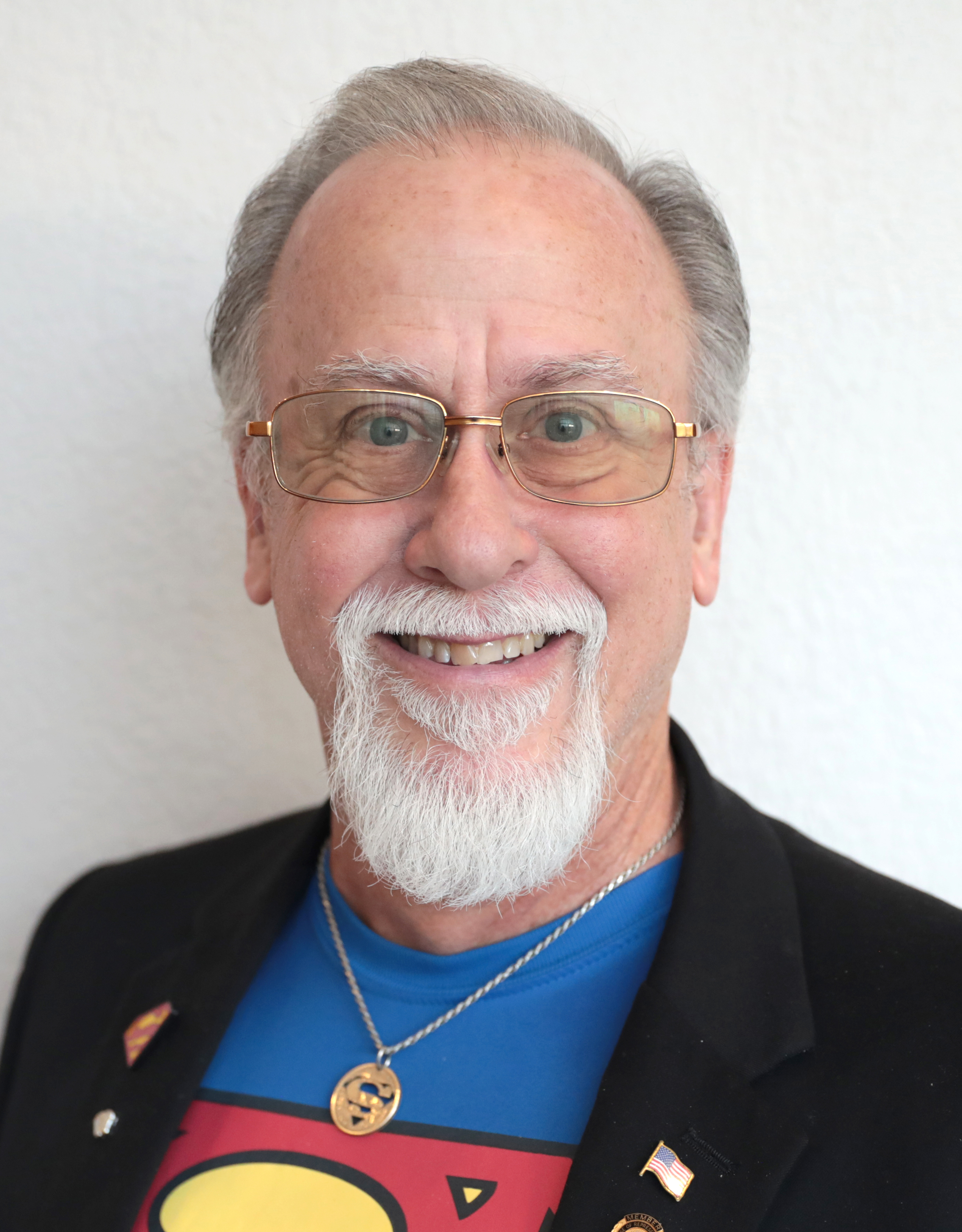
- Seitz at the 2022 Hazlitt Summit hosted by Young Americans for Liberty Foundation

Member of the Missouri House of Representatives from the 156th district
- Incumbent
- Assumed office January 6, 2021
- Preceded by: Jeffery Justus

Personal details
- Born: Michigan, U.S.
- Party: Republican
- Spouse: Valerie
- Children: 3
- Education: Missouri State University (BA)

Military service
- Branch/service: United States Army
- Years of service: 1983–1986

Brian H. Seitz is an American politician serving as a member of the Missouri House of Representatives from the 156th district, representing Branson, Missouri. Elected in November 2020, he assumed office on January 6, 2021.

== Early life and education ==
Seitz was born in Michigan. He earned a Bachelor of Arts degree in communications and public relations from Missouri State University in 1990.

== Career ==
From 1983 to 1986, Seitz served in the United States Army. He later managed Splash Carwash and was a pastor at Sovereign Grace Baptist Church and the First Baptist Church of Branson. Seitz was elected to the Missouri House of Representatives in November 2020 and assumed office on January 6, 2021.

In March 2022, Seitz introduced Missouri House Bill No. 2810, which garnered national attention for its ban on the use of abortion pills for ectopic pregnancies.

In April 2025, Seitz introduced a bill to repeal Amendment 3, which had been approved by voters the previous year. Seitz argued that his bill is not an abortion ban due to limited exceptions prior to 12 weeks. Reproductive health advocates describe the characterization as 'deceptive' and 'manipulation.'
