= Dirk Deaton =

American politician

Member of the Missouri House of Representatives from the 159th district
- In office January 2019 – August 9, 2026
- Preceded by: Bill Lant
- Succeeded by: Joel Mace (elect)

Personal details
- Born: 1994 (age 31–32) Noel, Missouri, U.S.
- Party: Republican
- Spouse: Nikki
- Education: Liberty University (BS)

Dirk E. Deaton (born 1994) is an American politician who served as a member of the Missouri House of Representatives from the 159th district. He assumed office in 2019.

== Early life and education ==
Deaton is a native of Noel, Missouri. He attended Crowder College and Missouri Southern State University before earning a Bachelor of Science degree in interdisciplinary studies from Liberty University.

== Career ==
Deaton was a member of the McDonald County Republican Club and co-founded the Noel Betterment Association. He was elected to the Missouri House of Representatives in 2018 and assumed office in 2019. Deaton also served as vice chair of the House Budget Committee and chair of the House Subcommittee on Appropriations for Health, Mental Health, and Social Services. He resigned from the chamber in August 2026.
