= Ben Harris (politician) =

American politician

Member of the Missouri House of Representatives from the 118th district
- In office 2011–2019
- Succeeded by: Mike McGirl

Personal details
- Born: October 20, 1976 (age 49) St. Louis, Missouri
- Party: Democratic
- Education: Jefferson College; Missouri Baptist College

Ben Harris is an American politician who is a former member of the Missouri House of Representatives, having served from 2011 to 2019. He is a Democrat.
