= Mike Jones (Missouri politician) =

American politician

Member of the Missouri House of Representatives from the 12th district
- Incumbent
- Assumed office January 8, 2025
- Preceded by: Jamie Johnson
- Succeeded by: Tracey Steele (elect)

Personal details
- Party: Republican
- Website: https://www.mikejones4mo.com/

Mike Jones is an American politician serving as a Republican member of the Missouri House of Representatives from the 12th district since 2025. The district covers part of Platte County, including Parkville, Platte Woods, Riverside, Houston Lake, and part of Kansas City. He defeated incumbent Democrat Jamie Johnson in 2024 by 179 votes. Jones is a candidate for the Missouri Senate's 34th district in the 2026 election.

== Early life and career ==
Jones is a native of Kansas City, Missouri. He graduated from Park Hill High School and earned a bachelor's degree in management and leadership from Friends University. He served in the United States Air Force from 1997 to 2001. Jones owns Elite Painting KC, a painting company based in Parkville.

== Legislative Career ==
During the 2026 session Jones served as the House handler for Senate Bill 1421, an omnibus public safety act sponsored by Senator Nick Schroer. The act established an automated expungement system under which eligible offenses are sealed as a matter of law, incorporating language from Senator Brian Williams's Senate Bill 854 and making Missouri the fourteenth state to adopt an automated record-sealing policy. Other provisions created the offense of masked intimidation, established a Missouri Rangers training program for school safety personnel, authorized school districts to install school bus safety cameras and increased penalties for failing to stop for a school bus, revised fentanyl and carfentanil trafficking thresholds, created offenses relating to damage to critical infrastructure and to gift card fraud, and transferred licensing of professional surety bail bond agents to a reconstituted state board.

The act also contained two separately named provisions. "Mason's Law" allows a Missouri resident whose health condition or disability impairs their ability to communicate with law enforcement to obtain a designation attached to their vehicle registration and recorded in the state law enforcement database. "Bentley and Mason's Law" permits a court to order a person convicted of an intoxication-related driving offense that killed a parent or guardian to pay child maintenance to the surviving children.

The House approved the conference committee substitute in May 2026, and Governor Mike Kehoe signed the bill in July. The automated expungement provisions take effect in January 2027.

== Committee Assignments (2025-26) ==
- Economic Development
- Emerging Issues
- Pensions
- Special Committee on Urban Issues
- Veterans and Armed Forces

Missouri House of Representatives Election, November 5, 2024, District 12
Party	Candidate	Votes	%	±%
Republican	Mike Jones	10,131	50.45	
Democratic	Jamie J. Johnson (incumbent)	9,952	49.55	
Total votes		20,083	100.00	
