= Doug Richey =

American politician

Member of the Missouri House of Representatives
- In office January 9, 2019 – January 8, 2025
- Preceded by: T.J. Berry
- Succeeded by: Mark Meirath
- Constituency: 38th district (2019–2023); 39th district (2023–2025)

Personal details
- Party: Republican

Doug Richey is a Missouri politician who was a member of the Missouri House of Representatives from 2019 to 2025. In his first two elections, he was elected from district 38, but redistricting in 2022 placed his home in district 39.

== Missouri House of Representatives ==
=== Committee assignments ===
- Joint Committee on Education – Chairman
- Federal Stimulus Appropriations Committee – Chairman
- Rules – Legislative Oversight – Vice Chairman
- Fiscal Review – Vice Chairman
- Budget
- Emerging Issues
- Subcommittee on Appropriations – Health, Mental Health and Social Services

=== Electoral history ===
2018 Missouri House of Representatives District 38 General Election
Party	Candidate	Votes	%	±%
Republican	Doug Richey	9,341	57.79%	
Democratic	Abby Zavos	6,823	42.21%	
Total votes		16,164	100.00%	

2020 Missouri House of Representatives District 38 General Election
Party	Candidate	Votes	%	±%
Republican	Doug Richey	16,385	100.00%	+42.21
Total votes		16,385	100.00%	

Missouri House of Representatives Election, November 8, 2022, District 39
Party	Candidate	Votes	%	±%
Republican	Doug Richey	11,120	100.00%	0.00
Total votes		11,120	100.00%	
