= Bill Lant =

American politician

Member of the Missouri House of Representatives from the 159th district
- In office 2011–2019
- Succeeded by: Dirk Deaton

Personal details
- Born: January 18, 1947 (age 79) Evansville, Indiana, U.S.
- Party: Republican
- Profession: Businessman

Bill Lant (born January 18, 1947) is an American politician. He was a member of the Missouri House of Representatives, having served since 2011. He is a member of the Republican party.
