= 2010 Missouri House of Representatives election =

Missouri House of Representatives elections, 2010
- November 2, 2010

163 seats in the Missouri House of Representatives 82 seats needed for a majority
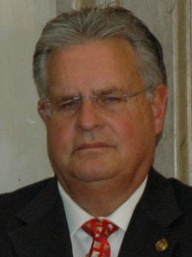

	Majority party	Minority party
Leader	Ron Richard (retired)	Paul LeVota
Party	Republican	Democratic
Leader's seat	129th-Joplin	52nd-Independence
Seats before	89	74
Seats after	106	57
Seat change	▲17	▼17
Popular vote	1,075,925	707,428
Percentage	59.28%	38.98%
- Results: Republican gain Republican hold Democratic hold
Speaker before election
Ron Richard
Republican
Elected Speaker
Steven Tilley
Republican

The 2010 elections for the Missouri House of Representatives were held on November 2, 2010, with all districts being contested. Necessary primary elections were held on August 3, 2010. The Republicans increased their majority in the chamber by 17 seats.

== Overall results ==
↓
106	57
Republican	Democratic

Results
Parties	Candidates	Seats				Popular Vote	
Parties	Candidates	2008	2010	+/-	Strength	Vote	%
Republican	134	89	106	▲17	65.0%	1,075,925	59.28%
Democratic	122	74	57	▼17	35.0%	707,428	38.98%
Constitution	18	-	-	-	-	12,414	0.68%
Libertarian	10	-	-	-	-	10,483	0.58%
Independent/Write-In	6	-	-	-	-	8,165	0.48%

== Predictions ==
Source	Ranking	As of
Governing	Safe R	November 1, 2010

== Results by district ==
District	Party	Incumbent	Status	Party	Candidate	Votes	%
1	Republican	Brian Munzlinger	Term-limited	Republican	Craig Redmon	7,467	60.9
1	Republican	Brian Munzlinger	Term-limited	Democratic	Keri Cottrell	4,796	39.1
2	Democratic	Rebecca McClanahan	Defeated	Republican	Zachary Wyatt	6,794	60.6
2	Democratic	Rebecca McClanahan	Defeated	Democratic	Rebecca McClanahan	4,423	39.4
3	Republican	Casey Guernsey	Re-elected	Republican	Casey Guernsey	10,213	100.0
4	Republican	Mike Thomson	Re-elected	Republican	Mike Thomson	9,442	83.0
4	Republican	Mike Thomson	Re-elected	Democratic	Robert Ritterbusch	1,934	17.0
5	Republican	Jim Guest	Term-limited	Republican	Glen Klippenstein	7,172	58.4
5	Republican	Jim Guest	Term-limited	Democratic	Judy Wright	4,672	38.1
5	Republican	Jim Guest	Term-limited	Constitution	Gary Murray	431	3.5
6	Democratic	Rachel Bringer	Term-limited	Republican	Lindell Shumake	6,564	57.3
6	Democratic	Rachel Bringer	Term-limited	Democratic	Carl Thompson	4,892	42.7
7	Republican	Mike Lair	Re-elected	Republican	Mike Lair	8,389	74.6
7	Republican	Mike Lair	Re-elected	Democratic	Dale Toms	2,858	25.4
8	Democratic	Tom Shively	Re-elected	Democratic	Tom Shively	7,444	59.5
8	Democratic	Tom Shively	Re-elected	Republican	William Foster	5,067	40.5
9	Democratic	Paul Quinn	Re-elected	Democratic	Paul Quinn	9,362	100.0
10	Democratic	Terry Witte	Term-limited	Republican	Jay Houghton	5,865	54.3
10	Democratic	Terry Witte	Term-limited	Democratic	Linda Witte	4,307	39.8
10	Democratic	Terry Witte	Term-limited	Libertarian	Josh Allum	638	5.9
11	Democratic	Ed Schieffer	Re-elected	Democratic	Ed Schieffer	8,259	55.9
11	Democratic	Ed Schieffer	Re-elected	Republican	Michael Clynch	6,527	44.1
12	Republican	Doug Funderburk	Re-elected	Republican	Doug Funderburk	9,800	67.4
12	Republican	Doug Funderburk	Re-elected	Democratic	Richard Trueba	4,744	32.6
13	Republican	Chuck Gatschenberger	Re-elected	Republican	Chuck Gatschenberger	16,214	67.7
13	Republican	Chuck Gatschenberger	Re-elected	Democratic	Vickie Boedeker	7,743	32.3
14	Republican	Joe Smith	Term-limited	Republican	Kathie Conway	8,886	66.2
14	Republican	Joe Smith	Term-limited	Democratic	Kyle Meadows	4,542	33.8
15	Republican	Sally Faith	Re-elected	Republican	Sally Faith	7,632	59.6
15	Republican	Sally Faith	Re-elected	Democratic	Paul Woody	4,404	34.4
15	Republican	Sally Faith	Re-elected	Libertarian	Bill Slantz	765	6.0
16	Republican	Mark Parkinson	Re-elected	Republican	Mark Parkinson	8,776	66.5
16	Republican	Mark Parkinson	Re-elected	Democratic	Debbie Bixler	4,414	33.5
17	Democratic	Kenny Biermann	Defeated	Republican	Vicki Schneider	8,104	55.7
17	Democratic	Kenny Biermann	Defeated	Democratic	Kenny Biermann	6,456	44.3
18	Republican	Anne Zerr	Re-elected	Republican	Anne Zerr	7,165	68.2
18	Republican	Anne Zerr	Re-elected	Democratic	Gary McKiddy	3,337	31.8
19	Republican	Cynthia Davis	Term-limited	Republican	Kurt Bahr	10,474	66.9
19	Republican	Cynthia Davis	Term-limited	Democratic	Matt Simmons	5,185	33.1
20	Republican	Jeanie Riddle	Re-elected	Republican	Jeanie Riddle	9,838	100.0
21	Republican	Steve Hobbs	Term-limited	Republican	John W. Cauthorn	7,133	58.7
21	Republican	Steve Hobbs	Term-limited	Democratic	Kelly Schultz	5,019	41.3
22	Republican	Therese Sander	Term-limited	Republican	Randy Asbury	7,813	69.8
22	Republican	Therese Sander	Term-limited	Democratic	Doug Galaske	3,380	30.2
23	Democratic	Stephen Webber	Re-elected	Democratic	Stephen Webber	9,373	68.0
23	Democratic	Stephen Webber	Re-elected	Republican	Paul Szopa	4,415	32.0
24	Democratic	Chris Kelly	Re-elected	Democratic	Chris Kelly	9,412	55.9
24	Democratic	Chris Kelly	Re-elected	Republican	Laura Nauser	7,426	44.1
25	Democratic	Mary Still	Re-elected	Democratic	Mary Still	5,975	100.0
26	Democratic	Joe Aull	Re-elected	Democratic	Joe Aull	9,271	100.0
27	Democratic	Pat Conway	Re-elected	Democratic	Pat Conway	4,922	60.5
27	Democratic	Pat Conway	Re-elected	Republican	Jason Gregory	3,211	39.5
28	Republican	Rob Schaaf	Term-limited	Republican	Delus Johnson	7,967	63.4
28	Republican	Rob Schaaf	Term-limited	Democratic	Mark Sheehan	4,609	36.6
29	Democratic	Martin T. Rucker	Retired	Republican	Galen Higdon	6,942	64.0
29	Democratic	Martin T. Rucker	Retired	Democratic	Bill Caldwell	3,908	36.0
30	Republican	Jason Brown	Term-limited	Republican	Nick Marshall	8,888	59.5
30	Republican	Jason Brown	Term-limited	Democratic	Lexi Norris	6,044	40.5
31	Democratic	Trent Skaggs	Term-limited	Democratic	Jay Swearingen	4,669	51.3
31	Democratic	Trent Skaggs	Term-limited	Republican	Matthew Thompson	4,437	48.7
32	Democratic	Jason Grill	Defeated	Republican	Ron Schieber	7,441	50.6
32	Democratic	Jason Grill	Defeated	Democratic	Jason Grill	7,267	49.4
33	Republican	Jerry Nolte	Re-elected	Republican	Jerry Nolte	7,853	65.1
33	Republican	Jerry Nolte	Re-elected	Democratic	Jim Stoufer	4,204	34.9
34	Republican	Tim Flook	Retired	Republican	Myron Neth	6,551	54.6
34	Republican	Tim Flook	Retired	Democratic	Mark Ellebracht	5,457	45.4
35	Republican	Doug Ervin	Term-limited	Republican	T. J. Berry	13,656	69.5
35	Republican	Doug Ervin	Term-limited	Democratic	Jim Baldwin	5,997	30.5
36	Republican	Bob Nance	Re-elected	Republican	Bob Nance	7,160	66.1
36	Republican	Bob Nance	Re-elected	Democratic	Barbara Lanning	3,680	33.9
37	Democratic	Mike Talboy	Re-elected	Democratic	Mike Talboy	6,785	100.0
38	Republican	Ryan Silvey	Re-elected	Republican	Ryan Silvey	9,133	69.7
38	Republican	Ryan Silvey	Re-elected	Democratic	Debbie Colozza	3,979	30.3
39	Democratic	Beth Low	Retired	Democratic	Jean Peters-Baker	8,314	100.0
40	Democratic	John Burnett	Term-limited	Democratic	John Rizzo	8,314	100.0
40	Democratic	John Burnett	Term-limited	Libertarian	Sean O'Toole	8,314	100.0
41	Democratic	Kiki Curls	Re-elected	Democratic	Kiki Curls	5,002	100.0
42	Democratic	Leonard Hughes IV	Re-elected	Democratic	Leonard Hughes IV'	7,441	100.0
43	Democratic	Roman Lee LeBlanc	Retired	Democratic	Gail Beatty	7,621	100.0
44	Democratic	Jason Kander	Re-elected	Democratic	Jason Kander	8,922	69.6
44	Democratic	Jason Kander	Re-elected	Republican	Sally Miller	3,892	30.4
45	Democratic	Jason R. Holsman	Re-elected	Democratic	Jason R. Holsman	6,595	60.3
45	Democratic	Jason R. Holsman	Re-elected	Republican	Nola Wood	4,348	39.7
46	Democratic	Kate Meiners	Term-limited	Democratic	Kevin McManus	8,418	62.5
46	Democratic	Kate Meiners	Term-limited	Republican	Rodney Williams	5,044	37.5
47	Republican	Jeff Grisamore	Re-elected	Republican	Jeff Grisamore	10,984	100.0
48	Republican	Will Kraus	Retired	Republican	Gary Cross	6,882	53.0
48	Republican	Will Kraus	Retired	Democratic	Gavin Fletchall	5,769	44.4
48	Republican	Will Kraus	Retired	Libertarian	Nathan Eaton	339	2.6
49	Democratic	Tom McDonald	Re-elected	Democratic	Tom McDonald	7,350	100.0
50	Democratic	Michael Brown	Re-elected	Democratic	Michael Brown	7,484	100.0
51	Democratic	Ray Salva	Term-limited	Democratic	Ira Anders	3,683	52.8
51	Democratic	Ray Salva	Term-limited	Republican	Jeff Workman	2,765	39.7
51	Democratic	Ray Salva	Term-limited	Libertarian	Kevin Kobe	281	4.0
51	Democratic	Ray Salva	Term-limited	Constitution	Michael Cogan	243	3.5
52	Democratic	Paul LeVota	Term-limited	Republican	Noel Torpey	8,123	60.6
52	Democratic	Paul LeVota	Term-limited	Democratic	Robbie Makinen	5,290	39.4
53	Democratic	Curt Dougherty	Term-limited	Republican	Brent Lasater	5,291	55.7
53	Democratic	Curt Dougherty	Term-limited	Democratic	Diane Egger	4,214	44.3
54	Republican	Gary Dusenberg	Term-limited	Republican	Jeanie Lauer	8,738	63.9
54	Republican	Gary Dusenberg	Term-limited	Democratic	John Bullard	4,926	36.1
55	Republican	Bryan Pratt	Term-limited	Republican	Sheila Solon	7,744	61.6
55	Republican	Bryan Pratt	Term-limited	Democratic	Clay Rogers	4,251	33.8
55	Republican	Bryan Pratt	Term-limited	Libertarian	Jeffrey Hoorfar	570	44.5
56	Republican	Brian Yates	Term-limited	Republican	Mike Cierpiot	10,370	63.4
56	Republican	Brian Yates	Term-limited	Democratic	Dave Coffman	5,986	36.6
57	Democratic	Hope Whitehead	Defeated in primary	Democratic	Karla May	7,385	100.0
58	Democratic	James Morris	Defeated in primary	Democratic	Penny Hubbard	7,383	100.0
59	Democratic	Jeanette Mott Oxford	Re-elected	Democratic	Jeanette Mott Oxford	6,133	100.0
60	Democratic	Jamilah Nasheed	Re-elected	Democratic	Jamilah Nasheed	8,023	100.0
61	Democratic	Chris Carter	Re-elected	Democratic	Chris Carter	7,804	100.0
62	Republican	Nita Jane Ayres	Defeated in primary	Republican	Don Phillips	12,348	100.0
63	Democratic	Tishaura Jones	Re-elected	Democratic	Tishaura Jones	8,242	100.0
64	Democratic	Rachel Storch	Retired	Democratic	Susan Carlson	7,210	76.7
64	Democratic	Rachel Storch	Retired	Republican	Patricia Verde	2,005	21.3
64	Democratic	Rachel Storch	Retired	Constitution	Mark Opheim	188	2.0
65	Democratic	Michele Kratky	Re-elected	Democratic	Michele Kratky	9,309	100.0
66	Democratic	Michael Vogt	Term-limited	Democratic	Genise Montecillo	5,687	59.8
66	Democratic	Michael Vogt	Term-limited	Republican	Bill Hartzog	3,816	40.2
67	Democratic	Michael Colona	Re-elected	Democratic	Michael Colona	6,260	82.0
67	Democratic	Michael Colona	Re-elected	Republican	Curtis Farber	1,370	18.0
68	Republican	David Sater	Re-elected	Republican	David Sater	9,364	100.0
69	Democratic	Gina Walsh	Term-limited	Democratic	Tommie Pierson	6,261	77.5
69	Democratic	Gina Walsh	Term-limited	Independent	Yolanda Austin	1,820	22.5
70	Democratic	Sharon Pace	Re-elected	Democratic	Sharon Pace	8,287	100.0
71	Democratic	Don Calloway	Ran for state senate	Democratic	Clem Smith	8,050	100.0
72	Democratic	Maria Chappelle-Nadal	Ran for state senate	Democratic	Rory Ellinger	9,744	94.2
72	Democratic	Maria Chappelle-Nadal	Ran for state senate	Write-In	Marva Miller	598	5.8
73	Democratic	Stacey Newman	Re-elected	Democratic	Stacey Newman	7,728	61.4
73	Democratic	Stacey Newman	Re-elected	Republican	Daniel O'Sullivan	4,851	38.6
74	Democratic	Steve Webb	Re-elected	Democratic	Steve Webb	10,557	74.5
74	Democratic	Steve Webb	Re-elected	Republican	David Blanke	3,616	38.6
75	Democratic	Bert Atkins	Re-elected	Democratic	Bert Atkins	6,864	62.6
75	Democratic	Bert Atkins	Re-elected	Republican	Bryan Koen	4,108	37.4
76	Democratic	Michael Spreng	Re-elected	Democratic	Michael Spreng	7,668	100.0
77	Democratic	Michael George Corcoran	Term-limited	Democratic	Eileen Grant McGeoghegan	5,107	62.5
77	Democratic	Michael George Corcoran	Term-limited	Republican	Linda Ragsdale	3,060	37.5
78	Democratic	Margo McNeil	Re-elected	Democratic	Margo McNeil	5,864	59.2
78	Democratic	Margo McNeil	Re-elected	Republican	Glen Lindemann	4,034	40.8
79	Democratic	Albert Joseph Liese	Re-elected	Democratic	Mary Nichols	6,010	51.7
79	Democratic	Albert Joseph Liese	Re-elected	Republican	Dan Johnson	5,912	44.6
79	Democratic	Albert Joseph Liese	Re-elected	Constitution	William R. Spaits	433	3.7
80	Democratic	Theodore Hoskins	Term-limited	Democratic	Sylvester Taylor II	10,095	100.0
81	Democratic	Rochelle Walton Gray	Re-elected	Democratic	Rochelle Walton Gray	9,938	100.0
82	Democratic	Jill Schupp	Re-elected	Democratic	Jill Schupp	9,947	100.0
83	Democratic	Jake Zimmerman	Re-elected	Democratic	Jake Zimmerman	7,435	65.3
83	Democratic	Jake Zimmerman	Re-elected	Republican	Patrick J. Brennan	3,947	34.7
84	Republican	Allen Icet	Ran for state auditor	Republican	Don Gosen	12,571	100.0
85	Democratic	Vicki Englund	Defeated	Republican	Cloria Brown	6,482	52.7
85	Democratic	Vicki Englund	Defeated	Democratic	Vicki Englund	5,824	47.3
86	Republican	Cole McNary	Re-elected	Republican	Cole McNary	11,809	100.0
87	Republican	John Diehl	Re-elected	Republican	John Diehl	12,479	100.0
88	Republican	Andrew Koenig	Re-elected	Republican	Andrew Koenig	10,582	100.0
89	Republican	Tim Jones	Re-elected	Republican	Tim Jones	12,190	100.0
90	Democratic	Sam Komo	Defeated	Republican	John McCaherty	4,980	49.1
90	Democratic	Sam Komo	Defeated	Democratic	Sam Komo	4,727	46.6
90	Democratic	Sam Komo	Defeated	Independent	Charles Smith II	438	4.3
91	Democratic	Jeanne Kirkton	Re-elected	Democratic	Jeanne Kirkton	8,103	51.3
91	Democratic	Jeanne Kirkton	Re-elected	Republican	Rich Magee	7,418	47.0
91	Democratic	Jeanne Kirkton	Re-elected	Libertarian	Martin Hague	260	1.6
92	Republican	Sue Allen	Re-elected	Republican	Sue Allen	10,499	100.0
93	Republican	Dwight Scharnhorst	Re-elected	Republican	Dwight Scharnhorst	10,719	100.0
94	Republican	Rick Stream	Re-elected	Republican	Rick Stream	9,326	56.2
94	Republican	Rick Stream	Re-elected	Democratic	Deb Lavender	7,267	43.8
95	Republican	Mike Leara	Re-elected	Republican	Mike Leara	9,870	62.9
95	Republican	Mike Leara	Re-elected	Democratic	Alice Geary Sgroi	5,385	34.3
95	Republican	Mike Leara	Re-elected	Constitution	Steven Newton	427	2.7
96	Democratic	Patricia M. Yaeger	Term-limited	Democratic	Scott Sifton	5,655	58.2
96	Democratic	Patricia M. Yaeger	Term-limited	Republican	Anthony Leech	4,062	41.8
97	Republican	Mike Leara	Term-limited	Republican	Gary Fuhr	9,072	63.1
97	Republican	Mike Leara	Term-limited	Democratic	Jan Polizzi	4,880	33.9
97	Republican	Mike Leara	Term-limited	Constitution	Daniel P. Fitzhenry	427	3.0
98	Republican	Brian Nieves	Ran for state senate	Republican	Dave Hinson	7,050	60.5
98	Republican	Brian Nieves	Ran for state senate	Democratic	Mary Jo Straatmann	4,603	39.5
99	Republican	Mike Sutherland	Term-limited	Republican	Bart Korman	12,030	100.0
100	Democratic	Sue Schoemehl	Term-limited	Republican	Marsha Haefner	9,593	64.3
100	Democratic	Sue Schoemehl	Term-limited	Democratic	Andrew Spavale	5,072	34.0
100	Democratic	Sue Schoemehl	Term-limited	Constitution	Randy Lewis	256	1.7

== Notes ==
1.5 candidates ran as independents. In District 72, Marva Miller received 598 write-in votes, making her the sixth.
