= 2014 St. Charles County Executive election =

- November 4, 2014

Nominee	Steve Ehlmann	Rodney Zerr
Party	Republican	Democratic
Popular vote	63,625	29,985
Percentage	67.86%	31.98%
County Executive before election
Steve Ehlmann
Republican
Elected County Executive
Steve Ehlmann
Republican

The 2014 St. Charles County Executive election took place on November 4, 2014. Incumbent Republican County Executive Steve Ehlmann ran for re-election to a third term. He initially faced a challenge in the Republican primary from State Representative Doug Funderburk, but Funderburk withdrew from the race, citing family concerns. Ehlmann won the Republican primary and faced Rodney Zerr, the county's former Director of Emergency Management, in the general election. Ehlmann defeated Zerr by a wide margin, winning his third term with 68 percent of the vote.

== Democratic primary ==
=== Candidates ===
- Rodney Zerr, former County Director of Emergency Management

=== Results ===
Democratic primary results
Party	Candidate	Votes	%
Democratic	Rodney Zerr	11,387	100.00%
Total votes		11,387	100.00%

== Republican primary ==
=== Candidates ===
- Steve Ehlmann, incumbent County Executive
- Doug Funderburk, State Representative (dropped out)

=== Results ===
Republican primary results
Party	Candidate	Votes	%
Republican	Steve Ehlmann (inc.)	29,363	78.24%
Republican	Doug Funderburk	8,168	21.76%
Total votes		37,531	100.00%

== General election ==
=== Results ===
2014 St. Charles County Executive election
Party	Candidate	Votes	%
Republican	Steve Ehlmann (inc.)	63,625	67.86%
Democratic	Rodney Zerr	29,985	31.98%
Write-in		144	0.15%
Total votes		93,754	100.00%
Republican hold			
