= 2018 St. Charles County Executive election =

- November 6, 2018

Nominee	Steve Ehlmann	Lorna Frahm
Party	Republican	Democratic
Popular vote	104,258	63,550
Percentage	62.06%	37.83%
County Executive before election
Steve Ehlmann
Republican
Elected County Executive
Steve Ehlmann
Republican

The 2018 St. Charles County Executive election took place on November 6, 2018. Incumbent Republican County Executive Steve Ehlmann ran for re-election to a fourth term. He won the Republican primary unopposed and faced St. Peters Prosecuting Attorney Lorna Frahm, the Democratic nominee, in the general election. Ehlmann defeated Frahm by a wide margin, winning re-election with 62 percent of the vote.

== Democratic primary ==
=== Candidates ===
- Lorna Frahm, St. Peters Prosecuting Attorney

=== Results ===
Democratic primary results
Party	Candidate	Votes	%
Democratic	Lorna Frahm	34,312	100.00%
Total votes		34,312	100.00%

== Republican primary ==
=== Candidates ===
- Steve Ehlmann, incumbent County Executive

=== Results ===
Republican primary results
Party	Candidate	Votes	%
Republican	Steve Ehlmann (inc.)	40,794	100.00%
Total votes		40,794	100.00%

== General election ==
=== Results ===
2018 St. Charles County Executive election
Party	Candidate	Votes	%
Republican	Steve Ehlmann (inc.)	104,258	62.06%
Democratic	Lorna Frahm	63,550	37.83%
Write-in		192	0.11%
Total votes		168,000	100.00%
Republican hold			
