= Meiners =

Meiners is a surname. Notable people with the surname include:

- Christoph Meiners (1747–1810), German philosopher and historian
- Danny Meiners (born 1979), German politician
- Ernst Meiners (1893–1959), German Wehrmacht general
- Kate Meiners (born 1958), American politician
- Maarten Meiners (born 1992), Dutch alpine skier
- Terry Meiners (born 1957), American radio and television personality
- William Meiners (born 1965), Book Publisher, Writer and Teacher

== See also ==
- Meiners Oaks, California
