= 2022 St. Charles County Executive election =

- November 8, 2022
Nominee	Steve Ehlmann
Party	Republican
Popular vote	110,601
Percentage	96.10%
County Executive before election
Steve Ehlmann
Republican
Elected County Executive
Steve Ehlmann
Republican

The 2022 St. Charles County Executive election took place on November 8, 2022. Incumbent Republican County Executive Steve Ehlmann ran for re-election to a fifth term. State Senator Bob Onder announced that he would challenge Ehlmann in the Republican primary, but ultimately dropped out of the race. Ehlmann ultimately faced perennial candidate Arnie Dienoff in the Republican primary, and defeated him in a landslide, winning 82 percent of the vote. In the general election, Ehlmann faced no opposition and won his fifth term unopposed.

== Republican primary ==
=== Candidates ===
- Steve Ehlmann, incumbent County Executive
- Arnie Dienoff, perennial candidate

==== Dropped out ====
- Bob Onder, State Senator

=== Results ===
Republican primary results
Party	Candidate	Votes	%
Republican	Steve Ehlmann (inc.)	34,640	82.48%
Republican	Arnie Dienoff	7,356	17.52%
Total votes		41,996	100.00%

== General election ==
=== Results ===
2022 St. Charles County Executive election
Party	Candidate	Votes	%
Republican	Steve Ehlmann (inc.)	110,601	96.10%
Write-in		4,488	3.90%
Total votes		115,089	100.00%
Republican hold			
