= Ron Schieber =

American politician

Member of the Missouri House of Representatives from the 14th district
- In office January 9, 2013 – January 7, 2015
- Preceded by: Kathie Conway
- Succeeded by: Kevin Corlew

Member of the Missouri House of Representatives from the 32nd district
- In office January 5, 2011 – January 9, 2013
- Preceded by: Jason Grill
- Succeeded by: Jeanie Lauer

Personal details
- Born: April 3, 1960 (age 66) Maryville, Missouri
- Party: Republican

Ron Schieber (born April 3, 1960) is an American politician who served in the Missouri House of Representatives from 2011 to 2015.
