= 2006 St. Charles County Executive election =

- November 7, 2006

Nominee	Steve Ehlmann	Jim Rutherford
Party	Republican	Democratic
Popular vote	75,336	49,728
Percentage	60.21%	39.75%
County Executive before election
Joe Ortwerth
Republican
Elected County Executive
Steve Ehlmann
Republican

The 2006 St. Charles County Executive election took place on November 7, 2006. Incumbent County Executive Joe Ortweth declined to seek re-election. Former State Senator Steve Ehlmann, the County's Director of Administration, won the Republican primary unopposed and faced marketing manager Jim Rutherford, the Democratic nominee, in the general election.

The St. Louis Post-Dispatch endorsed Ehlmann over Rutherford, praising his "experience and temperament" and his promise of "a gentler, less combative administration." Though it praised Rutherford's policy goals, the paper noted that "he cannot equal Mr. Ehlmann's breadth of experience."

Ehlmann defeated Rutherford by a wide margin, winning 60 percent of the vote to Rutherford's 40 percent.

== Democratic primary ==
=== Candidates ===
- Jim Rutherford, marketing manager

=== Results ===
Democratic primary results
Party	Candidate	Votes	%
Democratic	Jim Rutherford	9,681	100.00%
Total votes		9,681	100.00%

== Republican primary ==
=== Candidates ===
- Steve Ehlmann, County Director of Administration, former State Senator

=== Results ===
Republican primary results
Party	Candidate	Votes	%
Republican	Steve Ehlmann	19,376	100.00%
Total votes		19,376	100.00%

== General election ==
=== Results ===
2006 St. Charles County Executive election
Party	Candidate	Votes	%
Republican	Steve Ehlmann	75,336	60.21%
Democratic	Jim Rutherford	49,728	39.75%
Write-in		53	0.04%
Total votes		125,117	100.00%
Republican hold			
