= Wildberger =

Wildberger is a surname. Notable people with the surname include:

- Ed Wildberger, Missouri politician
- Jacques Wildberger, Swiss composer
- Norman J. Wildberger, mathematician known for rational trigonometry
- Tina Wildberger, Hawaii politician
