= Schoemehl (surname) =

Schoemehl is a surname. Notable people with the surname include:

- Sue Schoemehl, American politician and Missouri state representative
- Vincent C. Schoemehl, American politician and mayor of St. Louis, Missouri

== See also ==
- Schlemiel
