= American State Legislators for Gun Violence Prevention =

American organization

- Formation: December 8, 2014; 11 years ago
- Purpose: Gun violence reduction
- Members: About 200
- Key people: Brian Kavanagh
- Website: www.aslgvp.org

American State Legislators for Gun Violence Prevention (ASLGVP) is a United States non-partisan coalition of state lawmakers to promote gun control in order to reduce gun violence. It was founded by Senator Brian P. Kavanagh (D-NY). The other legislators who joined Kavanagh at the Washington, D.C., press conference to announce the formation of the group were: Representative Barbara Bollier (R-KS); Senator José R. Rodriguez (D-TX); Representative Renny Cushing (D-NH); Representative Merika Coleman-Evans (D-AL); Representative Stacey Newman (D-MO); and Senator Adam Ebbin (D-VA).
