= 2010 St. Charles County Executive election =

- November 2, 2010
Nominee	Steve Ehlmann
Party	Republican
Popular vote	96,194
Percentage	98.58%
County Executive before election
Steve Ehlmann
Republican
Elected County Executive
Steve Ehlmann
Republican

The 2010 St. Charles County Executive election took place on November 2, 2010. Incumbent County Executive Steve Ehlmann ran for re-election to a second term. He defeated retired autoworker Charles Davis in the Republican primary, receiving 78 percent of the vote. In the general election, he faced no opposition and won his second term uncontested.

== Republican primary ==
=== Candidates ===
- Steve Ehlmann, incumbent County Executive
- Charles Davis, retired autoworker

=== Results ===
Republican primary results
Party	Candidate	Votes	%
Republican	Steve Ehlmann (inc.)	27,865	77.50%
Republican	Charles Davis	8,090	22.50%
Total votes		35,955	100.00%

== General election ==
=== Results ===
2010 St. Charles County Executive election
Party	Candidate	Votes	%
Republican	Steve Ehlmann (inc.)	96,194	98.58%
Write-in		1,384	1.42%
Total votes		97,578	100.00%
Republican hold			
