= 2026 St. Charles County Executive election =

Local election in Missouri, US

- November 3, 2026
Incumbent County Executive
Steve Ehlmann
Republican

The 2026 St. Charles County Executive election was held on November 3, 2026, following party primaries on August 4, 2026. Incumbent County Executive Steve Ehlmann, who has served in the position since 2007, announced in June 2023 that he would not seek a sixth term, but stated in August 2025 that he was reconsidering the decision, and announced in October 2025 that he would run for re-election.

== Republican primary ==
=== Candidates ===
==== Declared ====
- Steve Ehlmann, incumbent County Executive (previously declined)
- Bill Eigel, former state senator and candidate for governor in 2024
- Jason Law, Mayor of Lake St. Louis
- Arnie "AC" Deinoff, perennial candidate

==== Withdrawn ====
- Mike Elam, Chairman of the County Council (running for re-election, endorsed Ehlmann)

==== Declined ====
- Nick Guccione, Mayor of Wentzville (endorsed Ehlmann)

=== Polling ===
Hypothetical polling

Poll source	Date(s) administered	Sample size (Note: Key: A – all adults RV – registered voters LV – likely voters V – unclear)	Margin of error	Bill Eigel	Mike Elam	Nick Guccione	Jason Law	Undecided
Survey Missouri	August 19 & 25, 2025	335 (RV)	± 3.5%	39%	7%	11%	9%	34%
Survey Missouri	April 22–23, 2025	408 (RV)	± 3.2%	40%	10%	11.7%	1.7%	36.7%

=== Debate ===
2026 St. Charles County Executive Republican primary debate
No.	Date	Host	Moderator	Link	Republican	Republican	Republican
Key: P Participant A Absent N Not invited I Invited W Withdrawn							
Key: P Participant A Absent N Not invited I Invited W Withdrawn					Steve Ehlmann	Bill Eigel	Jason Law
1	Jun. 2, 2026	Lindenwood University	Jamie Allman	YouTube	P	P	P

== Democratic primary ==
=== Nominee ===
- David Veneziano

== General election ==
=== Results ===
2026 St. Charles County Executive election
Party	Candidate	Votes	%
Republican	Steve Ehlmann	89,440	55.98%
Democratic	David Veneziano	70,335	44.02%
Total votes		159,775	100%
