= Fuhr =

Fuhr is a surname. Notable people with the surname include:

- Gary Fuhr (born 1947), American politician
- Grant Fuhr (born 1962), Canadian ice hockey player
- Heather Fuhr (born 1968), Canadian triathlete
- John Fuhr (1928–2017), American politician
- Leo Fuhr Hjelde (born 2003), Norwegian footballer
- Lina Fuhr (1828–1906), German actress
- Melchior Schjelderup Olsson Fuhr (1790–1869), Norwegian politician
- Norbert Fuhr (born 1956), German computer scientist
- Oscar Fuhr (1893–1975), American baseball player
- Stephen Fuhr (born 1969), Canadian politician
- Susanne Fuhr (born 1953), Norwegian jazz vocalist
