= Gary Kelly =

Gary Kelly may refer to:

- Gary C. Kelly (born 1955), Chairman and former CEO of Southwest Airlines
- Gary Kelly (footballer, born 1966), Irish football goalkeeper
- Gary Kelly (footballer, born 1974), Irish footballer
- Gary Kelly (bowls) (born 1989), Northern Irish bowls player
- Gary Kelly (politician) (born 1962), American politician from Missouri

== See also ==
- Garry Kelly (1948–2002), Australian politician
