= Cindy Ostmann =

American politician (1938–2019)

Member of the Missouri House of Representatives from the 14th district
- In office January 6, 1993 – January 8, 2003
- Preceded by: Sam Leake
- Succeeded by: Joe Smith

Personal details
- Born: December 9, 1938 Wellston, Missouri
- Died: March 9, 2019 (aged 80) St. Peters, Missouri
- Party: Republican

Cindy Ostmann (December 9, 1938 – March 9, 2019) was an American Republican politician who served in the Missouri House of Representatives from 1993 to 2003.

Born in St. Louis County, Missouri, Ostmann graduated from Lindenwood College with a bachelor's degree in education in 1963. She taught in the Fort Zumwalt School District and served on the Fort Zumwalt board of education. The St. Charles County Republican has also held a Missouri real estate license and has been an owner and manager of residential properties.

She died on March 9, 2019, in St. Peters, Missouri at age 80.
