= DaRon McGee =

American politician

Member of Jackson County Legislature
- In office January 1, 2022 – December 31, 2026
- Preceded by: Dan Tarwater

Member of the Missouri House of Representatives from the 36th district
- In office 2015 – January 8, 2020
- Preceded by: Kevin McManus
- Succeeded by: Mark Sharp

Personal details
- Born: Kansas City, Missouri
- Party: Democratic

DaRon McGee is an American politician who served in the Missouri House of Representatives from the 36th district from 2016 until 2019, when he resigned amid sexual harassment allegations. In 2022 he was elected to the Jackson County Legislature representing the 4th district.

McGee was elected to Missouri House of Representatives in 2015, where he served until his resignation in 2019. McGee was later elected unopposed to the Jackson County Legislature in November 2022. As a legislator, McGee was appointed as Chairman of the Jackson County Legislature both in 2023 and 2025. McGee lost his position as chairman of the legislature in 2026 to Manny Abarca who is the current chairman.

In 2025, McGee applied to fill out the remainder of former County Executive Frank White's term after he was recalled. However, the county legislature instead gave the position to Phil LeVota. In 2026 McGee ran for County Executive but later dropped out of the race, citing desires to be with his family.
