= Rodger Fitzwater =

American politician

Member of the Missouri House of Representatives from the 36th district
- In office January 4, 1995 – January 3, 2001
- Preceded by: Norwood Creason
- Succeeded by: Gary Kelly

Personal details
- Born: January 15, 1962 (age 64) Richmond, Missouri, U.S.
- Party: Democratic

Rodger Fitzwater (born January 15, 1962) is an American politician who served in the Missouri House of Representatives from the 36th district from 1995 to 2001.
