= Karissa Varga =

American politician

Member-elect of the Missouri House of Representatives from the 37th district
- Assuming office January 2027
- Succeeding: Mark Sharp

Personal details
- Party: Democratic

Karissa Varga is an American politician. A member of the Democratic Party, she is the member-elect for the 37th district of the Missouri House of Representatives.
