= Mark Ellebracht =

American politician

Member of the Missouri House of Representatives from the 17th district
- In office January 4, 2017 – January 4, 2023
- Preceded by: Nick King
- Succeeded by: Bill Allen

Personal details
- Born: March 31, 1981 (age 45)
- Party: Democratic

Mark Ellebracht (born March 31, 1981) is an American politician who served in the Missouri House of Representatives from the 17th district from 2017 to 2023.

== Electoral history ==
=== State representative ===
Missouri House of Representatives Election, November 2, 2010, District 34
Party	Candidate	Votes	%	±%
Democratic	Mark Ellebracht	5,457	45.44%	+6.76
Republican	Myron Neth	6,551	54.56%	−6.76

Missouri House of Representatives Election, November 6, 2012, District 17
Party	Candidate	Votes	%	±%
Democratic	Mark Ellebracht	8,500	49.38%	+3.94
Republican	Myron Neth	8,713	50.62%	−3.94

Missouri House of Representatives Election, November 4, 2014, District 17
Party	Candidate	Votes	%	±%
Democratic	Mark Ellebracht	4,504	49.60%	+0.22
Republican	S. Nick King	4,576	50.40%	−0.22

Missouri House of Representatives Election, November 8, 2016, District 17
Party	Candidate	Votes	%	±%
Democratic	Mark Ellebracht	8,979	50.52%	+0.92
Republican	Mary Hill	8,146	45.83%	−4.57
Libertarian	Erik S. Buck	649	3.65%	+3.65

Missouri House of Representatives Election, November 6, 2018, District 17
Party	Candidate	Votes	%	±%
Democratic	Mark Ellebracht	8,649	56.67%	+6.15
Republican	Mary Hill	6,612	43.33%	−2.50
