= Mike Revis =

American politician

Member of the Missouri House of Representatives from the 97th district
- In office 2018 – January 9, 2019
- Preceded by: John McCaherty
- Succeeded by: Mary Elizabeth Coleman

Personal details
- Party: Democratic
- Education: University of Missouri (BA)

Mike Revis is an American politician who served as a Democratic member of the Missouri House of Representatives for the 97th district from 2018 to 2019. He was defeated for reelection to a full term in the 2018 general election.

== Background ==
Revis graduated from Rockwood Summit High School and worked for Anheuser-Busch InBev as a purchasing manager. He also was an intern for Governor Jay Nixon.

On February 6, 2018, Revis won a special election to succeed John McCaherty (R), who resigned as state representative for District 97.
