= Melesa Johnson =

American politician (born 1989)

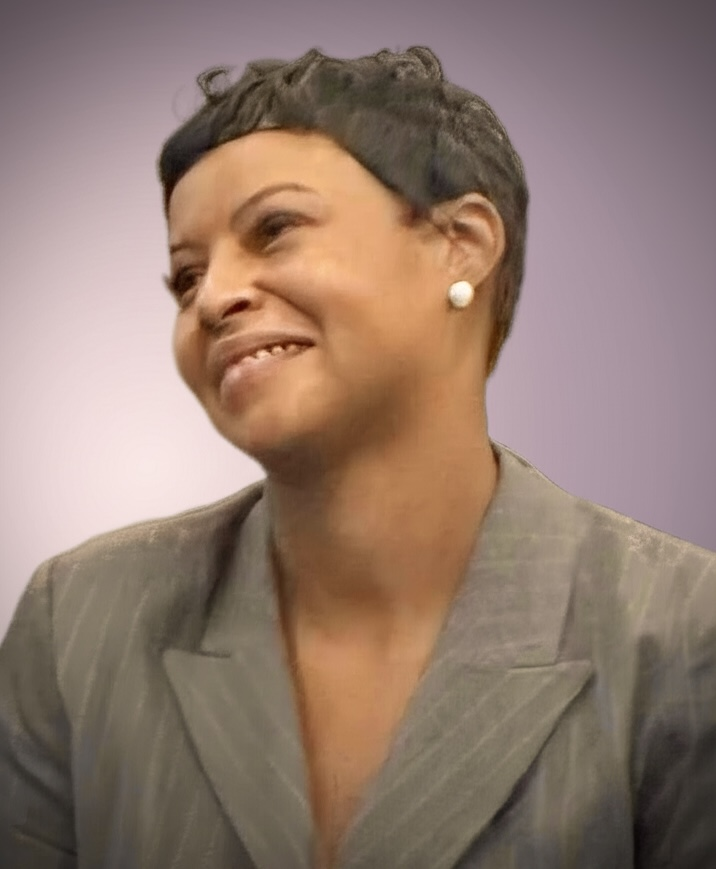
- Johnson in 2024

Jackson County Prosecutor
- Incumbent
- Assumed office January 3, 2025
- Preceded by: Jean Peters-Baker

Director of Public Safety of Kansas City, Missouri
- In office 2023 – January 2, 2025

Personal details
- Born: October 7, 1989 (age 36)
- Party: Democratic
- Education: Columbia University (BA); University of Missouri School of Law (JD)
- Occupation: Attorney; Politician
- Website: jacksoncountyprosecutor.com

Melesa Johnson (born October 7, 1989) is an American attorney and politician serving as the Jackson County prosecutor. She is the first Black person to hold the office, and is a member of the Democratic Party.

Johnson was raised in Kansas City and began her career as an assistant prosecutor in Jackson County. She moved to private practice and became a law clerk in the United States District Court for the Western District of Missouri. In 2023, Mayor Quinton Lucas appointed her director of public safety for Kansas City, where she managed violence prevention programs.

She was elected Jackson County prosecutor in November 2024 and took office in January 2025. Key policy initiatives immediately included creating a dedicated property crimes unit and implementing a new policy to more aggressively prosecute felony domestic violence cases at the county level, rather than in municipal courts.

== Early life and education ==
Johnson was raised in Kansas City, Missouri, in the Oak Park neighborhood, which she has described as being challenged by crime. She has spoken about firsthand experiences with violent crime impacting her upbringing.

Johnson graduated from Columbia University with a Bachelor of Arts in political science, having pursued African-American studies and athletics such as hurdling. She earned a J.D. from the University of Missouri School of Law, where she was an associate editor of the Missouri Law Review.

== Career ==
Johnson's legal career began in 2014 as an Assistant Prosecutor in the Jackson County Prosecutor's Office, where she was named "Rookie of the Year". She moved to private practice at the law firms Baker Sterchi Cowden & Rice, LLC, and Seyferth Blumenthal & Harris. She also was a law clerk for United States Magistrate Judge Willie J. Epps Jr., in the United States District Court for the Western District of Missouri and worked in the congressional office of Emanuel Cleaver.

=== Director of Public Safety ===
Johnson was appointed Director of Public Safety for Kansas City by Mayor Quinton Lucas in 2023. In this role, she managed key violence prevention initiatives, led the "Partners for Peace" program, and was involved in collaborative efforts with the Kansas City Police Department (KCPD) and the Prosecutor's Office to create SAVE KC, a focused deterrence program for reducing gun violence. Her role with SAVE KC included participating in weekly KCPD discussions to analyze shooting incidents. She was a liaison between City Hall and the KCPD and led a city task force addressing public safety issues for businesses.

=== Jackson County Prosecutor ===
==== Election ====
In November 2024, Johnson was elected Jackson County Prosecutor, defeating independent candidate Tracey Chappell. She had previously won a three-way Democratic primary. Her historic election made her the first Black person to hold the position in Jackson County. Her campaign received endorsements from organizations including The Kansas City Star, Planned Parenthood, and Abortion Action Missouri.

Johnson was officially sworn into office on January 3, 2025. Upon her election, she referred to herself as "a little Black girl from the east side of Kansas City" who had risen to become a top-ranking law enforcement official in the county.

==== Tenure ====
Upon taking office, Johnson appointed Dion Sankar as Chief Deputy Prosecutor, Gina Robinson as Director of Operations, and Theresa Crayon as Director of Programs.

In February 2025, Johnson announced significant changes to the prosecution of domestic violence cases. The new policy directs more serious domestic violence offenses, particularly felony acts such as strangulation or domestic violence in the presence of a child, to be handled at the county level rather than in municipal courts. The stated rationale is to ensure offenders face more significant penalties. KCUR reported that this shift had "dramatically increased the county's role in domestic violence cases" shortly after its implementation. Johnson stated her intention to file state felony charges against domestic abusers who physically harmed their victims, citing an increase in domestic violence-related homicides in Jackson County in early 2025, where such incidents accounted for approximately one in three homicides compared to one in twelve in the same period of the previous year. Her office assigned prosecutors to each of the three assault squads in the Kansas City Police Department.

During her campaign and upon taking office, Johnson prioritized addressing property crime. She announced plans for and subsequently launched a new, dedicated property crimes unit within the prosecutor's office. This unit was staffed initially by three prosecutors, two data analysts, and law student interns, and is intended to provide a quicker response to nonviolent cases, handle hearings for "high-impact" offenders, and engage with community groups to identify crime trends.

Johnson indicated she would review the policy of her predecessor, Jean Peters Baker, regarding low-level nonviolent drug offenses. She planned to continue directing individuals in nonviolent, lower-level possession cases toward treatment, and to pursue charges more often against drug distributors, even if without a direct tie to violence. Johnson stated she would continue her predecessor's policies of race-blind charging and maintaining the Crime Strategies Unit. Her office oversees the Jackson County COMBAT program, which funds crime prevention and substance abuse treatment.

Beginning in early 2025, Johnson's office faced challenges due to a Jackson County budget crisis. The dispute between the County Executive and the Legislature left the county operating without an approved 2025 budget for several months, impacting the prosecutor's office's ability to distribute funds, including COMBAT funds and public safety sales tax dollars designated for substance abuse treatment and violence prevention programs.

== Awards and affiliations ==
Johnson has received awards including the Missouri Lawyers Weekly "Up & Coming Award" and recognition in Ink Magazine's "30 Under 30" list. She was named "Rookie of the Year" by the Jackson County Prosecutor's Office.

Her affiliations include the Kansas City Metropolitan Bar Association, the Jackson County Bar Association, and Alpha Kappa Alpha sorority. She has served on community boards including the KIPP Academy School Board, the Englewood Arts Board, and the Youth Guidance Advisory Council, and on the Jackson County COMBAT Commission.
