= Patrick Wroblewski =

American politician

Member-elect of the Missouri House of Representatives from the 72nd district
- Assuming office January 6, 2027
- Succeeding: Doug Clemens

Personal details
- Born: St. Louis, Missouri
- Party: Democratic
- Education: Harvard Kennedy School; University of Missouri–St. Louis
- Website: Campaign website

Patrick James Wroblewski is an American politician of the Missouri Democratic Party who is the representative-elect for the 72nd district in the Missouri House of Representatives. He was elected in the 2026 general election. Wroblewski was mayor of Overland, Missouri.
