= Brenda Shields =

American politician

Member of the Missouri House of Representatives from the 11th district
- Incumbent
- Assumed office January 9, 2018
- Preceded by: Galen Higdon
- Succeeded by: Taylor Crouse (elect)

Personal details
- Party: Republican
- Education: University of Missouri

Brenda Kay Shields is an American politician in the Missouri House of Representatives, elected in November 2018 to represent District 11, and is a member of the Republican Party (United States). Her district represents part of Buchanan County, Missouri.

== Missouri House of Representatives ==
=== Committee assignments ===
- Higher Education, Chairwoman
- Subcommittee on Appropriations - Education, Chairwoman
- Children and Families
- Budget
- Joint Committee on Child Abuse and Neglect

== Electoral history ==
Missouri House of Representatives Primary Election, August 7, 2018, District 11
Party	Candidate	Votes	%	±%
Republican	Brenda Shields	3,178	67.19%	
Republican	Lloyd Buck Graham	776	16.41%	
Republican	Chris Shove	776	16.41%	
Total votes		4,730	100.00%	

Missouri House of Representatives Election, November 3, 2018 District 11
Party	Candidate	Votes	%	±%
Republican	Brenda Shields	9,144	65.31%	−34.71%
Democratic	Brady Lee O'Dell	4,856	34.69%	+34.69%
Total votes		14,000	100.00%	

Missouri House of Representatives Election, November 6, 2020, District 11
Party	Candidate	Votes	%	±%
Republican	Brenda Shields	12,219	70.50%	+5.19%
Democratic	Brady Lee O'Dell	5,113	29.50%	−5.19%
Total votes		17,332	100.00%	

Missouri House of Representatives Election, November 8, 2022, District 11
Party	Candidate	Votes	%	±%
Republican	Brenda Shields	9,944	100.00%	+29.50
Total votes		9,944	100.00%	
