= Derek Grier (politician) =

American politician

Member of the Missouri House of Representatives from the 100th district
- In office 2017–2023
- Preceded by: Sue Allen
- Succeeded by: Philip Oehlerking

Personal details
- Party: Republican
- Education: Principia College (BA)
- Website: votederekgrier.com

Derek Grier is an American politician who served as a Republican member of the Missouri House of Representatives from the state's 100th House district.

== Career ==
Grier graduated from Principia College with a B.A. in business administration, and works in the real estate industry.

Grier is known for promoting professional licensing reform. He also advocated for improvement of rural healthcare in the wake of the COVID-19 pandemic.
