= Taylor Crouse =

American politician

Member-elect of the Missouri House of Representatives from the 11th district
- Assuming office January 2027
- Succeeding: Brenda Shields

Personal details
- Party: Republican

Taylor Crouse is an American politician. A member of the Republican Party, he is the member-elect for the 11th district of the Missouri House of Representatives.
