= Sherman Parker =

American politician

Member of the Missouri House of Representatives from the 12th district
- In office 2002–2006
- Preceded by: Bill Luetkenhaus
- Succeeded by: Doug Funderburk

Personal details
- Born: August 21, 1971
- Died: September 18, 2008 (aged 37)
- Party: Republican

Sherman Parker (August 28, 1971 – September 18, 2008) was a member of the Missouri House of Representatives. He was a Republican who represented part of St. Charles County (District 12) for two terms. He was elected to the House in 2002 election and was re-elected in 2004 with 73% of the vote.

Parker left the House in 2006 to run for Congress but lost the Republican nomination to the incumbent, Rep. Todd Akin.

During the 92nd Missouri General Assembly, Parker was elected deputy majority whip and served as vice-chairman of the Financial Services Committee. He also served on the Education Committee and the Small Business Committee.

During his first year as a legislator, Missouri's community college chancellors and presidents named Parker their legislator of the year for his work and commitment to higher education. Parker was also named Missouri Votes Conservation's Rising Stars due to his leadership on conservation issues. In 2002, Parker was named by his peers the Missouri's Young Republican of the Year. In 2005, Cardinal Glennon Hospital awarded Parker the "Defender of the Children" award. From 2000 to 2007, he served on the board of directors of the Boys and Girls Clubs of St. Charles County. In 2006, Parker was named by the St. Louis Business Journal as one of the region's "Most Influential Minority Business Leaders".

Prior to his legislative duties, Parker served as the chief operating officer for Omicron Development Corporation, was a member of the executive staff of UniGroup, Inc., an account comptroller for State Street Bank in Boston, Massachusetts, and served as a special assistant to three United States Senators: Missouri senator and former Missouri governor Christopher "Kit" Bond, former senator Jim Talent, and former senator and governor John Ashcroft.

He received his B.A. in North and South American history and political science at the University of Vermont in 1994. During his junior year there, he attended the St. Louis University in Madrid, Spain. He was a member of St. Peter's African Methodist Episcopal Church.

Parker died suddenly as a result of a brain aneurysm at Barnes-Jewish Hospital in St. Louis.
