= John Wright (Missouri politician) =

American politician

John A. Wright
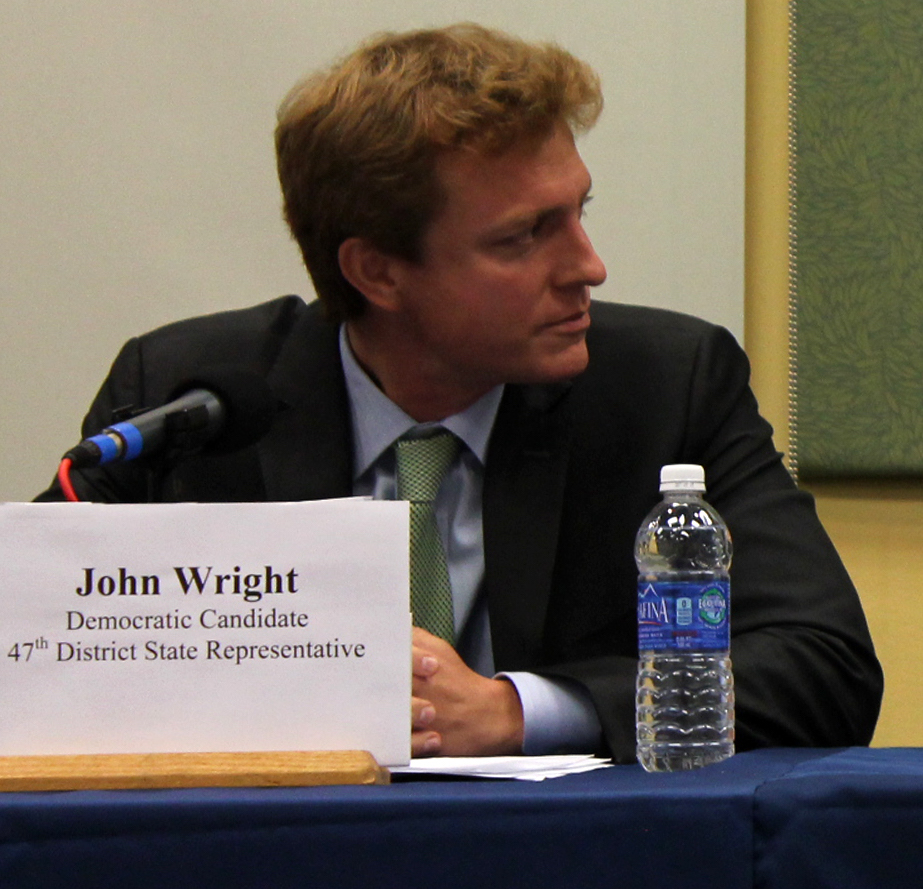
- Wright in 2014

Member of the Missouri House of Representatives from the 47th district
- In office 2013–2015
- Preceded by: Jeff Grisamore
- Succeeded by: Chuck Basye

Personal details
- Born: June 1, 1976 (age 50)
- Party: Democratic
- Education: Yale University; Yale Law School
- Occupation: Associate Professor of Law

John Wright (born 1976) is a former Democratic member of the Missouri House of Representatives, serving from 2013 to 2015. Wright supports expanding childhood education programs.
