= Bill Kidd (American politician) =

American politician

Bill E. Kidd

Member of the Missouri House of Representatives from the 20th district
- In office 2015–2023
- Succeeded by: Aaron McMullen

Personal details
- Born: November 16, 1952 (age 73) Tom Green County, Texas, U.S.
- Party: Republican
- Spouse: Jamie
- Children: 3
- Profession: Businessman

William Earl Kidd (born November 16, 1952) is an American politician. He is a former member of the Missouri House of Representatives, serving from 2015 to 2023. He is a member of the Republican Party.

== Electoral history ==
=== State representative ===
Missouri House of Representatives primary election, August 5, 2014, District 20
Party	Candidate	Votes	%	±%
Republican	Bill E. Kidd	1,757	71.86%	
Republican	Brent Lasater	688	28.14%	

Missouri House of Representatives election, November 4, 2014, District 20
Party	Candidate	Votes	%	±%
Republican	Bill E. Kidd	4,082	54.47%	+5.06
Democratic	John A. Mayfield	3,412	45.53%	−5.06

Missouri House of Representatives primary election, August 2, 2016, District 20
Party	Candidate	Votes	%	±%
Republican	Bill E. Kidd	1,919	63.27%	−8.59
Republican	Christopher Dale	1,114	36.73%	

Missouri House of Representatives election, November 8, 2016, District 20
Party	Candidate	Votes	%	±%
Republican	Bill E. Kidd	9,972	66.50%	+12.03
Democratic	Mike Englert	5,023	33.50%	− 12.03

Missouri House of Representatives election, November 6, 2018, District 20
Party	Candidate	Votes	%	±%
Republican	Bill E. Kidd	8,205	62.83%	−3.67
Democratic	Jessica Merrick	4,855	37.17%	+3.67
