= Jeff Grisamore =

American politician

Member of the Missouri House of Representatives from the 34th district
- In office January 9, 2013 – January 7, 2015
- Preceded by: Myron Neth
- Succeeded by: Rebecca Roeber

Member of the Missouri House of Representatives from the 47th district
- In office January 3, 2007 – January 9, 2013
- Preceded by: Robert Thane Johnson
- Succeeded by: John Wright (redistricting)

Personal details
- Born: November 16, 1961 (age 64)
- Party: Republican

Jeff Grisamore (born November 16, 1961) is an American politician who served in the Missouri House of Representatives from 2007 to 2015.
