= Dan Stacy =

American politician

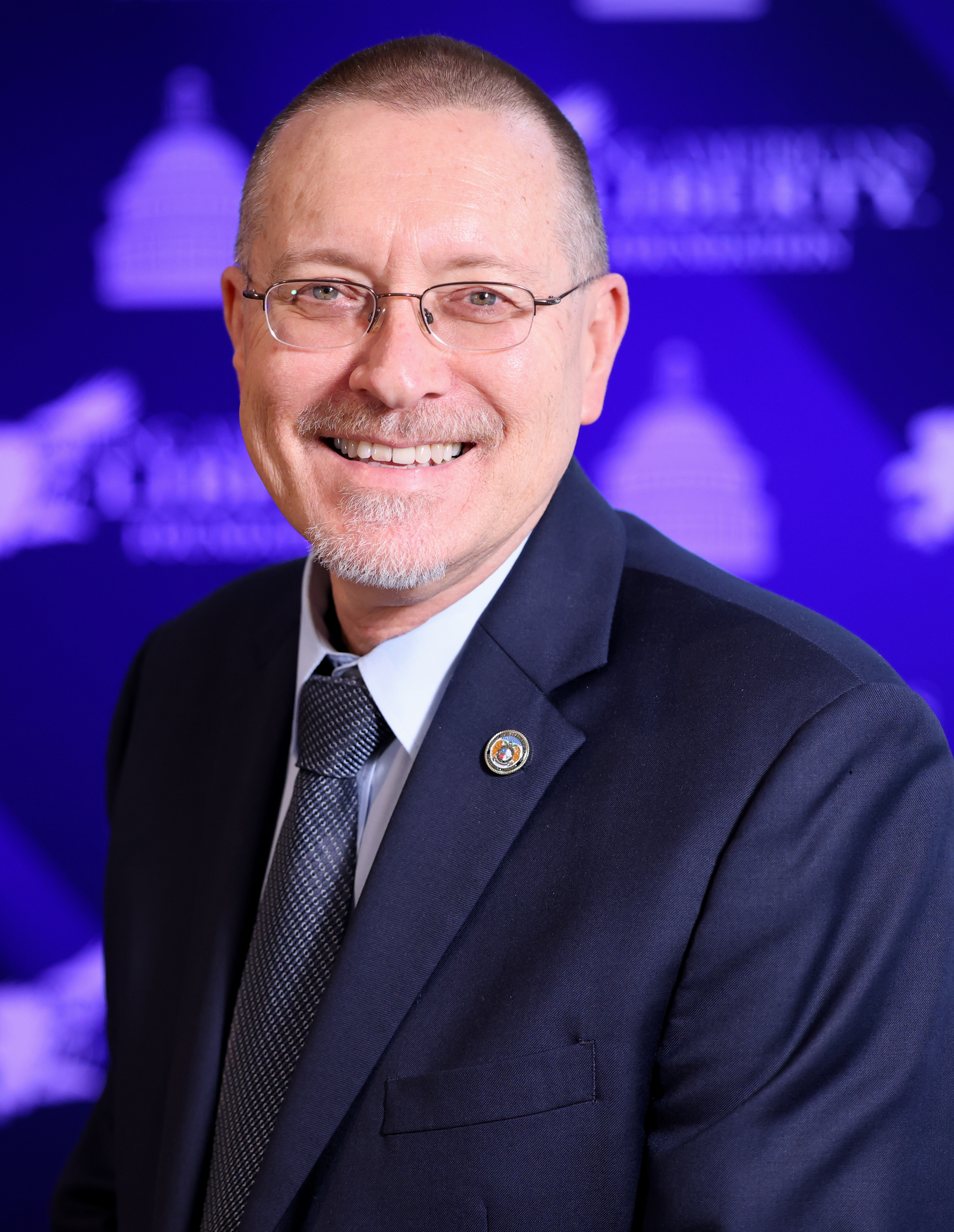
- Stacy at the 2024 Hazlitt Summit hosted by Young Americans for Liberty Foundation

Member of the Missouri House of Representatives from the 31st district
- In office January 2017 – January 2025
- Preceded by: Sheila Solon
- Succeeded by: Ron Fowler

Personal details
- Political party: Republican

Dan Stacy is a Missouri politician who was a member of the Missouri House of Representatives from 2017 to 2025, after defeating incumbent Sheila Solon in the 2016 primary election. He is a member of the Republican Party.

== Missouri House of Representatives ==
=== Committee assignments ===
- Corrections and Public Institutions
- Elections and Elected Officials
- Elementary and Secondary Education

=== Electoral history ===
2016 Missouri House of Representatives District 31 Republican Primary
| Party | Candidate | Votes | % | ±% |
|---|---|---|---|---|
| Republican | Dan Stacy | 1,926 | 54.75% | |
| Republican | Sheila Solon (incumbent) | 1,592 | 45.25% | |
| Total votes | | 3,518 | 100.00% | |

2016 Missouri House of Representatives District 31 General Election
| Party | Candidate | Votes | % | ±% |
|---|---|---|---|---|
| Republican | Dan Stacy | 13,768 | 100% | |

2018 Missouri House of Representatives District 31 General Election
| Party | Candidate | Votes | % | ±% |
|---|---|---|---|---|
| Republican | Dan Stacy | 8,356 | 55.87% | −44.13 |
| Democratic | Travis Hagewood | 6,599 | 44.13% | +44.13 |
| Total votes | | 14,955 | 100.00% | |

2020 Missouri House of Representatives District 31 Primary Election
| Party | Candidate | Votes | % | ±% |
|---|---|---|---|---|
| Republican | Dan Stacy | 2,783 | 89.17% | |
| Republican | Ronie Swinton | 338 | 10.83% | |
| Total votes | | 3,121 | 100.00% | |

2020 Missouri House of Representatives District 31 General Election
| Party | Candidate | Votes | % | ±% |
|---|---|---|---|---|
| Republican | Dan Stacy | 10,888 | 54.45% | −1.42 |
| Democratic | Rhonda Dolan | 9,109 | 45.55% | +1.42 |
| Total votes | | 19,997 | 100.00% | |

Missouri House of Representatives Election, November 8, 2022, District 31
| Party | Candidate | Votes | % | ±% |
|---|---|---|---|---|
| Republican | Dan Stacy | 7,585 | 56.77% | +2.32 |
| Democratic | Robert McCourt | 5,776 | 43.23% | −2.32 |
| Total votes | | 13,361 | 100.00% | |
