= Ray Salva =

American politician (born 1947)

Member of the Missouri House of Representatives from the 51st district
- In office 2003–2011
- Succeeded by: Ira Anders

Personal details
- Born: August 26, 1947 (age 78)
- Party: Democratic

Ray Salva (born August 26, 1947) is an American politician. He was member of the Missouri House of Representatives for the 51st district.

In 2014, Salva was sentenced to probation for social security fraud. Afterwards he disputed with the state government over the legislators pension.
