= Philip Oehlerking =

American politician

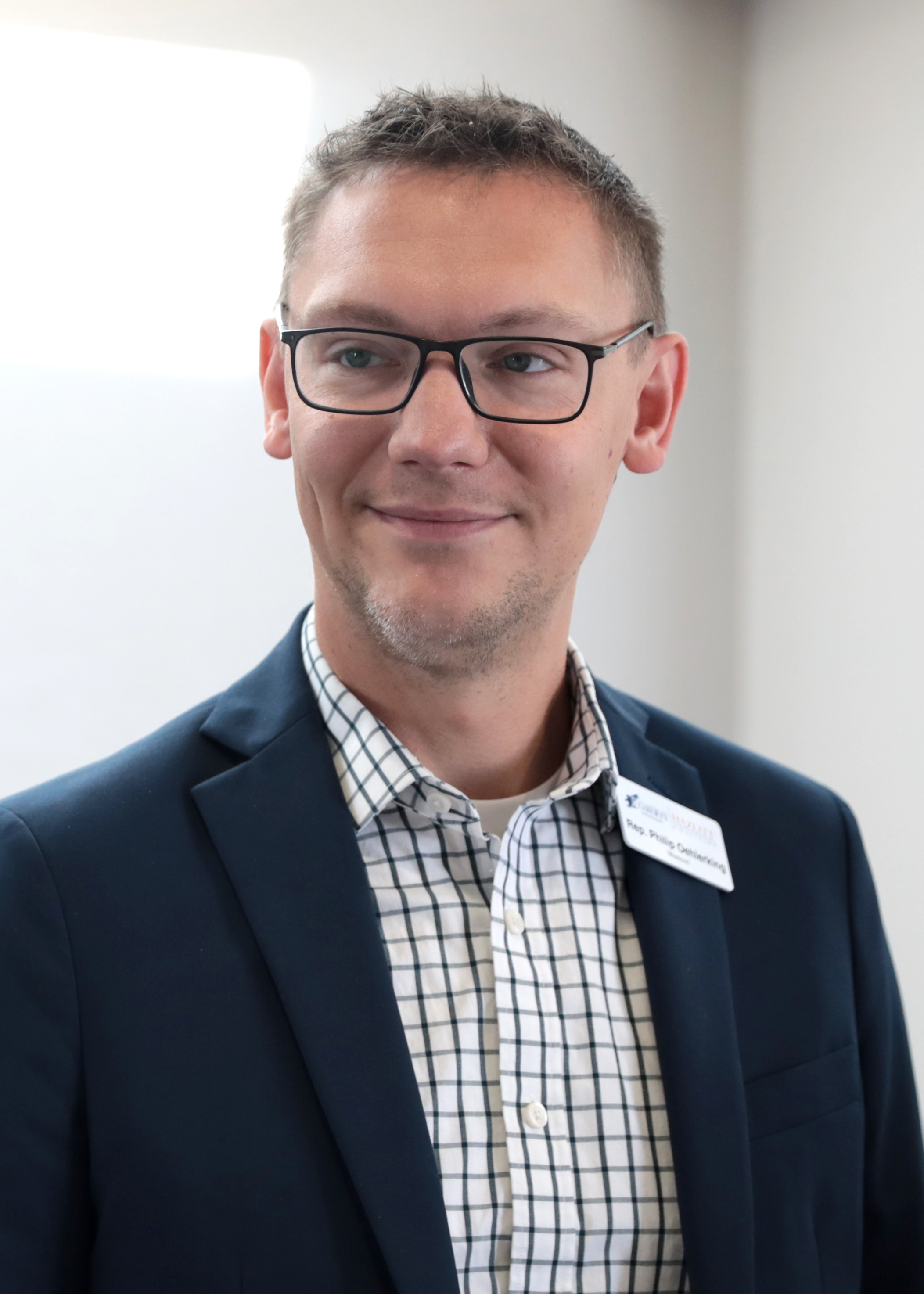

Member of the Missouri House of Representatives from the 100th district
- Incumbent
- Assumed office January 4, 2023
- Preceded by: Derek Grier
- Succeeded by: Mary Ann Perkins (elect)

Personal details
- Party: Republican
- Education: St. Louis Community College
- Alma mater: University of Missouri-St. Louis
- Website: https://www.electphiloehlerking.com/

Philip Oehlerking is an American politician serving as a Republican member of the Missouri House of Representatives from the 100th district since 2023. He represents part of St. Louis County and lives in Ballwin. He succeeded Derek Grier.

== Early life and career ==
Oehlerking earned an associate degree from St. Louis Community College in 2013 and a bachelor's degree in political science from the University of Missouri–St. Louis in 2015. He spent two years working for the Show-Me Institute, a free-market policy research organization, and later worked at the Missouri Higher Education Loan Authority as a business analyst before entering the legislature.

Oehlerking lives in Ballwin with his wife and daughter.

He serves as a deacon at the Trinity Church and works at the Missouri Higher Education Loan Authority (MOHELA).

== Political and Legislative Career ==
Oehlerking was first elected in November 2022, narrowly defeating Democrat Colin Lovett by 181 votes. He won a contested Republican primary in 2024 against Jason Jennings and Brant Harber and was re-elected that November in a rematch with Lovett.

In 2025 Oehlerking sponsored House Bill 754, which recognized gold and silver as legal tender in Missouri. Under the law, businesses may accept the precious metals as payment for everyday transactions but are not required to do so, while state government must accept electronic forms of gold and silver for taxes and public debts. The bill was handled in the Senate by Sandy Crawford, signed by Governor Mike Kehoe in July 2025, and took effect on August 28 of that year.

In 2026 he sponsored House Bill 2423, which revised provisions under the state Division of Finance by creating a fund for depositing money collected from consumer credit licensing fees. Kehoe signed it on April 23, 2026.

== Legislative Committees 2025-26 ==
- Vice-chairman - Financial Institutions
- Vice-chairman - Special Committee on Intergovernmental Affairs
- Emerging Issues
- Rules - Administrative

== Legislative Committees 2023-24 ==
- Subcommittee on Appropriations - Education
- Financial Institutions
- Pensions
- Workforce and Infrastructure Development

Missouri House of Representatives Election, November 8, 2022, District 100
| Party | Candidate | Votes | % | ±% |
|---|---|---|---|---|
| Republican | Philip Oehlerking | 8,315 | 50.55 | |
| Democratic | Colin Lovett | 8,134 | 49.45 | |
| Total votes | | 16,449 | 100.00 | |

Missouri House of Representatives Election, November 5, 2024, District 100
| Party | Candidate | Votes | % | ±% |
|---|---|---|---|---|
| Republican | Philip Oehlerking (incumbent) | 10,954 | 50.34 | −0.21 |
| Democratic | Colin Lovett | 10,811 | 49.66 | +0.21 |
| Total votes | | 21,765 | 100.00 | |
