= Noel Torpey =

American politician

Member of the Missouri House of Representatives from the 29th district
- In office January 9, 2013 – December 16, 2014
- Preceded by: Galen Higdon
- Succeeded by: Rory Rowland

Member of the Missouri House of Representatives from the 52nd district
- In office January 5, 2011 – January 9, 2013
- Preceded by: Paul LeVota
- Succeeded by: Stanley Cox

Personal details
- Born: December 12, 1971 (age 54)
- Party: Republican

Noel Torpey (born December 12, 1971) is an American politician who served in the Missouri House of Representatives from 2011 to 2014.
