= Tim Flook =

American politician

Member of the Missouri House of Representatives from the 119th district
- In office 2004–2010
- Succeeded by: Myron Neth

Personal details
- Born: February 3, 1972 (age 54)
- Party: Republican

Timothy (Tim) Flook is an American judge and politician. He was member of the Missouri House of Representatives for the 119th district.

In 2015, Governor Jay Nixon appointed Tim Flook as an Associate Circuit Judge for Clay County.
