= Bob Nance =

American politician

Bob Nance is an American politician.

Nance ran for the Missouri House of Representatives in 2004, defeating District 36 incumbent Gary Kelly, who had held the office for four years. Nance won reelection in 2006 against Jerry Cline, and subsequently defeated Barbara Lanning in twice, in 2008, as well as 2010. Nance did not run in the 2012 elections, and was replaced by Kevin McManus. Following the death of Clay County treasurer Ted Graves, Nance accepted a gubernatorial appointment to the office in 2019, and won a full term in his own right in 2020.
