= Mark Sharp =

American politician

Member of the Missouri House of Representatives from the 36th, 37th district
- Incumbent
- Assumed office January 8, 2020
- Preceded by: DaRon McGee
- Succeeded by: Karissa Varga (elect)

Personal details
- Party: Democratic

Mark Sharp is an American politician serving in the Missouri House of Representatives since 2020, succeeding fellow Democrat DaRon McGee.

== Missouri House of Representatives ==
=== Committee assignments ===
- Crime Prevention
- Elementary and Secondary Education
- General Laws
- Joint Committee on Legislative Research
- Special Committee on Urban Issues

=== Electoral history ===
2019 Missouri House of Representatives Special Election District 36
Party	Candidate	Votes	%	±%
Democratic	Mark Sharp	3,176	74.21%	
Green	Bob Vorhees	451	10.54%	
Write-In	Nola Wood	653	15.26%	
Total votes		4,280	100.00%	

Missouri House of Representatives Primary Election, August 4, 2020, District 36
Party	Candidate	Votes	%	±%
Democratic	Mark Sharp	3,268	64.08%	
Democratic	Laura Loyacono	1,832	35.92%	
Total votes		5,100	100.00%	

2020 Missouri House of Representatives District 36 General Election
Party	Candidate	Votes	%	±%
Democratic	Mark Sharp	11,320	68.00%	−6.21
Republican	Nola Wood	5,326	32.00%	+16.74
Total votes		16,646	100.00%	

Missouri House of Representatives Election, November 8, 2022, District 37
Party	Candidate	Votes	%	±%
Democratic	Mark Sharp	8,055	100.00%	+32.00
Total votes		8,055	100.00%	
