= Bill Luetkenhaus =

American politician

Member of the Missouri House of Representatives from the 12th district
- In office January 6, 1993 – January 8, 2003
- Preceded by: John J. Kauffman
- Succeeded by: Sherman Parker

Personal details
- Born: September 15, 1962 (age 63) St. Charles County, Missouri
- Party: Democratic

Bill Luetkenhaus (born September 15, 1962) is an American politician who served in the Missouri House of Representatives from the 12th district from 1993 to 2003.
