= Mary Ann Perkins =

American politician

Member-elect of the Missouri House of Representatives from the 100th district
- Assuming office January 2027
- Succeeding: Philip Oehlerking

Personal details
- Party: Democratic

Mary Ann Perkins is an American politician. A member of the Democratic Party, she is the member-elect for the 100th district of the Missouri House of Representatives.
