= Doug Clemens (politician) =

American politician

Member of the Missouri House of Representatives from the 72nd district
- Incumbent
- Assumed office January 9, 2019
- Preceded by: Mary Nichols
- Succeeded by: Patrick Wroblewski

Personal details
- Born: April 21, 1968 (age 58)
- Party: Democratic

Douglas Thomas Clemens (born April 21, 1968) is a Democratic member of the Missouri General Assembly representing the State's 72nd House district.

== Career ==
Clemens won the election on November 6, 2018 from the platform of Democratic Party. He secured 64% of the vote while his closest rival Republican Bruce Buwalda received 37%.

== Electoral history ==
Missouri House of Representatives Primary Election, August 7, 2018, District 72
| Party | Candidate | Votes | % | ±% |
|---|---|---|---|---|
| Democratic | Doug Clemens | 2,137 | 39.38% | |
| Democratic | Dan Wibracht | 1,605 | 29.57% | |
| Democratic | Eileen Grant McGeoghegan | 837 | 15.42% | |
| Democratic | Sheryl Gladney | 550 | 10.13% | |
| Democratic | Jeanine Molloff | 298 | 5.49% | |
| Total votes | | 5,427 | 100.00% | |

Missouri House of Representatives Election, November 6, 2018, District 72
| Party | Candidate | Votes | % | ±% |
|---|---|---|---|---|
| Democratic | Doug Clemens | 8,600 | 63.51% | |
| Republican | Bruce Buwalda | 4,942 | 36.49% | |
| Total votes | | 13,542 | 100.00% | |

Missouri House of Representatives Election, November 3, 2020, District 72
| Party | Candidate | Votes | % | ±% |
|---|---|---|---|---|
| Democratic | Doug Clemens | 9,865 | 61.45% | −2.06 |
| Republican | Darren Grant | 6,188 | 38.55% | +2.06 |
| Total votes | | 16,053 | 100.00% | |

Missouri House of Representatives Election, November 8, 2022, District 72
| Party | Candidate | Votes | % | ±% |
|---|---|---|---|---|
| Democratic | Doug Clemens | 7,114 | 100.00% | +38.55 |
| Total votes | | 7,114 | 100.00% | |
