= Nita Jane Ayres =

American politician

Member of the Missouri House of Representatives from the 62nd district
- In office February 2, 2010 – 2011
- Preceded by: Dennis Wood
- Succeeded by: Don Phillips

Personal details
- Party: Republican

Nita Jane Ayres is an American politician. She was member of the Missouri House of Representatives for the 62nd district.

Ayres later served as mayor of Branson West, Missouri.
