= Mike Talboy =

American politician

Member of the Missouri House of Representatives from the 37th district
- In office January 2007 – January 2013

Personal details
- Born: August 2, 1977 (age 49) Boise, Idaho
- Party: Democratic
- Education: University of Missouri-Kansas City
- Profession: Attorney

Mike Talboy (born August 2, 1977) was a Democratic member of the Missouri House of Representatives. Talboy represented the 37th District, which at the time encompassed much of downtown Kansas City south of the Missouri River, as well as portions of the East Side. During the 96th General Assembly, he also served as House Minority Floor Leader. He is a practicing attorney who formerly served as Burns & McDonnell Engineering's Director of Governmental Affairs. He also currently serves as the political director for the Kansas City Building and Construction Trades.

== Personal history ==
Mike Talboy was born in Boise, Idaho to Dr. Glenn E. Talboy, Jr., a surgeon, and Edna (Salcedo) Talboy, an education and instructional design consultant. He has two brothers. Talboy is of partly Colombian heritage: his maternal grandfather, Hector Salcedo, immigrated to the United States at the age of 33. Talboy moved with his family to Kansas City in 1993. He received a bachelor's degree in Communications from the University of Missouri–Kansas City in 2000, and a Juris Doctor from the University of Missouri–Kansas City School of Law in 2002. When the General Assembly was not in session, Talboy practiced law with the Kansas City firm Polsinelli Shughart.

== Political history ==
Mike Talboy became involved in local and national politics in 2001 while still a student at UMKC. In 2004, he served as a regional field director for the Missouri Coordinated Campaign, an organization working for Senator John Kerry's unsuccessful presidential run.

First elected to the Missouri House of Representatives in November 2006 after winning a three-way contested Democratic Primary, Talboy retained his seat in 2008 and 2010. In December 2008, Talboy was appointed Chairman of the Missouri House Democratic Campaign Committee, a group supporting Democrats in the 2010 elections. He ran unopposed for reelection in both the Democratic primary and the general election in both 2008 and 2010.

Beginning in 2012, as a result of redistricting following the 2010 United States census, Talboy resided in the new 24th District, which included all of Downtown Kansas City, cut out the old 37th District's heavily African American and Democratic East Side portion, and extended south through Midtown Kansas City (including Westport, Hyde Park, and Volker) to portions of the more affluent Country Club District, including the West Plaza and half of the Country Club Plaza itself. On February 28, 2012, Talboy registered to run for the new 24th District, and was unopposed in the Democratic primary, though he faced Republican Jonathan Sternberg, a Kansas City attorney who had no opponents in the Republican primary. On May 22, 2012, however, Talboy dropped out of the race and left the House of Representatives to become engineering firm Burns & McDonnell's first "Director of Governmental Affairs," reopening Democratic primary registration. If Talboy had won, he would have been term limited from running for the Missouri House of Representatives again.

== Organizations ==
- Member, The Missouri Bar
- Member, Operation Breakthrough Board of Directors
