= Nick King (politician) =

American politician

Member of the Missouri House of Representatives from the 17th district
- In office 2015–2017
- Succeeded by: Mark Ellebracht

Personal details
- Born: May 23, 1949 (age 77) Springfield, Massachusetts
- Party: Republican
- Spouse: Norma
- Children: Five
- Profession: Businessman

S. Nick King (born June 23, 1949) is an American politician. He is a former member of the Missouri House of Representatives, having served from 2015 to 2017. He is a member of the Republican party.

== Electoral history ==
=== State representative ===
Missouri House of Representatives Primary Election, August 5, 2014, District 17
Party	Candidate	Votes	%	±%
Republican	S. Nick King	2,098	100.00%	

Missouri House of Representatives Election, November 4, 2014, District 17
Party	Candidate	Votes	%	±%
Republican	S. Nick King	4,576	50.40%	−0.22
Democratic	Mark Ellebracht	4,504	49.60%	+0.22

Missouri House of Representatives Primary Election, August 2, 2016, District 17
Party	Candidate	Votes	%	±%
Republican	S. Nick King	1,599	49.31%	−50.69
Republican	Mary Hill	1,644	50.69%	
