= Jeanie Lauer =

American politician

Member of the Missouri House of Representatives from the 32nd district
- In office January 9, 2013 – January 9, 2019
- Preceded by: Ron Schieber
- Succeeded by: Jeff Coleman

Member of the Missouri House of Representatives from the 54th district
- In office January 5, 2011 – January 9, 2013
- Preceded by: Gary Dusenberg
- Succeeded by: Denny Hoskins

Personal details
- Born: May 8, 1954 (age 72) Cape Girardeau, Missouri
- Party: Republican

Jeanie Lauer (born May 8, 1954) is an American politician who served in the Missouri House of Representatives from 2011 to 2019.
