= Mary Still =

American politician (born 1954)

Member of the Missouri House of Representatives from the 25th district
- In office 2009–2013

Personal details
- Born: 1954 (age 71–72)
- Party: Democratic
- Education: University of Missouri

Mary Still (born 1954) (Note: Source 1 states that she was 54 in October 2008) is an American politician. She was member of the Missouri House of Representatives for the 25th district.
