= Kenny Biermann =

American politician

Member of the Missouri House of Representatives from the 17th district
- In office January 3, 2009 – January 5, 2011
- Preceded by: Vicki A. Schneider
- Succeeded by: Vicki A. Schneider

Personal details
- Party: Democratic

Kenny Biermann is an American politician. He was member of the Missouri House of Representatives for the 17th district.

He was a candidate for District 65 in 2016. He is a member of the Orchard Farm School Board.
