= Sheila Solon =

American politician

Member of the Missouri House of Representatives from the 9th district
- In office January 2019 – January 2021
- Preceded by: Delus Johnson
- Succeeded by: Dean Van Schoiack

Member of the Missouri House of Representatives from the 31st district
- In office 2011–2017
- Succeeded by: Dan Stacy

Personal details
- Born: c. 1959 (age 66–67)
- Party: Republican
- Spouse: Charlie
- Children: 2
- Profession: Account Coordinator

Sheila Solon (born c. 1959) is an American politician. She is a former member of the Missouri House of Representatives, representing the 9th district from 2019 to 2021. She is a member of the Republican party. Solon previously served in the Missouri House as a representative of the 31st district from 2011 to 2017.

== Electoral history ==
=== State representative ===
Missouri House of Representatives Primary Election, August 3, 2010, District 55
Party	Candidate	Votes	%	±%
Republican	Sheila Solon	2,391	55.21%	
Republican	Mike Parker	1,940	44.79%	

Missouri House of Representatives Election, November 2, 2010, District 55
Party	Candidate	Votes	%	±%
Republican	Sheila Solon	7,744	61.63%	−2.05
Democratic	Clay Rodgers	4,251	33.83%	−0.50
Libertarian	Jeffrey Hoorfar	570	4.54%	+2.55

Missouri House of Representatives Primary Election, August 7, 2012, District 31
Party	Candidate	Votes	%	±%
Republican	Sheila Solon	1,881	60.68%	+5.47
Republican	Chris Lievsay	1,219	39.32%	

Missouri House of Representatives Election, November 6, 2012, District 31
Party	Candidate	Votes	%	±%
Republican	Sheila Solon	9,505	56.29%	−5.34
Democratic	Dale Walkup	7,382	43.71%	+9.88

Missouri House of Representatives Election, November 4, 2014, District 31
Party	Candidate	Votes	%	±%
Republican	Sheila Solon	6,287	100.00%	+43.71

Missouri House of Representatives Primary Election, August 2, 2016, District 31
Party	Candidate	Votes	%	±%
Republican	Sheila Solon	1,592	45.25%	−54.75
Republican	Dan Stacy	1,926	54.75%	

Missouri House of Representatives Primary Election, August 7, 2018, District 9
Party	Candidate	Votes	%	±%
Republican	Sheila Solon	2,854	40.81%	−4.44
Republican	Mik Chester	2,561	36.62%	
Republican	Christopher Evans	1,013	14.49%	
Republican	Tina Goodrick	565	8.08%	

Missouri House of Representatives Election, November 6, 2018, District 9
Party	Candidate	Votes	%	±%
Republican	Sheila Solon	10,319	64.77%	−35.23
Democratic	Bob Bergland	5,613	35.23%	
