= Mary Nichols (politician) =

American politician (born 1949)

Member of the Missouri House of Representatives from the 72nd district
- In office 2011–2019
- Preceded by: Albert Joseph Liese
- Succeeded by: Doug Clemens

Personal details
- Born: November 18, 1949 (age 76)
- Party: Democratic
- Spouse: Robert K. Nichols

Mary Nichols (born November 18, 1949) is an American politician. She was a member of the Missouri House of Representatives from 2011 to 2019. She is a member of the Democratic Party.
