= Dwight Scharnhorst =

American politician

Member of the Missouri House of Representatives from the 93rd district
- In office 2006–2015

Personal details
- Born: November 11, 1947 (age 78) St. Louis, Missouri
- Party: Republican
- Profession: photographer

Dwight Scharnhorst (born November 11, 1947) is an American politician. He was a member of the Missouri House of Representatives, having served 2006 to 2015. He is a member of the Republican party.
