= Margo McNeil =

American politician (born 1948)

Member of the Missouri House of Representatives from the 69th district
- Incumbent
- Assumed office 2009

Personal details
- Born: June 22, 1948 (age 78) Cincinnati, Ohio, U.S.
- Party: Democratic
- Spouse: Michael
- Children: three

Margo McNeil (born June 22, 1948) is an American politician. She is a former member of the Missouri House of Representatives, and is currently serving on the Board of Education of the Hazelwood School District. She is a member of the Democratic party.
