= Beth Low =

American politician

Member of the Missouri House of Representatives from the 39th district
- In office 2009–2013

Personal details
- Party: Democratic
- Education: University of Missouri-Columbia; University of Kansas

Beth Low is an American politician. She was member of the Missouri House of Representatives for the 39th district.
