= Mike Lair =

American politician

Member of the Missouri House of Representatives from the 7th district
- In office 2009–2016

Personal details
- Born: February 26, 1946 Omaha, Nebraska
- Died: September 5, 2017 (aged 71) Jefferson City, Missouri
- Party: Republican
- Profession: teacher

Michael Lair (February 26, 1946 – September 5, 2017) was an American politician and former educator from the state of Missouri. A Republican, Lair was first elected to the Missouri House of Representatives on November 4, 2008 and subsequently re-elected in 2010 and 2012. He represented District 7 in the House which consists of all or portions of Caldwell, Carroll, Clinton, and Livingston Counties. Due to redistricting of House seats following the 2010 U.S. Census, the boundaries of the 7th district changed effective January, 2013.

== Personal life ==
Lair was born in Omaha, Nebraska. He graduated from Creighton Preparatory School in 1964. Following high school Lair attended the University of Nebraska-Omaha, earning a Bachelor of Science degree in History in 1970. Later in life, in 2003, he earned a master's degree in Education from Central Methodist University. Mike Lair was a high school History teacher and athletics coach in various Nebraska and South Dakota schools before moving to Chillicothe, Missouri in 1987. He spent over 38 years in the classroom before retiring in spring of 2008 to run for the Missouri House of Representatives. Prior to and during his time as an educator, he also worked as a farm hand, construction laborer, gas station attendant, and small business owner. Lair and wife Jeanne, a high school teacher, are the parents of one daughter and one son. They also have one granddaughter. Lair is a member of Saint Columban Catholic Church in Chillicothe. Lair retired from the Missouri General Assembly in 2016 and moved to Jefferson City, Missouri. He died at his home in Jefferson City from heart problems.

== Election history ==
Lair won his first election in November, 2008 by defeating Democrat Harry Wyse by a margin of 51.4% to 48.6%. Mike Lair was re-elected in November, 2010 defeating Democrat Dale R. Toms 74.6 to 25.4 percent. In 2012, Lair faced off again with Harry Wyse, his opponent from 2008. This time the margin of victory was 60 percent to 40 percent in favor of Lair. Under Missouri's term limits Lair was eligible to run for a final two-year term in the House in 2014 if he so chose.

== Legislative work ==
Representative Lair was a member of the House Retirement, Health Care Transformation, Correction and Public Institutions, and Education Appropriations committees. He was also a member of the Joint House and Senate Committee on Education. Other legislative assignments include serving as Chair of the House Appropriations Committee, and member of the Budget, Education, Retirement, and Rules committees.

In the 2012 legislative session Lair voted in favor of the following issues:

- Enabling the expansion of Charter schools
- Allowing employers to exempt contraception from healthcare coverage
- Prohibiting employees from suing co-workers for job injuries
- Prohibiting implementation of the Patient Protection and Affordable Care Act, aka "Obamacare"
- Requiring proof of citizenship for U.S. Presidential candidates
- Requiring photo ID to vote

== Organizations ==
Lair was a member of the National Rifle Association of America, National Council for Social Studies, Ducks Unlimited, and the Missouri Farm Bureau.

Missouri 7th District State Representative Election 2012
Party	Candidate	Votes	%	±%
Republican	Mike Lair	8,621	60.00	Winner
Democratic	Harry Wyse	5,748	40.00	

Missouri 7th District State Representative Election 2010
Party	Candidate	Votes	%	±%
Republican	Mike Lair	8,389	74.6	Winner
Democratic	Dale R. Toms	2,858	25.4	

Missouri 7th District State Representative Election 2008
Party	Candidate	Votes	%	±%
Republican	Mike Lair	7,937	51.4	Winner
Democratic	Harry Wyse	7,509	48.6	
