= Joe Smith (Missouri politician) =

American politician

Member of the Missouri House of Representatives from the 14th district
- In office January 2003 – January 5, 2011
- Preceded by: Cindy Ostmann
- Succeeded by: Kathie Conway

Personal details
- Born: June 13, 1972 (age 54) St. Louis County, Missouri
- Party: Republican
- Children: 1
- Education: Lindenwood University (B.A. cum laude)
- Occupation: Human Resources
- Profession: Politician

Joseph Michael Smith (born c. June 13, 1972) is a former Republican member of the Missouri House of Representatives. He represented the 14th district, encompassing part of St. Charles County. By Missouri law, Smith was term-limited and unable to run for reelection in 2010.

== Personal life ==
=== Background and education ===
Smith was born in St. Louis County, and graduated from Francis Howell High School in 1991. He received his associate of arts degree from St. Charles Community College in 1998, and his bachelor of arts degree cum laude in corporate communications from Lindenwood University in 2000. In 2009, Smith received his master of arts degree in service agency management.

Smith currently resides in St. Charles with his wife, Kimberley, and their son.

=== Career ===
Prior to his legislative service, Smith was employed as a UPS driver. Smith was later employed as an account representative at Lindenwood University.

=== Group and church memberships ===
Smith and his family are believers in Christianity. Smith is also a member of the Chambers of Commerce for St. Peters and St. Charles city, the St. Charles Pachyderm Club, and the St. Charles Young Republicans. Smith currently serves in the St Charles County Convention & Sports Facilities Authority.

== Elected office ==
In 2002, Smith first ran for the 14th district state representative seat being vacated by Cindy Ostmann, who was term-limited. Smith won the Republican primary, beating Mike Dudley by 119 votes. Smith won the general election in November against Judy Davidson. Smith ran unopposed in 2004, and fended off challenges in 2006 and 2008 from Doug Broste.

== Electoral history ==
2008 General Election for Missouri's 14th District House of Representatives
Party	Candidate	Votes	%	±%
Republican	Joe Smith	11,952	62.3	
Democratic	Douglas R. Broste	7,219	37.7	

2006 General Election for Missouri's 14th District House of Representatives
Party	Candidate	Votes	%	±%
Republican	Joe Smith	8,838	60.5	
Democratic	Douglas R. Broste	5,778	39.5	

2002 General Election for Missouri's 14th District House of Representatives
Party	Candidate	Votes	%	±%
Republican	Joe Smith	7,382	59.3	
Democratic	Judy Davidson	5,072	40.7	

2002 Primary Election for Missouri's 14th District House of Representatives
Party	Candidate	Votes	%	±%
Republican	Joe Smith	1,755	51.8	
Republican	Mike Dudley	1,636	48.2	
