= Anne Zerr =

American politician

Member of the Missouri House of Representatives from the 65th district
- In office January 2013 – January 2017
- Succeeded by: Tom Hannegan

Member of the Missouri House of Representatives from the 18th district
- In office January 2009 – January 2016
- Preceded by: Tom Dempsey

Personal details
- Born: August 26, 1954 (age 72) St. Louis, Missouri, U.S.
- Party: Republican
- Spouse: Michael Zerr
- Children: 3
- Education: Lindenwood University
- Profession: Educator

Anne Zerr (born August 26, 1954) is a Republican former member of the Missouri House of Representatives. Zerr represented the 18th District, redrawn during her tenure as the 65th District, which encompasses portions of St. Charles County, Missouri. She was first elected to the Missouri House in 2008.

== Early life, education and career ==
Anne Zerr was born in St. Louis, Missouri in 1954. She was raised in the area and graduated from Maplewood Richmond Heights High School. Following high school Zerr attended Lindenwood University, earning a bachelor's degree in human resource development, and later an MBA and a master's degree in human service agency management. Zerr also furthered her education at Harvard University's Kennedy School of Government and the Delinquency Control Institute at USC. Prior to entering politics Zerr worked as executive director for Partners for Progress, director of community affairs for SSM St. Joseph Hospital West, and adult admissions director for Lindenwood University. Zerr is currently an adjunct professor of political science at Lindenwood University. She and husband Michael are the parents of two sons and a daughter.

== Politics ==
Representative Zerr first ran for office in 2008, hoping to fill the 18th district Missouri House seat vacated by Tom Dempsey. Zerr edged out fellow Republican Matthew Seeds in the August 2008 primary. An unusual situation developed for the November general election as Democratic candidate Tim Swope attempted to withdraw from the race. Being unable to do so, Swope declared he would not serve if elected. Zerr won election with 59.4 percent of the vote. In 2010 Zerr defeated Democrat Gary McKiddy to win her second term in the state legislature.

Zerr ran for the Missouri Senate in 2016, but lost in the Republican primary to businessman Bill Eigel.

=== Legislative assignments ===
Representative Zerr served on the following committees:

- Administration and Accounts
- Appropriations – Health, Mental Health, and Social Services
- Chairman, Economic Development
- Joint Committee on Gaming and Wagering
- Tourism and Natural Resources

Missouri 23 District State Senate Primary 2016
Party	Candidate	Votes	%	±%
Republican	Anne Zerr	10,756	38.9	lost
Republican	Bill Eigel	11,141	40.30	
Republican	Mike Carter	5,746	20.78	

Missouri House of Representatives — District 65 — St. Charles County (2014)
Party	Candidate	Votes	%	±%
Republican	Anne Zerr	7,688	100.00%	+17.94

Missouri House of Representatives — District 65 — St. Charles County (2012)
Party	Candidate	Votes	%	±%
Republican	Anne Zerr	12,751	82.06%	Winner
Libertarian	John Alsup	2,788	17.94%	

Missouri 18th District State Representative Election 2010
Party	Candidate	Votes	%	±%
Republican	Anne Zerr	7,165	68.2	Winner
Democratic	Gary McKiddy	3,337	31.8	

Missouri 18th District State Representative Election 2008
Party	Candidate	Votes	%	±%
Republican	Anne Zerr	9,165	59.4	Winner
Democratic	Tim Swope	5,750	37.3	
