= Steve Webb (Missouri politician) =

American politician

Member of the Missouri House of Representatives from the 67th district
- In office 2010 – December 2, 2013

Personal details
- Party: Democratic

Steve Webb is an American politician. He was member of the Missouri House of Representatives for the 67th district.

Webb resigned from the state house on December 2, 2013. In 2014, he was convicted of theft.
