= Michael George Corcoran =

American politician

Mayor of St. Ann, Missouri
- Incumbent
- Assumed office 2019

Member of the Missouri House of Representatives from the 77th district
- In office January 8, 2003 – January 5, 2011
- Preceded by: David L. Reynolds
- Succeeded by: Eileen Grant McGeoghegan

Personal details
- Born: January 25, 1963 (age 63) St. Ann, Missouri
- Party: Democratic

Michael George Corcoran (born January 25, 1963) is an American politician who served in the Missouri House of Representatives from the 77th district from 2003 to 2011.

Michael G Corcoran was elected Mayor of St. Ann, Missouri in 2019
