= Sam Komo =

American politician

Member of the Missouri House of Representatives from the 90th district
- In office 2007–2011
- Succeeded by: John McCaherty

Personal details
- Party: Democratic

Martin "Sam" Komo is an American politician. He was member of the Missouri House of Representatives for the 90th district.

On July 2, 2021, Komo joined the Missouri Department of Commerce & Insurance as captive manager.
