= John McCaherty =

American politician from Missouri

John C. McCaherty

Member of the Missouri House of Representatives from the 97th district
- In office 2011 – September 16, 2017
- Preceded by: Sam Komo
- Succeeded by: Mike Revis

Personal details
- Born: April 6, 1965 (age 61) Columbus, Mississippi
- Party: Republican
- Spouse: Adriane
- Children: two
- Profession: pastor

John C. McCaherty (born April 6, 1965) is an American politician. He was a member of the Missouri House of Representatives, from 2011 to September 16, 2017. He is a member of the Republican Party.

McCaherty announced his resignation on September 16, 2017, so he could run for (Jefferson County) executive in November 2018.
