= Marsha Haefner =

American politician

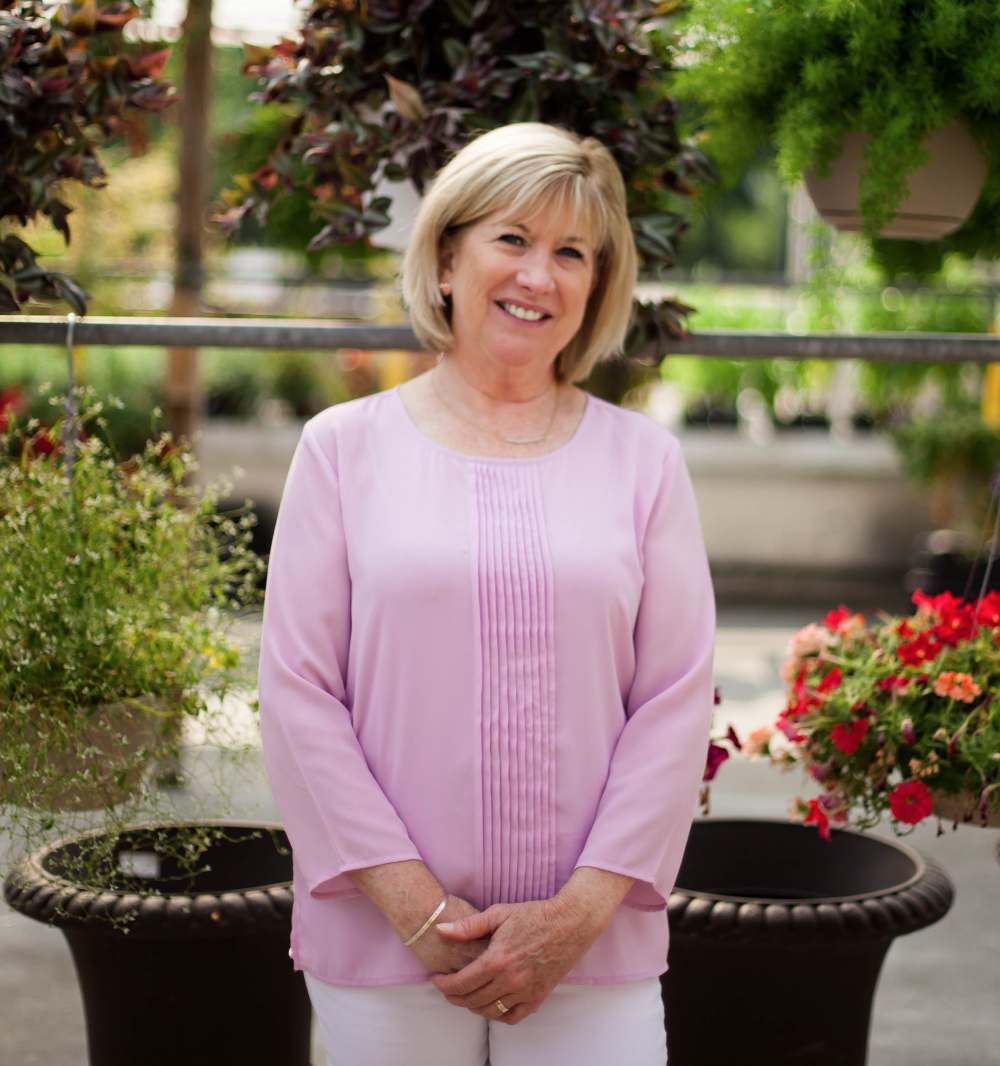

Member of the Missouri House of Representatives from the 95th district
- In office 2013 – January 9, 2019
- Succeeded by: Michael O'Donnell

Member of the Missouri House of Representatives from the 100th district
- In office 2011–2013
- Preceded by: Sue Schoemehl
- Succeeded by: Sue Allen

Personal details
- Born: June 8, 1951 (age 75) Webster Groves, Missouri, U.S.
- Party: Republican
- Spouse: Greg Haefner
- Children: Three
- Education: University of Missouri (BS)
- Website: Campaign website Government website

Marsha Haefner (born July 8, 1951) is an American politician. She was a member of the Missouri House of Representatives, serving since first being elected in 2010 to January 2019. She is a member of the Republican Party.

== Public office ==
Haefner was elected to the Missouri House of Representatives in 2010 from the 95th District. She defeated Democratic challenger Andrew Spavale. While in the state House, she was Chair of the Fiscal Review Committee and a member of the Ethics Committee and Joint Committee on Tax Policy among others.

=== Potential campaign for U.S. Senate ===
Haefner considered a run for the U.S. Senate seat currently held by Claire McCaskill after receiving encouragement from Republican U.S. Rep. Ann Wagner (MO-02).

== Electoral history ==
Missouri House of Representatives 95th district election, 2016
Party	Candidate	Votes	%	±%
Republican	Marsha Haefner	12,905	63.0%	
Democratic	Glenn Koenen	7,565	37.0%	

Missouri House of Representatives 95th district election, 2014
Party	Candidate	Votes	%	±%
Republican	Marsha Haefner	10,150	100.0%	

Missouri House of Representatives 95th district election, 2012
Party	Candidate	Votes	%	±%
Republican	Marsha Haefner	11,920	59.8%	
Democratic	Joe Zelle	8,025	40.2%	

Missouri House of Representatives 100th district election, 2010
Party	Candidate	Votes	%	±%
Republican	Marsha Haefner	9,593	64.3%	
Democratic	Andrew Spavale	5,072	34.0%	
Constitution	Lewis, Randall (Randy)	256	1.7%	
