= Brent Lasater =

American politician

Member of the Missouri House of Representatives from the 53rd district
- Incumbent
- Assumed office January 2011
- Preceded by: Curt Dougherty

Personal details
- Born: July 13, 1960 (age 66) Tipton, Indiana
- Party: Republican
- Spouse: Veta
- Profession: Retired truck driver

Brent Lasater (born July 13, 1960) was a Republican member of the Missouri House of Representativesfrom 2010 to 2012. Lasater represents the 53rd District, encompassing part of Jackson County, Missouri. He was first elected to the Missouri House in November, 2010.

== Personal life ==
Brent Lasater was born in Tipton, Indiana and raised in the Kansas City, Missouri area. After graduation from Blue Springs Christian School in 1978 he attended Joe Herndon Area Vocational-Technical School and Blue River Community College. Lasater still drives after 35 years as a professional truck driver. He and wife Veta have been married since 1980 and are the parents of one married son and one married daughter, they have two grandsons named Tyler and Jaxon ages 12 and 6. When not engaged in his Representative duties Lasater resides in Independence, Missouri. In 2016 Lasater is seeking the State Senate district 11.

== Politics ==
Brent Lasater was elected to the Missouri House of Representatives in 2010 on his third attempt. Lasater had made unsuccessful runs for the 53rd District seat in 2006 and 2008. The seat was previously held by the term-limited Curt Dougherty. After defeating fellow Republican Anna Lynn Vogel in the August 2010 primary, Lasater was victorious over Democrat Diane Egger in the November general election. The contest was notable among Missouri politics for the large disparity in money spent by the two candidates. While Egger raised over $30,000, Lasater reported limited activity with the Missouri Ethics Commission, spending no more than $500. He is a member of the Missouri Farm Bureau, National Rifle Association, and Jackson County Republican Club.

=== Legislative assignment ===
Representative Lasater serves on the following committees:

- Appropriations - Public Safety and Corrections
- Crime Prevention and Public Safety
- Tourism and Natural Resources
- Transportation Funding and Public Institutions - Vice-Chairman
- Interim Committee on Passenger Rail
- Interim Committee on Criminal Justice

== Electoral history ==
=== State representative ===
Missouri 53rd District State Representative Election November 7, 2006
| Party | Candidate | Votes | % | ±% |
|---|---|---|---|---|
| Democratic | Curt Dougherty | 7,883 | 64.7 | Winner |
| Republican | Brent Lasater | 4,298 | 35.3 | |

Missouri 53rd District State Representative Election November 4, 2008
| Party | Candidate | Votes | % | ±% |
|---|---|---|---|---|
| Democratic | Curt Dougherty | 10,220 | 63.1 | Winner |
| Republican | Brent Lasater | 5,976 | 36.9 | |

Missouri 53rd District State Representative Election 2010
| Party | Candidate | Votes | % | ±% |
|---|---|---|---|---|
| Republican | Brent Lasater | 5,284 | 55.1 | Winner |
| Democratic | Diane Egger | 4,210 | 43.9 | |

Missouri 20th District State Representative Election November 6, 2012
| Party | Candidate | Votes | % | ±% |
|---|---|---|---|---|
| Republican | Brent Lasater | 7,514 | 49.4 | |
| Democratic | John Mayfield | 7,692 | 50.6 | Winner |

Missouri 20th District State Representative Primary Election August 5, 2014
| Party | Candidate | Votes | % | ±% |
|---|---|---|---|---|
| Republican | Brent Lasater | 688 | 28.1 | |
| Republican | Bill E. Kidd | 1,757 | 71.9 | Winner |

=== State Senate ===
Missouri 11th District State Senate Election November 8, 2016
| Party | Candidate | Votes | % | ±% |
|---|---|---|---|---|
| Democratic | John Joseph Rizzo | 33,071 | 52.2 | Winner |
| Republican | Brent Lasater | 30,318 | 47.8 | |
