= Steve Hobbs (Missouri politician) =

American politician

Steve Hobbs is a farmer and a Missouri Republican politician.

== Politics ==
Hobbs was first elected to the Missouri House of Representatives in 2002, winning reelection in 2004.

== Personal information ==
He is the president of Hobbs Farms, Inc., a firm he had started with his father, in 1997. He is a member of such organizations as the Missouri Farm Bureau, for which he is former secretary/treasurer and legislative chair, the Beef Advisory Board, of which he is a former president and chair, the Mexico MFA Exchange Board, the Audrian County Cattleman's Board, of which he is a past president, a board member of Mexico MFA Oil, the Missouri Beef Industry Council, and the Soybean Association. He is currently a resident of Mexico, Missouri and is a member of Rush Hill Community Church.
