= Sylvester Taylor II =

American politician

Member of the Missouri House of Representatives from the 80th district
- In office 2011–2013
- Preceded by: Theodore Hoskins

Personal details
- Party: Democratic

Sylvester Taylor II is an American politician. He was member of the Missouri House of Representatives for the 80th district.

Taylor was a candidate for District 75 in the 2022 Missouri House of Representatives election. Taylor later served as President of Hazelwood School District.
