= Leonard Hughes IV =

American politician

Leonard Jonas Hughes IV

Member of the Missouri House of Representatives from the 42nd district
- In office January 6, 2005 – January 6, 2013
- Preceded by: Yvonne Wilson
- Succeeded by: Ashley Manlove

Personal details
- Born: Kansas City, Missouri, U.S.
- Party: Democratic
- Education: University of Missouri-Kansas City (BS); Andrew Young University (MBL)

Military service
- Allegiance: United States

Leonard S. Hughes IV (born April 15, 1979) was a Democratic legislator in the Missouri House of Representatives.

He represented part of Kansas City, Missouri in Jackson County, District 42. He was the youngest ever elected to the Missouri House at the age of 24. The former record holder was a 25 yr lawyer, Leonard S. Hughes III, his father. His father's victory led to the creation of the Missouri Court Plan. Leonard S Hughes IV was the first Democrat ever elected by the Majority serving in a leader of the 2005 Freshman Class. During his tenure in the House, he was Vice Chair of the Black Caucus, Assistant Minority Whip, in addition to serving in Democratic Leadership early in his career. He served unopposed for four terms in the Missouri House, becoming known for developing tactics and strategies to successfully pass bills in Republican Majority. One of his notable achievements was securing funding to build the new Samuel Rodgers Health Facility.

== Early life and education ==
Hughes began his schooling at St. Joseph's Catholic School before finishing his elementary education at St. Peters Catholic School. He began Highschool attending Rockhurst University but Hughes claims is a "disagreement" between himself and the Jesuits led him to attend Blue Springs South Highschool. Hughes claims Blue Springs South was the inadvertent birth of his passion for activism after a textbook containing a chapter on Black English he found offensive was the beginning of a discussion that Blue Springs South Highschool led the efforts to embrace students of color ensuring the curriculum was up to date. Hughes went to the University Of Missouri-Kansas City where he became an integral part of student life. He was Presiden of The African American Student Union. He was Vice President of The Activity and Programs Council before serving 3 terms as Student Body President. During his tenure, they were able to secure the funds responsible for the Student Union they enjoy on campus today.

== Political pedigree ==
There is a myth Hughes was born on a poll but in reality, his family has been involved in Kansas City politics for decades. His Grandfather Leonard S. Hughes Jr. was the first black judge for Kansas City Municipal Court. Mamie Hughes his grandmother was the first woman on the Jackson County Legislator, later serving on Jimmy Carter's Council On Women's Rights. His Father Leonard S. Hughes III was elected to Circuit Court Judge in 1979 sitting on the bench until 1993 when he founded the municipal court for domestic violence the first in the nation to deal with the problem solely. Lisa Hughes his mother was Vice President of Freedom Inc, a Democratic National Committee Woman. There is no question to Hughes's Political pedigree as he began working polls, earning his position as President of Young Freedom, Kansas City NAACP, and Vice President of the Young Democrats of Misso%uri.

== Representative tenure ==
Hughes was elected to the Missouri House in 2005. Two years later he ran successfully for re-election to the House. He was a ranking member of the Budget Committee, Ranking Member on State Office Appropriations, Vice Chair of Urban Issues, and member of the Elementary Education committee. He was responsible for some of the most notable policies written during that time ranging from labeling Genetically Modified Food to the Missouri Government creating a policy of ensuring 10% of all contracts go to MBE and WBE. He wrote the original expungement bill that was later passed during the 2016 session. He was a vocal proponent of the controversial school choice movement which lead to the creation of a new committee he served as Vice Chair on the Committee for Urban Education and as a member of the Student Achievement Committee. Hughes won awards for his policy leading to the successful efforts to establish a commission to monitor Missouri's Minority & Women's Business Enterprise program. His relationship with the Democratic Party during this time was known as a rising star, but issues behind the scenes due to disagreements on the strategy after Paul LeVota was no longer minority leader.

Under the next Democratic leadership that was responsible for the catastrophic losses due to the inept counsel in place at the time. There were many contentious issues beginning in 2010 that Hughes began to disagree with the leadership strategy to vote for a policy that was not in alignment with Democratic ideology. Hughes spoke out, believing voting for bad policy to save themselves was cowardly and lead to further loss. The Democratic Leadership wrote a law specifically targeting Hughes in 2010 preventing him from taking his seat for two months until he paid a $19,000 fine. Two weeks after paying the fine, the Missouri Supreme Court found the law unconstitutional.

In 2011, Hughes cast the deciding vote to override Democratic Governor Jay Nixon's veto and enact a Republican-supported congressional redistricting map The Democratic version of the map would have eliminated the only black congressional districts in order to save the seat of one underperforming Democrat. The blowback and bullying by the Democratic party were so intense that Republican Leadership gave Hughes support allowing him to continue passing legislation despite the lack of Democratic Support.

== After office ==
Hughes began a consulting company Abraxas LLC which he later sold for an undisclosed amount, allowing him to take a break from politics. He continues to stay involved with local politics and has led many successful campaigns in hopes of putting people in office capable of representing their constituents in the manner they deserve. He speaks across the country at Universities and conferences on topics ranging from politics to business, and crisis management. Hughes most recently published his first book, "Rebel Yell: Essays To Enlighten and Entertain" currently available on Amazon. His podcast is growing in popularity as he moves away from politics to humor to educate Americans on the importance of participating in politics.

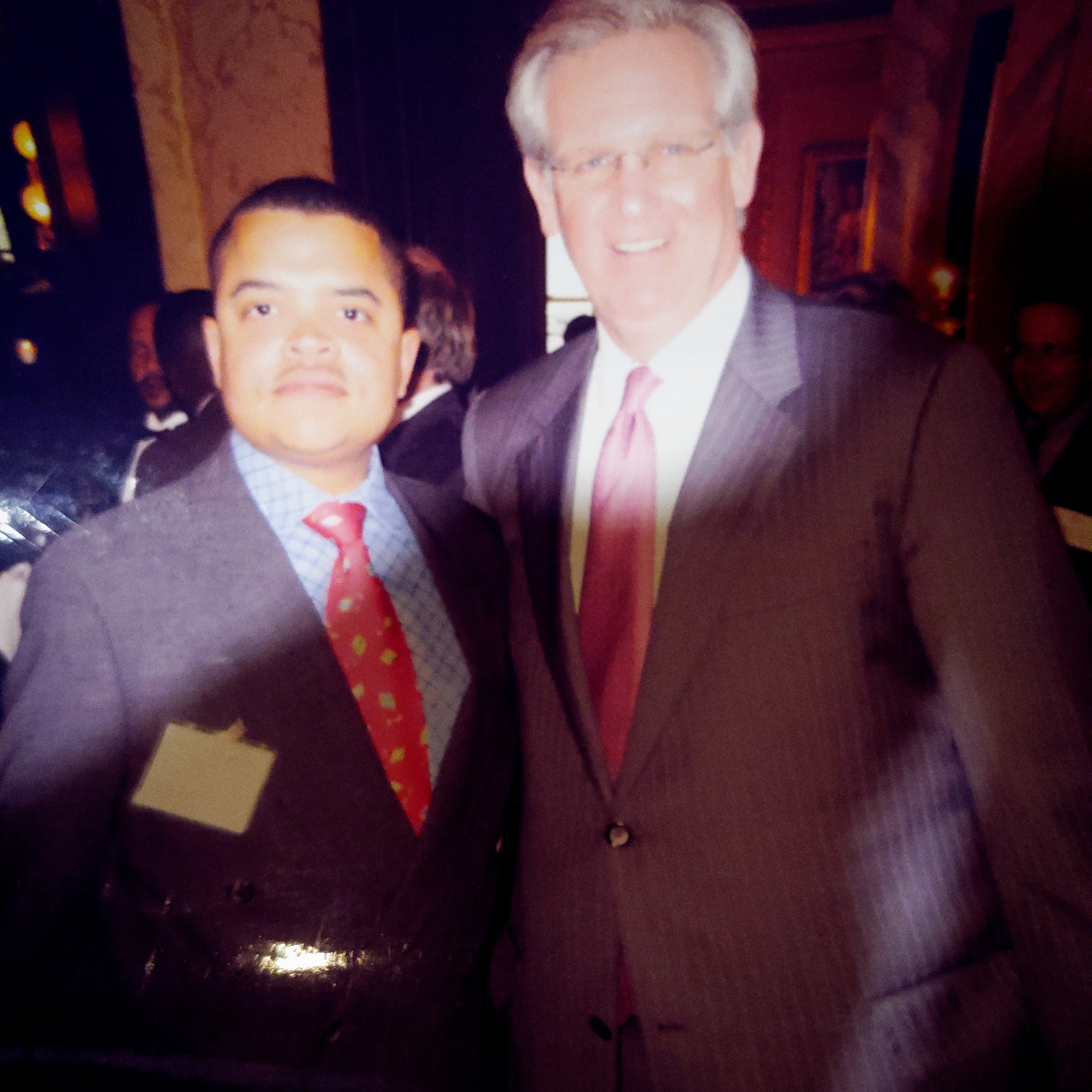
Working With Governor Nixon Was A Highlight
