= Mike Leara =

American businessman and politician

Member of the Missouri House of Representatives from the 96th district
- In office 2009–2017
- Succeeded by: David Gregory

Personal details
- Born: March 27, 1960 (age 66) St. Louis, Missouri
- Party: Republican
- Profession: businessman

Mike Leara (born March 27, 1960) is an American businessman and politician. He was a member of the Missouri House of Representatives, having served from 2009 to 2017. Leara is a member of the Republican party.
