= Albert Joseph Liese =

American politician (born 1940)

Member of the Missouri House of Representatives from the 79th district
- In office 2003–2011
- Succeeded by: Mary Nichols

Personal details
- Born: March 24, 1940 (age 86)
- Party: Democratic
- Education: University of Chicago; Washington University in St. Louis

Albert Joseph Liese (born March 24, 1940) is an American politician. He was member of the Missouri House of Representatives for the 79th district.
