= Gary Kelly (politician) =

American politician

Member of the Missouri House of Representatives
- In office 2000–2004
- Succeeded by: Bob Nance

Personal details
- Born: June 23, 1962 (age 64) Cameron, Missouri, U.S.
- Party: Democratic
- Education: Asbury Theological Seminary; University of Central Missouri

Gary Kelly (born June 23, 1962) is an American politician.

Kelly was born on June 23, 1962, in Cameron, Missouri, and raised on a farm near Kidder. He graduated from Hamilton's Penney High School in 1980 and studied broadcasting and film at Central Missouri State University, and later attended Asbury Theological Seminary.

Prior to pursuing political office, Kelly was a police officer.

Kelly was first elected to the Missouri House of Representatives in 2000, defeating District 36 incumbent Rodger Fitzwater in a Democratic Party primary, then winning the general election uncontested. Kelly was unopposed during the 2002 general election, after facing Excelsior Springs mayor pro-term Benny Ward in a primary election. Kelly won his third primary contest in 2004, against Jerry McCarter, then subsequently lost the general election to Bob Nance.
