= Jay Houghton =

American politician

Jay D. Houghton

Member of the Missouri House of Representatives from the 43rd district
- In office January 2011 – January 9, 2019
- Preceded by: Terry L. Witte
- Succeeded by: Kent Hayden

Personal details
- Born: October 27, 1966 (age 59) Kansas City, Missouri
- Party: Republican
- Education: University of Missouri
- Profession: Agribusiness

Jay Houghton (born October 27, 1966) is a Republican former member of the Missouri House of Representatives. Houghton was elected in 2010 to represent the 10th District, encompassing all or parts of Pike, Audrain, Callaway, Lincoln, Montgomery and Ralls counties. In November 2012 Houghton filed for election in the newly created Missouri House 43rd District, which contains all of Audrain and portions of Callaway counties.

== Personal history ==
Jay D. Houghton was born in Kansas City, Missouri and raised near Monticello, Missouri. He graduated Highland High School in 1984 and attended the University of Missouri. Houghton has two sons, Tyler and Hunter. When not involved with legislative duties Houghton works as a manager at McCaw Farms. He is a member of the National Rifle Association of America (NRA), Missouri Sport Shooting Association, Missouri Farm Bureau, and Audrain County Pork Association.

== Political history ==
Jay Houghton has a long family history of involvement in state politics. He is the nephew of current 18th District State Senator Brian Munzlinger. Houghton's great-great-grandfather and two great-uncles also served as State Representatives. Prior to entering state politics Jay Houghton served on the Martinsburg, Missouri City Council and as town mayor. Houghton ran in 2010 to replace the term-limited Terry Witte, first defeating Dudley Michael Duke in the August Republican primary, then beating Democrat Linda Witte, Terry's wife, and Constitution Party candidate Josh Allum in the November General Election.

Missouri 10th District State Representative Election 2010
Party	Candidate	Votes	%	±%
Republican	Jay Houghton	5,865	54.3	Winner
Democratic	Linda Witte	4,307	39.8	
Constitution	Josh Allum	638	5.9	

Missouri 43rd District State Representative Election 2012
Party	Candidate	Votes	%	±%
Republican	Jay Houghton	8,792	63.9	Winner
Democratic	Ed Lockwood	4,959	36.1	

After the 2011 Regular Legislative Session Houghton received a Freshman Legislator of the Year Award for his work with Sportsman's Issues by Speaker of the House Steven Tilley. Houghton also received a Friend of Manufacturing Award from the Associated Industries of Missouri. Houghton won another Freshman Legislator of the Year Award for Agricultural Issues in 2012. In 2013, Houghton was the only Missouri Representative to win a state YMCA award, winning in the "Healthy Living" category for his work with the Pike County/Twin Pikes YMCA.

=== Legislative assignments ===
Rep. Houghton will serve on the following committees during the 97th General Assembly:

- Agri-business
- General Laws
- Vice-Chairman, Tourism and Natural Resources
- Vice-Chairman, Agriculture Policy
- Missouri Sportsman Issue Development
- Issue Development Standing Committee on Worker's Freedom

Houghton previously served on:

- Health-Care Policy
- Vice-Chairman, Special Standing Committee on Disability Services

==== Legislation ====
Regular Session 2011:

Rep. Houghton sponsored House Bill 831, which would allow the Missouri Attorney General's office to create a "Do-Not-Offer Statewide Registry". The registry, similar in ways to a "Do Not Call" list, would allow registered Missourians age seventy and older to block receiving direct mail advertising.

Representative Houghton was also involved in two pieces of legislation that were passed in the session. One requires the Missouri State Attorney General's Office to provide transparency in private attorney contracts. Another allows members of the National Wild Turkey Federation to purchase organization specific license plates through the Missouri Department of Revenue.

Regular Session 2012:

Houghton filed legislation to establish a statewide School Bus Safety Week to give districts the opportunity to review safety procedures and policies, as well as to ensure that all students and parents understand them. He also filed bills to strengthen the punishments and standards on certain agricultural crimes and impersonation of public servants, and another to force the Department of Conservation to make public their violation and point system.

Regular Session 2013:

Representative Houghton filed HB 667 & HJR 29, seeking to make Constitutional changes to the Office of Agriculture, effectively making the Agriculture Director an election position. Houghton also filed HCR 34, a call for Congress and the USDA to re-evaluate the "Healthy Hunger-Free Kids Act of 2010" and the limitations that it puts on the school lunch program
