= Jason R. Brown =

American politician

Jason R. Brown (born July 22, 1970) is a Republican and small business owner who currently serves as deputy majority whip of the Missouri House of Representatives. He resides with his wife, Rachelle, and their two children, Alayna and Caleb, in Platte City, Missouri.

He received a B.S. degree in government from Northwest Missouri State University in 1993, and a master's degree in Public Administration in Drake University in 1994. He served in the military, and currently serves in the Army reserves. From 1998 to 2001, he worked as the public works director of Platte City. He is a member of VFW Post 4055.

He was first elected to the Missouri House of Representatives in 2002, winning reelection in 2004. He serves on the following committees:

- Crime Prevention and Public Safety (vice chair),
- Conservation and Natural Resources, and
- Local Government.

On Friday October 6, 2006, it was reported Brown was shot by a sniper while serving in Iraq with the US Army Reserves.
