= Jean Peters-Baker =

American politician

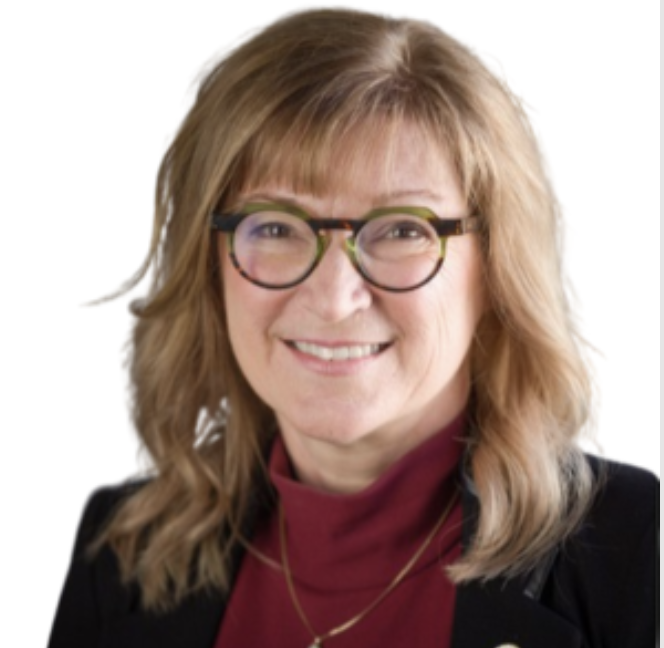

Member of the Missouri House of Representatives from the 39th district
- In office January 2011 – May 6, 2011

Jackson County Prosecutor
- In office 2011 – January 1, 2025
- Succeeded by: Melesa Johnson

Personal details
- Party: Democratic
- Education: University of Missouri-Columbia; University of Missouri

Jean Peters-Baker is an American politician. She was member of the Missouri House of Representatives for the 39th district.

She later served as Jackson County Prosecutor.
