= Ed Wildberger =

American politician

Member of the Missouri House of Representatives from the 27th district
- In office January 2003 – February 2009
- Preceded by: Glenda Kelly
- Succeeded by: Pat Conway

Personal details
- Born: August 13, 1949 (age 77) St. Joseph, Missouri
- Party: Democratic Party
- Spouse: Connie
- Education: Johnson County Community College
- Occupation: Firefighter, retired

Ed Wildberger is a former Democratic member of the Missouri House of Representatives. He represented District 27 from 2003 to 2009, and even served as Minority Caucus Chairman. On November 2, 2009, Missouri Governor Jay Nixon appointed Wildberger as the Recorder of Deeds for Buchanan County, Missouri. Wildberger was replaced in the State House by Democrat Pat Conway after a special election. He then went on to win reelection to the Recorder position in 2010. He was reelected in 2014, and lost a bid for reelection in 2018.

Wildberger is also a small business owner, and a retired fire department member. He resides in St. Joseph, Missouri.

He was born in St. Joseph, graduated Lafayette High School in 1968, and attended Johnson County Community College. He was a member of the St. Joseph Fire Department for 29 years, during which time he was promoted up to battalion chief. He served as St. Joseph's emergency management director from 1991 to 2002, and was named the St. Joseph Employee of the Year for 1993, for leading the city's response to the Great Flood of 1993.

He is a member of the Missouri State Western Advisory Board, the Moila Shrine Temple Charity Lodge, the IAFF Local #77, and the Missouri State Council of Firefighters.

He was first elected to the Missouri House of Representatives in 2002, and won reelection in 2004 and 2006. As a member of the House he sat on the following committees:

- Administration and Accounts,
- Appropriations - Public Safety and Corrections, and
- Budget.
