= Bert Atkins (politician) =

American politician (born 1955)

Member of the Missouri House of Representatives from the 75th district
- In office 2009–2013

Personal details
- Born: April 19, 1955 (age 71)
- Party: Democratic

Bert Atkins (born April 19, 1955) is an American politician. He was member of the Missouri House of Representatives for the 75th district.
