= Curt Dougherty =

American politician (born 1956)

Member of the Missouri House of Representatives from the 53rd district
- In office 2003–2011
- Succeeded by: Brent Lasater

Personal details
- Born: December 13, 1956 (age 69)
- Party: Democratic

Curt Dougherty (born December 13, 1956) is an American politician. He was member of the Missouri House of Representatives for the 53rd district.

He later served as a councilman in Independence, Missouri.
