= Delus Johnson =

American politician

Member of the Missouri House of Representatives from the 9th district
- In office 2010 – January 2019
- Succeeded by: Sheila Solon

Personal details
- Born: October 28, 1965 (age 60)
- Party: Republican

Delus Keith Johnson (born October 28, 1965) is an American politician. He was a member of the Missouri House of Representatives from the 9th District, serving from 2010 to 2019, a member of the Republican Party. As of 2022, he is running for Missouri Senate District 12.
