= Gary Dusenberg =

American politician

Member of the Missouri House of Representatives from the 54th district
- In office January 8, 2003 – January 5, 2011
- Preceded by: Don Lograsso
- Succeeded by: Jeanie Lauer

Personal details
- Born: July 5, 1946 (age 80)
- Party: Republican

Gary Dusenberg (born July 5, 1946) is an American politician who served in the Missouri House of Representatives from the 54th district from 2003 to 2011.
