= Pat Conway (politician) =

American politician

Member of the Missouri House of Representatives from the 10th district
- In office 2010 – January 2019
- Preceded by: Ed Wildberger
- Succeeded by: Bill Falkner III

Personal details
- Born: October 8, 1947 (age 79) St. Joseph, Missouri, United States
- Party: Democratic

Pat Conway (born October 8, 1947) is an American politician. He was a member of the Missouri House of Representatives from the 10th District from 2010 to 2019. He is a member of the Democratic Party.
