= Vicki A. Schneider =

American politician

Member of the Missouri House of Representatives from the 17th district
- In office January 5, 2011 – January 9, 2013
- Preceded by: Kenny Biermann
- Succeeded by: Myron Neth
- In office January 20, 2003 – January 3, 2009
- Preceded by: Bruce W. Holt
- Succeeded by: Kenny Biermann

Personal details
- Born: August 12, 1957 (age 69) St. Louis, Missouri
- Party: Republican
- Spouse: Michael
- Education: St. Mary's College
- Profession: Real estate developer

Vicki Schneider (born August 12, 1957) is a former Republican member of the Missouri House of Representatives. Schneider represented the 17th District which encompasses portions of St. Charles County, Missouri. She was first elected to the Missouri House in 2002. Schneider served four terms in the Missouri House of Representatives, the most allowed by term limits.

== Early life, education and career ==
Vicki Schneider was born in St. Louis, Missouri, graduating from Fort Zumwalt High School in O'Fallon in 1976. Following high school Schneider then attended St. Mary's College in O'Fallon. When not attending to legislative duties she is the president of Schneider Construction Company, and Schneider Properties—businesses co-founded with her husband. Schneider and husband Michael are the parents of two children, a son and a daughter, and one grandson.

=== Civic activities ===
Representative Schneider is a member of the Custom Builders Guild, Home Builders Association, St. Charles Board of Realtors, 1904 World Fair Charitable Foundation, Committee for Parkinson's Disease, and O'Fallon Community Foundation. She is on the Board of Directors for the Boys & Girls Clubs of St. Charles. Schneider was named Leukemia Society Woman of the Year in 1996 and 1998.

== Politics ==
Vicki Schneider was first elected to the Missouri House of Representatives in 2002, winning reelection in 2004 and 2006. Schneider lost a close reelection race to Democrat Kenny Biermann in November, 2008. She made an abortive run for O'Fallon mayor in 2009 but ended her campaign in under two weeks. Schneider defeated Biermann in a rematch election in November 2010. She could not run again for the Missouri House in 2012 due to term limits. Among her most notable legislative achievements is sponsoring the bill which created Missouri's Amber alert system.

== Electoral history ==
=== State representative ===
Missouri House of Representatives Primary Election, August 6, 2002, District 17
Party	Candidate	Votes	%	±%
Republican	Vicki Schneider	2,498	100.00%	

Missouri House of Representatives Election, November 5, 2002, District 17
Party	Candidate	Votes	%	±%
Republican	Vicki Schneider	6,027	50.27%	+2.33
Democratic	Aaron M. Staebell	5,962	49.73%	−2.33

Missouri House of Representatives Election, November 2, 2004, District 17
Party	Candidate	Votes	%	±%
Republican	Vicki Schneider	10,510	56.70%	+6.43
Democratic	Matt Schmitz	8,027	43.30%	−6.43

Missouri House of Representatives Election, November 7, 2006, District 17
Party	Candidate	Votes	%	±%
Republican	Vicki Schneider	7,796	50.96%	−5.74
Democratic	Kenny Biermann	7,501	49.04%	+5.74

Missouri House of Representatives Election, November 4, 2008, District 17
Party	Candidate	Votes	%	±%
Republican	Vicki Schneider	10,877	49.83%	1.13
Democratic	Kenny Biermann	10,950	50.17%	+1.13

Missouri House of Representatives Election, November 2, 2010, District 17
Party	Candidate	Votes	%	±%
Republican	Vicki Schneider	8,104	55.66%	+5.83
Democratic	Kenny Biermann	6,456	44.34%	−5.83

=== State Senate ===
Missouri Senate Primary Election, August 5, 2014, District 2
Party	Candidate	Votes	%	±%
Republican	Bob Onder	14,305	63.57%	
Republican	Vicki Schneider	4,561	20.27%	
Republican	Chuck Gatschenberger	3,635	16.16%	
