= Sue Allen =

American politician (born 1947)

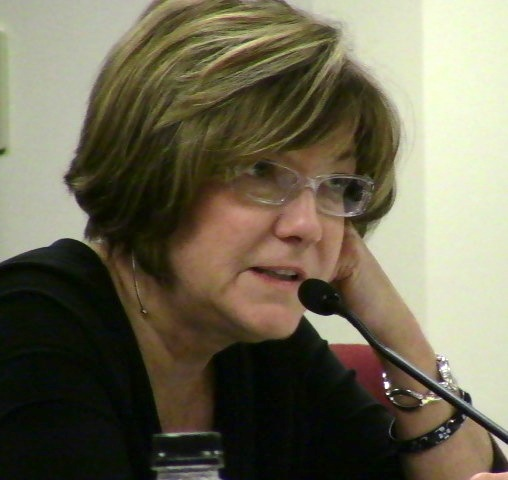
- Allen in 2010

Member of the Missouri House of Representatives from the 100th district
- In office 2009–2017
- Preceded by: Marsha Haefner
- Succeeded by: Derek Grier

Personal details
- Born: April 17, 1947 (age 79) Oskaloosa, Iowa
- Party: Republican
- Spouse: Mike
- Children: 2
- Profession: Physical therapist

Sue Allen (born April 17, 1947) is an American politician. She was a member of the Missouri House of Representatives from 2009 to 2017. She is a member of the Republican Party.
