= Eileen Grant McGeoghegan =

American politician (1953–2022)

Member of the Missouri House of Representatives from the 77th district
- In office 2011–2013
- Preceded by: Michael George Corcoran
- Succeeded by: Kimberly Gardner

Personal details
- Born: July 22, 1953
- Died: April 7, 2022 (aged 68)
- Party: Democratic
- Education: University of Missouri-Columbia; University of Missouri

Eileen M. Grant McGeoghegan (née Grant; July 22, 1953 – April 7, 2022) was an American politician. She was member of the Missouri House of Representatives for the 77th district.

She was a candidate for District 73 in the 2016 Missouri House of Representatives election.
