= Doug Ervin =

American politician

Member of the Missouri House of Representatives from the 35th district
- In office 2003–2011
- Succeeded by: TJ Berry

Personal details
- Party: Republican

Doug Ervin is an American politician. He was member of the Missouri House of Representatives for the 35th district.

In 2019, Ervin ran for Clay County Eastern Commissioner.
