= Brian Yates =

American politician

Member of the Missouri House of Representatives from the 119th district
- In office 2002 – December 1, 2009

Personal details
- Party: Republican

Brian Yates is an American politician. He was member of the Missouri House of Representatives for the 119th district.
