= Terry L. Witte =

American politician

Terry Witte
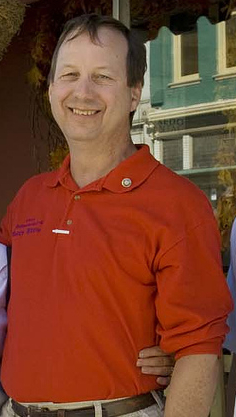

Member of the Missouri House of Representatives from the 10th district
- In office 2002–2010
- Succeeded by: Jay Houghton

Personal details
- Born: September 28, 1952 (age 73) Montgomery City, Missouri, U.S.
- Party: Democratic
- Children: 2
- Education: University of Missouri (BS, JD)

Military service
- Branch/service: United States Army
- Years of service: 1972–1974

Terry L. Witte (born September 28, 1952) is an American attorney and politician who served as a Democratic member of the Missouri House of Representatives for the 10th district, which includes Pike County and parts of Lincoln, Audrain, Callaway, and Montgomery counties.

== Early life and education ==
He was born in Montgomery City, Missouri, and served in the United States Army from 1972 to 1974. He went on to the University of Missouri, where he received a Bachelor of Science in education in 1977 and a Juris Doctor in 1980.

== Career ==
Witte operates a law practice in Vandalia, Missouri. He was first elected to the Missouri House of Representatives in 2002, winning reelection in 2004, 2006, and 2008. Witte was term-limited from running for the House in 2010, and his wife Linda ran instead. She was defeated by Jay Houghton. Witte served as deputy minority whip for his first two terms.

== Personal life ==
He is a member of the Vandalia United Methodist Church, the Vandalia Rotary Club, Quail Unlimited, the National Rifle Association of America, and the Missouri Military Preparedness and Enhancement Commission.

Witte resides in Vandalia, Missouri, with his wife, Linda. They have two children.
