= Chris Carter (Missouri politician) =

Missouri politician

Member of the Missouri House of Representatives from the 61st district
- In office 2009–2012
- Succeeded by: Dave Schatz

Personal details
- Party: Democratic

Chris Carter is an American politician who served as a member of the Missouri House of Representatives for the 61st district from 2009 to 2012.

He was a member of the St. Louis Board of Aldermen from 2012 to 2017.
