= TJ Berry =

American politician

Member of the Missouri House of Representatives from the 38th district
- In office 2011 – January 9, 2019
- Preceded by: Doug Ervin
- Succeeded by: Doug Richey

Personal details
- Born: September 11, 1965 (age 60) North Kansas City, Missouri
- Party: Republican
- Spouse: Shelly
- Children: two
- Profession: Businessman

TJ Berry (born September 11, 1965) is an American politician who served as a Republican member of the Missouri House of Representatives from 2012 to 2019.
