= Don Phillips (American politician) =

American politician

Member of the Missouri House of Representatives from the 138th district
- In office 2011–2018
- Preceded by: Nita Jane Ayres
- Succeeded by: Brad Hudson

Personal details
- Born: May 7, 1951 (age 75) St. Louis, Missouri
- Party: Republican
- Spouse: Heather
- Children: two
- Profession: State Trooper

Donald Phillips (born May 7, 1951) is an American politician. He is a former member of the Missouri House of Representatives, having served since 2011. He is a member of the Republican party. He resigned in 2018 after being appointed to the Missouri parole board.
