= Kathie Conway =

American politician (1955–2024)

Member of the Missouri House of Representatives from the 104th district
- In office January 2013 – January 9, 2019
- Preceded by: Joseph Fallert
- Succeeded by: Adam Schnelting

Member of the Missouri House of Representatives from the 14th district
- In office January 2011 – January 2013
- Preceded by: Joe Smith
- Succeeded by: Ron Schieber

Personal details
- Born: February 8, 1955 Jerseyville, Illinois, U.S.
- Died: August 24, 2024 (aged 69)
- Party: Republican
- Spouse: Patrick Conway
- Education: Western Illinois University
- Profession: Civil and criminal investigator

Kathie Conway (February 8, 1955 – August 24, 2024) was an American politician who was a Republican member of the Missouri House of Representatives. Conway represented the 104th District, which encompasses portions of St. Charles County, Missouri. She was first elected to the Missouri House in November 2010.

== Background ==
Conway was born in Jerseyville, Illinois, on February 8, 1955. She graduated from Alton Senior High School in 1973. Following graduation she attended Western Illinois University in Macomb, earning a bachelor's degree Law Enforcement Administration in 1977. Prior to entering politics Conway was a civil and criminal investigator in the St. Louis and eastern Missouri areas. She and husband Patrick were parents of one son.

Conway died from brain cancer on August 24, 2024, at the age of 69.

== Politics ==
Conway was a newcomer to elected politics when she decided to run for the 14th District Missouri House seat in 2010. Republican incumbent Joe Smith was term-limited from serving again. Conway ran unopposed in the August primary, then defeated Democrat Kyle Meadows in the November general election.

=== Legislative assignments ===
Representative Conway served on the following committees:

- Appropriations - Public Safety and Corrections, Chairman
- Select Budget Committee
- Fiscal Review
- Crime Prevention and Public Safety
- Joint Committee on Government Oversight – Vice Chair

== Electoral history ==
Missouri House of Representatives — District 104 — St. Charles County (2016)
Party	Candidate	Votes	%	±%
Republican	Kathie Conway	12,318	63.55%	+0.41
Democratic	Peggy Sherwin	7,064	36.45%	−0.41

Missouri House of Representatives — District 104 — St. Charles County (2014)
Party	Candidate	Votes	%	±%
Republican	Kathie Conway	5,852	63.14%	+6.78
Democratic	Terry Lesinski	3,417	36.86%	−6.78

Missouri House of Representatives — District 104 — St. Charles County (2012)
Party	Candidate	Votes	%	±%
Republican	Kathie Conway	9.834	56.36%	
Democratic	Terry Lesinski	7,614	43.64%	

Missouri 14th District State Representative Election 2010
Party	Candidate	Votes	%	±%
Republican	Kathie Conway	8,886	66.2	Winner
Democratic	Kyle Meadows	4,542	33.8	
