= Sue Schoemehl =

American politician

Member of the Missouri House of Representatives from the 100th district
- In office 2003–2011
- Preceded by: Joan Barry
- Succeeded by: Marsha Haefner

Personal details
- Party: Democratic

Sue Schoemehl is an American politician. She was member of the Missouri House of Representatives for the 100th district.
