= Jason Grill =

American politician (born 1979)

Jason Grill (born August 10, 1979) is a radio host and former Democratic member of the Missouri House of Representatives.

Grill attended University of Missouri School of Law, Saint Louis University, and Loyola University Chicago.

== Second-term state representative ==
In Grill's second term in the Missouri House of Representatives, he sponsored and passed legislation that expanded access to autism diagnosis, treatment and therapy. The legislation was passed with the support of both parties. The bill allowed families to finally get the insurance coverage their children needed. Governor Nixon signed the autism bill into law.

== JGrill Media, Consulting, Attorney at Law ==
Grill is the owner of JGrill Media, LLC, where he focuses and consults on media relations and outreach, public relations and strategies, communications, marketing strategies, public/civic affairs and government relations. He also works as a local, state and national contributor, commentator and analyst. Grill writes for the Huffington Post, Politico, and the KC Business Magazine. He is a television political analyst for Fox 4 WDAF, and host of the Entrepreneur KC Show.
