= Ira Anders =

American politician (1942–2025)

Member of the Missouri House of Representatives from the 21st district
- In office January 7, 2013 – January 2019
- Preceded by: John W. Cauthorn
- Succeeded by: Robert Sauls

Member of the Missouri House of Representatives from the 51st district
- In office January 7, 2011 – January 5, 2013
- Succeeded by: Dean Dohrman

Personal details
- Born: April 15, 1942 Goessel, Kansas, U.S.
- Died: February 15, 2025 (aged 82) Independence, Missouri, U.S.
- Party: Democratic
- Education: Emporia State University

Ira Gene Anders (April 15, 1942 – February 15, 2025) was an American politician. He served as a Democratic member of the Missouri House of Representatives from the 21st district, being first elected in 2010 and having served to January 2019. Anders died on February 15, 2025, at the age of 82.
