= Stacey Newman =

American politician

Member of the Missouri House of Representatives from the 87th district
- In office 2009 – January 9, 2019
- Preceded by: Steve Brown
- Succeeded by: Ian Mackey

Personal details
- Born: August 20, 1954 (age 71)
- Party: Democratic

Stacey G. Newman (born August 20, 1954) is an American politician from the state of Missouri. A member of the Democratic Party, Newman served in the Missouri House of Representatives, representing District 87 from 2009 to 2019, and was Chair of the Missouri House Progressive Caucus.

== Political career ==
In 2000, Newman participated in the national Million Mom March in Washington, D.C., pushing for stronger gun control after her 6-year-old daughter Sophie appeared on The Rosie O'Donnell Show talking about her fear of guns in school. Newman helped form the St. Louis chapter of the Million Mom March and lobbied the general assembly for three years against concealed weapon legislation. Her husband, Burt Newman, attorney, challenged the concealed weapon law in the Missouri Supreme Court, after the veto of the bill by Governor Bob Holden was overridden.

=== Missouri House of Representatives ===
Newman was first elected to the Missouri House in a special election November 2009 after Steve Brown pleaded guilty to federal conspiracy charges and resigned his seat.

In 2015, Newman introduced a bill in the Missouri House to regulate firearms as strictly as the state regulates abortion, by adding a 72-hour waiting period.

=== Progress Woman ===
In 2011, Newman launched a website to engage progressive women in politics and recruit women candidates for public office.

=== Wesley Bell campaign ===
In 2024, Newman was a part of an effort to recruit a candidate to primary Cori Bush for the Missouri 1st congressional district in the US House of Representatives after Bush called for a ceasefire in the Gaza war. Following Wesley Bell's decision to enter the race, Newman joined the campaign as a coalitions director for Jewish outreach. Newman worked with Rabbi Jeffrey Abraham and Lisa Baron to build an outreach program for Jewish voters, including encouraging Orthodox Jews to vote Democrat and requesting absentee ballots for people living in Israel.

=== Missouri Alliance Network ===
Following the success of the Bell campaign, Newman formed political action committee Missouri Alliance Network with Abraham and other outreach partners from the campaign. Newman and Abraham told Jewish Insider that they encountered antisemitism in the campaign, including from local elected officials, that motivated them to form nonpartisan group. Among their efforts is supporting a bill to institute the IHRA definition of antisemitism in Missouri state law, and endorsing candidates who align with their views.

In the 2025 St. Louis mayoral race, Cara Spencer declined the group's endorsement, saying that she found Abraham's remarks about "no innocents in Gaza" on social media "troubling."
