= Kate Meiners =

American politician (born 1958)

Member of the Missouri House of Representatives from the 46th district
- In office 2003–2011
- Succeeded by: Kevin McManus

Personal details
- Born: December 31, 1958 (age 67)
- Party: Democratic
- Education: University of Central Missouri

Kate Meiners (born December 31, 1958) is an American politician. She was member of the Missouri House of Representatives for the 46th district.
