= Doug Funderburk =

American politician

Member of the Missouri House of Representatives from the 103rd district
- In office 2013–2015
- Preceded by: Self
- Succeeded by: John Wiemann

Member of the Missouri House of Representatives from the 12th district
- In office 2007–2013
- Preceded by: Sherman Parker
- Succeeded by: Self

Personal details
- Born: May 17, 1956 (age 70)
- Party: Republican
- Spouse: Denise
- Children: Brandon; Logan
- Education: Ranken Technical College
- Occupation: politician

Doug Funderburk (born May 17, 1956) is a Republican former member of the Missouri House of Representatives. He represented part of St. Charles County, in the 12th and 103rd districts, from 2007 to 2015.

== Early life and career ==
Doug Funderburk was born 1956. He received a degree in Instrumentation and Process Controls Technology from Ranken Technical College. He has worked for Boeing since 1982 and has been a member of the International Brotherhood of Electrical Workers Local #1 for 25 years. He is an active leader in the Boy Scouts of America, has a wife, two children, and attends the Church of the Rock.

== Political career ==
Doug Funderburk was elected to the St. Charles County Council in 1996 and served on the council until 2006. He spent seven years in the leadership of that body, including four years as chairman. In 2006, Funderburk was elected to the Missouri House of Representatives. He was then reelected in both 2008 and 2010. He served on the board of the Missouri Association of Counties. As a state representative he was one of only 39 state legislators to sign a 'no new taxes' pledge.

=== Committee assignments ===
- Joint Legislative Committee on Court Automation
- Elementary and Secondary Education
- Utilities (chairman)
- Economic Development
- Special Standing Committee on Emerging Issues in Health Care

== Electoral history ==
2012 General Election for Missouri's 103rd District House of Representatives
Party	Candidate	Votes	%	±%
Republican	Doug Funderburk	15,754	99.5	
Write-In	Kyle Schlereth	76	0.5	

2010 General Election for Missouri's 12th District House of Representatives
Party	Candidate	Votes	%	±%
Republican	Doug Funderburk	9,800	67.4	
Democratic	Richard Trueba	4,744	32.6	

2008 General Election for Missouri's 12th District House of Representatives
Party	Candidate	Votes	%	±%
Republican	Doug Funderburk	12,838	60.2	
Democratic	Richard Lesh	8,493	39.8	

2006 General Election for Missouri's 12th District House of Representatives
Party	Candidate	Votes	%	±%
Republican	Doug Funderburk	9,122	57.7	
Democratic	Sandra Lesh	6,674	42.3	
