= Galen Higdon =

American politician

Member of the Missouri House of Representatives from the 11th district
- In office 2011 – January 2019
- Succeeded by: Brenda Shields

Personal details
- Born: May 30, 1954 (age 72) St. Joseph, Missouri, United States
- Party: Republican

Galen W. Higdon (born May 30, 1954) is an American politician. He is a former member of the Missouri House of Representatives from the 11th district, having served from 2011 to 2019. He is a member of the Republican Party.
