= Gary Fuhr =

American politician (born 1947)

Member of the Missouri House of Representatives from the 97th district
- In office 2011–2013

Personal details
- Born: December 13, 1947 (age 78)
- Party: Republican

Gary Fuhr (born December 13, 1947) is an American politician. He was member of the Missouri House of Representatives for the 97th district.
