= Myron Neth =

American politician

Member of the Missouri House of Representatives from the 17th district
- In office January 9, 2013 – January 7, 2015
- Preceded by: Vicki A. Schneider
- Succeeded by: Nick King

Member of the Missouri House of Representatives from the 34th district
- In office January 5, 2011 – January 9, 2013
- Preceded by: Tim Flook
- Succeeded by: Jeff Grisamore

Personal details
- Born: November 20, 1968 (age 57) North Kansas City, Missouri
- Party: Republican

Myron Neth (born November 20, 1968) is an American politician who served in the Missouri House of Representatives from 2011 to 2015.
