= Kevin McManus (politician) =

American attorney and politician from the state of Missouri

Member of the Missouri House of Representatives from the 36th district
- In office 2010–2015
- Preceded by: Kate Meiners
- Succeeded by: DaRon McGee

Member of the Kansas City, Missouri City Council from the 6th district
- Incumbent
- Assumed office 2015

Kevin J. McManus (born November 3, 1978, in Kansas City, Missouri) is an American attorney. He previously served as a politician, being elected to the Missouri House of Representatives in 2010, and re-elected in 2012 and 2014. Subsequently, he served on the City Council of Kansas City, Missouri, from 2015 to 2023.

McManus has since returned to his legal career, establishing and practicing law at Kevin McManus Law, a firm specializing in personal injury and disability law.
