= Steve Ehlmann =

American politician

County Executive of St. Charles County, Missouri
- Incumbent
- Assumed office 2007
- Preceded by: Joe Ortwerth

Member of the Missouri Senate from the 23rd district
- In office 1993–2001
- Preceded by: Jeff Schaeperkoetter
- Succeeded by: Chuck Gross

Member of the Missouri House of Representatives from the 19th district
- In office 1989–1993
- Preceded by: Douglas F. Boschert
- Succeeded by: Charles Nordwald

Personal details
- Born: December 6, 1950 (age 75)
- Party: Republican
- Education: Furman University; University of Missouri; Washington University in St. Louis
- Occupation: Teacher, attorney

Steve E. Ehlmann (born December 6, 1950) is an American Republican politician who has served as St. Charles County executive since 2007. He has also served as a circuit judge and in the Missouri General Assembly in the Missouri Senate and the Missouri House of Representatives where he rose to the post of Senate minority floor leader.

Ehlmann graduated from Furman University with a bachelor's degree, from the University of Missouri with a master's degree in history, and from Washington University School of Law with a J.D. degree. He has worked as a public school teacher and a practicing attorney.

County Executive Election History

2022 St. Charles County Executive general election
Party	Candidate	Votes	%
Republican	Steve Ehlmann	110,601	96.10%
Write-in		4,488	3.90%

2018 St. Charles County Executive general election
Party	Candidate	Votes	%
Republican	Steve Ehlmann	104,258	62.06%
Democratic	Lorna Frahm	63,550	37.83%

2014 St. Charles County Executive general election
Party	Candidate	Votes	%
Republican	Steve Ehlmann	63,625	67.86%
Democratic	Rod Zerr	29,985	31.98%

2010 St. Charles County Executive general election
Party	Candidate	Votes	%
Republican	Steve Ehlmann	96,194	98.58%

2006 St. Charles County Executive general election
Party	Candidate	Votes	%
Republican	Steve Ehlmann	75,273	60.22%
Democratic	Jim Rutherford	49,668	39.74%
