= 2020 Missouri House of Representatives election =

2020 Missouri House of Representatives elections
- November 3, 2020

All 163 seats in the Missouri House of Representatives 82 seats needed for a majority
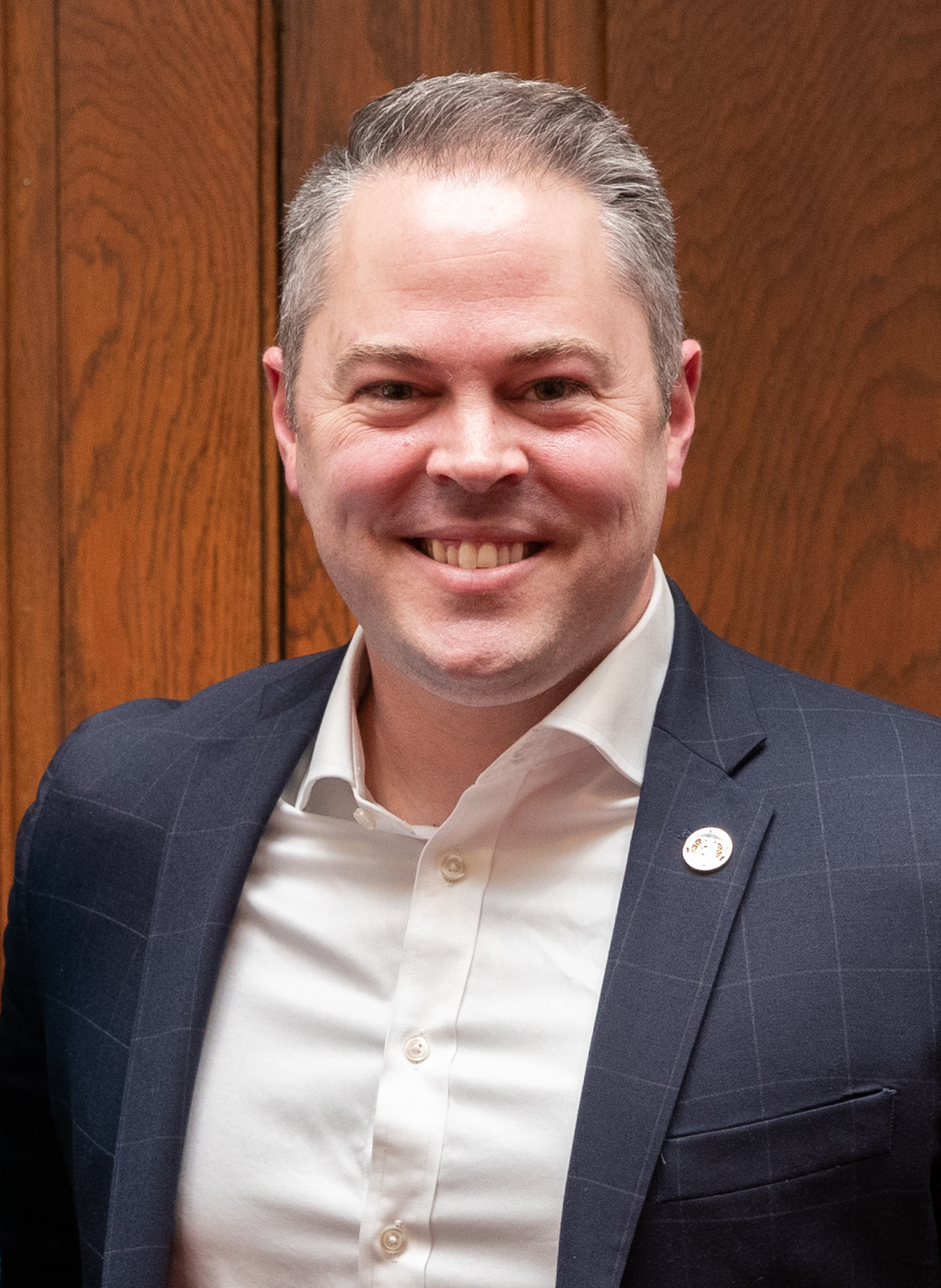

	Majority party	Minority party
Leader	Elijah Haahr (term-limited)	Crystal Quade
Party	Republican	Democratic
Leader's seat	134th district	132nd district
Seats before	113	48
Seats after	114	49
Seat change	▼1	▲1
Popular vote	1,732,426	1,016,563
Percentage	62.65%	36.76%
- Democratic gain Republican hold Democratic hold 50–60% 60–70% 70–80% 80–90% >90% 40–50% 50–60% 60–70% 70–80% 80–90% >90%
Speaker before election
Elijah Haahr
Republican
Elected Speaker
Rob Vescovo
Republican

The 2020 election for Missouri House of Representatives was held on November 3, 2020. All 163 seats in the state House were up for election in 2020. The primary election was held on August 31, 2020.

== Predictions ==
Source	Ranking	As of
The Cook Political Report	Likely R	October 21, 2020

== Closest races ==
Seats where the margin of victory was under 10%:

1. District 21, 0.2%
2. District 34, 0.4%
3. District 135, 0.5% (gain)
4. District 99, 2%
5. District 106, 2.8%
6. District 94, 5.8%
7. District 14, 6.8%
8. District 93, 7.2%
9. District 70, 8%
10. District 65, 8.2%
11. District 31, 8.8%
12. District 35, 9%

== Election results ==
=== District 1 ===
2020 Missouri House of Representatives general election District 1
Party	Candidate	Votes	%
Republican	Allen Andrews (incumbent)	14,724	100.0%
Total votes		14,724	100.0%
Republican hold			

=== District 2 ===
2020 Missouri House of Representatives general election District 2
Party	Candidate	Votes	%
Republican	J. Eggleston (incumbent)	12,838	83.1%
Democratic	Mindi Smith	2,607	16.9%
Total votes		15,445	100.0%
Republican hold			

=== District 3 ===
2020 Missouri House of Representatives general election District 3
Party	Candidate	Votes	%
Republican	Danny Busick (incumbent)	12,555	100.0%
Total votes		12,555	100.0%
Republican hold			

=== District 4 ===
2020 Missouri House of Representatives general election District 4
Party	Candidate	Votes	%
Republican	Greg Sharpe (incumbent)	13,613	100.0%
Total votes		13,613	100.0%
Republican hold			

=== District 5 ===
2020 Missouri House of Representatives general election District 5
Party	Candidate	Votes	%
Republican	Louis Riggs (incumbent)	15,530	100.0%
Total votes		15,530	100.0%
Republican hold			

=== District 6 ===
2020 Missouri House of Representatives general election District 6
Party	Candidate	Votes	%
Republican	Ed Lewis	13,064	76.9%
Democratic	Terrence Fiala	3,926	23.1%
Total votes		16,990	100.0%
Republican hold			

=== District 7 ===
2020 Missouri House of Representatives general election District 7
Party	Candidate	Votes	%
Republican	Rusty Black (incumbent)	14,134	100.0%
Total votes		14,134	100.0%
Republican hold			

=== District 8 ===
2020 Missouri House of Representatives general election District 8
Party	Candidate	Votes	%
Republican	Randy Railsback	16,561	100.0%
Total votes		16,561	100.0%
Republican hold			

=== District 9 ===
2020 Missouri House of Representatives general election District 9
Party	Candidate	Votes	%
Republican	Dean Van Schoiack	14,047	71.3%
Democratic	Karen Planalp	5,666	28.7%
Total votes		19,713	100.0%
Republican hold			

=== District 10 ===
2020 Missouri House of Representatives general election District 10
Party	Candidate	Votes	%
Republican	Bill Falkner (incumbent)	7,111	61.0%
Democratic	Colby Murphy	4,541	39.0%
Total votes		11,651	100.0%
Republican hold			

=== District 11 ===
2020 Missouri House of Representatives general election District 11
Party	Candidate	Votes	%
Republican	Brenda Shields (incumbent)	12,219	70.5%
Democratic	Brady Lee ODell	5,113	29.5%
Total votes		17,332	100.0%
Republican hold			

=== District 12 ===
2020 Missouri House of Representatives general election District 12
Party	Candidate	Votes	%
Republican	Josh Hurlbert	14,863	65.22%
Democratic	Wade Hugh Kiefer	7,926	34.78%
Total votes		22,789	100.0%
Republican hold			

=== District 13 ===
2020 Missouri House of Representatives general election District 13
Party	Candidate	Votes	%
Republican	Sean Pouche	14,054	56.6%
Democratic	Vic Abundis	10,774	43.4%
Total votes		24,828	100.0%
Republican hold			

=== District 14 ===
2020 Missouri House of Representatives general election District 14
Party	Candidate	Votes	%
Democratic	Ashley Aune	12,584	53.4%
Republican	Eric Holmes	10,985	46.6%
Total votes		23,569	100.0%
Democratic hold			

=== District 15 ===
2020 Missouri House of Representatives general election District 15
Party	Candidate	Votes	%
Democratic	Maggie Nurrenbern	10,581	58.0%
Republican	Steve West	7,624	42.0%
Total votes		18,205	100.0%
Democratic hold			

=== District 16 ===
2020 Missouri House of Representatives general election District 16
Party	Candidate	Votes	%
Republican	Chris Brown	15,638	57.5%
Democratic	James Shackelford	11,567	42.5%
Total votes		27,205	100.0%
Republican hold			

=== District 17 ===
2020 Missouri House of Representatives general election District 17
Party	Candidate	Votes	%
Democratic	Mark Ellebracht (incumbent)	10,497	55.6%
Republican	Brandt Vircks	8,378	44.4%
Total votes		18,875	100.0%
Democratic hold			

=== District 18 ===
2020 Missouri House of Representatives general election District 18
Party	Candidate	Votes	%
Democratic	Wes Rogers (incumbent)	13,737	100.0%
Total votes		13,737	100.0%
Democratic hold			

=== District 19 ===
2020 Missouri House of Representatives general election District 19
Party	Candidate	Votes	%
Democratic	Ingrid Burnett (incumbent)	7,026	100.0%
Total votes		7,026	100.0%
Democratic hold			

=== District 20 ===
2020 Missouri House of Representatives general election District 20
Party	Candidate	Votes	%
Republican	Bill Kidd (incumbent)	10,900	65.0%
Democratic	Mike Englert	5,800	35.0%
Total votes		16,700	100.0%
Republican hold			

=== District 21 ===
2020 Missouri House of Representatives general election District 21
Party	Candidate	Votes	%
Democratic	Robert Sauls (incumbent)	7,682	50.1%
Republican	Vicki Riley	7,637	49.9%
Total votes		15,319	100.0%
Democratic hold			

=== District 22 ===
2020 Missouri House of Representatives general election District 22
Party	Candidate	Votes	%
Democratic	Yolanda Young (incumbent)	11,757	100.0%
Total votes		11,757	100.0%
Democratic hold			

=== District 23 ===
2020 Missouri House of Representatives general election District 23
Party	Candidate	Votes	%
Democratic	Michael Johnson	8,756	100.0%
Total votes		8,576	100.0%
Democratic hold			

=== District 24 ===
2020 Missouri House of Representatives general election District 24
Party	Candidate	Votes	%
Democratic	Emily Weber	20,167	89.0%
Libertarian	Andrew Miller	2,501	11.0%
Total votes		22,668	100.0%
Democratic hold			

=== District 25 ===
2020 Missouri House of Representatives general election District 25
Party	Candidate	Votes	%
Democratic	Patty Lewis	21,273	100.0%
Total votes		21,273	100.0%
Democratic hold			

=== District 26 ===
2020 Missouri House of Representatives general election District 26
Party	Candidate	Votes	%
Democratic	Ashley Bland Manlove (incumbent)	15,201	100.0%
Total votes		15,201	100.0%
Democratic hold			

=== District 27 ===
2020 Missouri House of Representatives general election District 27
Party	Candidate	Votes	%
Democratic	Richard Brown (incumbent)	12,296	100.0%
Total votes		12,296	100.0%
Democratic hold			

=== District 28 ===
2020 Missouri House of Representatives general election District 28
Party	Candidate	Votes	%
Democratic	Jerome Barnes (incumbent)	13,128	100.0%
Total votes		13,128	100.0%
Democratic hold			

=== District 29 ===
2020 Missouri House of Representatives general election District 29
Party	Candidate	Votes	%
Democratic	Rory Rowland (incumbent)	13,422	99.9%
Write-In	Richard McKie	15	0.01%
Total votes		13,437	100.0%
Democratic hold			

=== District 30 ===
2020 Missouri House of Representatives general election District 30
Party	Candidate	Votes	%
Republican	Jonathan Patterson (incumbent)	12,850	57.3%
Democratic	Art Schaaf	9,591	42.7%
Total votes		22,441	100.0%
Republican hold			

=== District 31 ===
2020 Missouri House of Representatives general election District 31
Party	Candidate	Votes	%
Republican	Dan Stacy (incumbent)	10,888	54.4%
Democratic	Rhonda R Dolan	9,109	45.6%
Total votes		19,997	100.0%
Republican hold			

=== District 32 ===
2020 Missouri House of Representatives general election District 32
Party	Candidate	Votes	%
Republican	Jeff Coleman (incumbent)	17,129	100.0%
Total votes		17,129	100.0%
Republican hold			

=== District 33 ===
2020 Missouri House of Representatives general election District 33
Party	Candidate	Votes	%
Republican	Chris Sander	16,348	100.0%
Total votes		16,348	100.0%
Republican hold			

=== District 34 ===
2020 Missouri House of Representatives general election District 34
Party	Candidate	Votes	%
Republican	Rick Roeber	10,815	50.7%
Democratic	Chris Hager	10,514	49.3%
Total votes		21,329	100.0%
Republican hold			

=== District 35 ===
2020 Missouri House of Representatives general election District 35
Party	Candidate	Votes	%
Democratic	Keri Ingle (incumbent)	11,620	54.5%
Republican	Sean Smith	9,701	45.5%
Total votes		21,321	100.0%
Democratic hold			

=== District 36 ===
2020 Missouri House of Representatives general election District 36
Party	Candidate	Votes	%
Democratic	Mark Sharp (incumbent)	11,320	68.0%
Republican	Nola Wood	5,326	32.0%
Total votes		16,646	100.0%
Democratic hold			

=== District 37 ===
2020 Missouri House of Representatives general election District 37
Party	Candidate	Votes	%
Democratic	Annette Turnbaugh	11,271	56.1%
Republican	John D. Boyd Jr.	8,517	42.4%
Green	Daniel Karam	312	1.6%
Total votes		20,100	100.0%
Democratic hold			

=== District 38 ===
2020 Missouri House of Representatives general election District 38
Party	Candidate	Votes	%
Republican	Doug Richey (incumbent)	16,385	100.0%
Total votes		16,385	100.0%
Republican hold			

=== District 39 ===
2020 Missouri House of Representatives general election District 39
Party	Candidate	Votes	%
Republican	Peggy McGaugh (incumbent)	15,328	100.0%
Total votes		15,328	100.0%
Republican hold			

=== District 40 ===
2020 Missouri House of Representatives general election District 40
Party	Candidate	Votes	%
Republican	Chad Perkins	14,559	100.0%
Total votes		14,559	100.0%
Republican hold			

=== District 41 ===
2020 Missouri House of Representatives general election District 41
Party	Candidate	Votes	%
Republican	Randy Pietzman (incumbent)	18,148	100.0%
Total votes		18,148	100.0%
Republican hold			

=== District 42 ===
2020 Missouri House of Representatives general election District 42
Party	Candidate	Votes	%
Republican	Jeff Porter	17,316	100.0%
Total votes		17,316	100.0%
Republican hold			

=== District 43 ===
2020 Missouri House of Representatives general election District 43
Party	Candidate	Votes	%
Republican	Kent Haden (incumbent)	13,641	100.0%
Total votes		13,641	100.0%
Republican hold			

=== District 44 ===
2020 Missouri House of Representatives general election District 44
Party	Candidate	Votes	%
Republican	Cheri Toalson Reisch	10,737	59.4%
Democratic	Jacque Sample	7,348	40.6%
Total votes		18,085	100.0%
Republican hold			

=== District 45 ===
2020 Missouri House of Representatives general election District 45
Party	Candidate	Votes	%
Democratic	Kip Kendrick (incumbent)	11,627	100.0%
Total votes		11,627	100.0%
Democratic hold			

=== District 46 ===
2020 Missouri House of Representatives general election District 46
Party	Candidate	Votes	%
Democratic	Martha Stevens (incumbent)	16,043	100.0%
Total votes		16,043	100.0%
Democratic hold			

=== District 47 ===
2020 Missouri House of Representatives general election District 47
Party	Candidate	Votes	%
Republican	Chuck Basye (incumbent)	10,831	57.4%
Democratic	Adiran Plank	8,053	42.6%
Total votes		18,884	100.0%
Republican hold			

=== District 48 ===
2020 Missouri House of Representatives general election District 48
Party	Candidate	Votes	%
Republican	Tim Taylor	11,422	68.4%
Democratic	William (Bill) Betteridge	5,287	31.6%
Total votes		16,709	100.0%
Republican hold			

=== District 49 ===
2020 Missouri House of Representatives general election District 49
Party	Candidate	Votes	%
Republican	Travis Fitzwater (incumbent)	14,881	100.0%
Total votes		14,881	100.0%
Republican hold			

=== District 50 ===
2020 Missouri House of Representatives general election District 50
Party	Candidate	Votes	%
Republican	Sara Walash (incumbent)	15,395	62.4%
Democratic	Kari L. Chesney	9,290	37.6%
Total votes		24,685	100.0%
Republican hold			

=== District 51 ===
2020 Missouri House of Representatives general election District 51
Party	Candidate	Votes	%
Republican	Kurtis Gregory	10,803	75.3%
Libertarian	William Truman (Bill) Wayne	3,551	24.7%
Total votes		14,354	100.0%
Republican hold			

=== District 52 ===
2020 Missouri House of Representatives general election District 52
Party	Candidate	Votes	%
Republican	Brad Pollitt (incumbent)	12,626	100.0%
Total votes		12,626	100.0%
Republican hold			

=== District 53 ===
2020 Missouri House of Representatives general election District 53
Party	Candidate	Votes	%
Republican	Terry Thompson	12,288	67.6%
Democratic	Connie Simmons	4,170	22.9%
Independent	Aaron C. Mais	1,414	7.8%
Libertarian	Cameron Pack	316	1.7%
Total votes		18,188	100.0%
Republican hold			

=== District 54 ===
2020 Missouri House of Representatives general election District 54
Party	Candidate	Votes	%
Republican	Dan Houx (incumbent)	12,428	74.8%
Democratic	James Williams	4,184	25.2%
Total votes		16,612	100.0%
Republican hold			

=== District 55 ===
2020 Missouri House of Representatives general election District 55
Party	Candidate	Votes	%
Republican	Mike Haffner (incumbent)	18,583	100.0%
Total votes		18,583	100.0%
Republican hold			

=== District 56 ===
2020 Missouri House of Representatives general election District 56
Party	Candidate	Votes	%
Republican	Michael Davis	11,228	62.5%
Democratic	Neal Barnes	6,741	37.5%
Total votes		17,969	100.0%
Republican hold			

=== District 57 ===
2020 Missouri House of Representatives general election District 57
Party	Candidate	Votes	%
Republican	Rodger Reedy (incumbent)	15,600	100.0%
Total votes		15,600	100.0%
Republican hold			

=== District 58 ===
2020 Missouri House of Representatives general election District 58
Party	Candidate	Votes	%
Republican	Willard Haley	13,689	100.0%
Total votes		13,689	100.0%
Republican hold			

=== District 59 ===
2020 Missouri House of Representatives general election District 59
Party	Candidate	Votes	%
Republican	Rudy Veit (incumbent)	16,649	100.0%
Total votes		16,649	100.0%
Republican hold			

=== District 60 ===
2020 Missouri House of Representatives general election District 60
Party	Candidate	Votes	%
Republican	Dave Griffith (incumbent)	11,404	63.8%
Democratic	Joshua Dunne	6,483	36.2%
Total votes		17,887	100.0%
Republican hold			

=== District 61 ===
2020 Missouri House of Representatives general election District 61
Party	Candidate	Votes	%
Republican	Aaron Griesheimer (incumbent)	17,310	100.0%
Total votes		17,310	100.0%
Republican hold			

=== District 62 ===
2020 Missouri House of Representatives general election District 62
Party	Candidate	Votes	%
Republican	Bruce Sassmann	14,429	79.6%
Democratic	Nancy J. Ragan	3,703	20.4%
Total votes		18,132	100.0%
Republican hold			

=== District 63 ===
2020 Missouri House of Representatives general election District 63
Party	Candidate	Votes	%
Republican	Richard West (incumbent)	23,062	100.0%
Total votes		23,062	100.0%
Republican hold			

=== District 64 ===
2020 Missouri House of Representatives general election District 64
Party	Candidate	Votes	%
Republican	Tony Lovasco (incumbent)	15,954	68.9%
Democratic	Aaliyah Bailey	7,209	31.1%
Total votes		23,163	100.0%
Republican hold			

=== District 65 ===
2020 Missouri House of Representatives general election District 65
Party	Candidate	Votes	%
Republican	Tom Hannegan (incumbent)	10,779	54.1%
Democratic	Bill Otto	9,159	45.9%
Total votes		19,938	100.0%
Republican hold			

=== District 66 ===
2020 Missouri House of Representatives general election District 66
Party	Candidate	Votes	%
Democratic	Marlene Terry	11,655	100.0%
Total votes		11,655	100.0%
Democratic hold			

=== District 67 ===
2020 Missouri House of Representatives general election District 67
Party	Candidate	Votes	%
Democratic	Neil Smith	18,173	100.0%
Total votes		18,173	100.0%
Democratic hold			

=== District 68 ===
2020 Missouri House of Representatives general election District 68
Party	Candidate	Votes	%
Democratic	Jay Mosley (incumbent)	14,400	100.0%
Total votes		14,400	100.0%
Democratic hold			

=== District 69 ===
2020 Missouri House of Representatives general election District 69
Party	Candidate	Votes	%
Democratic	Gretchen Bangert (incumbent)	12,284	71.3%
Republican	Scott E. Cazadd	4,954	28.7%
Total votes		17,238	100.0%
Democratic hold			

=== District 70 ===
2020 Missouri House of Representatives general election District 70
Party	Candidate	Votes	%
Democratic	Paula Brown (incumbent)	10,275	54.0%
Republican	Jerry Adzima	8,755	46.0%
Total votes		19,030	100.0%
Democratic hold			

=== District 71 ===
2020 Missouri House of Representatives general election District 71
Party	Candidate	Votes	%
Democratic	LaDonna Appelbaum (incumbent)	14,404	100.0%
Total votes		14,404	100.0%
Democratic hold			

=== District 72 ===
2020 Missouri House of Representatives general election District 72
Party	Candidate	Votes	%
Democratic	Doug Clemens (incumbent)	9,865	61.4%
Republican	Darren L. Grant	6,188	38.6%
Total votes		16,053	100.0%
Democratic hold			

=== District 73 ===
2020 Missouri House of Representatives general election District 73
Party	Candidate	Votes	%
Democratic	Raychel Proudie (incumbent)	10,933	100.0%
Total votes		10,933	100.0%
Democratic hold			

=== District 74 ===
2020 Missouri House of Representatives general election District 74
Party	Candidate	Votes	%
Democratic	Michael Person (incumbent)	11,153	100.0%
Total votes		11,153	100.0%
Democratic hold			

=== District 75 ===
2020 Missouri House of Representatives general election District 75
Party	Candidate	Votes	%
Democratic	Alan Gray	13,247	100.0%
Total votes		13,247	100.0%
Democratic hold			

=== District 76 ===
2020 Missouri House of Representatives general election District 76
Party	Candidate	Votes	%
Democratic	Marlon Anderson	11,236	100.0%
Total votes		11,236	100.0%
Democratic hold			

=== District 77 ===
2020 Missouri House of Representatives general election District 77
Party	Candidate	Votes	%
Democratic	Kimberly-Ann Collins	12,537	100.0%
Total votes		12,537	100.0%
Democratic hold			

=== District 78 ===
2020 Missouri House of Representatives general election District 78
Party	Candidate	Votes	%
Democratic	Rasheen Aldridge Jr. (incumbent)	11,148	85.5%
Republican	Timothy Gartin	1,890	14.5%
Total votes		13,038	100.0%
Democratic hold			

=== District 79 ===
2020 Missouri House of Representatives general election District 79
Party	Candidate	Votes	%
Democratic	LaKeySha Frazier-Bosley (incumbent)	14,321	100.0%
Total votes		14,321	100.0%
Democratic hold			

=== District 80 ===
2020 Missouri House of Representatives general election District 80
Party	Candidate	Votes	%
Democratic	Peter Merideth (incumbent)	15,637	100.0%
Total votes		15,637	100.0%
Democratic hold			

=== District 81 ===
2020 Missouri House of Representatives general election District 81
Party	Candidate	Votes	%
Democratic	Steve Butz (incumbent)	11,461	100.0%
Total votes		11,461	100.0%
Democratic hold			

=== District 82 ===
2020 Missouri House of Representatives general election District 82
Party	Candidate	Votes	%
Democratic	Donna Baringer (incumbent)	14,702	73.6%
Republican	Robert J. Crump	5,283	26.4%
Total votes		19,985	100.0%
Democratic hold			

=== District 83 ===
2020 Missouri House of Representatives general election District 83
Party	Candidate	Votes	%
Democratic	Jo Doll	15,865	79.6%
Libertarian	Andrew Bolin	4,066	20.4%
Total votes		19,931	100.0%
Democratic hold			

=== District 84 ===
2020 Missouri House of Representatives general election District 84
Party	Candidate	Votes	%
Democratic	Wiley Price IV (incumbent)	13,191	100.0%
Total votes		13,191	100.0%
Democratic hold			

=== District 85 ===
2020 Missouri House of Representatives general election District 85
Party	Candidate	Votes	%
Democratic	Kevin Windham Jr. (incumbent)	12,651	100.0%
Total votes		12,651	100.0%
Democratic hold			

=== District 86 ===
2020 Missouri House of Representatives general election District 86
Party	Candidate	Votes	%
Democratic	Joe Adams	15,835	100.0%
Total votes		15,835	100.0%
Democratic hold			

=== District 87 ===
2020 Missouri House of Representatives general election District 87
Party	Candidate	Votes	%
Democratic	Ian Mackey (incumbent)	16,778	100.0%
Total votes		16,778	100.0%
Democratic hold			

=== District 88 ===
2020 Missouri House of Representatives general election District 88
Party	Candidate	Votes	%
Democratic	Tracy McCreery (incumbent)	13,924	62.8%
Republican	Karan Pujji	7,855	35.4%
Libertarian	Stephen R. Johnson	397	1.8%
Total votes		22,176	100.0%
Democratic hold			

=== District 89 ===
2020 Missouri House of Representatives general election District 89
Party	Candidate	Votes	%
Republican	Dean Plocher (incumbent)	15,200	59.6%
Democratic	Luke Barber	10,283	40.4%
Total votes		25,483	100.0%
Republican hold			

=== District 90 ===
2020 Missouri House of Representatives general election District 90
Party	Candidate	Votes	%
Democratic	Barbara Phifer (incumbent)	13,858	56.7%
Republican	Anne Landers	10,575	43.3%
Total votes		24,433	100.0%
Democratic hold			

=== District 91 ===
2020 Missouri House of Representatives general election District 91
Party	Candidate	Votes	%
Democratic	Sarah Unsicker (incumbent)	18,156	100.0%
Total votes		18,156	100.0%
Democratic hold			

=== District 92 ===
2020 Missouri House of Representatives general election District 92
Party	Candidate	Votes	%
Democratic	Michael Burton	11,030	55.5%
Republican	Bill Heisse	8,854	44.5%
Total votes		19,884	100.0%
Democratic hold			

=== District 93 ===
2020 Missouri House of Representatives general election District 93
Party	Candidate	Votes	%
Democratic	Bridget Walsh Moore	7,625	53.6%
Republican	Gabriel Jones	6,590	46.4%
Total votes		14,215	100.0%
Democratic hold			

=== District 94 ===
2020 Missouri House of Representatives general election District 94
Party	Candidate	Votes	%
Republican	Jim Murphy (incumbent)	9,595	52.9%
Democratic	Jean Pretto	8,566	47.1%
Total votes		18,161	100.0%
Republican hold			

=== District 95 ===
2020 Missouri House of Representatives general election District 95
Party	Candidate	Votes	%
Republican	Michael O'Donnell (incumbent)	12,691	59.3%
Democratic	Ann L Zimpfer	8,726	40.7%
Total votes		21,417	100.0%
Republican hold			

=== District 96 ===
2020 Missouri House of Representatives general election District 96
Party	Candidate	Votes	%
Republican	David Gregory (incumbent)	14,180	59.9%
Democratic	Erica Hoffman	9,475	40.1%
Total votes		23,655	100.0%
Republican hold			

=== District 97 ===
2020 Missouri House of Representatives general election District 97
Party	Candidate	Votes	%
Republican	Mary Elizabeth Coleman	14,539	100.0%
Total votes		14,539	100.0%
Republican hold			

=== District 98 ===
2020 Missouri House of Representatives general election District 98
Party	Candidate	Votes	%
Republican	Shamed Dogan (incumbent)	13,535	59.8%
Democratic	Angie Schaefer	9,088	40.2%
Total votes		22,623	100.0%
Republican hold			

=== District 99 ===
2020 Missouri House of Representatives general election District 99
Party	Candidate	Votes	%
Democratic	Trish Gunby (incumbent)	10,637	51.0%
Republican	Lee Ann Pitman	10,231	49.0%
Total votes		20,868	100.0%
Democratic hold			

=== District 100 ===
2020 Missouri House of Representatives general election District 100
Party	Candidate	Votes	%
Republican	Derek Grier (incumbent)	12,991	55.4%
Democratic	Helena Webb	10,448	44.6%
Total votes		23,439	100.0%
Republican hold			

=== District 101 ===
2020 Missouri House of Representatives general election District 101
Party	Candidate	Votes	%
Republican	Bruce DeGroot (incumbent)	17,762	100.0%
Total votes		17,762	100.0%
Republican hold			

=== District 102 ===
2020 Missouri House of Representatives general election District 102
Party	Candidate	Votes	%
Republican	Ron Hicks (incumbent)	14,080	62.4%
Democratic	Tracy Grundy	8,492	37.6%
Total votes		22,572	100.0%
Republican hold			

=== District 103 ===
2020 Missouri House of Representatives general election District 103
Party	Candidate	Votes	%
Republican	John Wiemann (incumbent)	14,342	63.2%
Democratic	Lisa Rees	8,349	36.8%
Total votes		22,691	100.0%
Republican hold			

=== District 104 ===
2020 Missouri House of Representatives general election District 104
Party	Candidate	Votes	%
Republican	Adam Schnelting (incumbent)	11,982	58.4%
Democratic	Jessica DeVoto	8,542	41.6%
Total votes		20,524	100.0%
Republican hold			

=== District 105 ===
2020 Missouri House of Representatives general election District 105
Party	Candidate	Votes	%
Republican	Phil Christofanelli (incumbent)	12,704	58.1%
Democratic	Christine Hyman	9,172	41.9%
Total votes		21,876	100.0%
Republican hold			

=== District 106 ===
2020 Missouri House of Representatives general election District 106
Party	Candidate	Votes	%
Republican	Adam Schwadron	9,620	51.4%
Democratic	Cindy Berne	9,079	48.6%
Total votes		21,876	100.0%
Republican hold			

=== District 107 ===
2020 Missouri House of Representatives general election District 107
Party	Candidate	Votes	%
Republican	Nick Schroer (incumbent)	12,344	59.7%
Democratic	Victoria Witt Datt	7,554	36.5%
Libertarian	Mike Copeland	773	3.7%
Total votes		20,671	100.0%
Republican hold			

=== District 108 ===
2020 Missouri House of Representatives general election District 108
Party	Candidate	Votes	%
Republican	Justin Hill (incumbent)	15,209	64.7%
Democratic	Susan Shumway	8,296	35.3%
Total votes		23,505	100.0%
Republican hold			

=== District 109 ===
2020 Missouri House of Representatives general election District 109
Party	Candidate	Votes	%
Republican	John Simmons (incumbent)	16,570	100.0%
Total votes		16,570	100.0%
Republican hold			

=== District 110 ===
2020 Missouri House of Representatives general election District 110
Party	Candidate	Votes	%
Republican	Dottie Bailey (incumbent)	14,227	65.3%
Democratic	John Kiehne	7,553	34.7%
Total votes		21,780	100.0%
Republican hold			

=== District 111 ===
2020 Missouri House of Representatives general election District 111
Party	Candidate	Votes	%
Republican	Shane Roden (incumbent)	13,308	70.9%
Democratic	Daniel (Vern) Cherry	5,470	29.1%
Total votes		18,778	100.0%
Republican hold			

=== District 112 ===
2020 Missouri House of Representatives general election District 112
Party	Candidate	Votes	%
Republican	Rob Vescovo (incumbent)	16,545	100.0%
Total votes		16,545	100.0%
Republican hold			

=== District 113 ===
2020 Missouri House of Representatives general election District 113
Party	Candidate	Votes	%
Republican	Dan Shaul (incumbent)	11,150	63.1%
Democratic	Terry Burgess	6,519	36.9%
Total votes		17,669	100.0%
Republican hold			

=== District 114 ===
2020 Missouri House of Representatives general election District 114
Party	Candidate	Votes	%
Republican	Becky Ruth (incumbent)	15,798	100.0%
Total votes		15,798	100.0%
Republican hold			

=== District 115 ===
2020 Missouri House of Representatives general election District 115
Party	Candidate	Votes	%
Republican	Cyndi Buchheit-Courtway	11,856	72.5%
Democratic	Cynthia D Nugent	4,494	27.5%
Total votes		16,350	100.0%
Republican hold			

=== District 116 ===
2020 Missouri House of Representatives general election District 116
Party	Candidate	Votes	%
Republican	Dale Wright (incumbent)	15,739	100.0%
Total votes		15,739	100.0%
Republican hold			

=== District 117 ===
2020 Missouri House of Representatives general election District 117
Party	Candidate	Votes	%
Republican	Mike Henderson (incumbent)	10,485	73.3%
Democratic	Tony Dorsett	3,817	26.7%
Total votes		14,302	100.0%
Republican hold			

=== District 118 ===
2020 Missouri House of Representatives general election District 118
Party	Candidate	Votes	%
Republican	Mike McGirl (incumbent)	14,016	100.0%
Total votes		14,016	100.0%
Republican hold			

=== District 119 ===
2020 Missouri House of Representatives general election District 119
Party	Candidate	Votes	%
Republican	Nate Tate (incumbent)	14,214	100.0%
Total votes		14,214	100.0%
Republican hold			

=== District 120 ===
2020 Missouri House of Representatives general election District 120
Party	Candidate	Votes	%
Republican	Jason Chipman (incumbent)	12,846	77.1%
Democratic	Theresa Schmitt	3,821	22.9%
Total votes		16,667	100.0%
Republican hold			

=== District 121 ===
2020 Missouri House of Representatives general election District 121
Party	Candidate	Votes	%
Republican	Don Mayhew (incumbent)	11,919	100.0%
Total votes		11,919	100.0%
Republican hold			

=== District 122 ===
2020 Missouri House of Representatives general election District 122
Party	Candidate	Votes	%
Republican	Bill Hardwick	6,133	69.3%
Democratic	Yvonne Reeves-Chong	2,717	30.7%
Total votes		8,850	100.0%
Republican hold			

=== District 123 ===
2020 Missouri House of Representatives general election District 123
Party	Candidate	Votes	%
Republican	Suzie Pollock (incumbent)	15,831	87.9%
Constitution	Pat Bellew	2,150	11.9%
Write-In	Nickalina (Nicki) Ray	23	0.1%
Total votes		18,004	100.0%
Republican hold			

=== District 124 ===
2020 Missouri House of Representatives general election District 124
Party	Candidate	Votes	%
Republican	Lisa Thomas	17,736	100.0%
Total votes		17,736	100.0%
Republican hold			

=== District 125 ===
2020 Missouri House of Representatives general election District 125
Party	Candidate	Votes	%
Republican	Jim Kalberloh	16,403	100.0%
Total votes		16,403	100.0%
Republican hold			

=== District 126 ===
2020 Missouri House of Representatives general election District 126
Party	Candidate	Votes	%
Republican	Patricia Pike (incumbent)	13,296	80.5%
Democratic	Jim Hogan	3,211	19.5%
Total votes		16,507	100.0%
Republican hold			

=== District 127 ===
2020 Missouri House of Representatives general election District 127
Party	Candidate	Votes	%
Republican	Ann Kelley (incumbent)	16,881	100.0%
Total votes		16,881	100.0%
Republican hold			

=== District 128 ===
2020 Missouri House of Representatives general election District 128
Party	Candidate	Votes	%
Republican	Mike Stephens (incumbent)	14,748	81.7%
Democratic	Marvin Manring	3,312	18.3%
Total votes		18,060	100.0%
Republican hold			

=== District 129 ===
2020 Missouri House of Representatives general election District 129
Party	Candidate	Votes	%
Republican	Jeff Knight (incumbent)	14,739	85.5%
Democratic	Dewanna (Dee) Marquez	2,501	14.5%
Total votes		17,240	100.0%
Republican hold			

=== District 130 ===
2020 Missouri House of Representatives general election District 130
Party	Candidate	Votes	%
Republican	Bishop Davidson	15,609	77.0%
Democratic	Dave Gragg	4,665	23.0%
Total votes		20,274	100.0%
Republican hold			

=== District 131 ===
2020 Missouri House of Representatives general election District 131
Party	Candidate	Votes	%
Republican	Bill Owen	10,827	65.7%
Democratic	Allison Schoolcraft	5,642	34.3%
Total votes		16,469	100.0%
Republican hold			

=== District 132 ===
2020 Missouri House of Representatives general election District 132
Party	Candidate	Votes	%
Democratic	Crystal Quade (incumbent)	6,289	59.3%
Republican	Sarah Semple	4,320	40.7%
Total votes		10,609	100.0%
Democratic hold			

=== District 133 ===
2020 Missouri House of Representatives general election District 133
Party	Candidate	Votes	%
Republican	Curtis Trent (incumbent)	13,037	65.0%
Democratic	Cindy Slimp	7,005	35.0%
Total votes		20,042	100.0%
Republican hold			

=== District 134 ===
2020 Missouri House of Representatives general election District 134
Party	Candidate	Votes	%
Republican	Alex Riley	10,469	55.8%
Democratic	Derrick Nowlin	8,291	44.2%
Total votes		18,760	100.0%
Republican hold			

=== District 135 ===
2020 Missouri House of Representatives general election District 135
Party	Candidate	Votes	%
Democratic	Betsy Fogle	8,555	48.3%
Republican	Steve Helms (incumbent)	8,476	47.8%
Green	Vicke Kepling	696	3.9%
Total votes		17,727	100.0%
Democratic gain from Republican			

=== District 136 ===
2020 Missouri House of Representatives general election District 136
Party	Candidate	Votes	%
Republican	Craig Fishel (incumbent)	13,739	58.6%
Democratic	Jeff Munzinger	9,709	41.4%
Total votes		23,448	100.0%
Republican hold			

=== District 137 ===
2020 Missouri House of Representatives general election District 137
Party	Candidate	Votes	%
Republican	John Black (incumbent)	17,381	78.0%
Democratic	Raymond Lampert	4,898	22.0%
Total votes		22,279	100.0%
Republican hold			

=== District 138 ===
2020 Missouri House of Representatives general election District 138
Party	Candidate	Votes	%
Republican	Brad Hudson (incumbent)	18,652	100.0%
Total votes		18,652	100.0%
Republican hold			

=== District 139 ===
2020 Missouri House of Representatives general election District 139
Party	Candidate	Votes	%
Republican	Jered Taylor (incumbent)	16,042	72.8%
Democratic	Darlene Graham	5,988	27.2%
Total votes		22,030	100.0%
Republican hold			

=== District 140 ===
2020 Missouri House of Representatives general election District 140
Party	Candidate	Votes	%
Republican	Tricia Derges	18,577	100.0%
Total votes		18,577	100.0%
Republican hold			

=== District 141 ===
2020 Missouri House of Representatives general election District 141
Party	Candidate	Votes	%
Republican	Hannah Kelly (incumbent)	15,221	100.0%
Total votes		15,221	100.0%
Republican hold			

=== District 142 ===
2020 Missouri House of Representatives general election District 142
Party	Candidate	Votes	%
Republican	Bennie Cook	13,282	100.0%
Total votes		13,282	100.0%
Republican hold			

=== District 143 ===
2020 Missouri House of Representatives general election District 143
Party	Candidate	Votes	%
Republican	Ron Copeland	13,661	100.0%
Total votes		13,661	100.0%
Republican hold			

=== District 144 ===
2020 Missouri House of Representatives general election District 144
Party	Candidate	Votes	%
Republican	Chris Dinkins (incumbent)	13,428	100.0%
Total votes		13,428	100.0%
Republican hold			

=== District 145 ===
2020 Missouri House of Representatives general election District 145
Party	Candidate	Votes	%
Republican	Rick Francis (incumbent)	14,751	84.4%
Democratic	Mike Lindley	2,736	15.6%
Total votes		17,487	100.0%
Republican hold			

=== District 146 ===
2020 Missouri House of Representatives general election District 146
Party	Candidate	Votes	%
Republican	Barry Hovis (incumbent)	21,012	100.0%
Total votes		21,012	100.0%
Republican hold			

=== District 147 ===
2020 Missouri House of Representatives general election District 147
Party	Candidate	Votes	%
Republican	Wayne Wallingford	10,167	63.1%
Democratic	Andy Leighton	5,935	36.9%
Total votes		16,102	100.0%
Republican hold			

=== District 148 ===
2020 Missouri House of Representatives general election District 148
Party	Candidate	Votes	%
Republican	Jamie Burger	13,740	100.0%
Total votes		13,740	100.0%
Republican hold			

=== District 149 ===
2020 Missouri House of Representatives general election District 149
Party	Candidate	Votes	%
Republican	Don Rone Jr. (incumbent)	10,675	100.0%
Total votes		10,675	100.0%
Republican hold			

=== District 150 ===
2020 Missouri House of Representatives general election District 150
Party	Candidate	Votes	%
Republican	Andrew McDaniel (incumbent)	9,762	100.0%
Total votes		9,762	100.0%
Republican hold			

=== District 151 ===
2020 Missouri House of Representatives general election District 151
Party	Candidate	Votes	%
Republican	Herman Morse (incumbent)	14,746	100.0%
Total votes		14,746	100.0%
Republican hold			

=== District 152 ===
2020 Missouri House of Representatives general election District 152
Party	Candidate	Votes	%
Republican	Hardy Billington (incumbent)	11,951	100.0%
Total votes		11,951	100.0%
Republican hold			

=== District 153 ===
2020 Missouri House of Representatives general election District 153
Party	Candidate	Votes	%
Republican	Darrell Atchison	14,943	100.0%
Total votes		14,943	100.0%
Republican hold			

=== District 154 ===
2020 Missouri House of Representatives general election District 154
Party	Candidate	Votes	%
Republican	David Evans (incumbent)	15,201	100.0%
Total votes		15,201	100.0%
Republican hold			

=== District 155 ===
2020 Missouri House of Representatives general election District 155
Party	Candidate	Votes	%
Republican	Travis Smith	15,299	84.8%
Democratic	Mike Lind	2,740	15.2%
Total votes		18,039	100.0%
Republican hold			

=== District 156 ===
2020 Missouri House of Representatives general election District 156
Party	Candidate	Votes	%
Republican	Brian Seitz	14,128	77.5%
Democratic	Dale Speelman	4,101	22.5%
Total votes		18,229	100.0%
Republican hold			

=== District 157 ===
2020 Missouri House of Representatives general election District 157
Party	Candidate	Votes	%
Republican	Mitch Boggs	14,890	100.0%
Total votes		14,890	100.0%
Republican hold			

=== District 158 ===
2020 Missouri House of Representatives general election District 158
Party	Candidate	Votes	%
Republican	Scott Cupps (incumbent)	12,962	81.4%
Democratic	Brenda McKinney	2,971	18.6%
Total votes		15,933	100.0%
Republican hold			

=== District 159 ===
2020 Missouri House of Representatives general election District 159
Party	Candidate	Votes	%
Republican	Dirk Deaton (incumbent)	13,854	100.0%
Total votes		13,854	100.0%
Republican hold			

=== District 160 ===
2020 Missouri House of Representatives general election District 160
Party	Candidate	Votes	%
Republican	Ben Baker (incumbent)	14,030	79.0%
Democratic	Angela Thomas	3,729	21.0%
Total votes		17,759	100.0%
Republican hold			

=== District 161 ===
2020 Missouri House of Representatives general election District 161
Party	Candidate	Votes	%
Republican	Lane Roberts (incumbent)	10,387	68.0%
Democratic	Joshua Shackles	4,876	32.0%
Total votes		15,263	100.0%
Republican hold			

=== District 162 ===
2020 Missouri House of Representatives general election District 162
Party	Candidate	Votes	%
Republican	Bob Bromley (incumbent)	14,606	100.0%
Total votes		14,606	100.0%
Republican hold			

=== District 163 ===
2020 Missouri House of Representatives general election District 163
Party	Candidate	Votes	%
Republican	Cody Smith (incumbent)	12,688	79.8%
Democratic	Aaron Hailey	3,218	20.2%
Total votes		15,906	100.0%
Republican hold			

== See also ==
- 2020 Missouri State Senate election
