= 2024 Missouri Senate election =

- November 5, 2024

17 odd-numbered districts in the Missouri Senate 18 seats needed for a majority
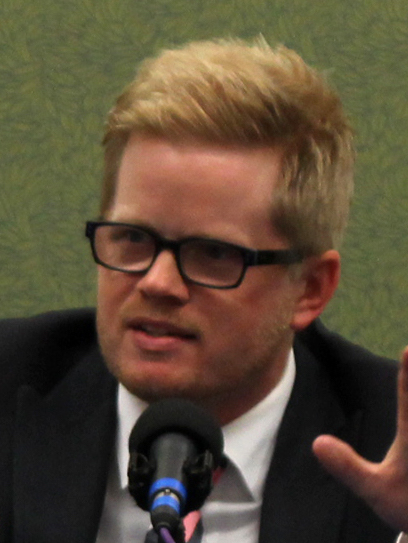

	Majority party	Minority party
Leader	Caleb Rowden (term-limited)	Doug Beck
Party	Republican	Democratic
Leader since	January 4, 2023	June 30, 2024
Leader's seat	19th - Columbia	1st - St. Louis
Last election	24	10
Seats after	24	10
Seat change	Steady	Steady
Popular vote	776,116	598,588
Percentage	56.46%	43.54%
- Republican gain Democratic gain Republican hold Democratic hold No election Republican: 50–60% 60–70% 70–80% 80–90% >90% Democratic: 50–60% 70–80% 80–90% >90%
President pro tempore before election
Caleb Rowden
Republican
Elected President pro tempore
Cindy O'Laughlin
Republican

The 2024 Missouri Senate election took place on Tuesday, November 5, 2024, with the primary election held on Tuesday, August 6, 2024. Missouri voters elected state senators in the 17 odd-numbered districts of the Senate to serve four-year terms. The last time that these seats were up for election was the 2020 Missouri Senate election, and the next time will be the 2028 Missouri State Senate election.

The election coincided with United States national elections and Missouri state elections, including U.S. President, U.S. Senate, U.S. House, Governor, and Missouri House.

Following the previous election in 2022, Republicans held a 24-to-10-seat supermajority over Democrats. Going into the 2024 elections, there are four vacancies after Senator Greg Razer (D) of District 7 resigned on April 25, 2024, Senators Karla Eslinger (R) of District 33 and John Rizzo (D) of District 11 resigned in June 2024, and Lauren Arthur (D) of District 17 resigned in July 2024. Therefore, there are 23 Republicans and seven Democrats at the time of the 2024 election (plus the three vacancies). Democrats would have to net 11 seats to flip control of the chamber.

These will be the first elections in the odd-numbered Missouri Senate districts following the 2020 United States redistricting cycle, which resulted in redrawn legislative district boundaries.

== Predictions ==
Source	Ranking	As of
CNalysis	Solid R	April 7, 2024

== Overview ==
=== Close races ===
Districts where the margin of victory was under 10%:

1. District 11, 4.7% (gain)
2. District 15, 4.83%
3. District 17, 6%

== Retiring incumbents ==
Members of the Missouri General Assembly are prohibited from serving more than eight years in the state senate, due to statutory term limits.

=== Democrats ===
District 7: Greg Razer resigned due to appointment to State Tax Commission.
District 11: John Rizzo resigned to take a position as executive director of the Jackson County Sports Authority.
District 17: Lauren Arthur resigned after being appointed to the Missouri Labor and Industrial Relations Commission.

=== Republicans ===
District 3: Elaine Gannon retired.
District 15: Andrew Koenig was term-limited (ran for State Treasurer).
District 19: Caleb Rowden was term-limited.
District 21: Denny Hoskins was term-limited (ran for Secretary of State).
District 23: Bill Eigel was term-limited (ran for Governor).
District 27: Holly Thompson Rehder retired to run for Lieutenant Governor.
District 33: Karla Eslinger resigned due to appointment as Commissioner of the Missouri Department of Elementary and Secondary Education (DESE).

== Summary of results by Senate district ==
Italics denote an open seat held by the incumbent party; bold text denotes a gain for a party.

Senate District	Incumbent	Party	Elected Senator	Party
1	Doug Beck	Dem	Doug Beck	Dem
3	Elaine Gannon	Rep	Mike Henderson	Rep
5	Steve Roberts	Dem	Steve Roberts	Dem
7	Vacant (Note: Senator Greg Razer (D) of District 7 resigned on April 25, 2024.)		Patty Lewis	Dem
9	Barbara Anne Washington	Dem	Barbara Anne Washington	Dem
11	Vacant (Note: Senator John Rizzo (D) of District 11 resigned on June 30, 2024.)		**Joe Nicola**	Rep
13	Angela Mosley	Dem	Angela Mosley	Dem
15	Andrew Koenig	Rep	David Gregory	Rep
17	Vacant (Note: Senator Lauren Arthur (D) of District 17 resigned on July 21, 2024.)		Maggie Nurrenbern	Dem
19	Caleb Rowden	Rep	**Stephen Webber**	Dem
21	Denny Hoskins	Rep	Kurtis Gregory	Rep
23	Bill Eigel	Rep	Adam Schnelting	Rep
25	Jason Bean	Rep	Jason Bean	Rep
27	Holly Rehder	Rep	Jamie Burger	Rep
29	Mike Moon	Rep	Mike Moon	Rep
31	Rick Brattin	Rep	Rick Brattin	Rep
33	Vacant (Note: Senator Karla Eslinger (R) of District 33 resigned in June 2024.)		Brad Hudson	Rep

== Detailed Results by Senate District ==
Sources for election results:

== District 1 ==
The 1st district encompasses southeastern St. Louis County and includes Oakville, Mehlville, Webster Groves, Affton, Concord, Lemay, and Crestwood.

1st District Democratic primary details

=== Candidates ===
- Doug Beck, incumbent state senator (2021–present)

Democratic primary results, District 1
Party	Candidate	Votes	%
Democratic	Doug Beck (Incumbent)	16,249	100.00
Total votes		16,249	100.00

1st District Republican primary details

=== Candidates ===
- Robert J. Crump

=== Endorsements ===
Robert J. Crump

Organizations

- Missouri Right to Life PAC

Republican primary results, District 1
Party	Candidate	Votes	%
Republican	Robert J. Crump	13,550	100.00
Total votes		13,550	100.00

=== General Election ===
2024 Missouri Senate election, 1st District
Party	Candidate	Votes	%
Democratic	Doug Beck (Incumbent)	53,264	56.15
Republican	Robert J. Crump	41,598	43.85
Total votes		93,861	100.00
Democratic hold			

== District 3 ==
The 3rd district is located in east-central Missouri, consisting of the southern half of Jefferson County and all of Crawford, St. Francois, St. Genevieve and Washington counties.

3rd District Democratic primary details

=== Candidates ===
- Doug Halbert

Democratic primary results, District 3
Party	Candidate	Votes	%
Democratic	Doug Halbert	4,809	100.00%
Total votes		4,809	100.00%

3rd District Republican primary details

=== Candidates ===
- Cyndi Buchheit-Courtway, state representative (2021–present)
- Mike Henderson, state representative (2017–present)

=== Endorsements ===
Cyndi Buchheit-Courtway

Organizations

- Missouri Right to Life PAC (co-endorsed Henderson)
Mike Henderson

Organizations

- Missouri Right to Life PAC (co-endorsed Buchheit-Courtway)

Polling

Poll source	Date(s) administered	Sample size (Note: Key: A – all adults RV – registered voters LV – likely voters V – unclear)	Margin of error	Cyndi Buchheit-Courtway	Mike Henderson	Undecided
Remington Research Group (R) (Note: Poll sponsored by The Missouri Scout)	April 1–4, 2024	301 (LV)	± 5.6%	19%	31%	50%

=== Results ===
Republican primary results, District 3
Party	Candidate	Votes	%
Republican	Mike Henderson	14,980	59.94
Republican	Cyndi Buchheit-Courtway	10,011	40.06
Total votes		24,991	100.00

2024 Missouri Senate election, 3rd District
Party	Candidate	Votes	%
Republican	Mike Henderson	60,548	75.86
Democratic	Doug Halbert	19,273	24.14
Total votes		79,821	100.00
Republican hold			

== District 5 ==
The 5th district is made up entirely of the city of St. Louis, except for a one-third portion in the southwest.

5th District Democratic primary details

=== Candidates ===
- Steve Roberts, incumbent state senator (2021–present)

Democratic primary results, District 5
Party	Candidate	Votes	%
Democratic	Steve Roberts	20,095	100.00%
Total votes		20,095	100.00%

5th District Republican primary details

=== Candidates ===
- Robert Vroman

Republican primary results, District 5
Party	Candidate	Votes	%
Republican	Robert Vroman	931	100.00%
Total votes		931	100.00%

2024 Missouri Senate election, 5th District
Party	Candidate	Votes	%
Democratic	Steve Roberts (Incumbent)	47,670	88.57
Republican	Robert Vroman	6,151	11.43
Total votes		53,821	100.00
Democratic hold			

== District 7 ==
The 7th district is based mostly in Kansas City, including most of the city's downtown area and almost all of the city west of Troost Avenue, and includes the entire city of Grandview.

7th District Democratic primary details

=== Candidates ===
- Pat Contreras
- Patty Lewis, incumbent state representative from District 25 (2021–present)

==== Withdrawn ====
- Greg Razer, incumbent state senator (2021–present)

Polling

Poll source	Date(s) administered	Sample size	Margin of error	Pat Contreras	Patty Lewis	Undecided
Remington Research Group (R)	May 29–31, 2024	377 (LV)	± 5.0%	13%	21%	66%

Democratic primary results, District 7
Party	Candidate	Votes	%
Democratic	Patty Lewis	14,970	67.04%
Democratic	Pat Contreras	7,361	32.96%
Total votes		22,331	100.00%

7th District Republican primary details

==== Candidates ====
- Joey LaSalle

Republican primary results, District 7
Party	Candidate	Votes	%
Republican	Joey LaSalle	4,326	100.00%
Total votes		4,326	100.00%

2024 Missouri Senate election, 7th District
Party	Candidate	Votes	%
Democratic	Patty Lewis	58,148	74.47
Republican	Joey LaSalle	19,939	25.53
Total votes		78,088	100.00
Democratic hold			

== District 9 ==
The 9th district includes most of the part of Kansas City east of Troost Avenue and the entirety of the city of Raytown.

9th District Democratic primary details

=== Candidates ===
- Brandon Ellington, former Kansas City councilman (2019–2023) and former state representative (2013–2019)
- Barbara Anne Washington, incumbent state senator (2021–present)

=== Results ===
Democratic primary results, District 9
Party	Candidate	Votes	%
Democratic	Barbara Anne Washington	13,382	78.96%
Democratic	Brandon Ellington	3,565	21.04%
Total votes		16,947	100.00%

9th District Republican primary details

=== Candidates ===
- Derron Black

=== Endorsements ===
Derron Black

Organizations

- Missouri Right to Life PAC

=== Results ===
Republican primary results, District 9
Party	Candidate	Votes	%
Republican	Derron Black	2,897	100.00%
Total votes		2,897	100.00%

2024 Missouri Senate election, 9th District
Party	Candidate	Votes	%
Democratic	Barbara Washington (Incumbent)	50,220	79.31
Republican	Derron Black	13,103	20.69
Total votes		63,323	100.00
Democratic hold			

== District 11 ==
The 11th district is located in northern Jackson County and includes a portion of Kansas City along with the cities of Independence, Grain Valley, Oak Grove, Sugar Creek and Buckner.

11th District Democratic primary details

=== Candidates ===
- Robert Sauls, state representative (2019–present)

=== Results ===
Democratic primary results, District 11
Party	Candidate	Votes	%
Democratic	Robert Sauls	9,777	100.00%
Total votes		9,777	100.00%

11th District Republican primary details

=== Candidates ===
- David Martin
- Aaron McMullen, state representative (2023–present)
- Joe Nicola

=== Endorsements ===
David Martin

Organizations

- Missouri Right to Life PAC (co-endorsed McMullen and Nicola)
Aaron McMullen

Organizations

- Missouri Right to Life PAC (co-endorsed Martin and Nicola)
Joe Nicola

Organizations

- Missouri Right to Life PAC (co-endorsed Martin and McMullen)

=== Results ===
Republican primary results, District 11
Party	Candidate	Votes	%
Republican	Joe Nicola	6,211	48.54%
Republican	Aaron McMullen	5,043	39.42%
Republican	David Martin	1,540	12.04%
Total votes		12,794	100.00%

Polling

Poll source	Date(s) administered	Sample size	Margin of error	Robert Sauls (D)	Joe Nicola (R)	Undecided
Remington Research Group (R)	October 15–18, 2024	329 (LV)	± 5.2%	45%	46%	9%
Remington Research Group (R)	September 10–13, 2024	376 (LV)	± 4.9%	40%	46%	14%

2024 Missouri Senate election, 11th District
Party	Candidate	Votes	%
Republican	Joe Nicola	37,008	52.35
Democratic	Robert Sauls	33,680	47.65
Total votes		70,688	100.00
Republican gain from Democratic			

== District 13 ==
The 13th district is based in northeastern St. Louis County and includes Florissant, Old Jamestown, Spanish Lake, Jennings, Bellefontaine Neighbors and an eastern portion of Hazelwood.

13th District Democratic primary details

=== Candidates ===
- Angela Mosley, incumbent state senator (2021–present)
- Chantelle Nickson-Clark, state representative (2023–present)

Polling

Poll source	Date(s) administered	Sample size	Margin of error	Angela Mosley	Chantelle Nickson-Clark	Undecided
Remington Research Group (R)	July 25–28, 2024	347 (LV)	± 5.4%	26%	21%	53%
Remington Research Group (R)	April 30 – May 2, 2024	300 (LV)	± 5.6%	34%	13%	53%

=== Results ===
Democratic primary results, District 13
Party	Candidate	Votes	%
Democratic	Angela Mosley	16,134	56.68%
Democratic	Chantelle Nickson-Clark	12,332	43.32%
Total votes		28,466	100.00%

2024 Missouri Senate election, 13th District
Party	Candidate	Votes	%
Democratic	Angela Mosley (Incumbent)	Unopposed	
Total votes		63,076	100.0

== District 15 ==
The 15th district encompasses most of the westernmost portion of St. Louis County and includes Chesterfield, Wildwood, Ballwin, Manchester and Town and County.

15th District Democratic primary details

=== Candidates ===
- Joe Pereles

=== Results ===
Democratic primary results, District 15
Party	Candidate	Votes	%
Democratic	Joe Pereles	13,501	100.00%
Total votes		13,501	100.00%

15th District Republican primary details

=== Candidates ===
- Jim Bowlin
- David Gregory, former state representative (2017–2023)
- Mark A. Harder

=== Endorsements ===
Jim Bowlin

Organizations

- Missouri Right to Life PAC (co-endorsed Gregory and Harder)
David Gregory

Organizations

- Missouri Right to Life PAC (co-endorsed Bowlin and Harder)
Mark A. Harder

Organizations

- Missouri Right to Life PAC (co-endorsed Bowlin and Gregory)

Polling

Poll source	Date(s) administered	Sample size	Margin of error	Jim Bowlin	David Gregory	Mark Harder	Undecided
Remington Research Group (R)	July 26–29, 2024	322 (LV)	± 5.4%	16%	31%	17%	36%
Remington Research Group (R)	April 8–12, 2024	304 (LV)	± 5.6%	9%	14%	14%	63%
Remington Research Group (R)	November 16–20, 2023	382 (LV)	± 5.0%	5%	15%	9%	70%

=== Results ===
Republican primary results, District 15
Party	Candidate	Votes	%
Republican	David Gregory	9,099	40.74%
Republican	Mark A. Harder	7,628	34.15%
Republican	Jim Bowlin	5,607	25.11%
Total votes		22,334	100.00%

Polling

Poll source	Date(s) administered	Sample size	Margin of error	David Gregory (R)	Joe Pereles (D)	Jeff Coleman (L)	Undecided
Remington Research Group (R)	October 21–24, 2024	406 (LV)	± 4.9%	45%	47%	–	8%
Remington Research Group (R)	September 17–19, 2024	418 (LV)	± 4.9%	46%	42%	1%	11%

2024 Missouri Senate election, 15th District
Party	Candidate	Votes	%
Republican	David Gregory	56,093	51.62
Democratic	Joe Pereles	50,841	46.79
Libertarian	Jeff Coleman	1,733	1.59
Total votes		108,667	100.00
Republican hold			

== District 17 ==
The 17th district is located in southwestern Clay County and includes a portion of Kansas City along with Gladstone, Pleasant Valley and Claycomo.

17th District Democratic primary details

=== Candidates ===
- Maggie Nurrenbern, state representative (2021–present)

=== Results ===
Democratic primary results, District 17
Party	Candidate	Votes	%
Democratic	Maggie Nurrenbern	10,906	100.00%
Total votes		10,906	100.00%

17th District Republican primary details

=== Candidates ===
- Jerry Nolte, current Clay County Commissioner (2015–present) and former state representative (2005–2013)

=== Results ===
Republican primary results, District 17
Party	Candidate	Votes	%
Republican	Jerry Nolte	10,237	100.00%
Total votes		10,237	100.00%

Polling

Poll source	Date(s) administered	Sample size	Margin of error	Maggie Nurrenbern (D)	Jerry Nolte (R)	Undecided
Remington Research Group (R)	September 24–26, 2024	356 (LV)	± 5.1%	45%	44%	11%

2024 Missouri Senate election, 17th District
Party	Candidate	Votes	%
Democratic	Maggie Nurrenbern (Incumbent)	44,709	53.00
Republican	Jerry Nolte	39,650	47.00
Total votes		84,359	100.00
Democratic hold			

== District 19 ==
The 19th district encompasses all of Boone County, which includes Columbia.

19th District Democratic primary details

=== Declared ===
- Stephen Webber, former state representative (2009–2017)

=== Results ===
Democratic primary results, District 19
Party	Candidate	Votes	%
Democratic	Stephen Webber	13,014	100.00%
Total votes		13,014	100.00%

19th District Republican primary details

=== Candidates ===
- James Coyne

=== Withdrawn ===
- Chuck Basye, former state representative (2015–2023)

=== Results ===
Republican primary results, District 19
Party	Candidate	Votes	%
Republican	James Coyne	11,088	100.00%
Total votes		11,088	100.00%

2024 Missouri Senate election, 19th District
Party	Candidate	Votes	%
Democratic	Stephen Webber	48,998	56.97
Republican	James Coyne	37,010	43.03
Total votes		86,008	100.00
Democratic gain from Republican			

== District 21 ==
The 21st district, based in the west-central part of the state, consists of most of Clay County and all of Lafayette, Saline, Ray, Cooper and Howard counties.

21st District Democratic primary details

=== Candidates ===
- Jim Bates

=== Results ===
Democratic primary results, District 21
Party	Candidate	Votes	%
Democratic	Jim Bates	7,934	100.00%
Total votes		7,934	100.00%

21st District Republican primary details

=== Candidates ===
- Kurtis Gregory, state representative (2021–present)
- Doug Richey, state representative (2019–present)

=== Endorsements ===
Kurtis Gregory

Organizations

- Missouri Farm Bureau
Doug Richey

Organizations

- Americans for Prosperity
- Missouri Right to Life PAC

Polling

Poll source	Date(s) administered	Sample size	Margin of error	Kurtis Gregory	Doug Richey	Undecided
Remington Research Group (R)	July 27–30, 2024	317 (LV)	± 5.4%	35%	25%	40%
Remington Research Group (R)	June 5–7, 2024	384 (LV)	± 4.96%	18%	18%	64%

=== Results ===
Republican primary results, District 21
Party	Candidate	Votes	%
Republican	Kurtis Gregory	14,947	56.62%
Republican	Doug Richey	11,451	43.38%
Total votes		26,398	100.00%

2024 Missouri Senate election, 21st District
Party	Candidate	Votes	%
Republican	Kurtis Gregory	64,446	69.32
Democratic	Jim Bates	28,521	30.68
Total votes		92,967	100.00
Republican hold			

== District 23 ==
The 23rd district is made up of the northeastern half of St. Charles County, including the cities of St. Charles and St. Peters.

23rd District Democratic primary details

=== Candidates ===
- Matt Williams

=== Results ===
Democratic primary results, District 23
Party	Candidate	Votes	%
Democratic	Matt Williams	9,913	100.00%
Total votes		9,913	100.00%

23rd District Republican primary details

=== Candidates ===
- Rich Chrismer, former state representative (1993–2001)
- Phil Christofanelli, state representative (2017–present)
- Dan O'Connell
- Adam Schnelting, state representative (2019–present)

=== Endorsements ===
Adam Schnelting

Organizations

- Missouri Right to Life PAC

Polling

Poll source	Date(s) administered	Sample size	Margin of error	Rich Chrismer	Phil Christofanelli	Dan O'Connell	Adam Schnelting	Undecided
Remington Research Group (R)	July 27–30, 2024	307 (LV)	± 5.7%	10%	25%	3%	30%	32%
Remington Research Group (R)	April 15–18, 2024	300 (LV)	± 5.6%	14%	9%	5%	14%	58%

=== Results ===
Republican primary results, District 23
Party	Candidate	Votes	%
Republican	Adam Schnelting	9,563	50.32%
Republican	Phil Christofanelli	5,267	27.72%
Republican	Rich Chrismer	2,928	15.41%
Republican	Dan O'Connell	1,245	6.55%
Total votes		19,003	100.00%

2024 Missouri Senate election, 23rd District
Party	Candidate	Votes	%
Republican	Adam Schnelting	51,308	55.09
Democratic	Matt Williams	41,822	44.91
Total votes		93,130	100.00
Republican hold			

== District 25 ==
The 25th district is located in southeast Missouri and includes the counties of Butler, Stoddard, Dunklin, New Madrid, Pemiscot, Wayne, Mississippi, Ripley, Oregon and Carter.

25th District Democratic primary details

=== Candidates ===
- Chuck Banks

=== Results ===
Democratic primary results, District 25
Party	Candidate	Votes	%
Democratic	Chuck Banks	2,015	100.00%
Total votes		2,015	100.00%

25th District Republican primary details

=== Candidates ===
- Jason Bean, incumbent state senator (2021–present)

=== Endorsements ===
Jason Bean

Organizations

- Missouri Farm Bureau

=== Results ===
Republican primary results, District 25
Party	Candidate	Votes	%
Republican	Jason Bean	25,958	100.00%
Total votes		25,958	100.00%

2024 Missouri Senate election, 25th District
Party	Candidate	Votes	%
Republican	Jason Bean (Incumbent)	62,593	83.67
Democratic	Chuck Banks	12,215	16.33
Total votes		74,808	100.00
Republican hold			

== District 27 ==
The 27th district is based in southeast Missouri and includes the counties of Cape Girardeau, Scott, Perry, Madison, Bollinger, Iron and Reynolds.

27th District Republican primary details

=== Candidates ===
- Jamie Burger, state representative (2021–present)
- Chris Dinkins, state representative (2019–present)
- Jacob Turner

=== Endorsements ===
Chris Dinkins

Organizations

- Missouri Right to Life PAC

Polling

Poll source	Date(s) administered	Sample size	Margin of error	Jamie Burger	Chris Dinkins	Jacob Turner	Undecided
Remington Research Group (R)	July 28 – August 1, 2024	296 (LV)	± 5.7%	31%	21%	20%	28%
Remington Research Group (R)	June 24–27, 2024	311 (LV)	± 5.1%	24%	27%	8%	41%

=== Results ===
Republican primary results, District 27
Party	Candidate	Votes	%
Republican	Jamie Burger	13,132	40.89%
Republican	Jacob Turner	11,932	37.16%
Republican	Chris Dinkins	7,049	21.95%
Total votes		32,113	100.00%

2024 Missouri Senate election, 27th District
Party	Candidate	Votes	%
Republican	Jamie Burger	Unopposed	
Total votes		72,629	100.0

== District 29 ==
The 29th district is located in the southwestern corner of the state and consists of the counties of Christian, Lawrence, Barry and McDonald.

29th District Democratic primary details

=== Candidates ===
- Ron Monnig

=== Results ===
Democratic primary results, District 29
Party	Candidate	Votes	%
Democratic	Ron Monnig	3,681	100.00%
Total votes		3,681	100.00%

29th District Republican primary details

=== Candidates ===
- Susan Haralson
- Mike Moon, incumbent state senator (2021–present)

=== Endorsements ===
Mike Moon

Organizations

- Freedom Principle MO - Missouri First PAC
- Missouri Right to Life PAC

Polling

Poll source	Date(s) administered	Sample size	Margin of error	Susan Haralson	Mike Moon	Undecided
Remington Research Group (R)	April 22–25, 2024	300 (LV)	± 5.6%	13%	37%	50%

=== Results ===
Republican primary results, District 29
Party	Candidate	Votes	%
Republican	Mike Moon	22,402	77.21%
Republican	Susan Haralson	6,614	22.79%
Total votes		29,016	100.00%

2024 Missouri Senate election, 29th District
Party	Candidate	Votes	%
Republican	Mike Moon (Incumbent)	73,685	80.08
Democratic	Ron Monnig	18,326	19.92
Total votes		92,011	100.00
Republican hold			

== District 31 ==
The 31st district is located in the west-central part of the state and is made up of the counties of Cass, Johnson and Bates.

31st District Democratic primary details

=== Candidates ===
- Raymond L. James

=== Results ===
Democratic primary results, District 31
Party	Candidate	Votes	%
Democratic	Raymond L. James	6,044	100.00%
Total votes		6,044	100.00%

31st District Republican primary details

=== Candidates ===
- Rick Brattin, incumbent state senator (2021–present)
- Mike Haffner, state representative (2019–present)
- Dan Houx, state representative (2017–present)

=== Endorsements ===
Rick Brattin

Organizations

- Freedom Principle MO - Missouri First PAC
- Missouri Right to Life PAC
Mike Haffner

Organizations

- Missouri Farm Bureau

Polling

Poll source	Date(s) administered	Sample size	Margin of error	Rick Brattin	Mike Haffner	Dan Houx	Undecided
Remington Research Group (R)	October 18–20, 2023	304 (LV)	± 5.6%	57%	16%	12%	15%

=== Results ===
Republican primary results, District 31
Party	Candidate	Votes	%
Republican	Rick Brattin	11,034	46.97%
Republican	Mike Haffner	6,445	27.43%
Republican	Dan Houx	6,013	25.60%
Total votes		23,492	100.00%

2024 Missouri Senate election, 31st District
Party	Candidate	Votes	%
Republican	Rick Brattin (Incumbent)	60,541	68.51
Democratic	Raymond L. James	27,825	31.49
Total votes		88,366	100.00
Republican hold			

== District 33 ==
The 33rd district is located in the southern part of the state and encompasses the counties of Taney, Howell, Stone, Texas, Douglas, Ozark and Shannon.

33rd District Republican primary details

=== Candidates ===
- Brad Hudson, state representative (2019–present)
- Travis Smith, state representative (2021–present)

=== Endorsements ===
Brad Hudson

U.S. representatives

- Eric Burlison, U.S. Representative from MO-07 (2023–present)

Organizations

- Missouri Right to Life PAC

Polling

Poll source	Date(s) administered	Sample size	Margin of error	Brad Hudson	Travis Smith	Undecided
Remington Research Group (R)	July 15–18, 2024	289 (LV)	± 5.7%	29%	29%	42%

=== Results ===
Republican primary results, District 33
Party	Candidate	Votes	%
Republican	Brad Hudson	18,520	52.62%
Republican	Travis Smith	16,674	47.38%
Total votes		35,194	100.00%

2024 Missouri Senate election, 33rd District
Party	Candidate	Votes	%
Republican	Brad Hudson	Unopposed	
Total votes		79,814	100.0

== See also ==
- 2024 United States elections
- 2024 United States presidential election in Missouri
- 2024 United States Senate election in Missouri
- 2024 United States House of Representatives elections in Missouri
- 2024 Missouri elections
- 2024 Missouri gubernatorial election
- 2024 Missouri lieutenant gubernatorial election
- 2024 Missouri Secretary of State election
- 2024 Missouri Attorney General election
- 2024 Missouri State Treasurer election
- 2024 Missouri House of Representatives election
- Missouri General Assembly
- Missouri Senate
- List of Missouri General Assemblies

== Notes ==
Partisan clients
