= 2026 Missouri Amendment 6 =

Constitutional Amendment 6
- November 3, 2026

Results
Choice	Votes	%
Yes	1,253,922	59.91%
No	838,974	40.09%

Missouri Amendment 6 was a constitutional amendment that appeared on the ballot in the U.S. state of Missouri on November 3, 2026. The initiative amended the Constitution of Missouri to raise the threshold for the Missouri General Assembly to amend or repeal a previously-passed ballot initiative to require at least 80% of the Missouri House and Senate to refer the proposed change back to voters, who would then approve or reject the change in a future election. Additionally, it would:

- enshrine the initiative and referendum process as a fundamental right
- allow courts to amend ballot summaries for initiatives
- prohibit the legislature from raising signature thresholds, shortening signature gathering periods, narrowing subjects allowed to be on the ballot, creating additional requirements for signature gatherers, or enacting other measures to restrict usage of the ballot initiative.

The amendment was passed by 59% of voters.

== Endorsements ==
Yes

U.S. senators

- Jack Danforth, (1976-1995) (Republican)

Statewide officials

- Jason Kander, Missouri Secretary of State (2013-2017) (Democratic)

State representatives

- Robert T. Johnson, state representative (1973-1977, 2003-2007) (Republican)
- Crystal Quade, state representative from the 132nd district (2017-2025) (Democratic)

Labor unions

- Missouri AFL-CIO
- Missouri National Education Association

Organizations

- Empower Missouri Missouri
- Metropolitan Congregations United
- Missouri Action Alliance
- Missouri NAACP State Conference
- Missouri National Organization for Women
- Missouri NORML
- Show Me Integrity
- Sierra Club Missouri Chapter
- Veterans for All Voters

Political parties

- Missouri Democratic Party
No

State legislators

- Joe Nicola, state senator from the 11th district (2025–present) (Republican)

Organizations

- Missouri Chamber of Commerce and Industry

Political parties

- Missouri Republican Party

== Polling ==
Poll source	Date(s) administered	Sample size (Note: Key: A – all adults RV – registered voters LV – likely voters V – unclear)	Margin of error	Yes	No	Undecided
Saint Louis University/YouGov	August 13–24, 2026	900 (LV)	± 4.09%	48%	21%	32%
