= List of Missouri General Assemblies =

List of Missouri state legislatures

The following is a list of legislative terms of the Missouri General Assembly, the law-making branch of government of the U.S. state of Missouri. Missouri became part of the United States on August 10, 1821.

== Legislatures ==
Number	Start date	End date	Last election
Missouri Constitution of 1820
1st Missouri General Assembly	1820		
2nd Missouri General Assembly	1822		
3rd Missouri General Assembly	1824		
4th Missouri General Assembly	1826		
5th Missouri General Assembly	1828		
6th Missouri General Assembly	1830		
7th Missouri General Assembly	1832		
8th Missouri General Assembly	1834		
9th Missouri General Assembly	1836		
10th Missouri General Assembly	1838		
11th Missouri General Assembly	1840		
12th Missouri General Assembly	1842		
13th Missouri General Assembly	1844		
14th Missouri General Assembly	1846		
15th Missouri General Assembly	1848		
16th Missouri General Assembly	1850		
17th Missouri General Assembly	1852		
18th Missouri General Assembly	1854		
19th Missouri General Assembly	1856		
20th Missouri General Assembly	1858		
21st Missouri General Assembly	1860		
22nd Missouri General Assembly	1862		
23rd Missouri General Assembly	1864		
Missouri Constitution of 1865
24th Missouri General Assembly	1867		
25th Missouri General Assembly	1869		
26th Missouri General Assembly	1871		
27th Missouri General Assembly	1873		
28th Missouri General Assembly	1875		
Missouri Constitution of 1875
29th Missouri General Assembly	1877		
30th Missouri General Assembly	1879		
31st Missouri General Assembly	1881		
32nd Missouri General Assembly	1883		
33rd Missouri General Assembly	1885		
34th Missouri General Assembly	1887		
35th Missouri General Assembly	1889		
36th Missouri General Assembly	1891		
37th Missouri General Assembly	1893		
38th Missouri General Assembly	1895		
39th Missouri General Assembly	1897		
40th Missouri General Assembly	1899		
41st Missouri General Assembly	1901		
42nd Missouri General Assembly	1903		
43rd Missouri General Assembly	1905		
44th Missouri General Assembly	1907		
45th Missouri General Assembly	1909		
46th Missouri General Assembly	1911		
47th Missouri General Assembly	1913		
48th Missouri General Assembly	1915		
49th Missouri General Assembly	1917		
50th Missouri General Assembly	1919		
51st Missouri General Assembly	1921		
52nd Missouri General Assembly	1923		
53rd Missouri General Assembly	1925		
54th Missouri General Assembly	1927		
55th Missouri General Assembly	1929		
56th Missouri General Assembly	1931		
57th Missouri General Assembly	1933		
58th Missouri General Assembly	1935		
59th Missouri General Assembly	1937		
60th Missouri General Assembly	1939		
61st Missouri General Assembly	1941		
62nd Missouri General Assembly	1942		
63rd Missouri General Assembly	1944		
Missouri Constitution of 1945
64th Missouri General Assembly	1947		
65th Missouri General Assembly	1949		
66th Missouri General Assembly	1951		
67th Missouri General Assembly	1953		
68th Missouri General Assembly	1955		
69th Missouri General Assembly	1957		
70th Missouri General Assembly	1959		
71st Missouri General Assembly	1961		
72nd Missouri General Assembly	1963		
73rd Missouri General Assembly	1965		
74th Missouri General Assembly	1967		
75th Missouri General Assembly	1969		
76th Missouri General Assembly	1971		
77th Missouri General Assembly	1973		
78th Missouri General Assembly	1975		
79th Missouri General Assembly	1977		
80th Missouri General Assembly	1979		
81st Missouri General Assembly	1981		
82nd Missouri General Assembly	1983		
83rd Missouri General Assembly	1985		
84th Missouri General Assembly	1987		
85th Missouri General Assembly	1989		
86th Missouri General Assembly	1991		
87th Missouri General Assembly	1993		
88th Missouri General Assembly	1995		
89th Missouri General Assembly	1997		
90th Missouri General Assembly	1999		
91st Missouri General Assembly	2001		
92nd Missouri General Assembly	2003		
93rd Missouri General Assembly	2005		
94th Missouri General Assembly	2007		
95th Missouri General Assembly	2009		
96th Missouri General Assembly	2011		November 2010: House, Senate
97th Missouri General Assembly	2013		
98th Missouri General Assembly	2015		
99th Missouri General Assembly	2017		
100th Missouri General Assembly	2019		November 2018: Senate
101st Missouri General Assembly	2021		November 2020: House, Senate
102nd	2023		November 2022: House, Senate
103rd	2025		November 5, 2024: House, Senate

== See also ==
- List of speakers of the Missouri House of Representatives
- List of governors of Missouri
- Politics of Missouri
- Elections in Missouri
- Missouri State Capitol
- Historical outline of Missouri
- Lists of United States state legislative sessions
