= Mike Haffner =

Mike Haffner may refer to:

- Mike Haffner (American football)
- Mike Haffner (politician)
