= Ron Copeland =

Ron Copeland may refer to:

- Ron Copeland (athlete) (1946–1975), American NFL player
- Ron Copeland (politician), American politician and retired law enforcement officer
