= Brandon Phelps =

Brandon Phelps may refer to:

- Brandon Phelps (Illinois politician)
- Brandon Phelps (Missouri politician)
