= Hewkin =

Hewkin is a surname. Notable people with the surname include:

- Alice Hewkin, Chinese British actress
- John Hewkin, American politician

== See also ==
- Hewing
- Hekinan
