= Jason Chipman =

American politician

Member of the Missouri House of Representatives from the 120th district
- In office January 7, 2015 – January 4, 2023
- Preceded by: Shawn Sisco
- Succeeded by: Ron Copeland (redistricting)

Personal details
- Born: St. Charles, Missouri, U.S.
- Party: Republican

Jason Chipman is an American politician who served in the Missouri House of Representatives, representing the 120th district from 2015 to 2023.

Chipman currently serves as the Executive Director of the Libertas Institute (Utah).
