= Betsy Fogle =

American politician

Member of the Missouri House of Representatives from the 135th district
- Incumbent
- Assumed office January 4, 2021
- Preceded by: Steve Helms
- Succeeded by: John Chiles (elect)

Personal details
- Born: Springfield, Missouri, U.S.
- Party: Democratic
- Education: Missouri State University (BA); University of Arkansas (MA)

Betsy Fogle is an American politician serving as a member of the Missouri House of Representatives from the 135th district. Flipping her house seat in November 2020, and being sworn into office in January 2021.

== Early life and education ==
Fogle was born in Springfield and attended Parkview High School. She earned a bachelor's degree from Missouri State University and a Master of Arts in sociology from the University of Arkansas.

== Career ==
Fogle worked at Jordan Valley Community Health Center until she was urged by House Minority Leader Crystal Quade to run for office. Fogle was narrowly elected in November 2020 over incumbent representative Steve Helms and Green Party candidate Vicke Kepling. Fogle's victory resulted in the only seat flipping between either party in the state during the 2020 election cycle.

== Electoral history ==
Missouri House of Representatives — District 135 — Greene County (2020)
Party	Candidate	Votes	%	±%
Democratic	Betsy Fogle	8,555	48.20%	+1.17
Republican	Steve Helms	8,476	47.75%	−4.91
Green	Vicke Kepling	696	3.92%	+3.92

Missouri House of Representatives — District 135 — Greene County (2022)
Party	Candidate	Votes	%	±%
Democratic	Betsy Fogle	6,040	56.20%	+8.0
Republican	AJ Exner	4,700	43.80	−3.95

Missouri House of Representatives — District 135 — Greene County (2024)
Party	Candidate	Votes	%	±%
Democratic	Betsy Fogle	8,529	55.00%	−1.20
Republican	Michael Hasty	6,974	45.00	+1.2
