= Paul Fitzwater =

American politician (born 1959)

Member of the Missouri House of Representatives from the 144th district
- In office 2011–2019
- Preceded by: J.C. Kuessner
- Succeeded by: Chris Dinkins

Personal details
- Born: March 5, 1959 (age 67) Potosi, Missouri
- Party: Republican
- Spouse: Sandy Fitzwater
- Children: Phoebe, Phillip, Katherine and Kelsey
- Education: Tarkio College
- Occupation: Teacher (Retired)
- Profession: Politician

Paul Fitzwater (born March 5, 1959) is a Republican former member of the Missouri House of Representatives, representing the 144th district which includes parts of Washington, Iron, Reynolds and Wayne Counties.

Preceded by J.C. Kuessner	152nd District Representative to Missouri House of Representatives; 2011–2019	Succeeded by Chris Dinkins
