= Jeff Pogue =

American politician

Member of the Missouri House of Representatives from the 143rd district
- In office 2013–2021
- Succeeded by: Ron Copeland

Personal details
- Born: April 23, 1981 (age 45) Rolla, Missouri, U.S.
- Party: Republican
- Spouse: Kimberly
- Children: 3

Jeff Pogue (born April 23, 1981) is an American politician who served as a member of the Missouri House of Representatives for the 143rd district from 2013 to 2021. He is a member of the Republican party.
