= Tori Schafer =

American politician

Member-elect of the Missouri House of Representatives from the 99th district
- Assuming office January 2027
- Succeeding: Ian Mackey

Personal details
- Party: Democratic

Tori Schafer is an American politician. A member of the Democratic Party, she is the member-elect for the 99th district of the Missouri House of Representatives.
