= J.C. Kuessner =

American politician

Member of the Missouri House of Representatives from the 152nd district
- In office 2002 - 2010
- Succeeded by: Paul Fitzwater

Personal details
- Born: November 13, 1942 (age 83) Poplar Bluff, Missouri
- Party: Democratic Party
- Spouse: Patricia
- Occupation: Business owner

John Carl 'J.C.' Kuessner, Jr. is a Democratic Party former member of the Missouri House of Representatives, representing District 152 since 2002. He served as Assistant Minority Floor Leader. He was raised in Winona, Missouri.
