= John Chiles (politician) =

American politician

Member-elect of the Missouri House of Representatives from the 135th district
- Assuming office January 6, 2027
- Succeeding: Betsy Fogle

Personal details
- Party: Democratic

John Chiles is an American politician of the Missouri Democratic Party who is the representative-elect for the 135th district in the Missouri House of Representatives. He was elected in the 2026 general election. He succeeded Betsy Fogle. The district covers east central and northeast Springfield, Missouri. Chiles is a college instructor and entrepreneur.
