= Chantelle Nickson-Clark =

American politician

Member of the Missouri House of Representatives from the 67th district
- In office January 4, 2023 – January 8, 2025
- Preceded by: Neil Smith
- Succeeded by: Tonya Rush

Personal details
- Born: St. Louis, Missouri
- Party: Democratic
- Website: www.chantellenicksonclark.com

Chantelle N. Nickson-Clark is an American politician who was a Democratic member of the Missouri House of Representatives from 2023 to 2025, representing the 67th district.

== Early life ==
Nickson-Clark was born in St. Louis. She graduated from Hazelwood East High School in 1995.

== Career ==
In the 2024 Missouri Senate election, she was a candidate in District 13. She lost in the primary to incumbent Angela Mosley.
