= Ian Mackey =

American politician

Member of the Missouri House of Representatives from the 99th district
- In office January 4, 2023 – August 31, 2026
- Preceded by: Trish Gunby
- Succeeded by: Tori Schafer (elect)

Member of the Missouri House of Representatives from the 87th district
- In office January 9, 2019 – January 3, 2023
- Preceded by: Stacey Newman
- Succeeded by: Paula Brown

Personal details
- Born: December 1986 (age 39) New Haven, Connecticut, U.S.
- Party: Democratic
- Spouse: Stephen Eisele
- Education: Westminster College (BA); Suffolk University Law School (JD)
- Website: https://house.mo.gov/MemberDetails.aspx?district=99&year=2023&code=R

Ian Dale Mackey (born December 1986) is a former Democratic member of the Missouri House of Representatives, representing the 99th House district, which is in St. Louis County. He previously represented the 87th House district.

== Life and career ==
Mackey graduated from Westminster College in Fulton, Missouri, and earned a JD from Suffolk University Law School in Boston.

=== Missouri House of Representatives ===
He was elected to represent the 87th district of the Missouri House of Representatives on November 6, 2018, beating Republican Steven Bailey with 67% of the vote. He ran unopposed for the seat again in the general election on November 3, 2020, winning 100% of the votes cast.

After statewide redistricting in 2022, Mackey ran to represent the newly-formed 99th House district, beating Republican LaVanna Wrobley with 65.4% of the vote.

Mackey is openly gay. In an April 2022 floor speech, Mackey passionately spoke out against a bill that would ban transgender students from participating in youth sports; in the speech, he also confronted and criticized Missouri state representative Chuck Basye for supporting the bill. A video of the speech went viral on TikTok.

In March 2025, Mackey was one of seven House Democrats to vote for state takeover of St. Louis Metropolitan Police Department.

Mackey resigned from the chamber in August 2026.

== Electoral history ==
Missouri House of Representatives Primary Election, August 7, 2018, District 87
Party	Candidate	Votes	%	±%
Democratic	Ian Mackey	4,021	50.89%	
Democratic	Sam Gladney	3,881	49.11%	
Total votes		7,902	100.00%	

Missouri House of Representatives Election, November 6, 2018, District 87
Party	Candidate	Votes	%	±%
Democratic	Ian Mackey	12,950	67.27%	
Republican	Steven Bailey	6,116	31.77%	
Green	Robert Warbin	185	0.96%	
Total votes		19,251	100.00%	

Missouri House of Representatives Election, November 3, 2020, District 87
Party	Candidate	Votes	%	±%
Democratic	Ian Mackey	16,778	100.00%	+32.73
Total votes		16,778	100.00%	

Missouri House of Representatives Primary Election, August 2, 2022, District 99
Party	Candidate	Votes	%	±%
Democratic	Ian Mackey	3,831	81.96%	
Democratic	Boris Abadzhyan	843	18.04%	
Total votes		4,674	100.00%	

Missouri House of Representatives Election, November 8, 2022, District 99
Party	Candidate	Votes	%	±%
Democratic	Ian Mackey	9,768	65.46%	−34.54
Republican	LaVanna Wrobley	5,154	34.54%	+34.54
Total votes		14,922	100.00%	
