= Brandon Phelps (Missouri politician) =

American politician

Member of the Missouri House of Representatives from the 54th district
- Incumbent
- Assumed office January 8, 2025
- Preceded by: Dan Houx

Personal details
- Party: Republican
- Website: https://www.voteforphelps.com/

Brandon Phelps is an American politician who was elected member of the Missouri House of Representatives for the 54th district in 2024.

Phelps is a graduate of Warrensburg High School. He is a local businessman in Johnson County.
