= 2020 Missouri Senate election =

Missouri Senate elections, 2020
- November 3, 2020

17 odd-numbered districts in the Missouri Senate 18 seats needed for a majority
	Majority party	Minority party
Leader	Dave Schatz	Gina Walsh
Party	Republican	Democratic
Leader since	January 9, 2019	July 7, 2016
Leader's seat	26th district	13th district
Seats before	24	10
Seats after	24	10
Seat change	Steady	Steady
Popular vote	731,386	598,526
Percentage	53.38%	43.68%
- Results: Democratic hold Republican hold No election
President pro tempore before election
Dave Schatz
Republican
Elected President pro tempore
Dave Schatz
Republican

The 2020 Missouri Senate elections were held on November 3, 2020, to elect the 17 Missouri State Senators to the Missouri Senate. Half of the Senate's thirty-four seats are up for election every two years, with each Senator serving four-year terms. The last time that these seats were up for election was the 2016 Missouri Senate election, and the next time that these seats will be up for election will be the 2024 Missouri State Senate election.

== Predictions ==
Source	Ranking	As of
The Cook Political Report	Likely R	October 21, 2020

== Results summary ==
=== Statewide ===
Party	Candi- dates	Votes		Seats		
Party	Candi- dates	No.	%	No.	+/–	%
Republican Party	14	731,386	53.38%	10	Steady	58.82%
Democratic Party	13	598,526	43.68%	7	Steady	41.18%
Libertarian Party	2	24,717	1.80%	0	Steady	0.00%
Green Party	1	15,383	1.12%	0	Steady	0.00%
Write-Ins	3	90	0.00%	0	Steady	0.00%
Total	29	1,370,102	100.00%	17	Steady	100.00%

=== District ===
Results of the 2020 Missouri State Senate elections by district:

District	Republican		Democratic		Others		Total		Result
District	Votes	%	Votes	%	Votes	%	Votes	%	Result
District 1	43,495	44.57%	54,095	55.43%	-	-	97,590	100.00%	Democratic hold
District 3	65,686	100.00%	-	-	-	-	65,686	100.00%	Republican hold
District 5	8,349	12.90%	56,379	87.10%	-	-	64,728	100.00%	Democratic hold
District 7	-	-	70,586	82.09%	15,401	17.91%	85,987	100.00%	Democratic hold
District 9	11,026	17.64%	51,463	82.36%	-	-	62,489	100.00%	Democratic hold
District 11	-	-	50,065	100.00%	-	-	50,065	100.00%	Democratic hold
District 13	-	-	64,191	87.56%	9,122	12.44%	73,313	100.00%	Democratic hold
District 15	61,172	53.99%	52,132	46.01%	-	-	113,304	100.00%	Republican hold
District 17	45,141	46.62%	51,690	53.38%	-	-	96,831	100.00%	Democratic hold
District 19	50,570	51.60%	47,367	48.33%	72	0.07%	98,009	100.00%	Republican hold
District 21	61,698	79.82%	-	-	15,595	20.17%	77,293	100.00%	Republican hold
District 23	57,988	57.25%	43,306	42.75%	-	-	101,294	100.00%	Republican hold
District 25	58,215	100.00%	-	-	-	-	58,215	100.00%	Republican hold
District 27	63,644	76.88%	19,135	23.12%	-	-	82,779	100.00%	Republican hold
District 29	75,582	100.00%	-	-	-	-	75,582	100.00%	Republican hold
District 31	63,929	71.42%	25,584	28.58%	-	-	89,513	100.00%	Republican hold
District 33	64,891	83.81%	12,533	16.19%	-	-	77,424	100.00%	Republican hold
Total	731,386	53.38%	598,526	43.68%	40,190	2.93%	1,370,102	100.00%	

=== Close races ===
Districts where the margin of victory was under 10%:

1. District 15, 7.98%
2. District 17, 6.74%
3. District 19, 3.27%

== District 1 ==
=== Democratic primary ===
==== Primary results ====
Democratic primary results
Party	Candidate	Votes	%
Democratic	Doug Beck	26,601	100.0%
Total votes		26,601	100.0%

=== Republican primary ===
==== Primary results ====
Republican primary results
Party	Candidate	Votes	%
Republican	David Lenihan	7,299	66.1%
Republican	Mitchell Kohlberg	3,744	33.9%
Total votes		11,043	100.0%

=== General election ===
==== Polling ====
Poll source	Date(s) administered	Sample size (Note: Key: A – all adults RV – registered voters LV – likely voters V – unclear)	Margin of error	Doug Beck (D)	David Lenihan (R)	Undecided
Remington Research Group (R) (Note: Poll sponsored by the Missouri Scout)	September 9–10, 2020	646 (LV)	± 3.8%	43%	36%	21%

==== Results ====
Missouri's 1st State Senate District, 2020
Party	Candidate	Votes	%	±%
Democratic	Doug Beck	54,095	55.43%	+2.34%
Republican	David Lenihan	43,495	44.57%	−2.34%
Margin of victory		10,600	10.86%	
Total votes		97,590	100.0%	
Democratic hold				

== District 3 ==
=== Republican primary ===
==== Polling ====
Poll source	Date(s) administered	Sample size	Margin of error	Joshua Barrett	Elaine Gannon	Kent Scism	Undecided
Remington Research Group (R)	June 24–25, 2020	500 (LV)	± 4.3%	24%	23%	19%	34%

==== Primary results ====
Republican primary results
Party	Candidate	Votes	%
Republican	Elaine Freeman Gannon	10,646	42.09%
Republican	Joshua Barrett	9,211	36.41%
Republican	Kent Scism	5,437	21.50%
Total votes		25,294	100.0%

=== General election ===
==== Results ====
Missouri's 3rd State Senate District, 2020
Party	Candidate	Votes	%	±%
Republican	Elaine Freeman Gannon	65,686	100%	+18.75%
Margin of victory		65,686	100%	
Total votes		65,686	100.0%	
Republican hold				

== District 5 ==
=== Democratic primary ===
==== Polling ====
Poll source	Date(s) administered	Sample size	Margin of error	Jeremiah Church	McFarlane Duncan	Megan Green	William Haas	Steve Roberts	Michelle Sherod	Undecided
Remington Research Group (R)	April 1–5, 2020	486 (LV)	± 4.6%	7%	1%	16%	14%	18%	9%	35%
Remington Research Group (R)	December 4–5, 2019	464 (LV)	± 4.6%	–	3%	24%	–	24%	4%	45%
Remington Research Group (R)	August 21–22, 2019	501 (LV)	± 4.5%	–	–	–	–	24%	21%	55%
Remington Research Group (R)	August 21–22, 2019	501 (LV)	± 4.5%	–	–	32%	–	23%	11%	34%

Hypothetical polling

Poll source	Date(s) administered	Sample size	Margin of error	Peter Meredith	Steve Roberts	Michelle Sherod	Undecided
Remington Research Group (R)	August 21–22, 2019	501 (LV)	± 4.5%	20%	24%	13%	43%

==== Primary results ====
Democratic primary results
Party	Candidate	Votes	%
Democratic	Steve Roberts	12,293	35.43%
Democratic	Megan Ellyia Green	11,241	32.40%
Democratic	Michelle Sherod	7,817	22.53%
Democratic	William C. (Bill) Haas	2,068	5.96%
Democratic	Jeremiah Church	893	2.57%
Democratic	McFarlane E. Duncan	387	1.11%
Total votes		35,688	100%

=== Republican primary ===
==== Primary results ====
Republican primary results
Party	Candidate	Votes	%
Republican	Michael Hebron	989	100%
Total votes		989	100%

=== General election ===
==== Results ====
Missouri's 5th State Senate District, 2020
Party	Candidate	Votes	%	±%
Democratic	Steve Roberts	56,379	87.10%	+1.80%
Republican	Michael Hebron	8,349	12.90%	−1.80%
Margin of victory		48,030	74.20%	
Total votes		64,728	100%	
Democratic hold				

== District 7 ==
=== Democratic primary ===
==== Primary results ====
Democratic primary results
Party	Candidate	Votes	%
Democratic	Greg Razer	21,042	68.99%
Democratic	Michael R. Brown	9,456	31.01%
Total votes		30,498	100%

=== Green primary ===
==== Primary results ====
Green primary results
Party	Candidate	Votes	%
Green	Nathan Kline	46	100%
Total votes		46	100%

=== General election ===
==== Results ====
Missouri's 7th State Senate District, 2020
Party	Candidate	Votes	%	±%
Democratic	Greg Razer	70,586	82.09%	+2.86%
Green	Nathan Kline	15,383	17.89%	N/A
N/A	Write-Ins	18	0.02%	N/A
Margin of victory		55,203	64.20%	
Total votes		85,987	100%	
Democratic hold				

== District 9 ==
=== Democratic primary ===
==== Primary results ====
Democratic primary results
Party	Candidate	Votes	%
Democratic	Barbara Anne Washington	17,937	88.27%
Democratic	Ryan Myers	2,383	11.73%
Total votes		20,320	100%

=== Republican primary ===
==== Primary results ====
Republican primary results
Party	Candidate	Votes	%
Republican	David Martin	2,637	100%
Total votes		2,637	100%

=== General election ===
==== Results ====
Missouri's 9th State Senate District, 2020
Party	Candidate	Votes	%	±%
Democratic	Barbara Anne Washington	51,463	82.36%	−17.64%
Republican	David Martin	11,026	17.64%	N/A
Margin of victory		40,437	64.72%	
Total votes		62,489	100%	
Democratic hold				

== District 11 ==
=== Democratic primary ===
==== Primary results ====
Democratic primary results
Party	Candidate	Votes	%
Democratic	John Joseph Rizzo (incumbent)	12,012	100%
Total votes		12,012	100%

=== General election ===
==== Results ====
Missouri's 11th State Senate District, 2020
Party	Candidate	Votes	%	±%
Democratic	John Joseph Rizzo (incumbent)	50,065	100%	+47.83%
Margin of victory		50,065	100%	
Total votes		50,065	100%	
Democratic hold				

== District 13 ==
=== Democratic primary ===
==== Polling ====
Poll source	Date(s) administered	Sample size	Margin of error	Alan Green	Angela Mosley	Tommie Pierson Jr	Undecided
Remington Research Group (R)	June 3–4, 2020	545 (LV)	± 4.2%	15%	21%	19%	45%

==== Primary results ====
Democratic primary results
Party	Candidate	Votes	%
Democratic	Angela Walton Mosley	13,580	41.21%
Democratic	Tommie Pierson Jr	13,219	40.11%
Democratic	Alan (Al) Green	6,156	18.68%
Total votes		32,955	100%

=== Libertarian primary ===
==== Primary results ====
Libertarian primary results
Party	Candidate	Votes	%
Libertarian	Jeff Coleman	83	100%
Total votes		83	100%

=== General election ===
==== Results ====
Missouri's 13th State Senate District, 2020
Party	Candidate	Votes	%	±%
Democratic	Angela Walton Mosley	64,191	87.56%	−12.44%
Libertarian	Jeff Coleman	9,122	12.44%	N/A
Margin of victory		55,069	75.12%	
Total votes		73,313	100%	
Democratic hold				

== District 15 ==
=== Democratic primary ===
==== Primary results ====
Democratic primary results
Party	Candidate	Votes	%
Democratic	Deb Lavender	27,050	100%
Total votes		27,050	100%

=== Republican primary ===
==== Primary results ====
Republican primary results
Party	Candidate	Votes	%
Republican	Andrew Koenig (incumbent)	15,519	100%
Total votes		15,519	100%

=== General election ===
==== Polling ====
Poll source	Date(s) administered	Sample size	Margin of error	Andrew Koenig (R)	Deb Lavender (D)	Undecided
Remington Research Group (R)	October 7–8, 2020	644 (LV)	± 3.8%	45%	49%	6%
Remington Research Group (R)	August 9–20, 2020	585 (LV)	± 4.0%	43%	43%	14%
Missouri Scout	May 29–30, 2019	648 (LV)	± 3.8%	50%	35%	15%

Hypothetical polling

Poll source	Date(s) administered	Sample size	Margin of error	Andrew Koenig (R)	Mark Osmack (D)	Undecided
Missouri Scout	May 29–30, 2019	648 (LV)	± 3.8%	52%	33%	15%

==== Results ====
Missouri's 15th State Senate District, 2020
Party	Candidate	Votes	%	±%
Republican	Andrew Koenig (incumbent)	61,172	53.99%	−7.04%
Democratic	Deb Lavender	52,132	46.01%	+7.07%
Margin of victory		9,040	7.98%	
Total votes		113,304	100%	
Republican hold				

== District 17 ==
=== Democratic primary ===
==== Primary results ====
Democratic primary results
Party	Candidate	Votes	%
Democratic	Lauren Arthur	16,354	100%
Total votes		16,354	100%

=== Republican primary ===
==== Primary results ====
Republican primary results
Party	Candidate	Votes	%
Republican	Mickey Younghanz	12,634	100%
Total votes		12,634	100%

=== General election ===
==== Results ====
Missouri's 17th State Senate District, 2020
Party	Candidate	Votes	%	±%
Democratic	Lauren Arthur	51,690	53.38%	−7.88%
Republican	Mickey Younghanz	45,141	46.62%	+7.88%
Margin of victory		6,549	6.76%	
Total votes		96,831	100%	
Democratic hold				

== District 19 ==
=== Democratic primary ===
==== Primary results ====
Democratic primary results
Party	Candidate	Votes	%
Democratic	Judy Baker	18,623	100%
Total votes		18,623	100%

=== Republican primary ===
==== Primary results ====
Republican primary results
Party	Candidate	Votes	%
Republican	Caleb Rowden (incumbent)	15,010	100%
Total votes		15,010	100%

=== General election ===
==== Polling ====
Poll source	Date(s) administered	Sample size	Margin of error	Caleb Rowden (R)	Judy Baker (D)	Undecided
Remington Research Group (R)	October 20–22, 2020	489 (LV)	± 4.4%	48%	48%	4%
Remington Research Group (R)	August 26–27, 2020	536 (LV)	± 4.2%	47%	42%	11%
Remington Research Group (R)	September 25–27, 2019	446 (LV)	± 4.7%	49%	45%	6%

Hypothetical polling

Poll source	Date(s) administered	Sample size	Margin of error	Caleb Rowden (R)	Judy Baker (D)	Undecided
Remington Research Group (R)	September 25–27, 2019	446 (LV)	± 4.7%	50%	44%	6%

==== Results ====
Missouri's 19th State Senate District, 2020
Party	Candidate	Votes	%	±%
Republican	Caleb Rowden (incumbent)	50,570	51.60%	+0.39%
Democratic	Judy Baker	47,367	48.33%	−0.45%
N/A	Write-Ins	72	0.07%	N/A
Margin of victory		3,203	3.27%	
Total votes		98,009	100%	
Republican hold				

== District 21 ==
=== Republican primary ===
==== Primary results ====
Republican primary results
Party	Candidate	Votes	%
Republican	Denny Hoskins (incumbent)	21,430	100%
Total votes		21,430	100%

=== Libertarian primary ===
==== Primary results ====
Libertarian primary results
Party	Candidate	Votes	%
Libertarian	Mark Bliss	151	100%
Total votes		151	100%

=== General election ===
==== Results ====
Missouri's 21st State Senate District, 2020
Party	Candidate	Votes	%	±%
Republican	Denny Hoskins (incumbent)	61,698	79.82%	+12.19%
Libertarian	Mark Bliss	15,595	20.18%	+14.70%
Margin of victory		46,103	59.64%	
Total votes		77,293	100%	
Republican hold				

== District 23 ==
=== Democratic primary ===
==== Primary results ====
Democratic primary results
Party	Candidate	Votes	%
Democratic	Richard Orr	14,370	100%
Total votes		14,370	100%

=== Republican primary ===
==== Polling ====
Poll source	Date(s) administered	Sample size	Margin of error	Bill Eigel	Dan O'Connell	Eric Wulff	Undecided
Remington Research Group (R)	June 17–19, 2020	443 (LV)	± 4.8%	33%	8%	7%	52%

==== Primary results ====
Republican primary results
Party	Candidate	Votes	%
Republican	Bill Eigel (incumbent)	15,018	71.29%
Republican	Eric Wulff	3,310	15.71%
Republican	Dan O'Connell	2,737	12.99%
Total votes		21,065	100%

=== General election ===
==== Results ====
Missouri's 23rd State Senate District, 2020
Party	Candidate	Votes	%	±%
Republican	Bill Eigel (incumbent)	57,988	57.25%	−2.91%
Democratic	Richard Orr	43,306	42.75%	+6.10%
Margin of victory		14,682	14.50%	
Total votes		101,294	100%	
Republican hold				

== District 25 ==
=== Republican primary ===
==== Polling ====
Poll source	Date(s) administered	Sample size	Margin of error	Jason Bean	Stephen Cookson	Eddy Justice	Jeff Shawan	Undecided
Remington Research Group (R)	July 8–9, 2020	436 (LV)	± 4.8%	26%	11%	23%	17%	23%
Remington Research Group (R)	July 30–31, 2019	438 (LV)	± 4.7%	–	–	17%	16%	67%

==== Primary results ====
Republican primary results
Party	Candidate	Votes	%
Republican	Jason Bean	12,791	46.18%
Republican	Jeff Shawan	5,765	20.81%
Republican	Eddy Justice	4,920	17.76%
Republican	Stephen Carroll Cookson	4,223	15.25%
Total votes		27,699	100%

=== General election ===
==== Results ====
Missouri's 25th State Senate District, 2020
Party	Candidate	Votes	%	±%
Republican	Jason Bean	58,215	100%	+30.65%
Margin of victory		58,215	100%	
Total votes		58,215	100%	
Republican hold				

== District 27 ==
=== Democratic primary ===
==== Primary results ====
Democratic primary results
Party	Candidate	Votes	%
Democratic	Donnie Owens	4,176	100%
Total votes		4,176	100%

=== Republican primary ===
==== Polling ====
Poll source	Date(s) administered	Sample size	Margin of error	Holly Rehder	Kathy Swan	Undecided
Remington Research Group (R)	July 15–16, 2020	414 (LV)	± 4.9%	51%	29%	20%
Remington Research Group (R)	August 7–8, 2019	520 (LV)	± 4.3%	26%	27%	48%

==== Primary results ====
Republican primary results
Party	Candidate	Votes	%
Republican	Holly Thompson Rehder	16,839	50.21%
Republican	Kathy Swan	16,698	49.79%
Total votes		33,537	100%

=== General election ===
==== Results ====
Missouri's 27th State Senate District, 2020
Party	Candidate	Votes	%	±%
Republican	Holly Thompson Rehder	63,644	76.88%	+2.44%
Democratic	Donnie Owens	19,135	23.12%	−2.44%
Margin of victory		44,509	53.76%	
Total votes		82,779	100%	
Republican hold				

== District 29 ==
=== Republican primary ===
==== Polling ====
Poll source	Date(s) administered	Sample size	Margin of error	David Cole	Mike Moon	Undecided
Remington Research Group (R)	July 25–26, 2020	504 (LV)	± 4.5%	34%	37%	29%
Remington Research Group (R)	April 21–23, 2020	536 (LV)	± 4.2%	15%	25%	60%
Remington Research Group (R)	July 17–18, 2019	532 (LV)	± 4.3%	14%	21%	65%

==== Primary results ====
Republican primary results
Party	Candidate	Votes	%
Republican	Mike Moon	17,781	52.49%
Republican	David Cole	16,093	47.51%
Total votes		33,874	100%

=== General election ===
==== Results ====
Missouri's 29th State Senate District, 2020
Party	Candidate	Votes	%	±%
Republican	Mike Moon	75,582	100%	
Margin of victory		75,582	100%	
Total votes		75,582	100%	
Republican hold				

== District 31 ==
=== Democratic primary ===
==== Primary results ====
Democratic primary results
Party	Candidate	Votes	%
Democratic	Raymond Kinney	7,971	100%
Total votes		7,971	100%

=== Republican primary ===
==== Polling ====
Poll source	Date(s) administered	Sample size	Margin of error	Jack Bondon	Rick Brattin	Bill Yarberry	Undecided
Remington Research Group (R)	July 21–23, 2020	403 (LV)	± 4.9%	40%	34%	6%	20%
Remington Research Group (R)	April 15–16, 2020	419 (LV)	± 4.76%	16%	18%	5%	60%

==== Primary results ====
Republican primary results
Party	Candidate	Votes	%
Republican	Rick Brattin	14,012	49.59%
Republican	Jack Bondon	12,467	44.13%
Republican	Bill Yarberry	1,774	6.28%
Total votes		28,253	100%

=== General election ===
==== Results ====
Missouri's 31st State Senate District, 2020
Party	Candidate	Votes	%	±%
Republican	Rick Brattin	63,929	71.42%	−1.01%
Democratic	Raymond Kinney	25,584	28.58%	N/A
Margin of victory		38,345	42.84%	
Total votes		89,513	100%	
Republican hold				

== District 33 ==
=== Democratic primary ===
==== Primary results ====
Democratic primary results
Party	Candidate	Votes	%
Democratic	Tammy Harty	3,274	100%
Total votes		3,274	100%

=== Republican primary ===
==== Polling ====
Poll source	Date(s) administered	Sample size	Margin of error	Karla Eslinger	Van Kelly	Robert Ross	Undecided
Remington Research Group (R)	July 27–29, 2020	503 (LV)	± 4.5%	20%	17%	39%	24%
Remington Research Group (R)	May 6–7, 2020	568 (LV)	± 4.0%	15%	12%	16%	57%
Remington Research Group (R)	July 24–25, 2019	510 (LV)	± 4.5%	–	16%	15%	69%

==== Primary results ====
Republican primary results
Party	Candidate	Votes	%
Republican	Karla Eslinger	12,704	37.12%
Republican	Robert Ross	12,562	36.71%
Republican	Van Kelly	8,958	26.17%
Total votes		34,224	100%

=== General election ===
==== Results ====
Missouri's 33rd State Senate District, 2020
Party	Candidate	Votes	%	±%
Republican	Karla Eslinger	64,891	83.81%	−16.19%
Democratic	Tammy Harty	12,533	16.19%	N/A
Margin of victory		52,358	67.62%	
Total votes		77,424	100%	
Republican hold				

== Notes ==
Partisan clients
