= Neil Smith (politician) =

American politician

Member of the Missouri House of Representatives from the 67th district
- In office January 6, 2021 – January 4, 2023
- Preceded by: Alan Green
- Succeeded by: Chantelle Nickson-Clark

Personal details
- Born: California, U.S.
- Party: Democratic
- Spouse: Jeanne
- Children: 5

Neil Smith is an American politician who served as a member of the Missouri House of Representatives from the 67th district. Elected in November 2020, he assumed office on January 6, 2021.

== Early life and education ==
Smith is a native of San Francisco. He earned a certificate in telecommunications cabling from John F. Kennedy University in Pleasant Hill, California.

== Career ==
Prior to entering politics, Smith spent 25 years in the auto industry. He moved to Missouri in 2005 and settled in St. Louis County. Smith was encouraged to run for the House by a friend, Jay Mosley. He was elected to the Missouri House of Representatives in November 2020 and assumed office on January 6, 2021.

He is running for District 67 in the 2024 Missouri House of Representatives election.
