= John Hewkin =

American politician

Member of the Missouri House of Representatives from the 120th district
- Incumbent
- Assumed office January 8, 2025
- Preceded by: Ron Copeland

Personal details
- Born: Salina, Kansas, U.S.
- Party: Republican
- Website: https://hewkinformissouri.com/lander

John W. Hewkin is an American politician who was elected member of the Missouri House of Representatives for the 120th district in 2024. His district is located in Dent and Crawford Counties.

Hewkin is a pharmacist by profession, having graduated from St. Louis College of Pharmacy in 1985. He was also a sports writer for 15 years. Hewkin served on the Crawford County R-II School Board, Crawford County Commission, Life Line Pregnancy Care Center, and the financial board of his church.

In 2023, he announced his candidacy for Missouri State Senate District 3.
