= Rich Chrismer =

American politician

Member of the Missouri House of Representatives from the 16th district
- In office January 6, 1993 – January 3, 2001
- Preceded by: Philip G. Smith
- Succeeded by: Carl Bearden

Personal details
- Born: April 9, 1946 (age 80) St. Louis, Missouri, U.S.
- Party: Republican

Rich Chrismer (born April 9, 1946) is an American politician who served in the Missouri House of Representatives from the 16th district from 1993 to 2001 and Director of Elections for St. Charles County from 2002 through 2018. Chrismer declined to run for re-election after a number of sexual misconduct allegations against him were settled by the County for $370,000.

Chrismer announced his candidacy for Missouri State Senate in 2023. The election is August 6, 2024.
