= Joe Nicola =

American politician

Joe Nicola is an American politician serving as a member of the Missouri Senate for the 11th district, representing part of Jackson County, including Independence, Sugar Creek and Grain Valley.

== Biography ==
Nicola served in the US Navy from 1984-1990. He previously operated a Kansas City motorcycle shop named Vision Cycles. He worked at Blue Springs School District from 1999-2017. He has volunteered for Youth Friends Organization in Independence, Habitat for Humanity, The Salvation Army, City Union Mission, and Independence Public School District. He lives in Grain Valley with his wife.

=== Ministries ===
Nicola was a youth pastor from 1990-1999.

In 1999, Nicola founded the non-denominational organization New Covenant Ministries in Independence. His teachings align with New Apostolic Reformation and Christian nationalism, including claims that Jesus intended to build a "world-reaching government of Heaven," describing the separation of church and state as a misnomer, and references to globalist conspiracy theories.

== Political career ==
In 2022, Nicola ran against Mike Cierpiot, who he described as the "worst Republican in our area." Following redistricting, Nicola ran for the senate seat vacated by term-limited John Rizzo and defeated challenger Robert Sauls. Nicola garnered controversy when New Covenant Ministries donated to his election PAC. Nicola argued the donations are legal as the organization is not registered with the IRS as a nonprofit, however it has been registered as a nonprofit with the state and exempt from taxes since its founding. He swore into office in January 2025.

In March 2025, Nicola conducted a two hour filibuster against a bill to subsidize the redevelopment of commercial buildings in downtown St. Louis, alleging that it would advance a globalist plot.

In 2026, Nicola sponsored legislation to lower minimum wage for minors to $12.30, down from the state minimum of $15/hour.
