= Robert T. Johnson (politician) =

American politician

Robert T. Johnson (born September 5, 1945) is an American Republican politician from Lee's Summit, Missouri. In 1972, he was elected to the Missouri House of Representatives and later served in the state senate. He currently serves on the Lee's Summit City Council for the 4th district. He was born in Kansas City.
