= Andrew McDaniel =

American politician

Member of the Missouri House of Representatives from the 150th district
- In office 2015–2023
- Succeeded by: Cameron Parker

Personal details
- Born: January 22, 1984 (age 42) Blytheville, Arkansas, U.S.
- Party: Republican

Andrew McDaniel (born January 22, 1984) is an American politician. He is a former member of the Missouri House of Representatives, representing 150th District from 2015 to 2023. He is a member of the Republican party.
