= Bill Eigel =

American politician

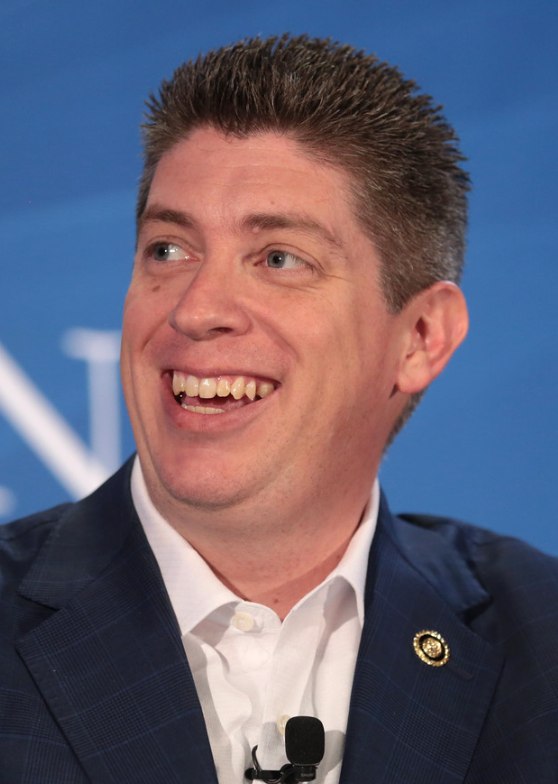
- Eigel at a Young Americans for Liberty conference, 2018

Member of the Missouri Senate from the 23rd district
- In office January 4, 2017 – January 8, 2025
- Preceded by: Tom Dempsey
- Succeeded by: Adam Schnelting

Personal details
- Born: William Charles Eigel; November 24, 1977 (age 48) Dayton, Ohio, U.S.
- Party: Republican
- Spouse: Amanda
- Children: 2
- Education: Purdue University (BS); Webster University (MBA)
- Website: Campaign website

Military service
- Allegiance: United States
- Branch/service: United States Air Force
- Years of service: 2009–2016
- Rank: Captain
- Battles/wars: Operation Enduring Freedom

William C. Eigel (born November 24, 1977) is an American politician who represented the 23rd district in the Missouri State Senate from 2017 to 2025. A member of the Republican Party, he was first elected in 2016 and assumed his seat on January 4, 2017. Eigel is a former captain in the United States Air Force, having served from 2009 to 2016.

Eigel was a candidate in the 2024 Missouri gubernatorial election, but came in second place in the primary against Lt. Governor Mike Kehoe.

== Early life and education ==
Eigel grew up in Dayton, Ohio and holds an MBA from Webster University. He attended Purdue University from 1995 to 1999 and received a BS in industrial engineering.

== Legislative tenure ==
In 2021, during the COVID-19 pandemic, Eigel called for a special session of the Missouri legislature to implement legislation to prevent private-sector companies from requiring COVID-19 vaccinations for staff and customers.

In January 2024, Eigel, along with other members of the Missouri Freedom Caucus, was stripped of his committee chairmanship and Capitol parking spot following filibusters and stalling tactics meant to force a vote on an amendment to increase barriers to citizen ballot initiatives. Senate majority leader Cindy O'Laughlin expressed willingness to expel Eigel from the senate chambers due to disruptive behavior. In summer 2024, her PAC transferred funds to Rusty Black's PAC for mailers against his gubernatorial bid.

In February 2024, Eigel and other Republicans opposed an amendment that would allow abortion in cases of rape or incest. Eigel stated that Democrats wanted to "bring back the institution of abortion so that kids can get abortions in the state of Missouri. A 1-year-old could get an abortion under this." He then said the proposed amendment "doesn't address" the "institutions of rape or of incest".

=== Gubernatorial campaign ===
In 2023, Eigel's BILL PAC was accused of using deceptive tactics to raise money for the 2024 Missouri gubernatorial election. Emails that prominently featured Donald Trump solicited small donations nationwide. As of October 2023, almost 99% of donations to BILL PAC came from out of state. In December 2025, state representative Jim Murphy filed a bill to ban misleading recurring donations in campaign fundraising that was inspired by Eigel's campaign, which continued to pull donations more than a year after he lost the primary.

Eigel attracted wide attention for a video involving a flamethrower and burning cardboard boxes with references to book burning. He has also criticized incumbent governor Mike Parson for calling for civility in politics.

== Election results ==
Missouri Senate Primary Election, August 2, 2016, District 23
Party	Candidate	Votes	%	±%
Republican	Bill Eigel	11,142	40.30%	
Republican	Anne Zerr	10,757	38.91%	
Republican	Michael (Mike) Edward Carter	5,746	20.79%	

Missouri Senate — District 23 — St. Charles County (2016)
Party	Candidate	Votes	%	±%
Republican	Bill Eigel	56,870	60.16	−39.84
Democratic	Richard Orr	34,651	36.65	+36.65
Libertarian	Bill Slantz	3,014	3.19	+3.19

Missouri Senate Primary Election, August 4, 2020, District 23
Party	Candidate	Votes	%	±%
Republican	Bill Eigel	15,018	71.29	+30.99
Republican	Eric Wulff	3,310	15.71	N/A
Republican	Dan O'Connell	2,737	12.99	N/A

Missouri Senate General Election, November 3, 2020, District 23
Party	Candidate	Votes	%	±%
Republican	Bill Eigel	57,988	57.25	−2.91
Democratic	Richard Orr	43,306	42.75	+6.10

Missouri Gubernatorial Primary Election, August 6, 2024
Party	Candidate	Votes	%	±%
Republican	Mike Kehoe	274,840	39.4	
Republican	Bill Eigel	227,012	32.6	
Republican	Jay Ashcroft	162,086	23.2	
Republican	Amber Thomsen	10,627	1.5	
Republican	Chris Wright	9,358	1.3	
Republican	Darrell McClanahan	5,637	0.8	
Republican	Robert Olson	2,975	0.4	
Republican	Jeremy Gundel	2,946	0.4	
Republican	Darren Grant	1,866	0.3	
