= Cyndi Buchheit-Courtway =

American politician (born 1976)

Member of the Missouri House of Representatives from the 115th district
- In office January 6, 2021 – January 8, 2025
- Preceded by: Elaine Gannon
- Succeeded by: Bill Lucas

Personal details
- Born: July 7, 1976 (age 50) Perryville, Missouri, U.S.
- Party: Republican
- Website: cyndi4mo.com

Cyndi Buchheit-Courtway is an American politician who served as a Republican member of the Missouri House of Representatives from 2021 to 2025, representing the 115th district.

== Career ==
Buchheit-Courtway graduated from St. Vincent de Paul High School (1994) and Jefferson County Community College (2018) and works in the healthcare industry in addition to her public office.

== Electoral history ==
Missouri House of Representatives Primary Election, August 4, 2020, District 115
Party	Candidate	Votes	%	±%
Republican	Cyndi Buchheit-Courtway	2,399	52.32%	
Republican	Ryan Jones	1,719	37.49%	
Republican	Marvin Fricke	467	10.19%	
Total votes		4,595	100.00%	

Missouri House of Representatives Election, November 3, 2020, District 115
Party	Candidate	Votes	%	±%
Republican	Cyndi Buchheit-Courtway	11,856	72.51%	
Democratic	Cynthia Nugent	4,494	27.49%	
Total votes		16,350	100.00%	

Missouri House of Representatives Election, November 8, 2022, District 115
Party	Candidate	Votes	%	±%
Republican	Cyndi Buchheit-Courtway	9,587	72.15%	−0.36
Democratic	Barbara Marco	3,701	27.85%	+0.36
Total votes		13,288	100.00%	

== Personal life ==
Buchheit-Courtway is a Christian.
