= Chris Dinkins =

American politician

Member of the Missouri House of Representatives from the 144th district
- In office 2018–2025
- Preceded by: Paul Fitzwater
- Succeeded by: Tony Harbison

Personal details
- Born: Piedmont, Missouri
- Party: Republican
- Spouse: Dave Dinkins
- Children: 2
- Education: Central Methodist University; Webster University
- Profession: Schoolteacher / UFO enthusiast

Chris Dinkins is an American politician. She was a member of the Missouri House of Representatives, from 2018 to 2025. She is a member of the Republican party.
