= Missouri General Assembly =

Legislative branch of the state government of Missouri

Type
- Type: Bicameral
- Houses: Senate; House of Representatives
- Term limits: Senate: 2 terms (8 years); House: 4 terms (8 years)

Leadership
- Senate President: David Wasinger (R) since January 13, 2025
- Senate President pro tempore: Cindy O'Laughlin (R) since January 8, 2025
- House Speaker: Jon Patterson (R) since January 8, 2025

Structure
- Seats: 197: 34 senators; 163 representatives
- Senate political groups: Republican (24); Democratic (10)
- House of Representatives political groups: Republican (106); Democratic (52); Vacant (5)
- Length of term: Senate: 4 years House: 2 years
- Salary: $41,770/year + per diem

Elections
- Last Senate election: November 5, 2024
- Last House of Representatives election: November 5, 2024
- Next Senate election: November 3, 2026
- Next House of Representatives election: November 3, 2026
- Redistricting: Legislative Commission

Meeting place
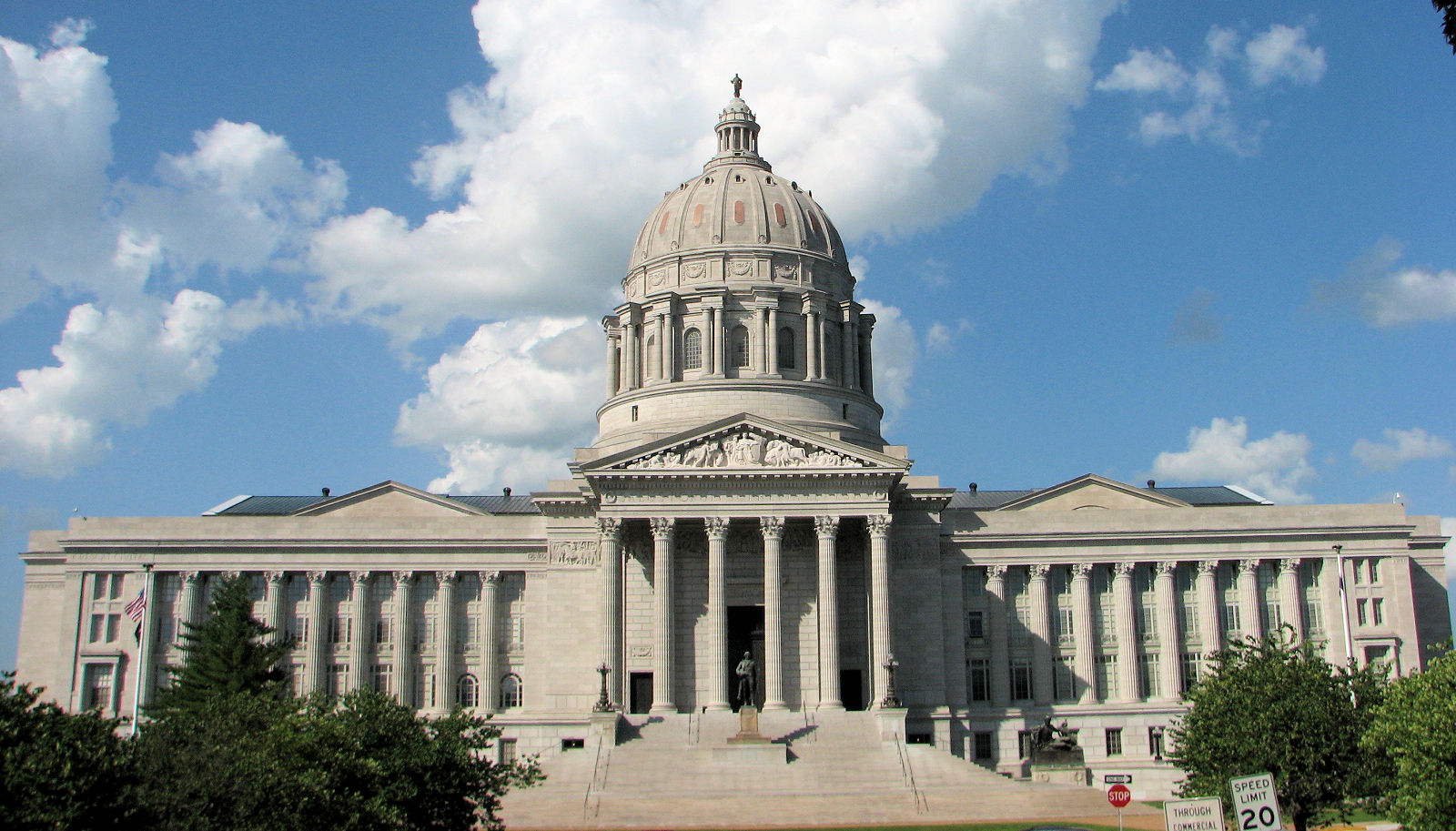
- Missouri State Capitol; Jefferson City

Website
- Missouri General Assembly

Constitution
- Constitution of Missouri

The Missouri General Assembly is the state legislature of the U.S. state of Missouri. The bicameral General Assembly is composed of a 34-member Senate and a 163-member House of Representatives. Elections are conducted using first-past-the-post voting in single-member districts of roughly equal population. Members of both houses of the General Assembly are subject to term limits. Senators are limited to two four-year terms and representatives to four two-year terms, a total of 8 years for members of both houses. The General Assembly meets at the Missouri State Capitol in Jefferson City.

Polling from Saint Louis University showed that the General Assembly enjoyed a 45% approval rating in 2024, which was considered "relatively high" compared to other government institutions.

== Qualifications ==
Members of the House of Representatives must be 24 years of age to be elected. Representatives also must be a qualified Missouri voter for two years, and a resident of the county or district of their constituency for one year. Senators must be 30 years of age, a qualified Missouri voter for three years, and similar to House qualifications, must be a resident of their senatorial constituency for one year prior to their election.

== Sessions and quorum ==
According to Article III, Section 20 of the Missouri Constitution, the General Assembly must convene on the first Wednesday after the first Monday in January following the state general election. It adjourns on May 30, with no consideration of bills after 6:00 p.m. on the first Friday following the second Monday in May. No appropriation bill may be considered after 6:00 p.m. on the first Friday after the first Monday in May. If the Governor returns a bill with his objections after adjournment sine die, the General Assembly is automatically reconvened on the first Wednesday following the second Monday in September for a period not to exceed ten days to consider vetoed bills.

The Governor may convene the General Assembly in special session for a maximum of 60 calendar days at any time. Only subjects recommended by the Governor in his call or a special message may be considered. The President Pro Tem and the Speaker may convene a 30-day special session upon petition of three-fourths of the members of each chamber.

Neither the House nor Senate, without the consent of the other chamber, adjourn for more than ten days at any one time, nor to any other place than that in which the two houses may be sitting.

As a part-time legislature, compensation is low with the General Assembly, and most senators and representatives hold jobs outside their legislative duties. Lawmakers are paid $41,770 per legislative year, plus $142.40 per diem.

== See also ==
- Missouri State Capitol
- Missouri House of Representatives
- Missouri Senate
- List of Missouri General Assemblies
- Missouri Constitutional Convention of 1861–1863
