= Adam Schnelting =

U.S. politician from Missouri

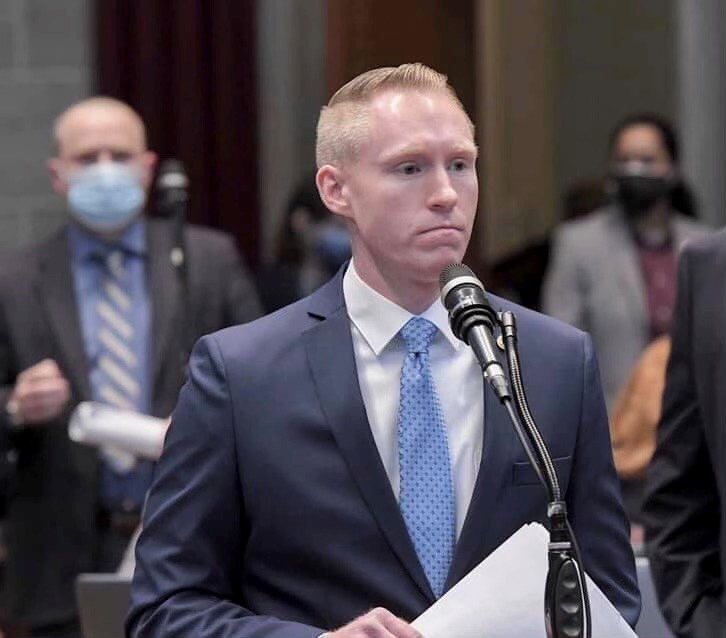
- Schnelting in 2022

Member of the Missouri Senate from the 23rd district
- Incumbent
- Assumed office January 8, 2025
- Preceded by: Bill Eigel

Member of the Missouri House of Representatives from the 69th district
- In office January 4, 2023 – January 8, 2025
- Preceded by: Gretchen Bangert
- Succeeded by: Scott Miller

Member of the Missouri House of Representatives from the 104th district
- In office January 9, 2019 – January 4, 2023
- Preceded by: Kathie Conway
- Succeeded by: Phil Christofanelli

Personal details
- Born: St. Charles, Missouri, U.S.
- Party: Republican
- Spouse: Christine
- Children: 2
- Education: Oklahoma Wesleyan University

Adam Schnelting (born 1985) is a Republican member of the Missouri Senate. He previously represented the 69th district in the Missouri House of Representatives, which primarily encompasses Harvester, Weldon Spring, and portions of St. Peters and St. Charles in St. Charles County, south of Highway 94. Schnelting was originally elected in November 2018 to serve the 104th district in the Missouri House.

== Early life, education and career ==
Schnelting is a licensed realtor, minister, and former church planter. He currently serves as a combat engineer in the Missouri Army National Guard. Schnelting is a former member of the Missouri State Defense Force and State Guard Association of the United States and is also actively involved with the National Rifle Association of America, Missouri Right to Life, and American Center for Law and Justice. Schnelting, whose family came to America in 1628, is a 7th-generation Missourian and a member of the National Society of the Sons of the American Revolution. He obtained his degree in Christian Ministry from Oklahoma Wesleyan University and his baccalaureate degree from University of Missouri St. Louis.

== Politics ==
Schnelting previously worked as a legislative assistant in the Missouri House of Representatives. In 2016, he ran in the Republican primary for the 65th house district, though lost to Tom Hannegan. Republican incumbent Kathie Conway was term-limited in 2018 from serving again in the 104th district. Schnelting ran unopposed in the August 2018 primary, then defeated Democrat Peggy Sherwin in the November general election. Schnelting received nearly 12,000 votes and won against Democratic candidate Jessica DeVoto in 2020. Due to state redistricting, Schnelting was moved to District 69, where he again faced DeVoto in the 2022 election, defeating her by a larger margin than in 2020.

He is a member of the Missouri Freedom Caucus.

Schnelting introduced HJR116, an amendment to the Missouri state constitution authorizing the creation of the Missouri Department of the National Guard, during the 2022 legislative session. The amendment was approved by Missouri voters in the 2022 general election. Prior to the amendment, the Missouri National Guard was a part of the state's Department of Public Safety.

Schnelting also authored, introduced, and passed Missouri's abortion ban. His amendment to HB126 was a "trigger law" designed to go into effect if Roe v. Wade was ever overturned by the US Supreme Court. When the court struck down Roe v. Wade on June 24, 2022, the state ban on abortion went into effect.

Schnelting sponsored legislation that some critics say would diminish oversight measures on unlicensed schools placed by HB 557, passed in 2021. Schnelting refuted criticism and said his bill will help resolve a foster care crisis in Missouri by promoting child placement while also ensuring higher oversight of currently unlicensed schools via the new "Child Protection Board" his bill would create. The board would give priority membership to Missouri Association of Christian Child Care Agencies, an association critics say is linked with Agape Boarding School, a private and unlicensed school whose abuse allegations contributed to passage of the 2021 bill. Schnelting also supported HB 557 in 2021. After deliberations, the House Committee on Children and Families overwhelmingly approved Schnelting's measure by a vote of 6–2.

Schnelting has attempted to pass legislation through both House and Senate to allow concealed carry on public transit. The 2024 version of the bill also permitted concealed carry in religious institutions and reduced requirements for concealed carry permits. It succeeded through committee, but was tabled following the 2024 Kansas City parade shooting.

In 2024, Schnelting ran for Missouri State Senate from district 23, winning over three challengers in the Republican primary. He faced Democrat Matt Williams in the general election and won 55–45%.

In 2025, Schnelting sponsored a ballot item to reverse an amendment passed by Missouri voters the previous year. The measure limits abortion procedures to cases of medical emergencies, and for cases of rape or incest only if operated before 12 weeks. The measure includes prohibition on gender-affirming care for minors, which is already mostly banned by state law. The measure was passed in the final day of legislative session, with an unusual procedural maneuver to interrupt opposition filibuster.

=== Legislative assignments ===
Representative Schnelting serves on the following committees:

- Special Committee on Homeland Security, Chair
- Emerging Issues
- Insurance Policy

== Electoral history ==
Missouri House of Representatives — District 65 Republican Primary — St. Charles County (2016)
Party	Candidate	Votes	%	±%
Republican	Tom Hannegan	2,747	51.10%	
Republican	Adam Schnelting	2,629	48.90%	
Total votes		5,376	100.00%	

Missouri House of Representatives — District 104 — St. Charles County (2018)
Party	Candidate	Votes	%	±%
Republican	Adam Schnelting	9,663	56.28%	
Democratic	Peggy Sherwin	7,507	43.72%	
Total votes		17,170	100.00%	

Missouri House of Representatives — District 104 — St. Charles County (2020)
Party	Candidate	Votes	%	±%
Republican	Adam Schnelting	11,982	58.38%	+2.10
Democratic	Jessica DeVoto	8,542	41.62%	−2.10
Total votes		20,524	100.00%	

Missouri House of Representatives Election, November 8, 2022, District 69
Party	Candidate	Votes	%	±%
Republican	Adam Schnelting	9,376	59.72%	+1.34
Democratic	Jessica DeVoto	6,325	40.28%	−1.34
Total votes		15,701	100.00%	

Missouri Senate Election, November 5, 2024, District 23
Party	Candidate	Votes	%	±%
Republican	Adam Schnelting	51,139	55.10%	
Democratic	Matt Williams	41,671	44.90%	
Total votes		92,810	100.00%	

== Personal life ==
Schnelting currently resides in St. Charles with his wife, Christine, and their children, Catherine and George.
