= Chuck Basye =

American politician

Member of the Missouri House of Representatives from the 47th district
- In office 2015–2023
- Succeeded by: Adrian Plank

Personal details
- Born: June 11, 1958 (age 68) Kansas City, Missouri, U.S.
- Party: Republican
- Spouse: Rhonda
- Children: 3
- Profession: air traffic controller

Chuck Basye (born June 11, 1958) is an American politician. He is a former member of the Missouri House of Representatives, serving from 2015 to 2023. He is a member of the Republican Party.

== Career ==
Basye served in the Marines.

Following his terms in the Missouri House, Basye entered the 2024 Missouri State Senate election for District 19 on encouragement from Cindy O'Laughlin. He has slandered opponent Stephen Webber and Webber's supporters on social media with statements including vulgarities, sexual harassment, and homophobia. Bayse justified his comments, saying that he has also received hurtful comments on the internet. He also made comments that appeared to question Webber's military service record, later telling press that he doesn't suspect Webber's record, stating "Stephen went through absolute hell in Fallujah."

== Electoral history ==
=== State representative ===
Missouri House of Representatives Primary Election, August 5, 2014, District 47
Party	Candidate	Votes	%	±%
Republican	Charles (Chuck) Basye	1,754	70.95%	
Republican	Elizabeth (Betsy) Phillips	718	29.05%	

Missouri House of Representatives Election, November 4, 2014, District 47
Party	Candidate	Votes	%	±%
Republican	Charles (Chuck) Basye	5,007	51.34%	
Democratic	John Wright	4,746	48.66%	

Missouri House of Representatives Election, November 8, 2016, District 47
Party	Candidate	Votes	%	±%
Republican	Charles (Chuck) Basye	9,532	56.05%	+4.71
Democratic	Susan McClintic	7,473	43.95%	−4.71

Missouri House of Representatives Election, November 6, 2018, District 47
Party	Candidate	Votes	%	±%
Republican	Charles (Chuck) Basye	9,082	56.77%	+0.72
Democratic	Adrian Plank	6,916	43.23%	−0.72

Missouri House of Representatives Election, November 3, 2020, District 47
Party	Candidate	Votes	%	±%
Republican	Charles (Chuck) Basye	10,831	57.36%	0.59
Democratic	Adrian Plank	8,053	42.64%	−0.59
