= Dan Houx =

American politician and businessman

Member of the Missouri House of Representatives from the 54th district
- In office January 2017 – January 2025
- Preceded by: Denny Hoskins
- Succeeded by: Brandon Phelps

Personal details
- Born: Warrensburg, Missouri, U.S.
- Party: Republican
- Education: Kemper Military School

Dan Houx is an American politician and businessman who was a member of the Missouri House of Representatives from 2017 to 2025, representing the 54th district. He was first elected in 2016.

== Early life and education ==
Houx was born and raised in Warrensburg, Missouri. He graduated from the Kemper Military School in Boonville, Missouri.

== Career ==
In addition to his career in politics, Houx has worked as a homebuilder, real estate developer, and real estate agent. Houx was elected to the Missouri House of Representatives in 2016, defeating Democratic nominee Bob Gregory. He was re-elected in 2018, 2020, and 2022.

== Electoral history ==
Houx had no opponents run against him in Republican primaries, and was thus nominated each time by default.

Missouri House of Representatives Election, November 8, 2016, District 54
Party	Candidate	Votes	%	±%
Republican	Dan Houx	10,100	66.43%	
Democratic	Bob Gregory	4,098	26.95%	
Libertarian	Steve Daugherty	1,006	6.62%	
Total votes		15,204	100.00%	

Missouri House of Representatives Election, November 6, 2018, District 54
Party	Candidate	Votes	%	±%
Republican	Dan Houx	9,201	70.41%	+3.98
Democratic	James Williams	3,866	29.59%	+2.64
Total votes		13,067	100.00%	

Missouri House of Representatives Election, November 3, 2020, District 54
Party	Candidate	Votes	%	±%
Republican	Dan Houx	12,428	74.81%	+4.40
Democratic	James Williams	4,184	25.19%	−4.40
Total votes		16,612	100.00%	

Missouri House of Representatives Election, November 8, 2022, District 54
Party	Candidate	Votes	%	±%
Republican	Dan Houx	9,475	100.00%	+25.19
Total votes		9,475	100.00%	
