= Robert Sauls =

American politician from Missouri

Member of the Missouri House of Representatives from the 21st district
- Incumbent
- Assumed office January 9, 2019
- Preceded by: Ira Anders
- Succeeded by: Will Jobe (elect)

Personal details
- Born: May 28, 1980 (age 46)
- Party: Democratic
- Education: William Jewell College
- Website: house.mo.gov/MemberDetails.aspx?year=2020&code=R&district=021

Robert Edward Sauls (born May 28, 1980) is a Democratic member of the Missouri General Assembly, representing the state's 21st House district. He currently serves as the ranking minority member on the Crime Prevention and Public Safety committee, in addition to his positions on the following committees; Fiscal Review, Insurance Policy, Judiciary, Rules - Legislative Oversight, and Special Committee on Homeland Security. On April 23, 2019, Representative Sauls was named a, "Freshman to Watch" by the Missouri Times.

== Political career ==
Robert Sauls narrowly won his three way Democratic Primary in 2018 by only 33 votes. There was no Republican opponent so Sauls was elected unopposed on 6 November 2018. Sauls has dedicated much of his tenure in the State Legislature to criminal justice reform, co-sponsoring narcotics control legislation and co-sponsoring veterans treatment courts.

In 2019, Sauls was appointed to serve on the Special Interim Committee on Oversight of Local Taxation after it was discovered that the assessment process for the 2019 year in Jackson County, Missouri might have been mismanaged resulting in some residents receiving property tax increases upward of 450%. Jackson County Assessor Gail McCann Beatty acknowledged that the system for processing assessments was "deeply flawed". Sauls became a vocal leader for the oversight and accountability of the local government in resolving the matter, co-hosting town halls and speaking out about the process.

== Professional career ==
Sauls is a Staff Judge Advocate in the United States Air Force Reserve and a former Jackson County, Missouri prosecutor. He currently works as a labor and workers compensation lawyer for Boyd Kenter Thomas & Parrish LLC in Independence, Missouri.

== Electoral history ==
Missouri House of Representatives Primary Election, August 7, 2018, District 21
Party	Candidate	Votes	%	±%
Democratic	Robert Sauls	1,341	37.28%	
Democratic	Dan O'Neill	1,308	36.36%	
Democratic	Holmes Osborne	948	26.36%	
Total votes		3,597	100.00%	

Missouri House of Representatives Election, November 6, 2018, District 21
Party	Candidate	Votes	%	±%
Democratic	Robert Sauls	8,202	100.00%	
Total votes		8,202	100.00%	

Missouri House of Representatives Election, November 3, 2020, District 21
Party	Candidate	Votes	%	±%
Democratic	Robert Sauls	7,682	50.15%	−49.85
Republican	Vicki Riley	7,637	49.85%	+49.85
Total votes		15,319	100.00%	

Missouri House of Representatives Election, November 8, 2022, District 21
Party	Candidate	Votes	%	±%
Democratic	Robert Sauls	4,033	52.21%	+2.06
Republican	Dakota Worrell	3,691	47.79%	−2.06
Total votes		7,724	100.00%	
