= Travis Smith (politician) =

American politician and businessman

Member of the Missouri House of Representatives from the 155th District
- In office January 6, 2021 – January 8, 2025
- Preceded by: Karla Eslinger
- Succeeded by: Matthew Overcast

Candidate for the Missouri House of Representatives from the 154th District
- Incumbent
- Assumed office 2026 primary election

Personal details
- Born: West Plains, Missouri, U.S.
- Party: Republican
- Education: University of Missouri; William Woods University

Travis Smith is an American politician and businessman who served in the Missouri House of Representatives from Missouri's 155th district from 2021 to 2025. He is currently a candidate for the Missouri House of Representatives in the 154th district for the 2026 election.

== Legislative career ==
Smith first won election to the 155th district seat in 2020 after defeating Democrat Mike Lind 84.8% to 15.2%. He was sworn in on January 6, 2021. During his tenure, he served as Vice-Chair of the House Ways and Means Committee and worked extensively on economic development and rural healthcare funding, notably securing capital infrastructure support for Ozarks Healthcare.

Instead of seeking re-election to the House in 2024, Smith ran for the Missouri State Senate in District 33. He faced Brad Hudson in the Republican primary on August 6, 2024, losing a close race with 47.4% of the vote to Hudson's 52.6%.

== 2026 State Representative Campaign ==
On March 31, 2026, Smith officially announced his candidacy to return to the Missouri House of Representatives, entering the Republican primary for the 154th District, which covers Howell County and the West Plains area. Running on a platform of constitutional conservatism, economic growth, and experienced representation for southern Missouri, he faces incumbent Lisa Durnell in the primary election scheduled for August 4, 2026.
