= Ron Copeland (politician) =

American politician

Member of the Missouri House of Representatives
- In office January 6, 2021 – January 8, 2025
- Preceded by: Jeff Pogue
- Succeeded by: John Hewkin
- Constituency: 143rd district (2021–2023); 120th district (2023–2025)

Personal details
- Born: Jefferson City, Missouri, U.S.
- Party: Republican
- Children: 4

Military service
- Branch/service: United States Army
- Unit: Missouri National Guard

Ron Copeland is an American politician and retired law enforcement officer who served as a member of the Missouri House of Representatives from 2021 to 2025, representing the 143rd then 120th district, after redistricting. Elected in November 2020, he assumed office on January 6, 2021.

== Early life and education ==
Copeland was born in Jefferson City, Missouri. He studied criminal justice at the University of Central Missouri and Lincoln University.

== Career ==
Copeland served in the Missouri National Guard for six years and was a trooper in the Missouri State Highway Patrol for 28 years. He was elected to the Missouri House of Representatives in November 2020 and assumed office on January 6, 2021.
