= Mike Haffner (politician) =

American politician and businessman

Member of the Missouri House of Representatives from the 55th district
- In office 2019–2025
- Preceded by: Rick Brattin
- Succeeded by: Bill Irwin

Personal details
- Party: Republican
- Spouse: Teresa
- Children: 3
- Education: Cleveland State University (BBA); Naval War College (MSS)

Military service
- Branch/service: United States Navy
- Rank: Commander

Mike Haffner is an American politician and businessman who served as a member of the Missouri House of Representatives from 2019 to 2025, representing the 55th district. He was first elected in November 2018.

== Education ==
Haffner earned a Bachelor of Business Administration with an emphasis in accounting from Cleveland State University and a Master of Science in national security and strategic studies from the Naval War College.

== Career ==
Haffner served as a pilot in the United States Navy before his retirement. During his career, Haffner was a commanding officer of an McDonnell Douglas F/A-18 Hornet and led combat air patrols over New York City after the September 11 attacks. Since retiring from the Navy, Haffner has operated a Christmas tree farm. He was elected to the Missouri House of Representatives in November 2018 and assumed office in 2019. Haffner was chair of the House Agriculture Committee and vice chair of the House Elementary and Secondary Education Committee.

== Electoral history ==
Missouri House of Representatives Primary Election, August 7, 2018, District 55
Party	Candidate	Votes	%	±%
Republican	Mike Haffner	3,110	55.62%	
Republican	Mike Vinck	1,596	28.54%	
Republican	Bing Schimmelpfening	886	15.84%	
Total votes		5,592	100.00%	

Missouri House of Representatives Election, November 6, 2018, District 55
Party	Candidate	Votes	%	±%
Republican	Mike Haffner	13,557	100.00%	
Total votes		13,557	100.00%	

Missouri House of Representatives Election, November 3, 2020, District 55
Party	Candidate	Votes	%	±%
Republican	Mike Haffner	18,583	100.00%	0.00
Total votes		18,583	100.00%	

Missouri House of Representatives Election, November 8, 2022, District 55
Party	Candidate	Votes	%	±%
Republican	Mike Haffner	12,095	100.00%	0.00
Total votes		12,095	100.00%	
