= Missouri's 9th Senate district =

American legislative district

Missouri's 9th State Senate district
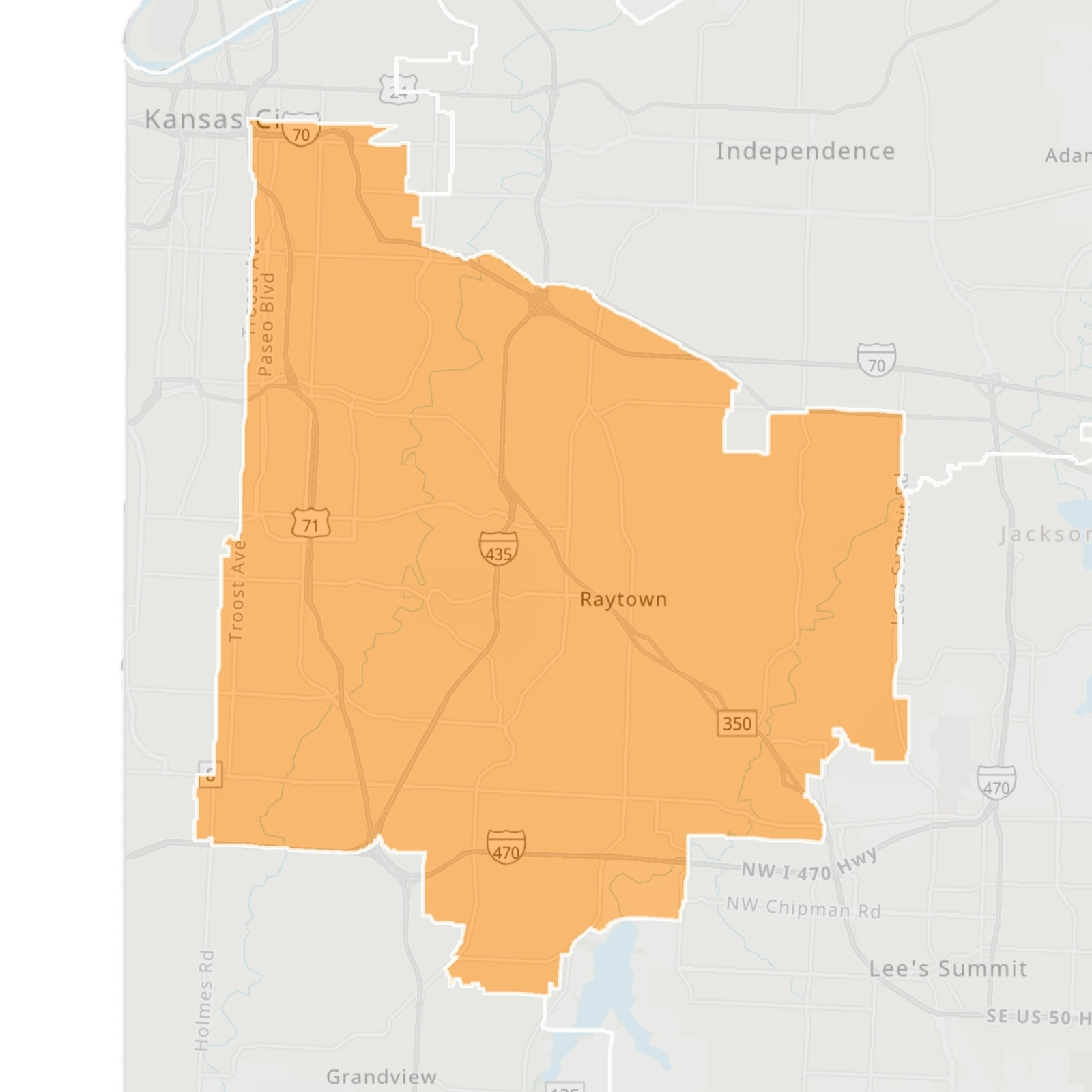
Senator
| Barbara Washington; D–Kansas City |
- Demographics: 30% White; 55% Black; 10% Hispanic; 1% Asian; 1% Other; 4% Multiracial
- Population (2023): 181,567

Missouri's 9th Senatorial District is one of 34 districts in the Missouri Senate. The district has been represented by Democrat Barbara Washington since 2021.

== Geography ==
The district is based in Kansas City, specifically the majority-Black portions of the city. Those include the southeast side of downtown, Raytown, and several other neighborhoods south of the city center. The district is also home to Arrowhead Stadium, the Kansas City Zoo, and numerous Black museums such as the American Jazz Museum, the Negro Leagues Baseball Museum, and Black Archives of Mid-America.

== Election results (1996–2024) ==
=== 1996 ===
Missouri's 9th Senatorial District election (1996)
| Party | Candidate | Votes | % |
|---|---|---|---|
| Democratic | Phil B. Curls Sr. (incumbent) | 43,341 | 100.00 |
| Total votes | | 43,341 | 100.00 |
| Democratic hold | | | |

=== 2000 ===
Missouri's 9th Senatorial District election (2000)
| Party | Candidate | Votes | % |
|---|---|---|---|
| Democratic | Mary Groves Bland | 45,855 | 100.00 |
| Total votes | | 45,855 | 100.00 |
| Democratic hold | | | |

=== 2004 ===
Missouri's 9th Senatorial District election (2004)
| Party | Candidate | Votes | % |
|---|---|---|---|
| Democratic | Yvonne S. Wilson | 56,781 | 100.00 |
| Total votes | | 56,781 | 100.00 |
| Democratic hold | | | |

=== 2008 ===
Missouri's 9th Senatorial District election (2008)
| Party | Candidate | Votes | % |
|---|---|---|---|
| Democratic | Yvonne S. Wilson (incumbent) | 59,589 | 100.00 |
| Total votes | | 59,589 | 100.00 |
| Democratic hold | | | |

=== 2011 ===
Missouri's 9th Senatorial District special election (2011)
| Party | Candidate | Votes | % |
|---|---|---|---|
| Democratic | Shalonn Curls | 11,602 | 83.42 |
| Republican | Nola Wood | 2,306 | 16.58 |
| Total votes | | 13,908 | 100.00 |
| Democratic hold | | | |

=== 2012 ===
Missouri's 9th Senatorial District election (2012)
| Party | Candidate | Votes | % |
|---|---|---|---|
| Democratic | Shalonn Curls (incumbent) | 62,964 | 100.00 |
| Total votes | | 62,964 | 100.00 |
| Democratic hold | | | |

=== 2016 ===
Missouri's 9th Senatorial District election (2016)
| Party | Candidate | Votes | % |
|---|---|---|---|
| Democratic | Shalonn Curls (incumbent) | 55,506 | 100.00 |
| Total votes | | 55,506 | 100.00 |
| Democratic hold | | | |

=== 2020 ===
Missouri's 9th Senatorial District election (2020)
| Party | Candidate | Votes | % |
|---|---|---|---|
| Democratic | Barbara Anne Washington | 51,463 | 82.36 |
| Republican | David Martin | 11,026 | 17.64 |
| Total votes | | 62,489 | 100.00 |
| Democratic hold | | | |

=== 2024 ===
Missouri's 9th Senatorial District election (2024)
| Party | Candidate | Votes | % |
|---|---|---|---|
| Democratic | Barbara Anne Washington (incumbent) | 50,220 | 79.31 |
| Republican | Derron Black | 13,103 | 20.69 |
| Total votes | | 62,489 | 100.00 |
| Democratic hold | | | |

== Statewide election results ==
| Year | Office | Results |
|---|---|---|
| 2008 | President | Obama 81.7 – 17.3% |
| 2012 | President | Obama 82.7 – 17.3% |
| 2016 | President | Clinton 77.6 – 18.6% |
| 2016 | Senate | Kander 79.8 – 16.4% |
| 2016 | Governor | Koster 79.1 – 17.5% |
| 2018 | Senate | McCaskill 80.4 – 17.2% |
| 2020 | President | Biden 79.2 – 18.9% |
| 2020 | Governor | Galloway 77.0 – 20.2% |
