= Orchid I. Jordan =

American politician

Orchid Irene (née Ramsey) Jordan (August 17, 1910 – December 25, 1995) was an American politician.

Born in Clay Center, Kansas, she graduated from Wilberforce University in Ohio in 1932 with a degree in elementary education. Ramsey married Leon Jordan on August 15, 1932. Leon Jordan served in the Missouri House of Representatives and was assassinated on July 15, 1970. Orchid Jordan succeeded her husband and then served in the Missouri House of Representatives from 1970 to 1984. She was initially a representative for Jackson county district 11, then 25 and 28. Jordan was a Democrat and lived in Kansas City, Missouri. She was a charter member of Freedom, Inc., a voting rights organization which her husband co-founded. She became a life member of the National Association for the Advancement of Colored People (NAACP) and was also a member of the National Urban League. She worked on Crime Prevention for the Kansas City Council. She was active in The Links Incorporated, a social service organization. In the early 1960s, she opened a shop in Kansas City that specialized in African and other ethnic art objects.

Jordan died on December 25, 1995, in Kansas City, Missouri. At her death, senator Phil Curls said she was "a lovely lady, always stable and steady."
