= Senator Curls =

Senator Curls may refer to:

- Kiki Curls (born 1968), Missouri State Senate
- Phil Curls (1942–2007), Missouri State Senate
