= Leon Jordan =

American politician (1905–1970)

- Born: May 6, 1905; Kansas City, Missouri, U.S.
- Died: July 15, 1970 (aged 65); Kansas City, Missouri, U.S.
- Occupations: Politician and civil rights leader
- Years active: 1951–1970
- Known for: Co-founded Freedom, Inc.

Leon Mercer Jordan (May 6, 1905 – July 15, 1970) was an African-American civil rights leader who served in the Missouri House of Representatives. Jordan was "one of the most influential African Americans in Kansas City's history" and, at the time of his assassination in 1970, the "state's most powerful black politician".

== Early years ==
Leon Jordan attended Lincoln High School in Kansas City, Missouri, served in the United States Army, and graduated from Wilberforce University in Ohio in 1933. He married fellow Wilberforce student Orchid Irene Ramsey on August 10, 1932.

== Career ==
After graduation, Jordan worked as a schoolteacher.

He joined the Kansas City Police Department (KCPD) in 1938, rising to the rank of detective. He took a leave of absence in 1947 and spent eight years training the police forces of Liberia. As a pilot, Jordan flew his own plane around the country. In 1948, he helped coordinate the rescue of the French High Commissioner of West Africa and sixteen other French officials after their plane made a forced landing. Jordan was awarded the Chevalier of the Order of the African Star by Liberian President William Tubman in 1948.

In 1951, Jordan became a life member of the National Association for the Advancement of Colored People (NAACP). He returned to Kansas City in February 1952 and was promoted to police lieutenant, the first African-American to hold that rank in the KCPD's history. However, he discovered that he had little power in the department, so he resigned and went back to Liberia for three years. Jordan returned to Kansas City permanently in the mid-1950s and purchased the Green Duck Tavern.

=== Civil rights and politics ===
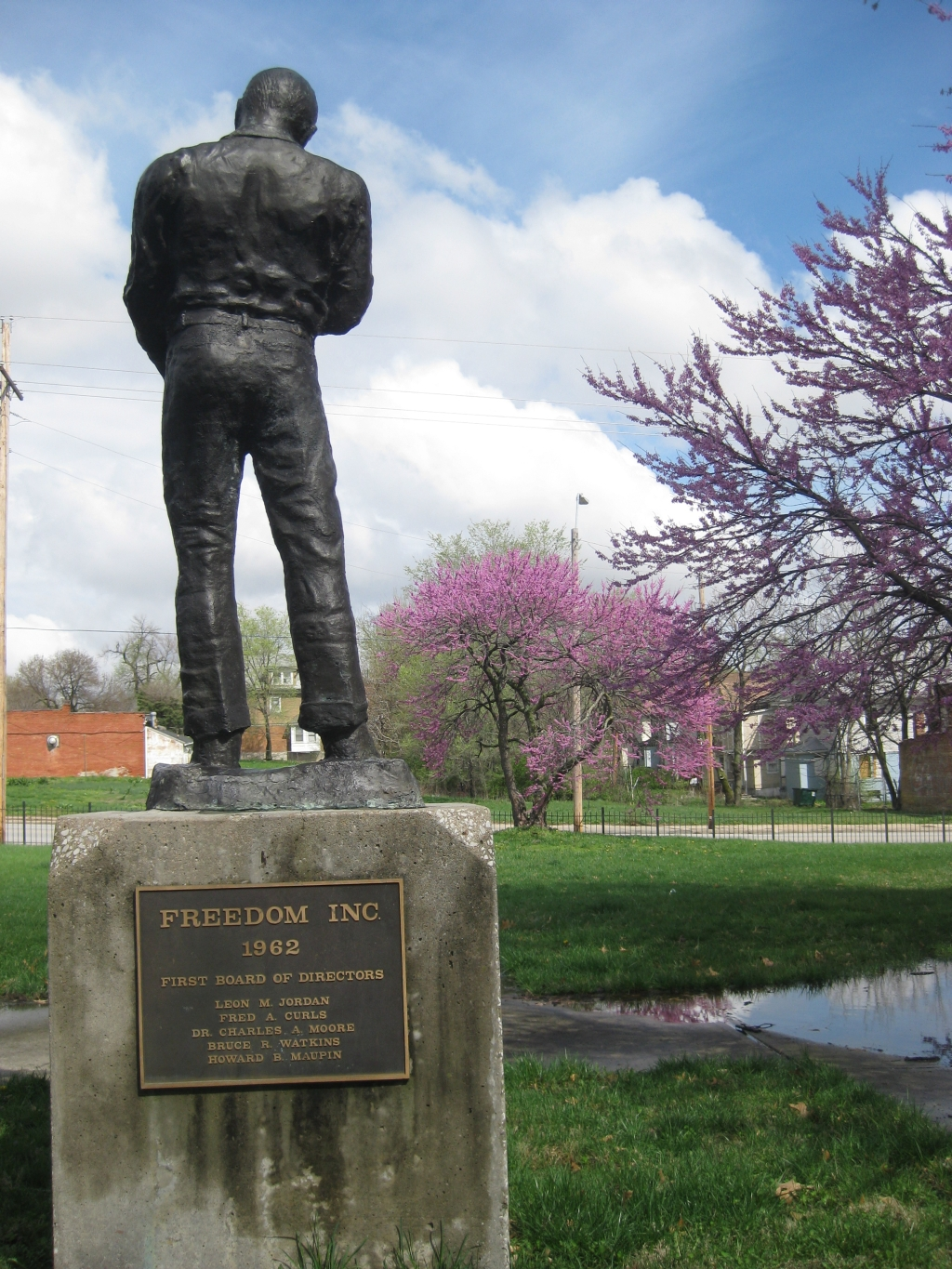
A statue and park memorializing Jordan was dedicated May 17, 1975. A plaque commemorating Freedom, Inc. was later placed on the back of the statue's base.

In 1958, Jordan became a Democratic committeeman for the 14th Ward of Kansas City. In 1962, Jordan and Bruce R. Watkins co-founded Freedom, Inc., an organization which advocated political awareness among African-Americans in the city by organizing a massive voter registration drive and promoting black political candidates. In 1963, Jordan and Watkins helped pass an accommodations ordinance, desegregating all public facilities in Kansas City.

In 1964, Freedom, Inc. put forward eight candidates for office, seven of which won. Among them was Jordan, who was elected to the first of three terms in the Missouri House of Representatives. Jordan was campaigning for a fourth term at the time he was murdered. Shortly before his death, he described himself as a "radical", adding, "I'm not a conformist but there are bounds of reason."

== Assassination ==
At about 1:00 a.m. on July 15, 1970, Jordan was killed just outside his Green Duck Tavern by three shotgun blasts. Eyewitnesses reported that the three killers were black. The shotgun had been stolen and was abandoned immediately. When it was recovered, it was traced to a burglary five years earlier in Independence, Missouri. Three men were arrested for the murder, including at least one affiliated with a criminal group called the "Black Mafia". One man was acquitted, and charges were dropped against the other two suspects.

Upon his death, his widow, Orchid I. Jordan, became a candidate for his legislative seat. She won the election, and served for sixteen years in the Missouri House of Representatives. She died on December 25, 1995, at the age of 85.

=== Murder weapon ===
Jordan was killed using a Remington 12-gauge Wingmaster shotgun, which was one of several firearms that had been stolen from a hardware store in Independence in 1965. A January 1966 report on the burglary by the Independence Police Department stated that the guns had later been sold through a "North End Italian fence". This report was not discovered in the initial investigation of Jordan's murder, but was uncovered by investigative journalists working for the Kansas City Star in 2010. When the reporters asked the KCPD about the shotgun, they were told that it had been lost in 1973. The shotgun may have been sold in a police surplus auction. Some time later, the KCPD purchased the used shotgun from a gun store and did not check the serial number. The shotgun was refurbished and placed into police service.

On November 5, 1997, a police officer used the shotgun to shoot and wound an armed suspect in North Kansas City. The weapon was analyzed by the crime lab, who failed to identify it as the Jordan murder weapon, and it was returned to police service the following year. Only when the Star asked questions about the missing shotgun in 2010 did a crime lab technician run a computer check that located the gun, which was recovered from the trunk of a police car and then returned to the evidence room.

=== 2010 investigation ===
In 2010, Kansas City Star reporters began investigating the assassination while preparing for coverage of the 40th anniversary of Jordan's death. This led to discovery of the missing murder weapon and some old fingerprint cards, which persuaded the KCPD to re-open their investigation into the department's oldest cold case. Civil rights leader Alvin Sykes pressed the KCPD for a complete investigation. In trying to determine who was responsible for the assassination, the Star reported that Jordan and Freedom, Inc. had been opposed to the "North End" faction in Kansas City politics, a group under the influence of the Italian-American Mafia which had previously controlled black voting blocs. In 1965, Jordan had punched Frank Mazzuca, a fellow state legislator who was alleged to have supported mob interests in Jefferson City, and reportedly faced death threats in the aftermath.

The Star reported that police informants associated with the Black Mafia had described the killing as a favor to North End mob interests, and that it was organized by "Shotgun Joe" Centimano, owner of a local liquor store. The informants claimed that Centimano had supplied the murder weapon and recruited the killers. The Star further reported that one informant stated the assassination had elements of both a "contract killing" and a "revenge killing", and that another said it was "all about politics". News coverage referred to a 900-page police report finished in 2011 which concluded that mob boss Nicholas Civella had given his "blessing" to Jordan's assassination. No one was indicted because all of the alleged perpetrators were deceased by then.

== Legacy ==
The Leon M. Jordan Memorial Park, located at 31st Street and Benton Boulevard in Kansas City, features a statue of Jordan and a plaque on the front of its base. Behind the statue of Jordan is the Monument to Freedom, Justice and Courage. The statue was dedicated on May 17, 1975, five years after his death. The Freedom Wall intends to highlight individuals that have significantly impacted the African American community in Jackson County, with an emphasis on unknown, unsung champions of civil rights, equality and excellence. Names are still being added through a nomination process to the Jackson County Freedom Wall Commission.

Individuals on the wall include:

Title	Name	Contribution
	Adams, Clinton Jr.	Politics
Pastor	Henderson, L. Bell	Faith/Religious
	Cadenhead, Clarence "C.B."	Youth Development
	Coles, Richard Thomas "R.T."	Education
	Curls, Melba	Politics
	Dickinson, J. Erik	Youth Development
	Evans, Virginia "Dee"	Community Activist
	Franklin, Chester A.	Entrepreneurship
	Gibson, Elvis E. "Sonny"	Community Historian
	James, Sylvester "Sly" Jr.	Politics / Community Services
	Bass, Tom	Entrepreneurship
	Blankinship, G. Lawrence Sr.	Entrepreneurship
Doctor	Cameron, Jeremiah	Civil Rights / Education
	Crews, James	Community Service
	Curls, Shalonn "Kiki"	Politics
	Diuguid, Lewis	Media
Reverend	Ewing, Thomas H.	Faith / Religion
Doctor	Fullard, Jasper Jr.	Healthcare / Medicine
	Goldblatt, Lawrence	Neighborhood Leadership
	Jefferson, Jessie	Community Service
	Bates, Mike	Civil Rights
	Bowser, James Dallas	Education / Media
	Canady, Cynthia Elaine	Community Service
	Crews, Nelson C.	Neighborhood Leadership
	Daniel, Damon L.	Community Activist
	Dixon, Anita	Education
	Fambrough, William L.	Community Historian
Judge	Gaitan, Fernando J. Jr.	Law / Justice
	Grant, Gwendolyn	Education
Reverend Doctor	Johnson, A. L. Sr.	Faith / Religion
	Bowman Becks, Ida M.	Community Engagement
Doctor	Bryant, Girard T.	Education
Doctor	Carr, David A. Sr.	Civil Rights / Entrepreneurship
	Franklin, Ada Crogman	Arts / Entertainment
	Daniels, Fletcher	Politics
	Dunn, Randy D.	Politics
	Gardner, Isaac Jr.	Education
	Hill-Suber, Gayle	Community Activist
Judge	Johnson, Carl R.	Law / Criminal Justice
	Bell, Bobby	Sports
	Bush, Jack	Sports
	Charity, Diane	Neighborhood Activist
	Crosthwaite, Minnie Lee	Community Service
	Dean, Gilbert "Mickey"	Law / Justice
	Ellis, E. Frank	Healthcare / Medicine
	Forte, Darryl	Community Service
Major	Gates, Charles A. "Pops"	Community Historian
	Huggins, L. C. "Speedy"	Arts/Entertainment
	Johnson, Charles	Neighborhood Leadership
	Hickman, Dawn C.	Community Organizing / Engagement
	Huell, Whitney	Arts / Entertainment
	Macklin, Patricia Jones	Community Organizing / Engagement
Reverend Doctor	Hill, Robert Lee	Faith / Religious
	Huskey, Venessa	Community Organizing / Engagement
	King, Waymond	Youth Services
	McDonald, Shirley	Entrepreneurship
	Montgomery, Ina	Education
Doctor	Holliday, Gayle	Politics
	Israelite, Steve	Philanthropy
	Kitchen, Alice	Civil Rights / Activism
	McKelvy, Earline	Education
	Morales, Jerry	Sports
	Horn, Justice	Community Organizing / Engagement
	Jackson, Elise	Community Organizing / Engagement
	Lopez-Galvan, Lisa	Media
	Mims, Bonnaye	Politics
Doctor	Myers, Sere S. Sr.	Healthcare / Medicine
	Howard, Wilhemina E. "Nina"	Healthcare / Medicine
	Johnson, Barbara J.K.	Neighborhood Leadrship
	McCoy, Tonja	Education
Pastor	Abel, Earl	Faith / Religious
	Becker, Leslie	Healthcare / Medicine
	Brooks, Alvin	Community Engagement
	Bryant, Mark	Politics
Reverend	Cleaver, Emanuel II	Politics
	Curls, Fred	Politics
	Eason, Samuel	Youth Development
	Grace, William	Education
Reverend Doctor	Hartsfield, Wallace S.	Civil Rights
	Holliday, Harold Sr.	Law / Criminal Justice
	Alaadeen, Ahmad	Arts / Entertainment
	Bell, Rose	Education
Pastor	Brooks, John L.	Faith / Religious
Reverend	Butler, Leonard P.	Faith / Religious
Judge	Clymer, Lewis W.	Law / Criminal Justice
	Curls, Philip B.	Politics
	Fain, Pearl	Law / Criminal Justice
	Graham, Ike	Community Organizing
	Hazley, Charles	Politics
	Holliday, Harold "Doc" Jr.	Politics
	Allen, Preston Sr.	Faith / Religion
	Bland, Mary Groves	Politics
	Sanders Brooks, Sharon	Civil Rights
	Carter, Andrew & Mildred	Media
	Coe, Carol	Politics
	Daniels, Sybil	Social Engagement
	Gates, Ollie	Entrepreneurship
Judge	Gray, Jon	Law / Criminal Justice
	Hazley, Dean	Civil Rights
	Holmes, Daniel Arthur (DA)	Civil Rights
Pastor	Allen, Preston Jr.	Faith / Religious
	Bluford, John	Healthcare / Medicine
	Thuston Brown, Cora Pearl	Arts / Entertainment
	Reams Carter, Estella	Civil Rights
	Collins, Joanne	Community Activist
	Leon Dixon, Lester	Education
	Gibson, Lyle	Community Historian
	Harrington, George	Entrepreneurship
	Herron, William J.	Education
Honorable	Hughes, Leonard Jr.	Law / Criminal Justice
	Bacchus, Kenneth	Politics
	Bluford, Lucile	Media
	Brown, Melvin	Community Engagement
	Howard Clark, William	Civil Rights
	Crompton, Dwayne	Education
	Dorsey, Olivia	Media
	Glover, Esther	Neighborhood Leadership
	Harris, Alex	Business
Doctor	Hill, Julia	Education
	Hughes, Mamie	Civil Rights
Doctor	Nash, Troy	Business
	North, Glenn	Arts / Entertainment
	Perry, Henry	Business
	Neal, Calvin	Community Organizing / Engagement
	Owens, GG	Community Organizing / Engagement
	Persley, Kathryn	Community Organizing / Engagement
	Randolph, Kimberly M.	Community Organizing / Engagement
	Slaughter, Karen	Neighborhood Leadership
	Newman, Dina	Neighborhood Leadrship
	Parks-Shaw, Ryana	Politics
Pastor	Piggee-Wallack, Alice	Community Organizing / Engagement
Judge	Sachs, Howard F.	Civil Rights / Activism
	Small, Shafeeqa	Community Organizing / Engagement
	Newsome, Cynthia	Media
Doctor	Patel, Amy	Healthcare / Medicine
	Price, Carl	Education
Reverend	Sample, Tex	Civil Rights / Activism
Doctor	Snorgrass, Joseph	Education
	Newsome, Edward J.	Business
	Pelofsky, Brenda	Healthcare / Medicine
Reverend	Rambo, Rickey D.	Faith / Religious
	Humphrey, Willie	Philanthropy
Reverend Doctor	Jones, Mac Charles	Civil Rights
	Kendrick, Bob	Sports
	McShann, Jay	Arts / Entertainment
Doctor	Perry, John Edward	Healthcare / Medicine
	Simmons, Marilyn	Education
	Sykes, Alvin	Civil Rights
	Watkins, Bruce R.	Politics
	James, Rosa	Civil Rights
Doctor	Jones, Marion	Healthcare / Medicine
	Lowe, Rosemary S.	Neighborhood Leadership
Reverend Doctor	Miles, John Modest	Faith / Religious
Doctor	Peterson, Carl	Healthcare / Medicine
	Hubbard, Wayne / Price, Candice	Media
	Robinson, Melissa	Healthcare / Medicine
	Smith, Charles Ashley	Business
	Thomas, Earl D.	Politics
	Webster, Ajamu	Education
	Johnson, Dorothy	Philanthropy
	Jordan, Leon	Civil Rights
Referend	Mann, Samuel E.	Civil Rights
	Nunnelly, Jim	Mentoring
	Peterson, Horace	Community Historian
	Ragsdale, Helen	Education
Doctor	Rodgers, Samuel U.	Healthcare / Medicine
	Smith, Lena Rivers	Media
Reverend Doctor	Thompson, Nelson "Fuzzy"	Civil Rights
	Webster, Joe	Philanthropy
	Johnson, Harold & Myrtle	Sports
	Jordan, Orchid	Politics
	Martin, Sanders	Philanthropy
	O'Neil, John "Buck"	Sports
	Peterson, Walter	Politics
Reverend	Ray, Kenneth	Civil Rights
	Ross, Eva	Civil Rights
Judge	Spottsville, Clifford	Law / Criminal Justice
	Pouncey Thurman, Leona	Law / Criminal Justice
	Wilson, Yvonne	Politics
	Johnson, Herman	Philanthropy
	Kaiser, Inez Y.	Business
	Mattox, Joe Louis	Community Historian
	Pemberton, Lounneer	Civil Rights
Doctor	Peterson, Walter R.	Healthcare / Medicine
	Richardson, MC	Media
	Russell, Anita	Civil Rights
	Swinton, Lee Vertis	Politics
Bishop	Tindall, James D.	Civil Rights
	Wimes, Charles	Business
	Stafford, Erik	Community Organizing / Engagement
	Thomas, Joseph	Community Organizing / Engagement
	Walker, Lewis George	Media
	Wheeler, Robert R.	Education
	Stapleton, Carrie	Media
	Thomason, Quiana	Healthcare / Medicine
	Washington, Barbara Anne	Politics
	Williams, Bridgette	Business
	Stapleton, Leon	Business
	Tillman, Lafayette A.	Civil Rights / Activism
	Welch, Archie	Politics
PhD	Williams, Carmaletta	Education
	Steward, Wilhelmina L.	Community Organizing / Engagement
Doctor	Wagner, Jacob A.	Education
	Wesson, Eric L.	Media
	Wilson, Toi	Neighborhood Leadership
	Wimes, Michelle	Healthcare / Medicine
	Taylor, Marquita	Neighborhood Leadreship
	Wainright, Calvin Carzell	Youth Services
	Westbrooks, Gloria J.	Education
Judge	Wimes, Brian C.	Law / Criminal Justice
Doctor	Woods, Gerald	Healthcare / Medicine
	Johnson, Deitra	Community Service
	Jordon, Marion Sr.	Entrepreneurship
	Lopez, John	Civil Rights
	McQueen, Clude	Business
	Nunnelly, Janice Linzie	Neighborhood Leadership
	Pierson, Emmet Jr.	Community Development
Judge	Roque, Kit Carson Jr.	Law / Criminal Justice
	Street, Reuben	Entrepreneurship
Doctor	Unthank, Thomas C.	Healthcare / Medicine
Judge	Hardwick, Lisa White	Law / Justice
	Johnson, Lynn E.	Youth Development
	Keith, Gertrude	Community Activist
	Lucas, Quinton	Politics
	Mason, Rosie	Community Service
	Paige, Leroy "Satchel"	Sports
	Ramos, John F. Jr.	Healthcare / Medicine
Mayor	Ross, Carson	Politics
	Strozier, Pamela A.	Education
Lieutenant Colonel	Warren, Clifford	Community Service
	Williams, Marjorie A.	Education
	Jones, Lawrence A. Sr.	Entrepreneurship
	Kelly, Mary L.	Community Activist
	Lyons, Henry E.	Entrepreneurship
	Maxwell, Donald L.	Community Development
	Parker, Charlie "Bird"	Arts / Entertainment
Councilman	Reed, Jermaine	Politics
	Sanders, Willie	Youth Development
	Thompkins, William J.	Healthcare / Medicine
	Watson, Robert Michael "Bobby"	Arts / Entertainment
Chief	Wilson, Edward Wade Jr.	Community Service
	Jones, Nettie	Entrepreneurship
	Klice, Arrington "Bubble"	Youth Development
	Beatty, Gail McCann	Politics
	Moten, Bennie	Arts / Entertainment
Doctor	Patterson-Hazley, Melissa	Community Activist
	Robinson, Ah'Lee E.	Youth Development
	Smith, David A.	Youth Development
Bishop	Tolbert, Mark C.	Faith / Religious
	Webster, Thomas	Community Activist
	Yates, Aaron "Tech N9ne"	Arts / Entertainment
	Jordon, Denise E.	Entrepreneurship
	Kurtz, John	Civil Rights
	McKittrick, Lillian L.	Labor / Community Activist
	Botley, Don B.	Youth Development
	Rogan, Charles Wilber "Bullet"	Sports
	Smith, Willie Arthur	Youth Development
	Turner, Joseph Vernon "Big Joe" Jr.	Arts / Entertainment
	White, Frank Jr.	Sports / Politics
	Yates, Josephine Silone	Civil Rights / Education
	Aiken, Tyrone	Arts / Entertainment
Reverend	Bacote, Samuel W.	Faith / Religion
	Bodden, Joshua	Arts / Entertainment
	Clarke, Pat	Neighborhood Leadership
	Haney-Galvin, Edith	Community Organizing / Engagement
	Alcine, Klassie	Community Organizing / Engagement
Doctor	Beatty, Kimberly	Education
	Calderon, Gwendolyn Russell	Business
Doctor	Davis, Derald	Education
	Harris, Christopher	Youth Services
	Allen, Beverly C.	Education
	Boyd, Carl	Education
	Carroll, Greg	Arts / Entertainment
Doctor	Ellis, Auburn E.	Entrepreneurship
Doctor	Allen, Charles H.	Business
	Brice, Erika	Civil Rights / Activism
Doctor	Charles, Michael	Education
	Garcia, Rafaela "Lali"	Civil Rights / Activism
	Anderson, Edward Walter	Business
	Williams, Hazel Browne	Education
	Smith, Nathaniel Clark	Education
	Green, Carol	Community Organizing / Engagement

Jordan's papers, including extensive documentation of his service in Liberia, are collected in the library of the University of Missouri's Kansas City campus. He is the topic of a documentary called A Legacy of Leadership, directed by Emiel Cleaver and funded by a 2019 Rocket Grant from the Charlotte Street Foundation. Its release was scheduled for July 2020, in conjunction with the 50th anniversary of Jordan's death.

In 1948, Liberian President William Tubman awarded him Chevalier of the Order of the African Star.

== See also ==
- List of assassinated American politicians
- List of unsolved murders (1900–1979)
