= Robert M. Farnsworth =

American author and academic (1929–2022)

Robert Farnsworth
- Born: Robert Merle Farnsworth; May 5, 1929; Detroit, Michigan, U.S.
- Died: March 7, 2022 (aged 92); Kansas City, Missouri, U.S.
- Children: 5

Academic background
- Education: University of Michigan (BA); Tulane University (PhD)

Academic work
- Discipline: English
- Sub-discipline: Literary criticism Biography
- Institutions: Wayne State University; University of Missouri–Kansas City

Robert Merle Farnsworth (May 5, 1929 – March 7, 2022) was an American author and academic who worked as a Professor Emeritus of English at the University of Missouri–Kansas City. He wrote about prominent literary figures and civil rights activists including Melvin B. Tolson and Leon Jordan.

== Early life and education ==
Farnsworth was born in 1929 in Detroit, Michigan. He graduated from the University of Michigan and earned a PhD from Tulane University in 1957.

== Career ==
Farnsworth wrote a biography of assassinated civil rights leader Leon Jordan. Jordan had helped to found a political organization known as Freedom, Inc. before his long-unsolved murder. Farnsworth had met Jordan in 1961 and said he was "in awe of him."

He also wrote a biography of poet Melvin B. Tolson titled Melvin B. Tolson, 1898-1966: Plain and Poetic Prophecy. The book was reviewed in World Literature Today. In Rhetoric at the Margins: Revising the History of Writing Instruction in American Colleges, 1873-1947, author David Gold wrote, "Robert M. Farnsworth's finely balanced and carefully researched biography does little worse than suggest that Tolson's love for argumentation may have intimidated his children, who nonetheless respected him and loved him dearly." Farnsworth also edited Caviar and Cabbage: Selected Columns by Melvin B. Tolson from the Washington Tribune, 1937-1944. The book included selections from a weekly newspaper column on black culture that Tolson had written for seven years.

He authored a biography of journalist Edgar Snow titled From Vagabond to Journalist: Edgar Snow in Asia, 1928--1941. The work was described in Kirkus Reviews as a "resonant briefing on an American who bore eloquent witness to a turning point in Asian history." The book was one of two Snow biographies published in 1996.

Farnsworth was an emeritus professor of English at the University of Missouri–Kansas City.

== Personal life ==
Farnsworth died at his home in Kansas City on March 7, 2022, survived by his wife and five children.

== Works ==
- Richard Wright, Impressions and Perspectives (co-edited with David Ray), University of Michigan Press, 1973.
- Edited with afterword, Melvin B. Tolson's A Gallery of Harlem Portraits, University of Missouri Press, 1982.
- Edited with introduction, Caviar and Cabbage: Selected Columns by Melvin B. Tolson from the Washington Tribune, 1937-1944, University of Missouri Press, 1982.
- Melvin B. Tolson, 1898-1966: Plain Talk and Poetic Prophecy, University of Missouri Press, 1984.
- Edited with commentary, Edgar Snow's Journey South of the Clouds, University of Missouri Press, 1991.
- From Vagabond to Journalist: Edgar Snow in Asia, 1928-1940. University of Missouri Press, 1996.
