= Sandra Lee Reeves =

American politician

Member of the Missouri House of Representatives from the 30th district
- In office January 5, 1983 – January 6, 1993
- Preceded by: Mary Groves Bland
- Succeeded by: John A. Birch

Member of the Missouri House of Representatives from the 19th district
- In office January 3, 1979 – January 5, 1983
- Preceded by: Gerald J. Roderick
- Succeeded by: Thomas Barklage

Personal details
- Born: October 19, 1942 (age 83) Lake Charles, Louisiana
- Party: Democratic

Sandra Lee Reeves (born October 19, 1942) is an American politician who served in the Missouri House of Representatives from 1979 to 1993.
