= Stop the Killing KC =

Non violence movement

Entrance of Stop The Killing KC headquarters building, October 2012.

Stop The Killing KC is a community improvement organization in Kansas City, Missouri patterned after "stop the violence/stop the killing" movements in other large American cities, urged since 1985 by Minister Louis Farrakhan of the Nation of Islam movement, and drawing on lessons learned in past decades by many other community improvement organizations such as urban development programs in various U.S. Cities and evangelical or social outreach programs of various churches, religions or groups.

== History ==
The Kansas City organization became unofficially established with a Declaration of Unity signed by Nation of Islam Student Minister Vincent Muhammad, Pastor Tony R. Caldwell of Community United KC, Kenneth "Sasteh Meter" Mosley of EMWOT (East Meets West of Troost), and more than three dozen other community improvement activists on September 17, 2011.

After several meetings and discussions in ensuing weeks, Pastor Caldwell, Captain Muhammad, Sasteh Meter Mosley, and other community leaders met at the Bruce R. Watkins Cultural Heritage Center on Feb. 11, 2012 and called for all interested persons to meet the following Saturday, February 18, and create a working organization. On March 3, 2012, an organizational meeting elected officers, including a President and Vice-President, but in mid-May policy disagreements among officers resulted in that organizational structure being abandoned for a seven-member Advisory Council. Stop The Killing KC was formally incorporated on March 14, 2012, with a dedicatory "open house" April 7, 2012. In flyers publicizing the event, Stop the Killing KC lists more than seventy "partners" as being supportive in a "Stop The Killing KC Coalition":

A Newly Adopted Cleanup, Aldi's, Amen Par Ankh, Amen Ankh Urban Farm, American Indian Council, Aim for Peace, Black United Front, C&A Contracting, C.A.C., CASA Veterans Institute, Inc.., The Chess Club, Church of Christ, City of Kansas City, New Community United KC, COOL Wayne, C.U.M.F.H. Property, Durham & Williams, EMWOT(East Meets West of Troost), Eternal Life Church & Family Life Center, Fade N Aces, First Time Correctional Services of KC, FOCUSED, Green Griot, Habitat for Humanity, Happy Foods Grocery, Heart of America Ministries, Help ALL, Inc., Hip Hop Community, Infidelity Annihilators, Inc., Kansas City Fire Dept., Kansas City Parks & Recreation, KC Helping Hands, KCPD, KD Construction, Key Coalition, King Richard, L.I.N.K., Littlejohn for Sheriff, Man Up Program, Mazuma Credit Union, Morning Star Baptist Church, My Brother's Keeper, NAU, Occupy KC, PeaceKeepers, Penny Mill, Pinnacle Career Institute, Price Chopper, R.E. Bishop Construction, Inc., Roxann Grocia, Samuel Rogers, Save A Child, Save Tomorrow's Outstanding People, Second Chance Program, Servants for Jesus, Simply Designed, Swope Health Services, S.T.O.P., Teola Powell, Troost Fest, Tycor Community Development Corp., TSD Sound, The Church of Jesus Christ, The Nation of Islam Mosque 30, PLAN, The Salvation Army, Truly Concerned Youth & Adults, Underground Railroad, Urban Life Ministry, Urban Work Force, Vatterott College, Voices of the People, Whatsoever Community Center, Women in Motion, Wonder Bread, Women's Coalition, Youth Wagon Productions.

== Activities ==
Participants at the second "3 on 3" Basketball tournament hosted by Stop The Killing KC Coalition on July 29, 2012

Activities the group has encouraged or sponsored include vigils and funerals for deceased victims of violence, crime investigation, distributing flyers at busy intersections, canvassing crime-hit neighborhoods, voter registration drives, daily and nightly classes, Study Groups, like- Literacy for youth and adults, Health and Wellness awareness and food program, feeding youth and children through the summer and after school, urban agriculture, vocational green career opportunities and seminars, participation in events such as Kansas City's Troost Festival on April 28, 2012; the annual Convoy of Hope festival on June 16, 2012 and so forth. On the afternoon of July 1, 2012, the STK-KC held a "3 on 3" basketball tournament, Missouri State Representative Brandon Ellington participated, and Kansas City's Chief of Police Darryl Forte visited, as well as other community leaders and basketball players and fans from around the city. On July 29, 2012, STK-KC hosted a second 3 on 3 tournament "Shoot Baskets- Not Bullets!", and scheduled two basketball events for every month throughout the summer of 2012.

== Incidents ==
On May 14, 2012 a Kansas City woman named Andrea Shields was murdered and her body then set on fire. Stop the Killing KC and other anti-violence organizations held vigils for and coordinated funeral arrangements for Shields. The funeral was scheduled for 2 p.m. Saturday, May 26, 2012. Shortly after 4 a.m. that morning, a drive-by shooter fired eight bullets toward Stop the Killing KC's headquarters building, seven rounds lodging in a vehicle parked in front of the building, one round chipping siding near the building's "Stop the Killing KC" sign. Allegedly, someone phoned Kansas City's "Tips Hotline" the day before, and demanded that Stop the Killing KC '"back off from the Andrea Shields investigation"'. Because Stop The Killing KC is a "Crime Prevention" and pro-Civil Rights organization, Federal Law Enforcement agencies are investigating the incident along with Kansas City police.
