= Randy D. Dunn =

Missouri State Representative

Randy Darnale Dunn
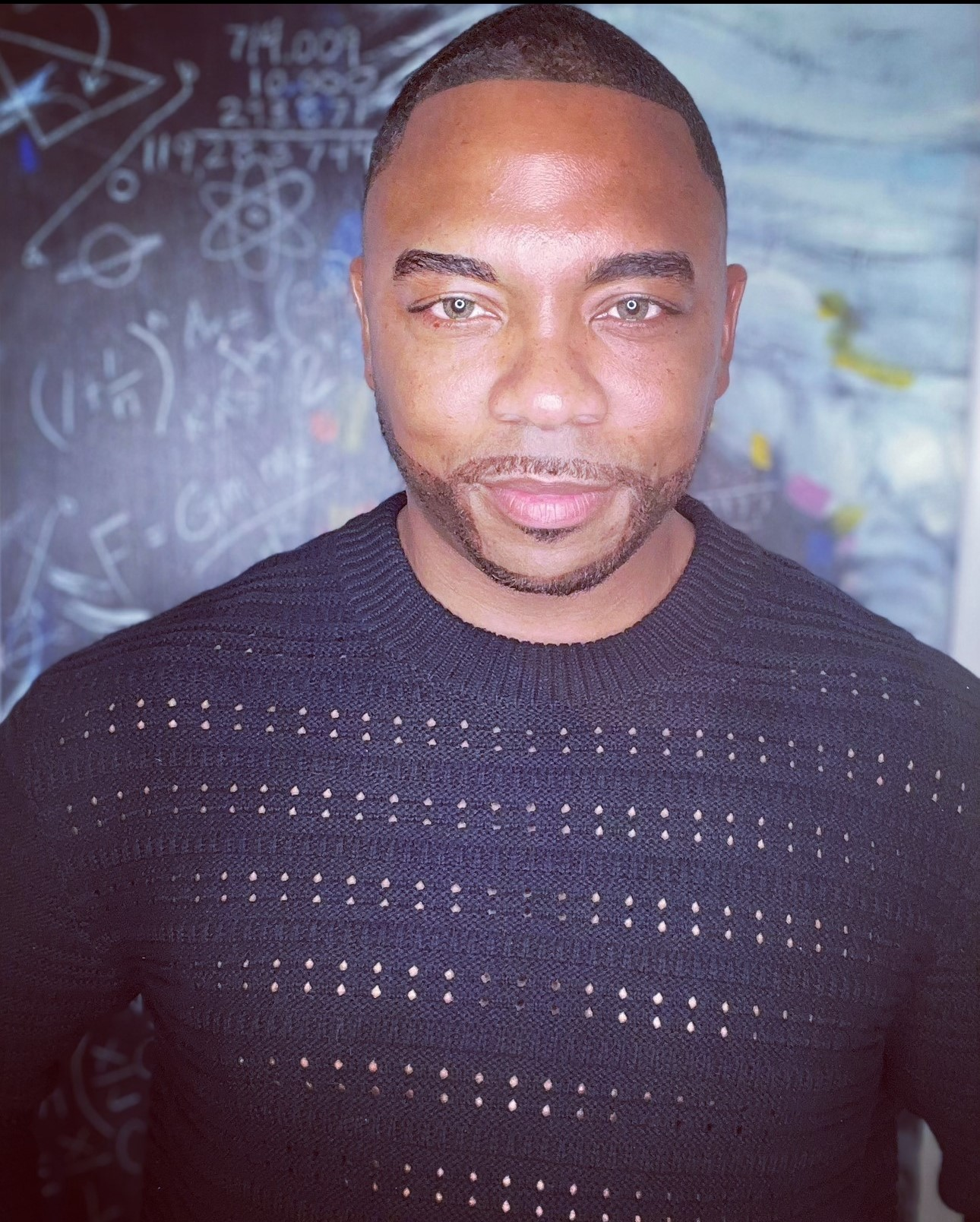

Member of the Missouri House of Representatives from the 23rd district
- In office 2012–2017
- Succeeded by: Barbara Washington

Personal details
- Born: November 18, 1982 (age 43) Kansas City, Missouri, US
- Party: Democratic
- Domestic partner: Angel Ortiz
- Education: University of Missouri-Kansas City
- Occupation: Politician, Planner, Business Owner

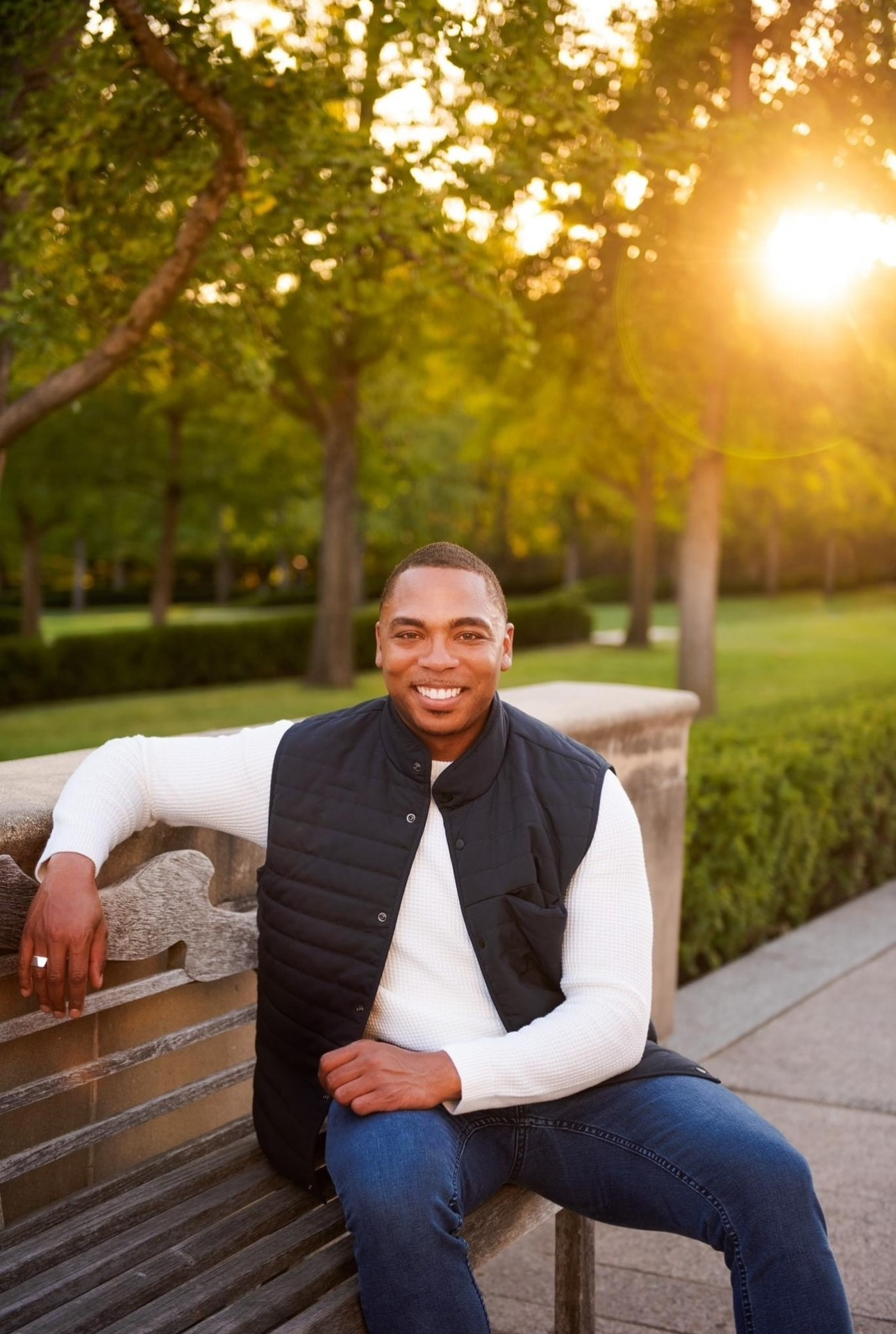

Randy D. Dunn is prominent political figure and community leader in Missouri. He is a former member of the Missouri House of Representatives from the 23rd District. Dunn was first elected in 2012 at the age of 29 and was reelected in 2014 and 2016. He formerly worked as a staff member for US Congressman Emanuel Cleaver II and as the Executive Director for the Missouri Democratic Party. Currently, he is the Community Development Director for a local municipality.

== Early life and career ==
Dunn was born on November 18, 1982, in Kansas City, Missouri, to Randy Dunn and Janice Dunn. His mother, Janice Dunn, is a former Democratic Committeewoman for the 18th Ward in Jackson County, Missouri. Dunn is the youngest of four brothers and is a distant relative of Oscar Dunn, the former Lt. Governor of Louisiana and the first African American elected to statewide office in the Country.

Dunn graduated from Raytown South High School where he actively participated in track and served on the student council. In 2021, Dunn was honored with induction into the Raytown Alumni Hall of Fame. He earned his bachelor of arts and master of public administration degrees from the University of Missouri Kansas City where he was also a United States Department of Housing and Urban Development Fellow and attended law school. In 2021 Dunn received a professional certificate in Citizen Politics in America from Harvard. In 2025, Dunn began work on his doctorate in public administration from West Chester University.

Throughout his life, Dunn has been actively engaged in the community. He serves on various boards, holding positions such as Chair of the Nu World Contemporary Danse Theatre, as well as being a member of the Kansas City Regional Transit Authority and Executive Board member of Freedom, Inc. Dunn is also a member of Alpha Phi Alpha fraternity and previously served as President of the Omicron Xi Lambda chapter.

== Career ==
Following the completion of his graduate studies, Dunn began his professional career as a city planner for the City of Kansas City, Missouri. Dunn served in this role from 2007 to 2012. In 2007, he also earned his real estate license and obtained a professional certificate in economic development. Additionally, Dunn is the owner and managing partner of Dean & Dunn LLC, a consulting firm based in Kansas City. Dunn previously owned and operated JetKC an online men's clothing boutique. He has extensive experience in community and economic development.

In addition to his professional roles, Dunn was elected as Vice-Chair of the House Democratic Caucus and as Democratic Committeeman for the 2nd Ward of Jackson County, Missouri. In 2017, Dunn resigned from the Missouri Legislature to accept a position in Omaha, Nebraska as founding executive director of a nonprofit community development intermediary. In 2021, Rep. Dunn was named executive director of the Missouri Democratic Party, again making history as the first openly gay person of color to serve in this position.

In 2022 Randy recorded and released an electronic dance song titled "You're the One" under the moniker Randy D.

== Election history ==
In early 2012, Dunn declared his candidacy for the office of State Representative for the 23rd District, a newly established district resulting from redistricting. Demonstrating robust community support, Dunn emerged victorious in the 2012 election, prevailing over Derron Black and Erik Stafford in the August 7th primary. With no opposition in the November 6th general election, he assumed office on January 9, 2013. His election marked a historic moment as Dunn became the first openly gay person of color elected to any office in Missouri's history.

In 2014, Dunn sought a second term. Running unopposed in both the Democratic primary and the subsequent general election, he was sworn into office on January 7, 2015.

Dunn secured a third term in 2016, defeating Derron Black once again in the primary and facing no opposition in the November general election. He took the oath of office on January 4, 2017.

=== Elections ===
Missouri 23rd District State Representative Democratic Primary Election: 2012
Party	Candidate	Votes	%	±%
Democratic	Randy D. Dunn	1,502	64.5	Winner
Democratic	Erik K. Stafford	505	21.7	
Democratic	Derron L. Black	322	13.8	'"`UNIQ−−ref−00000019−QINU`"'

Missouri 23rd District State Representative Elections: 2012
Party	Candidate	Votes	%	±%
Democratic	Randy D. Dunn	10,667	100	Winner'"`UNIQ−−ref−0000001E−QINU`"'

Missouri 23rd District State Representative Democratic Primary Elections: 2014
Party	Candidate	Votes	%	±%
Democratic	Randy D. Dunn	1,758	100	Winner

Missouri 23rd District State Representative Elections: 2014
Party	Candidate	Votes	%	±%
Democratic	Randy D. Dunn	3,254	100	Winner'"`UNIQ−−ref−00000027−QINU`"'

Missouri 23rd District State Representative Democratic Primary Elections: 2016
Party	Candidate	Votes	%	±%
Democratic	Randy D. Dunn	1,758	77.99	Winner
Democratic	Derron L. Black	496	22.01	

Missouri 23rd District State Representative Elections: 2016
Party	Candidate	Votes	%	±%
Democratic	Randy D. Dunn	8,673	100	Winner'"`UNIQ−−ref−00000030−QINU`"'

== Committee assignments ==
=== 2017–2018 ===
Representative Dunn served on the following committees:

- Elections and Elected Officials
- Budget
- Consent and House Procedure – (Ranking Member)
- Subcommittee on Appropriations – Agriculture, Conservation, Natural Resources, and Economic Development- (Ranking Member)
- Urban Economic Development – (Chair)
