= Frank Mazzuca =

Frank Mazzuca may refer to:

- Frank Mazzuca (American politician) (1905–1969), state legislator in Missouri
- Frank Mazzuca (Canadian politician) (1922–2009), local politician in Sudbury, Ontario, Canada
