= Mary Groves Bland =

American politician (1936–2016)

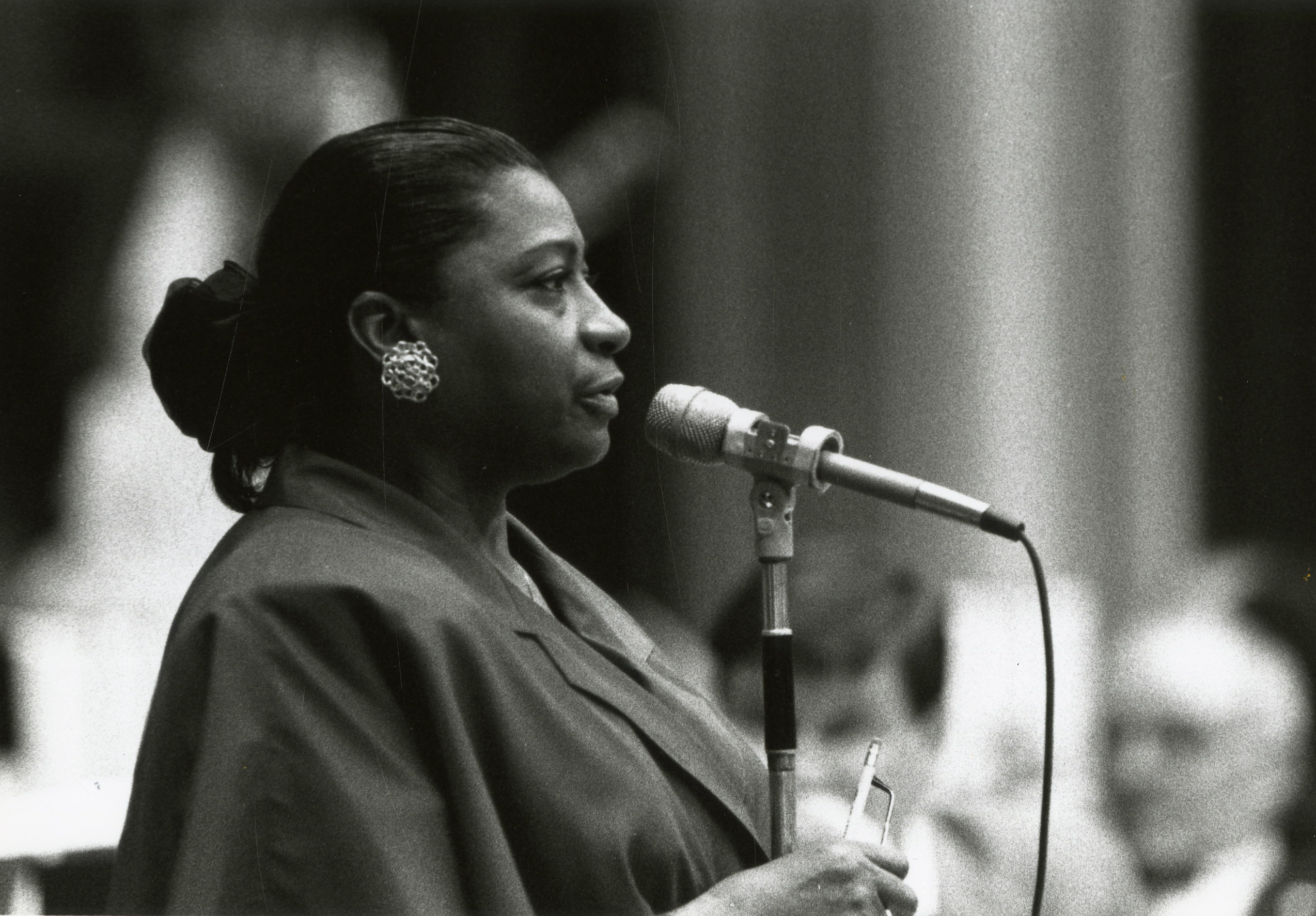

Member of the Missouri Senate from the 9th district
- In office 1998 – January 5, 2005
- Preceded by: Phil Curls
- Succeeded by: Yvonne S. Wilson

Member of the Missouri House of Representatives from the 43rd district
- In office January 5, 1983 – 1998
- Preceded by: Robert F. Sego
- Succeeded by: Terry Riley

Member of the Missouri House of Representatives from the 30th district
- In office January 7, 1981 – January 5, 1983
- Preceded by: Phillip P. Scaglia
- Succeeded by: Sandra Lee Reeves

Personal details
- Born: January 24, 1936 Kansas City, Missouri
- Died: February 19, 2016 (aged 80) Chattanooga, Tennessee
- Party: Democratic

Mary Groves Bland (January 24, 1936 – February 19, 2016) was an American politician and advocate for mental health and health services who served in the Missouri House of Representatives from 1981 to 1998 and in the Missouri Senate from the 9th district from 1998 to 2005.

She died from complications related to Alzheimer's disease on February 19, 2016, in Chattanooga, Tennessee at age 80.

== Biography ==
Bland was born in Kansas City, Missouri. She was educated at Ottawa University, Penn Valley Community College, and Pioneer College. She had four children.

=== Political career ===
Bland served as a democratic politician in the Missouri legislature for nearly three decades. She served as a member of the Missouri House of Representatives from the 43rd district from 1981 to 1998 and the Missouri Senate from the 9th district from 1998 to 2005. Throughout her time in office her goals were to help to improve social and economic justice for people of color, especially women and children.

Bland dedicated herself to improving the holistic health of her community, especially for its citizens of color and underserved populations. By 1987, she became the Chair of the Health and Public Safety Committee, Chair of Health and Mental Health Appropriation, and sat on the committees for Secondary and Higher Education and on Ways and Means Committee.

While serving in these capacities, Bland was directly responsible for the establishment of the Minority Health Issues Task Force and later the Missouri Office of Minority Health. These efforts were instrumental in addressing issues such as infant mortality, mental health challenges, and other health disparities in underserved communities.

During her career Bland participated in a number of additional committees, boards, and commissions including the U.S. Commission on Civil Rights and the National Black Caucus of State Legislators Executive Board. She was also the former president of Freedom Inc., an influential black political organization in Kansas City. She was active in the Missouri Legislative Black Caucus throughout her career and instrumental in holding an annual Martin Luther King Jr. celebration at the state capitol.

Bland announced her retirement in 2004 and served out the end of her term as State Senator until January 2005.
