= Michael Johnson (Missouri politician) =

American politician

Member of the Missouri House of Representatives from the 23rd district
- Incumbent
- Assumed office January 9, 2021
- Preceded by: Barbara Washington
- Succeeded by: Tony Van Trece (elect)

Personal details
- Party: Democratic

Michael Johnson is an American politician who currently serves as a member of the Missouri House of Representatives from the 23rd district. He succeeded Democrat Barbara Washington.

== Missouri House of Representatives ==
=== Committee assignments ===
- Economic Development
- Health and Mental Health Policy
- Insurance

== Electoral history ==
Missouri House of Representatives Primary Election, August 4, 2020, District 23
Party	Candidate	Votes	%	±%
Democratic	Michael Johnson	1,810	55.13%	
Democratic	Derron Black	1,473	44.87%	
Total votes		3,283	100.00%	

Missouri House of Representatives Election, November 3, 2020, District 23
Party	Candidate	Votes	%	±%
Democratic	Michael Johnson	8,756	100.00%	
Total votes		8,756	100.00%	

Missouri House of Representatives Election, November 8, 2022, District 23
Party	Candidate	Votes	%	±%
Democratic	Michael Johnson	4,555	100.00%	
Total votes		4,555	100.00%	
