= Community United KC =

Community United KC or New Community United of Kansas City Missouri is a charitable organization founded in 1997, in conjunction with a friendly basketball game between reported "drug dealers" and staff of Jackson County, Missouri Prosecutor's office, and today provides housing, mentoring, and various other social outreach programs and activities. Community United KC is funded by donations and by other charitable agencies, and works closely with Kansas City Police Department and Kansas City's existing social services framework to provide liaisons between the disenfranchised, and leadership of Kansas City's public and private sectors.

== Mission ==
The group and its clientele are ethnically and religiously-mixed, accepting and drawing upon common themes in diverse religious beliefs ranging from Christianity to Islam to Scientology to the Latter-day Saint Movement, to Soka Gakkai Buddhism and so forth: its Mission Statement recommends that personnel and clientele pursue "belief in God". Beginning with a September 17, 2011 meeting and a declaration signed by dozens of community activists in Kansas City wishing to do whatever they could to help "stop the violence" or "stop the killing" in the area, Christian Pastor Tony Caldwell of Community United KC (lately also named "New Community United KC") along with Captain Vincent Muhammad of the Nation of Islam (NOI) shepherded the establishment on March 3, 2012, of a formal organization "Stop The Killing KC" whose mission statement was that day voted to remain the same as the mission statement for Community United KC:"...to take our City and Youth back from the drugs, poverty, poor health care, crime activities, and most of all Low Education and to restore high family morals with a strong ties to Religion with GOD always first."

== History ==
A version of the group's outline history is as follows:

Community United KC was first formed to help shut down several drug houses in Kansas City, Missouri in 1997.

The group was asked to sponsor a basketball game between the Jackson County Missouri Prosecuting Attorneys' Office and Kansas City Missouri Police Department, and local drug dealers. The "bet" was that if the drug dealers lost, they would shut down 80% percent of their drug houses; if the police and prosecutors' departments lost the game, the police department and prosecutors' office would help with a re-education and jobs program for all involved in the basketball game.

After the game, Community United's popularity grew throughout Kansas City. In 1998 the group started a movement in the Vineyard Gardens to stop one of the most crime-ridden areas which Kansas City had ever experienced. Out of a two-bedroom house Community United started a job-training program and reading program, and budgeted programs and places where young people could come to get on computers and hang out and talk to some mentors.

=== Charlie Parker Square Tenant's Association ===
This went over so well that the Kansas City Missouri City Council in 1999 asked Community United to help spread more programs throughout Kansas City. They took on a housing complex called Charlie Parker Square where local gangs had taken over to the point where management was run out of their own offices. But the men and women of Community United started a Tenants Association and showed the tenants how to reclaim their apartment complex. The lower level of the clubhouse was transformed into a community center by Community United with games, computers, tutoring and after-school programs, cooking classes and lots more for the tenants and surrounding areas of Charlie Parker Square.

=== Partnership with Harvesters ===
In the year 2000, Community United moved to 9th Street and Prospect Avenue, where the programs grew to include feeding not only the kids in the neighborhood, but the entire Northeast Kansas City Missouri community. They partnered with Harvesters to start bringing in semi-trucks of food to be distributed to the public. The first load was 3 semi-truckloads of canned goods, cereals, meats and vegetables. They fed over 5,000 families.

=== Post-release renovation program ===
In 2001 they hosted the first community debate for city council in a religious sanctuary. This put Community United in the forefront of political developments within Kansas City. The year 2002 saw the birth of the housing program where persons coming out of jail or off the streets were given the opportunity to work on building a house and learning skills and sometimes moving into the houses they helped create. This program helped renovate much of the blight in the city's urban core.

In 2003-2011, Community United started neighborhood cleanups, the group attracted more than 150 members who helped with cleanups, community projects, mentoring programs, after-school programs, meal provision programs, and much more.

=== Friends of Construction ===
In 2004 there was an outcry about construction industry in Kansas City area not having enough minority laborers. Out of the controversy grew the group "Friends of Construction" which monitored and helped train minorities in the field of construction and skilled building.

=== Prospect Avenue Corridors violence ===
The year 2005 was unfortunately a record year for homicide rates in Kansas City, Missouri. Once again, Kansas City turned to Community United to help with the Prospect Avenue Corridor murders, the gun violence, and to help bring together a "Peace Summit" between rival gangs of Kansas City. Community United began patrolling the streets all hours of the night, and this helped lead to the arrest of those allegedly responsible for the "Corridor" killings. In May of 2005, Community United was involved in the "Troost [Avenue] Fest[ival]". Its members slept on the streets nearby the night before, to pray for peace and start the Festival on a somber note.

=== Thanksgiving Day food parcels ===
In 2006, Community United was able to rally enough support throughout Kansas City to sponsor 12 semi-Truckloads of food to be distributed the day before Thanksgiving Day. This fed more than 16,000 families, and the event was reported by CNN.

=== Peacekeepers ===
In 2007, there was reportedly a shooting or murder every other day in Kansas City. Missouri. Community United called for a "State of Emergency" on the Kansas City Missouri Council floor, and for a march which then came from all four directions to end up on the crime-ridden intersection of Linwood Boulevard and Prospect Avenue. Out of the success of this march came a plea to all the men and fathers of Kansas City Missouri to "stand up" and become peacekeepers: The group "Peacekeepers" was formed, and over five hundred African-American men accepted and acted upon the concept that "it takes a whole village to raise one child."

In 2008, the "Peace Keepers" reclaimed more of the city, with more after-school programs, mentoring programs, and they appointed neighborhood block captains, and neighborhood watches.

In 2009-2011, Community United concentrated on the abandoned houses and vacant lots, and strengthening the housing programs to help with the homeless.

These are just some of the accomplishments of Community United throughout the past fifteen years.

== New Community United KC ==
From 2010, the "New Community United/A Better Tomorrow", formed to help today's youth find a better world. In teaming up, all are able to help and work from one end of Kansas City to the other end as one big, loving hand.

In 2011, the New Community United has brought together some ninety percent of all the community improvement groups in Kansas City Missouri, working in conjunction with another new movement in KCMO: Stop The Killing KC
