= Tony Van Trece =

American politician

Troy Van Trece

Member-elect of the Missouri House of Representatives from the 23rd district
- Assuming office January 2027
- Succeeding: Michael Johnson

Personal details
- Party: Democratic

Troy Van Trece is an American politician. A member of the Democratic Party, he is the member-elect for the 23rd district of the Missouri House of Representatives.
