= Melba Curls =

American politician

Melba J. Curls (born October 3, 1941) is a former American Democratic politician who served in the Missouri House of Representatives. She was married to former Missouri state senator Phil Curls.

Born in Kansas City, Kansas, she formerly served on the board of the National Kidney Foundation. Curls also attended the University of Missouri.
