= Barbara Washington =

American politician and attorney

Member of the Missouri Senate from the 9th district
- Incumbent
- Assumed office January 6, 2021
- Preceded by: Kiki Curls

Member of the Missouri House of Representatives from the 23rd district
- In office January 10, 2018 – January 6, 2021
- Preceded by: Randy Dunn
- Succeeded by: Michael Johnson

Personal details
- Born: Barbara Anne Washington
- Party: Democratic
- Education: University of Missouri (BA); Avila University (MBA); University of Missouri–Kansas City (JD)

Barbara Anne Washington is an American politician and attorney who currently serves as a member of the Missouri Senate from the 9th district. Elected to the Senate in 2020, she was previously a member of the Missouri House of Representatives for the 23rd district from 2018 to 2021.

== Early life and education ==
Washington is a native of Kansas City, Missouri. She earned a Bachelor of Journalism degree in News-Editorial from the Missouri School of Journalism a Master of Business Administration from Avila University, and a Juris Doctor from the University of Missouri–Kansas City School of Law.

== Career ==
Washington was elected to the Missouri House of Representatives in a 2017 special election for the 23rd district. She was sworn in on January 10, 2018. Washington was re-elected in 2018. In 2020, Washington declined to seek re-election to the house and instead ran for the 9th district of the Missouri Senate. Washington defeated Ryan Myers in the Democratic primary and Republican nominee David Martin in the November general election.

== Personal life ==
Washington has one daughter and two grandsons. She is a member of Alpha Kappa Alpha sorority, St. James United Methodist Church, Freedom, Inc., the Urban Summit, the Kansas City Boys/Girls Choir, the United Nations Association of Greater Kansas City, and serves as a Trustee for the Metropolitan Community Colleges.

In December 2020, Washington declared bankruptcy, citing high student loans and low pay due to working as a public servant rather than as a lawyer. She stated that she intends to repay the debt, and that the bankruptcy would not affect her work as a Senator.
