= Bruce R. Watkins =

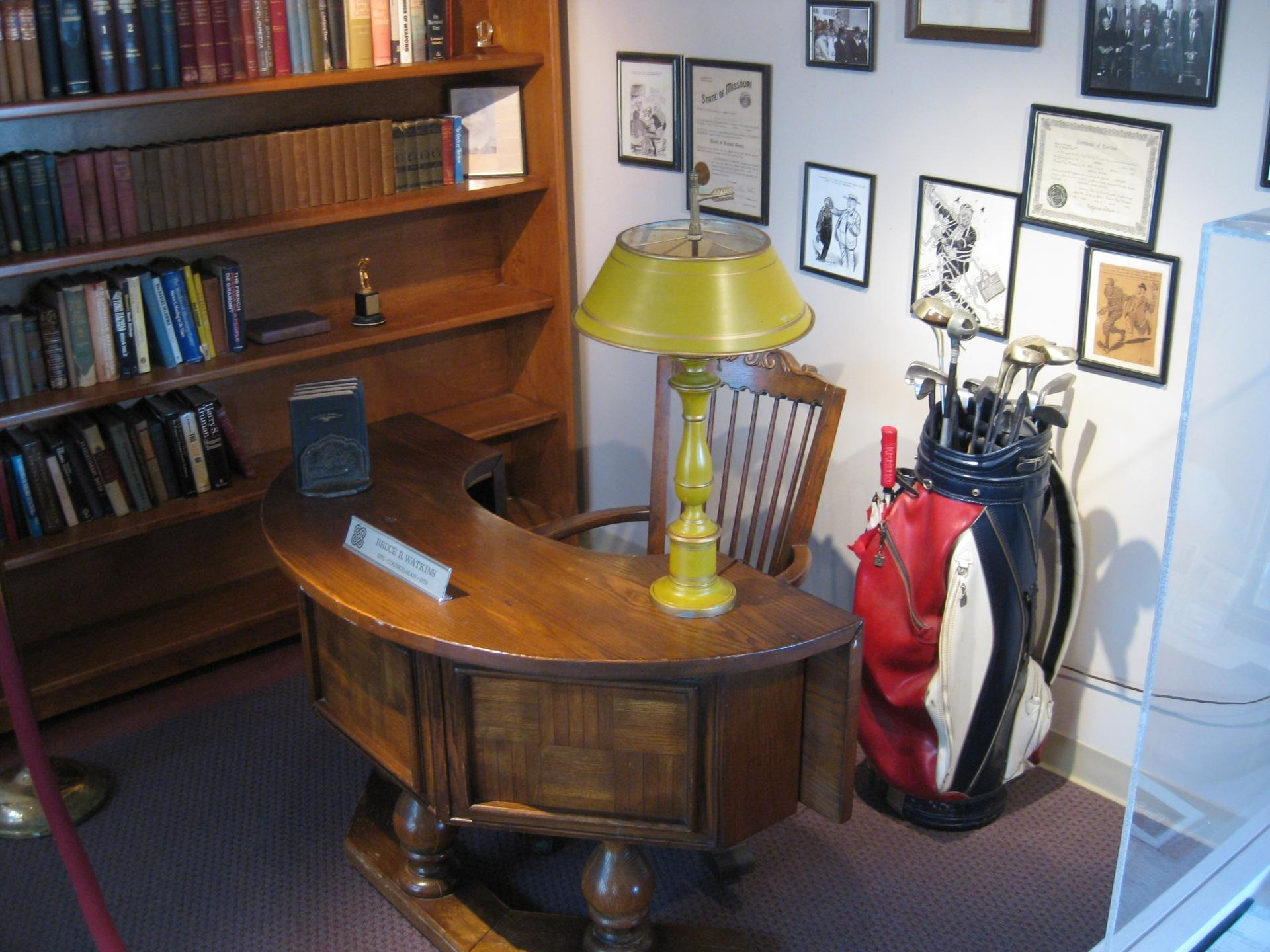
Bruce R. Watkins office environment, re-created and on display at the Bruce R. Watkins Cultural Heritage Center in Kansas City Missouri

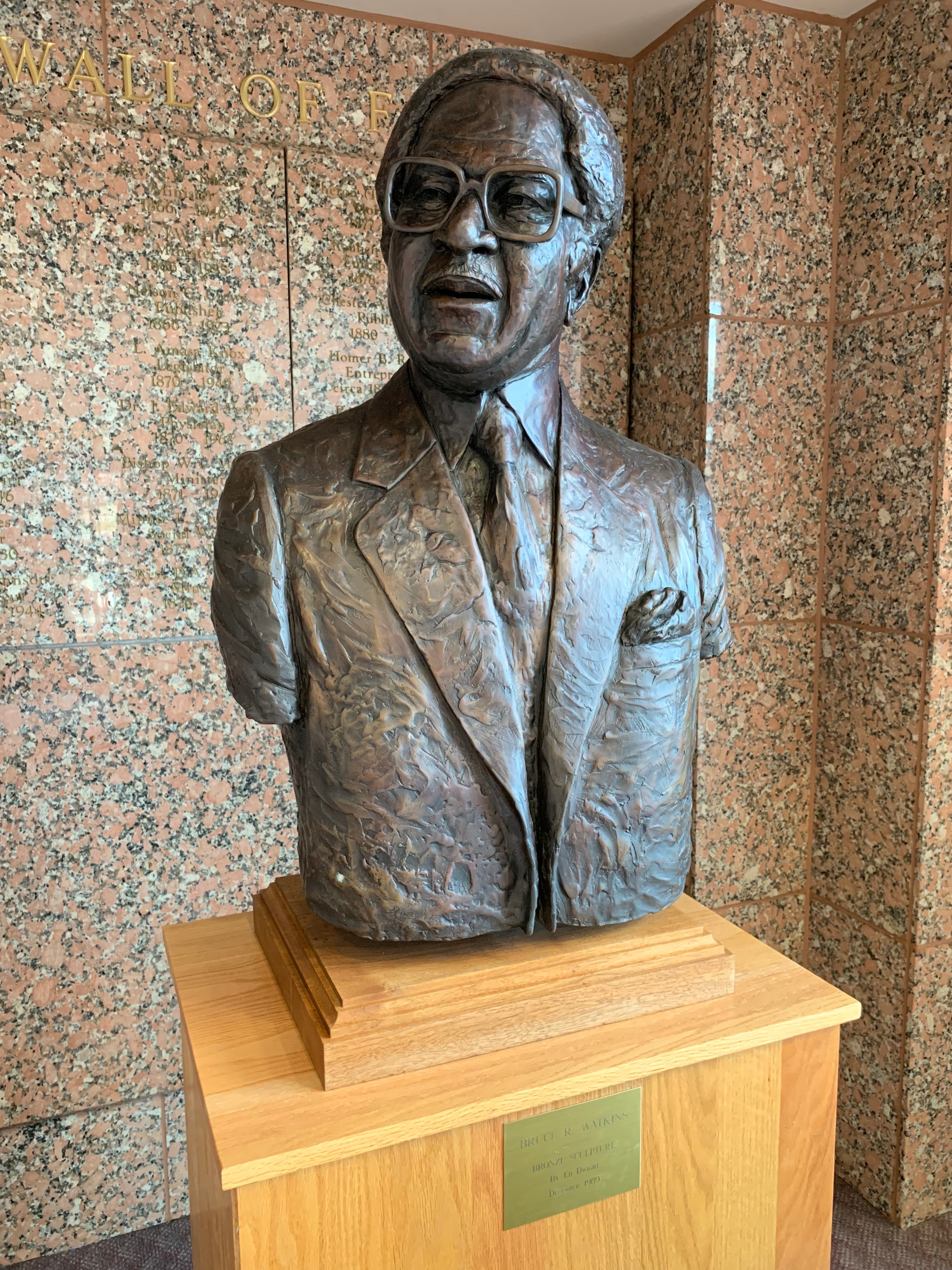
Bronze bust of Bruce R. Watkins created in December, 1989, by Ed Dwight on display at the Bruce R. Watkins Cultural Heritage Center

Bruce Riley Watkins (March 20, 1924, Parkville, Missouri - September 13, 1980 Kansas City, Missouri) and his stepfather Theron B. Watkins (1877–1950) were prominent political and social activists in Kansas City and Jackson County, Missouri. The younger Watkins was the first African-American elected to Kansas City's City Council, in 1963; the first African-American elected to office in that county's administration, in 1966; and the first African-American to nearly win election as Kansas City Mayor, in April 1979. Although initially running as a republican, like his stepfather, Bruce R. Watkins later switched his political affiliation and served as Chair of the Jackson County Democratic Committee. Watkins and his close friend Leon Jordan established the political club "Freedom, Inc." in 1962.

== Monuments ==
Monuments erected in his honor include the Spirit of Freedom fountain at Brush Creek Boulevard and Cleveland Avenue in Kansas City, Missouri and the Bruce R. Watkins Cultural Heritage Center at Blue Parkway and Cleveland Avenue and Bruce R. Watkins Drive (US 71), a major thoroughfare in Kansas City completed October 22, 2001. Both landmarks are within walking distance of the family business co-founded by Theron Watkins, Watkins Brothers Memorial Chapel.

== City Council ==
During his time on City Council, Watkins championed civil rights and equal employment opportunities. On Sept 13, 1963, he established Public Accommodations Ordinance No. 29153 which prohibited race-based discrimination in private businesses. This legislation was hotly contested and submitted to a public referendum before finally passing on April 18, 1964.

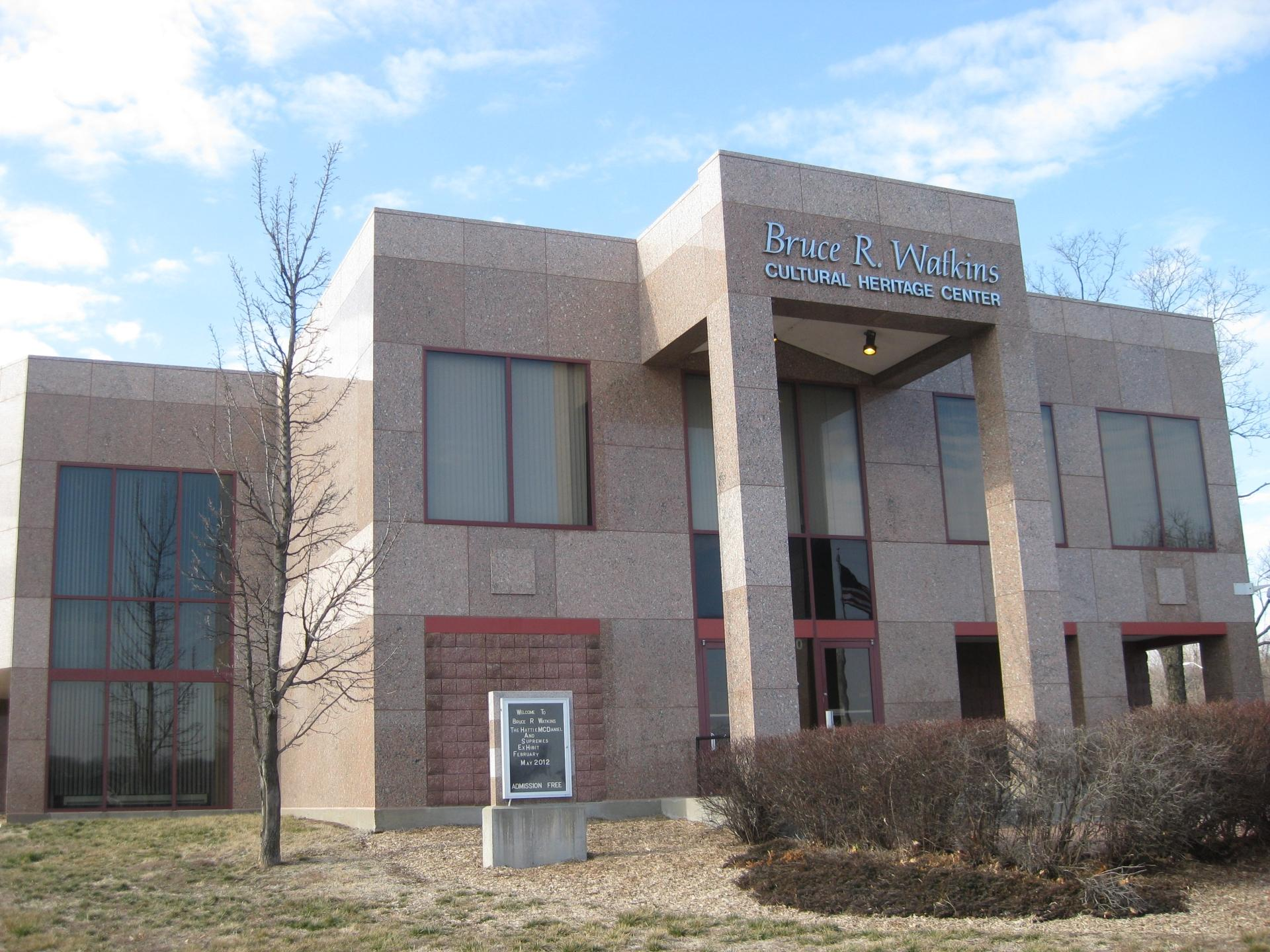
The Cultural Heritage Center, February 2012.

== Cultural Heritage Center ==
The Bruce R. Watkins Cultural Heritage Center, dedicated in December 1989, is dedicated to the legacy of Mr. Watkins. It features exhibits about the artistic, cultural and social history of the African-American experience.
