= Yvonne S. Wilson =

American politician (1929–2019)

Member of the Missouri Senate from the 9th district
- In office 2005–2010
- Preceded by: Mary Groves Bland
- Succeeded by: Kiki Curls

Member of the Missouri House of Representatives from the 42nd district
- In office 1999–2005
- Preceded by: Lloyd Daniel
- Succeeded by: Jonas Hughes

Personal details
- Born: Yvonne Delores Starks; March 22, 1929 Kansas City, Missouri, U.S.
- Died: October 14, 2019 (aged 90) Kansas City, Missouri, U.S.
- Party: Democratic
- Spouse: James Wilson (m. 1947; died 2008)
- Children: 3
- Profession: Educator

Yvonne Delores Starks Wilson (March 22, 1929 – October 14, 2019) was a Democratic politician from Missouri. She was born in Kansas City, Missouri.

== Biography ==
Wilson received a Bachelor of Arts degree from Lincoln University in elementary education in 1950 and a Master of Arts degree in sociology from University of Missouri-Kansas City in 1971. She received an honorary Doctorate of Humanities from Lincoln University in 1991. Wilson graduated from Lincoln High School, Kansas City. She served in the Kansas City, Missouri School District for 35 years as a teacher, principal of the William Rockhill Nelson Elementary School, and Director of Elementary Education (1982-1985). Wilson retired from the school district in 1985. Wilson served as a Program Director for Metropolitan Community College and as the Director of the Bruce R. Watkins Cultural Heritage Center. Wilson also served on multiple non-profit boards in Kansas City such as the City of Fountains Foundation and the Bruce R. Watkins Cultural Heritage Center and Museum Foundation. Wilson was the first Black woman to serve as the President of the Missouri Association of Elementary School Principals.

In 2001, Wilson co-authored the report "Closing the Achievement Gap: Improving Educational Outcomes for African-American Children" as a member of the National Black Caucus of State Legislators.

Wilson was first elected to the Missouri House of Representatives in a special election in 1999. She served in that body through 2002. In 2004, she was first elected to the Missouri State Senate and continued to serve until 2010. She served on the following committees:

- Appropriations
- Education
- General Laws
- Health, Mental Health, Seniors and Families
- Joint Committee on Education

In 2017, Wilson was added to the University of Missouri-Kansas City Starr Hall of Fame. In 2018, the Kansas City Board of Parks and Recreation renamed Liberty Park at E. 34th Terr. and Stadium Dr. in honor of Ms. Wilson. In 2019, Senator Wilson authored the book, "Living off Grandma's Sayings: From Leeds to the Legislature."

== Personal life ==
Wilson was Catholic.
