= Frank Mazzuca (American politician) =

American politician

Frank C. Mazzuca (July 11, 1905 – January 14, 1969) was an American politician.

From Kansas City, Missouri, Mazzuca served in the Missouri House of Representatives from 1965 until his death in 1969 and was a Democrat. Mazzuca died suddenly of a heart attack in Jefferson City, Missouri while attending the Missouri 1969 Inaugural Ceremony.
