= Kiki Curls =

American politician (born 1968)

Shalonn "Kiki" Curls

Member of the Missouri Senate from the 9th district
- In office January 2011 – January 16, 2020
- Preceded by: Yvonne S. Wilson
- Succeeded by: Barbara Washington

Member of the Missouri House of Representatives from the 41st district
- In office 2007–2011
- Preceded by: Melba J. Curls

Personal details
- Born: July 12, 1968 (age 58) Los Angeles, California
- Party: Democratic
- Children: James; Michaela
- Education: University of Missouri
- Occupation: Real estate developer

Shalonn "Kiki" Curls (born December 7, 1968) is an American politician who served as a member of the Missouri Senate. She represented the 9th district, which includes part of Jackson County, from 2011 to 2020.

== Early life and education ==
Kiki Curls was born in Los Angeles in 1968. She attended St. Teresa's Academy and graduated from the University of Missouri.

== Career ==
She currently works as a real estate developer.

=== Politics ===
In 2006, Kiki Curls ran for the 41st district of the Missouri House of Representatives. She won election unopposed and won reelection unopposed in 2008 and 2010. In 2011 State Senator Yvonne S. Wilson retired from the senate so Governor Jay Nixon made a special election to fill her seat. Curls ran for the seat with the support of Wilson. Her opponent was Republican Nola Wood. She won the election with 83 percent of the vote. She is also the 14th ward's Democratic Committeewoman in Kansas City.

==== Committee assignments ====
- Appropriations
- General Laws
- Health, Mental Health, Seniors & Families
- Joint Committee on Capital Improvements & Leases Oversight
- Joint Committee on Corrections
- Joint Committee on Tax Policy

== Electoral history ==
2012 General Election for Missouri’s 9th Senate District
Party	Candidate	Votes	%	±%
Democratic	Kiki Curls	62,964	100.0	

2011 Special Election for Missouri’s 9th Senate District
Party	Candidate	Votes	%	±%
Democratic	Kiki Curls	11,594	83.2	
Republican	Nola Wood	2,298	16.5	

2010 General Election for Missouri’s 41st District House of Representatives
Party	Candidate	Votes	%	±%
Democratic	Kiki Curls	5,002	100.0	

2008 General Election for Missouri’s 41st District House of Representatives
Party	Candidate	Votes	%	±%
Democratic	Kiki Curls	10,519	100.0	

2006 General Election for Missouri’s 41st District House of Representatives
Party	Candidate	Votes	%	±%
Democratic	Kiki Curls	5,855	100.0	

== Personal life ==
Curls attends St. Monica's Catholic Church and is the mother of twins.
