= Phil Curls =

American politician (1942–2007)

Honorable Phil Curls

Missouri House of Representatives
- In office 1972–1982

Missouri Senate
- In office 1984–1998

Personal details
- Born: April 2, 1942 Kansas City, Missouri
- Died: May 4, 2007 (aged 65)
- Party: Democratic
- Spouse: Melba Curls
- Education: Rockhurst College

Phil B. Curls, Sr. (April 2, 1942 – May 4, 2007) was an American Democratic politician. He served in the Missouri House of Representatives from 1972 to 1982, and in the Missouri Senate from 1984 to 1998.

== Early life ==
Curls was born in Kansas City, Missouri. His father helped found Freedom, Inc., the oldest African American political club in the country. He graduated from DeLaSalle High School and Rockhurst College in Kansas City.

== Career ==
Curls worked as a real estate broker and appraiser. He was a founding member of the Missouri Legislative Black Caucus Foundation. He served in the Missouri House of Representatives from 1972 to 1982, and he won a special election in 1983 to the Missouri Senate serving from 1984 to 1996.

== Death ==
He died in 2007, the same week that his wife, Melba Curls, was inaugurated as an at-large councilwoman for Kansas City. In 2017, a senior living development in Kansas City was named Curls Manor after him.
