= Freedom, Inc. =

- Formation: 1961
- Founder: Bruce Watkins; Howard Maupin; Charles Moore; Fred Curls; Leon Jordan
- Founded at: Kansas City, Missouri
- Purpose: Political organization

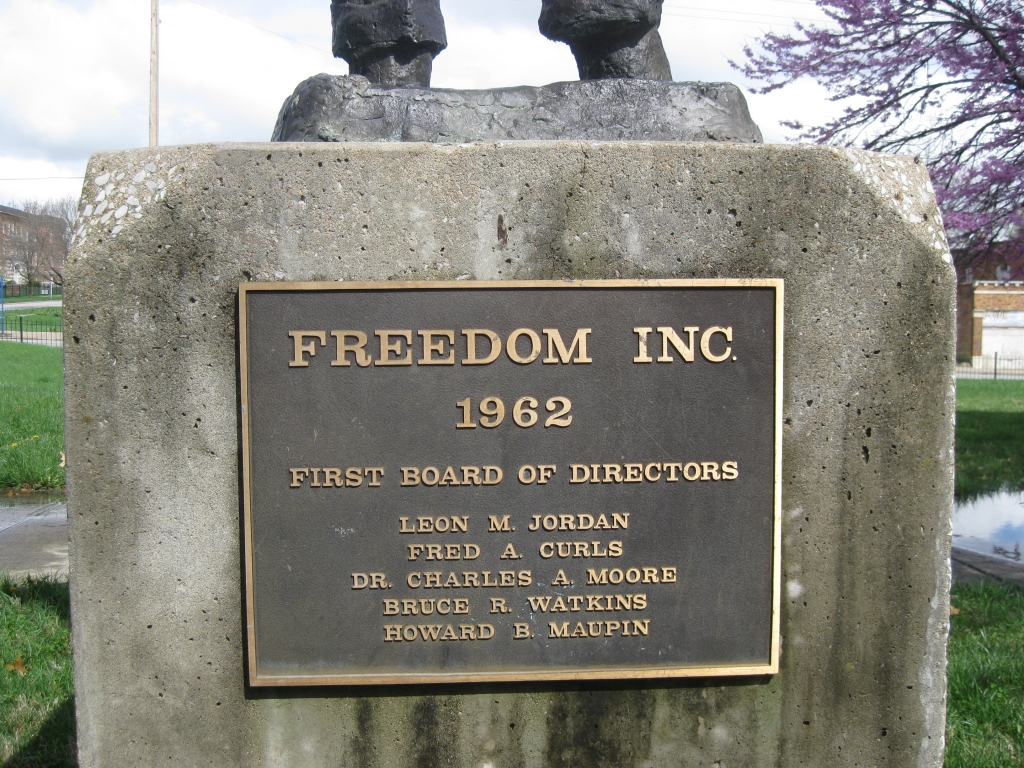
Plaque on rear of base of statue at Leon M. Jordan Memorial Park in Kansas City, Missouri

Freedom, Inc. or Freedom, Incorporated of Kansas City Missouri is a political organization founded in 1961 by five African-American political activists, Bruce Watkins, Howard Maupin, Charles Moore, Fred Curls, Leon Jordan. This was crucial to desegregation of Kansas City Missouri public facilities, the election of many black Missouri State Representatives since 1963, the "strong" candidacy of Bruce R. Watkins for Mayor of Kansas City in 1978–79, the 1982 election of Alan Wheat, the first black Congressman to represent a majority-white district in the Greater Kansas City Missouri Metropolitan Area, the 1991 election of Emanuel Cleaver as the first black mayor of Kansas City, and—according to new information reported on KKFI on February 18, 2012, during an on-air interview of filmmaker Emiel Cleaver, possibly a blueprint responsible for elections of "First Black Mayors" in New Orleans, Louisiana and other major U.S. cities. The organization was reportedly the brainchild of Leon M. Jordan and Bruce R. Watkins, who were elected its first chairman and co-chairman, respectively.
