= 2018 Missouri State Auditor election =

- November 6, 2018
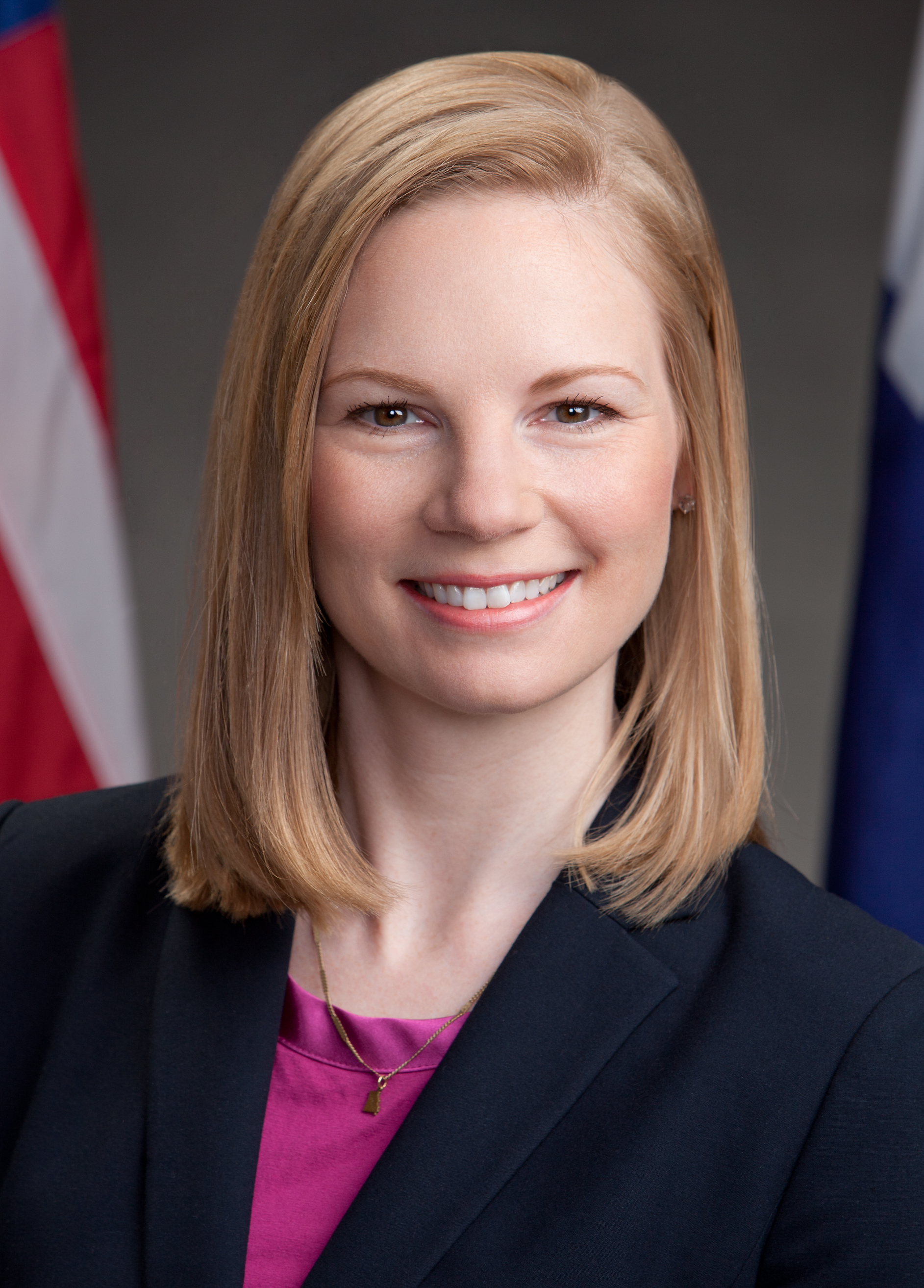

Nominee	Nicole Galloway	Saundra McDowell
Party	Democratic	Republican
Popular vote	1,209,881	1,070,701
Percentage	50.41%	44.61%
- Galloway: 40–50% 50–60% 60–70% 70–80% 80–90% >90% McDowell: 40–50% 50–60% 60–70% 70–80% 80–90% >90% Tie: 40–50% 50% No votes
State Auditor before election
Nicole Galloway
Democratic
Elected State Auditor
Nicole Galloway
Democratic

On November 6, 2018, a general election in the U.S. state of Missouri was held for the post of State Auditor of Missouri. The election for Missouri State Auditor coincided with the U.S. federal midterm elections that were held throughout all 50 states, as well with other state legislative and local races in Missouri. Missouri's Class 1 United States Senate seat was also up for election on November 6, 2018.

The primary elections for this race were held on August 7, 2018. The Democrats nominated incumbent Missouri State Auditor Nicole Galloway, while the Republicans nominated attorney Saundra McDowell.

Galloway won election to a full term. Prior to this, Galloway had been appointed to the post by former Governor Jay Nixon in 2015, following the death of Tom Schweich.

Following the Republican victories in the elections on November 8, 2016, for Governor of Missouri, U.S. Senate, Lieutenant Governor, Missouri State Treasurer, Attorney General, and Secretary of State, Galloway and U.S. Senator Claire McCaskill became the only two remaining Democratic statewide officeholders in Missouri. McCaskill's failed re-election campaign in 2018 made Galloway the state's only Democratic statewide officeholder and only female statewide elected official. Her victory also marks the only Democratic win in a statewide election in the state since 2012. As of 2026, this was the last time a Democrat won a statewide election in Missouri.

== Democratic primary ==
=== Candidates ===
==== Declared ====
- Nicole Galloway, incumbent state auditor

=== Results ===
Democratic primary results
Party	Candidate	Votes	%
Democratic	Nicole Galloway (incumbent)	515,398	100.0
Total votes		515,398	100.0

== Republican primary ==
=== Candidates ===
==== Declared ====
- Paul Curtman, state representative
- Saundra McDowell, former director of enforcement in the Missouri Securities Division
- Kevin Roach, Ballwin city alderman and accountant
- David Wasinger, attorney

=== Results ===
Republican primary results
Party	Candidate	Votes	%
Republican	Saundra McDowell	192,814	32.6
Republican	David Wasinger	158,071	26.7
Republican	Kevin Roach	143,745	24.3
Republican	Paul Curtman	97,055	16.4
Total votes		591,685	100.0

== General election ==
=== Polling ===
Poll source	Date(s) administered	Sample size	Margin of error	Nicole Galloway (D)	Saundra McDowell (R)	Other	Undecided
Remington Research Group (Note: Poll sponsored by the Missouri Scout)	November 1–2, 2018	1,424	± 2.6%	49%	38%	6% (Note: Jacob Luetkemeyer (C) with 3%, Don Fitz (G) with 2%, and Sean O'Toole (L) with 1%)	7%
Remington Research Group	October 24–25, 2018	1,376	± 2.6%	48%	38%	7% (Note: Jacob Luetkemeyer (C) with 3%, Don Fitz (G) and Sean O'Toole (L) each with 2%)	7%
Remington Research Group	October 17–18, 2018	1,215	± 2.7%	46%	42%	–	12%
Remington Research Group	September 26–27, 2018	1,555	± 2.5%	43%	44%	–	13%
Remington Research Group	August 8–9, 2018	1,785	± 2.3%	42%	47%	–	11%

=== Results ===
2018 Missouri State Auditor election
Party	Candidate	Votes	%	±%
Democratic	Nicole Galloway (incumbent)	1,209,881	50.41%	+50.41%
Republican	Saundra McDowell	1,070,701	44.61%	−28.72%
Libertarian	Sean O'Toole	51,304	2.14%	−17.58%
Constitution	Jacob Luetkemeyer	50,951	2.12%	−4.84%
Green	Don Fitz	17,106	0.72%	N/A
Independent	Arnie C. AC Dienoff (write-in)	4	0.00%	N/A
Total votes		2,399,947	100.00%	N/A
Democratic hold				

==== By congressional district ====
Despite losing the state, McDowell won five of eight congressional districts, with the remaining three going to Galloway, including one that elected a Republican.

District	Galloway	McDowell	Representative
1st	83%	14%	Lacy Clay
2nd	54%	41%	Ann Wagner
3rd	44%	49%	Blaine Luetkemeyer
4th	45%	50%	Vicky Hartzler
5th	64%	31%	Emanuel Cleaver
6th	43%	51%	Sam Graves
7th	39%	57%	Billy Long
8th	32%	64%	Jason Smith

== Notes ==
Partisan clients
