= 2010 Missouri elections =

Missouri elections, 2010
- November 2, 2010

Elections were held in Missouri on Tuesday, November 2, 2010. Primary elections were held on August 3, 2010.

== Federal ==
=== United States Senate ===
The candidates on the general election ballot are:

- Roy Blunt (Republican), U.S. Congressman
- Robin Carnahan (Democratic), Missouri Secretary of State
- Jerry Beck (Constitution)
- Jonathan Dine (Libertarian)
- Frazier Miller (Write In), perennial candidate
- Deborah Solomon (Independent)

=== United States House ===
All nine Missouri seats in the United States House of Representatives are up for election in 2010.

== State ==
=== State Auditor ===
2010 Missouri state auditor election
Party	Candidate	Votes	%	±%
Republican	Tom Schweich	974,517	50.8%	
Democratic	Susan Montee (inc.)	871,867	45.5%	
Libertarian	Charles Baum	70,816	3.7%	
Majority		102,650	5.4%	
Turnout		1,917,200	46.3%	
Republican gain from Democratic		Swing		

=== State Senate ===
Half of the seats of the Missouri Senate were up for election in 2010.

Missouri Senate elections, 2010
Party	Votes	Percentage	Not up	Contested	Before	After	+/–
Republican	585,705	62.36%	13	10	23	26	▲3
Democratic	311,264	33.14%	4	7	11	8	▼3
Libertarian	23,559	2.51%	0	0	0	0	Steady
Constitution	12,201	1.30%	0	0	0	0	Steady
Independent	6,512	0.69%	0	0	0	0	Steady
Totals	939,235	100.00%	17	17	34	34	—

=== State House of Representatives ===
All of the seats in the Missouri House of Representatives were up for election in 2010.

Missouri House of Representatives elections, 2010
Party	Votes	Percentage	Before	After	+/–
Republican	1,075,925	59.28%	89	105	▲16
Democratic	707,428	38.98%	74	58	▼16
Libertarian	10,483	0.58%	0	0	Steady
Constitution	12,414	0.68%	0	0	Steady
Independent /Write-In	8,165	0.48%	0	0	Steady
Totals	1,815,013	-	163	163	—

=== Judicial positions ===
Multiple judicial positions were up for election in 2010.

- Missouri judicial elections, 2010 at Judgepedia

=== Ballot measures ===
Six ballot measures were certified for the 2010 statewide ballot. One of them was approved on the August 3, 2010 ballot, and the remaining five were on the November 2, 2010 ballot.

- Missouri 2010 ballot measures at Ballotpedia

Amendment B results by county Yes: 70–80%; 60–70%; 50–60%; No: 90–100%; 80–90%; 70–80%; 60–70%; 50–60%

== Local ==
Many elections for county offices will also be held on November 2, 2010.
