= 2010 Missouri Senate election =

Missouri State Senate elections, 2010
- November 2, 2010

17 even-numbered districts in the Missouri Senate 18 seats needed for a majority
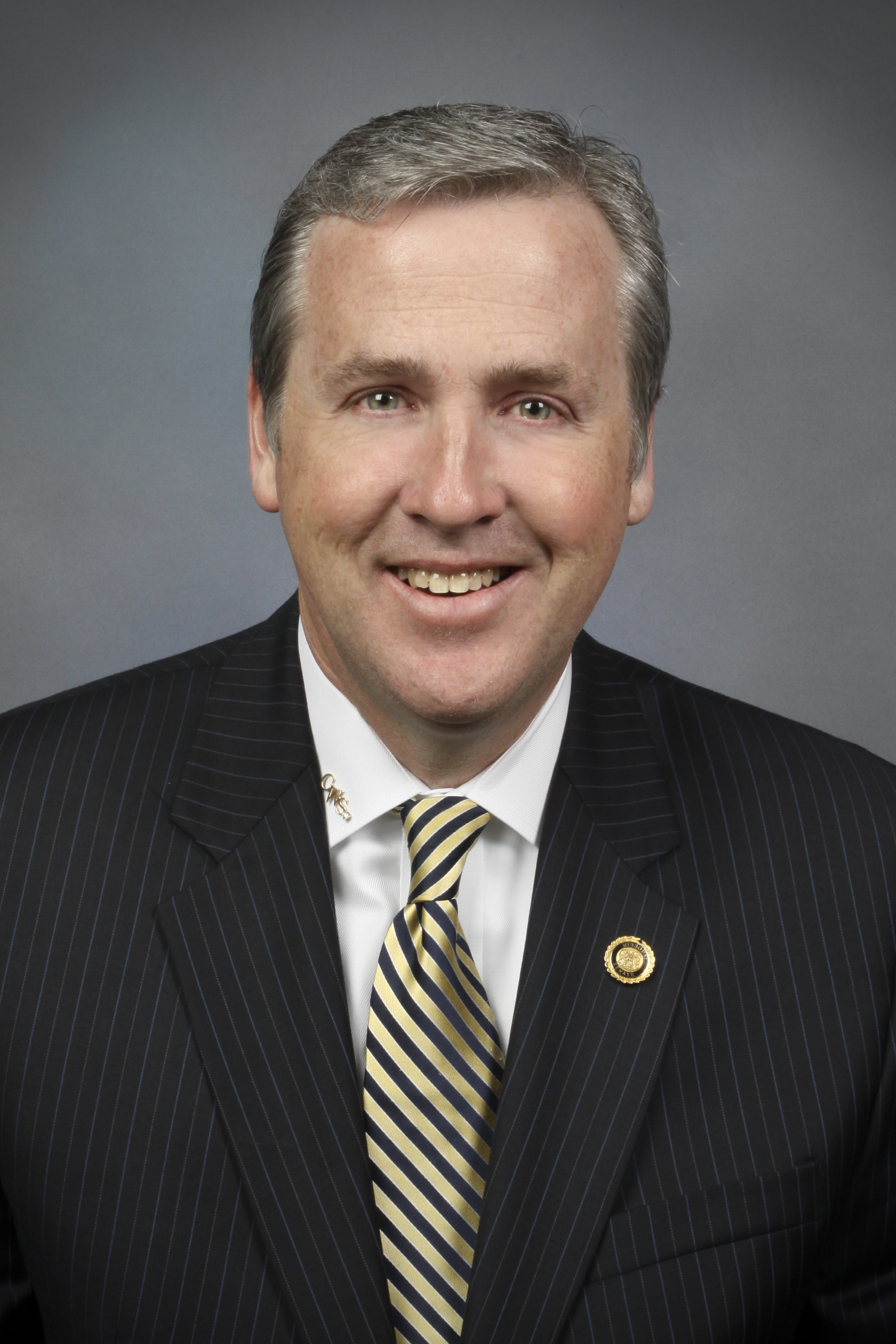

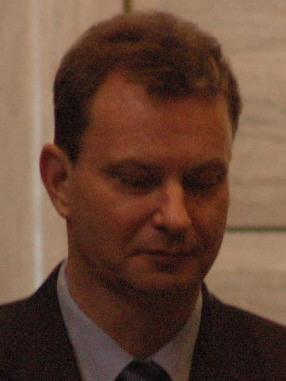
	Majority party	Minority party
Leader	Charles W. Shields (retired)	Victor Callahan
Party	Republican	Democratic
Leader's seat	34th-St. Joseph	11th-Independence
Seats before	23	11
Seats after	26	8
Seat change	▲3	▼3
Popular vote	585,705	311,264
Percentage	62.36%	33.14%
- Results: Republican gain Democratic hold Republican hold No election
Pro Tem before election
Charles W. Shields
Republican
Pro Tem-designate
Rob Mayer
Republican

The 2010 Missouri Senate elections were held on November 2, 2010. Voters in the 17 even-numbered districts of the Missouri Senate voted for their representatives. Other elections were also held on November 2. The Missouri Republican Party gained three seats and maintained control of the Missouri Senate.

== Overview ==
Missouri Senate elections, 2010
Party	Votes	Percentage	Not up	Contested	Before	After	+/–
Republican	585,705	62.36%	13	10	23	26	▲
Democratic	311,264	33.14%	4	7	11	8	▼
Libertarian	23,559	2.51%	0	0	0	0	Steady
Constitution	12,201	1.30%	0	0	0	0	Steady
Independent	6,512	0.69%	0	0	0	0	Steady
Totals	939,235	100.00%	17	17	34	34	—

== Predictions ==
Source	Ranking	As of
Governing	Safe R	November 1, 2010

== Results ==
=== District 2 ===
Missouri's 2nd Senate district election, 2010
Party	Candidate	Votes	%
Republican	Scott Rupp (incumbent)	57,542	71.2
Democratic	Don Crozier	23,331	28.8
Total votes		80,873	100.0
Republican hold			

=== District 4 ===
Missouri's 4th Senate district election, 2010
Party	Candidate	Votes	%
Democratic	Joe Keaveny (incumbent)	35,663	84.6
Independent	Nick P. Gartelos	6,512	15.4
Total votes		42,175	100.0
Democratic hold			

=== District 6 ===
Missouri's 6th Senate district election, 2010
Party	Candidate	Votes	%
Republican	Mike Kehoe	52,402	100.0
Total votes		52,402	100.0
Republican hold			

=== District 8 ===
Missouri's 8th Senate district election, 2010
Party	Candidate	Votes	%
Republican	Will Kraus	50,615	79.4
Libertarian	Kevin Parr	13,157	20.6
Total votes		63,772	100.0
Republican hold			

=== District 10 ===
Missouri's 10th Senate district election, 2010
Party	Candidate	Votes	%
Democratic	Jolie Justus (incumbent)	33,634	76.4
Libertarian	Bob Ludlow	10,402	23.6
Total votes		44,036	100.0
Democratic hold			

=== District 12 ===
Missouri's 12th Senate district election, 2010
Party	Candidate	Votes	%
Republican	Brad Lager (incumbent)	46,748	100.0
Total votes		46,748	100.0
Republican hold			

=== District 14 ===
Missouri's 14th Senate district election, 2010
Party	Candidate	Votes	%
Democratic	Maria Chappelle-Nadal	38,197	100.0
Total votes		38,197	100.0
Democratic hold			

=== District 16 ===
Missouri's 16th Senate district election, 2010
Party	Candidate	Votes	%
Republican	Dan Brown	31,792	58.3
Democratic	Frank Barnitz (incumbent)	22,760	41.7
Total votes		54,552	100.0
Republican gain from Democratic			

=== District 18 ===
Missouri's 18th Senate district election, 2010
Party	Candidate	Votes	%
Republican	Brian Munzlinger	30,532	58.3
Democratic	Wes Shoemyer (incumbent)	21,813	41.7
Total votes		52,345	100.0
Republican gain from Democratic			

=== District 20 ===
Missouri's 20th Senate district election, 2010
Party	Candidate	Votes	%
Republican	Jay Wasson	60,614	77.9
Democratic	Terry Traw	17,175	22.1
Total votes		77,789	100.0
Republican hold			

=== District 22 ===
Missouri's 22nd Senate district election, 2010
Party	Candidate	Votes	%
Democratic	Ryan McKenna (incumbent)	27,380	52.6
Republican	Greg Zotta	24,701	47.4
Total votes		52,081	100.0
Democratic hold			

=== District 24 ===
Missouri's 24th Senate district election, 2010
Party	Candidate	Votes	%
Republican	John Lamping	30,619	50.1
Democratic	Barbra Fraser	30,493	49.9
Total votes		61,112	100.0
Republican gain from Democratic			

=== District 26 ===
Missouri's 26th Senate district election, 2010
Party	Candidate	Votes	%
Republican	Brian Nieves	42,112	65.6
Democratic	George "Boots" Webber	19,063	29.7
Constitution	Richard E. Newton	2,988	4.7
Total votes		64,163	100.0
Republican hold			

=== District 28 ===
Missouri's 28th Senate district election, 2010
Party	Candidate	Votes	%
Republican	Mike Parson	47,380	83.7
Constitution	Bennie B. Hatfield	9,213	16.3
Total votes		56,593	100.0
Republican hold			

=== District 30 ===
Missouri's 30th Senate district election, 2010
Party	Candidate	Votes	%
Republican	Bob Dixon	33,715	64.9
Democratic	Michael Hoeman	18,272	35.1
Total votes		51,987	100.0
Republican hold			

=== District 32 ===
Missouri's 32nd Senate district election, 2010
Party	Candidate	Votes	%
Republican	Ron Richard	45,190	100.0
Total votes		45,190	100.0
Republican hold			

=== District 34 ===
Missouri's 34th Senate district election, 2010
Party	Candidate	Votes	%
Republican	Rob Schaaf	31,743	57.5
Democratic	Martin T. Rucker	23,483	42.5
Total votes		55,226	100.0
Republican hold			

== See also ==
- United States Senate election in Missouri, 2010
- Missouri state auditor election, 2010
