= Allen Icet =

American politician

Collector of Revenue for Greene County
- Incumbent
- Assumed office March 1, 2021
- Appointed by: Mike Parson
- Preceded by: Leah Betts

Member of the Missouri House of Representatives from the 84th District
- In office 2002–2010
- Preceded by: Joan Bray
- Succeeded by: Don Gosen

Personal details
- Born: March 31, 1957 (age 69) Houston, Texas
- Party: Republican
- Children: 4
- Education: Texas A&M University (B.S.); Washington University in St. Louis (M.B.A.)

Allen Icet (born March 31, 1957) is a Republican politician. He served in the Missouri House of Representatives from 2002 to 2010 and as Chairman of the House Budget Committee from 2005 to 2010. Icet was appointed Greene County Collector on March 1, 2021, and elected to a four-year term beginning January 1, 2023.

== Early life and education ==
Icet was born March 31, 1957, in Houston, Texas.

In 1980, Icet received a Bachelor of Science from Texas A&M University in Civil Engineering. He also received a Master of Business Administration from the Olin Business School at Washington University in St. Louis.

== Career ==
Icet is a past president (1995–96) and director (1994–96) of the Rockwood Board of Education for Saint Louis County's largest public school system. He was on the Rockwood School District Advisory Council, which serves more than 22,000 students. In 2000, Icet served as a delegate to the Missouri Republican Convention. He also served on Minority Leader Catherine Hanaway's 2001 Blue Ribbon Budget Committee.

Icet became a delegate of the Missouri Republican Convention in 2000 and served as a Member of the former House Minority Leader Catherine Hanaway's 2001 Blue Ribbon Commission, recommending steps towards realistic budgeting. In 2002, he was elected to the Missouri House of Representatives, succeeding Democratic incumbent Joan Bray. During his tenure in the House he served on six different committees. In 2005, after a year as Vice-Chair, he began serving as Chairman of the House Budget Committee.

In 2007, Icet was nominated as a successor to then-Speaker of the House Rod Jetton. Fellow Republican Ron Richard ultimately won the nomination and subsequent speakership, and Icet remained in his position in the Budget Committee.

Icet left the House of Representatives in 2010, after eight years in office, the longest term allowed. He was succeeded by fellow Republican Don Gosen, who ran unopposed in the 2010 election.

In June 2009, Icet announced his intentions to run for State Auditor of Missouri in the 2010 election. On July 7, Republican Tom Schweich announced his 2010 candidacy for the same position, forcing a Republican primary. Also on July 7, 2009, Icet announced endorsements from 80 Missouri Representatives and two state Senators.

As of 2009, Icet is a consultant for energy company ConocoPhillips on capital expansion projects.

Icet was appointed as Greene County Collector by Governor Mike Parson on March 1, 2021, to fulfill the remainder of previous Collector Leah Betts' term, after she tendered a resignation. This partial, three-year term ended on March 1, 2023.

== Personal life ==
Icet resides in Wildwood, Missouri, with his wife, Carol. They have four children: Sarah, Melissa, Alexandra and Daniel. Icet attends Ballwin Baptist Church, and formerly served on the board of directors for Ballwin Christian Academy.

== Electoral history ==
Icet has won four elections to the Missouri House of Representatives. In three elections, the seat was uncontested.

Election	Political result	Candidate	Party	Votes	%
2002 election Results for district 84	Republican gain from Democratic	Allen Icet	Republican	10,918	76.5
2002 election Results for district 84	Republican gain from Democratic	Stella Ann Madison	Democratic	3,122	21.9
2002 election Results for district 84	Republican gain from Democratic	Anthony S. Gianino	Libertarian	235	1.6
2004 election Results for district 84	Republican hold	Allen Icet	Republican	unopposed	
2006 election Results for district 84	Republican hold	Allen Icet	Republican	unopposed	
2008 election Results for district 84	Republican hold	Allen Icet	Republican	unopposed	

2010 State Auditor election
Primary election
Party	Candidate	Votes	%
Republican	Tom Schweich	315,658	58.6
Republican	Allen Icet	222,889	41.4
Total votes		538,547	100.00
