= 1954 Missouri State Auditor election =

- November 2, 1954

Nominee	Haskell Holman	Harold L. Butterfield
Party	Democratic	Republican
Popular vote	659,141	526,723
Percentage	55.58%	44.42%
State Auditor before election
Haskell Holman (Acting)
Democratic
Elected State Auditor
Haskell Holman
Democratic

The 1954 Missouri State Auditor election was held on November 2, 1954, in order to elect the state auditor of Missouri. Democratic nominee and incumbent acting state auditor Haskell Holman defeated Republican nominee Harold L. Butterfield.

== General election ==
On election day, November 2, 1954, Democratic nominee Haskell Holman won the election by a margin of 132,418 votes against his opponent Republican nominee Harold L. Butterfield, thereby retaining Democratic control over the office of state auditor. Holman was sworn in for his first full term on January 10, 1955.

=== Results ===
Missouri State Auditor election, 1954
Party	Candidate	Votes	%
Democratic	Haskell Holman (incumbent)	659,141	55.58
Republican	Harold L. Butterfield	526,723	44.42
Total votes		1,185,864	100.00
Democratic hold			
