= Senator Shields =

Senator Shields may refer to:

== Members of the United States Senate ==
- James Shields (politician, born 1806) (1806–1879), U.S. Senator from Illinois from 1849 to 1855; from Minnesota from 1858 to 1859; and from Missouri in 1879
- John K. Shields (1858–1934), U.S. Senator from Tennessee from 1913 to 1925

== United States state senate members ==
- Charles W. Shields (born 1959), Missouri State Senate
- Frank Shields (politician) (born 1945), Oregon State Senate
