= 1966 Missouri State Auditor election =

- November 8, 1966

Nominee	Haskell Holman	William T. Zimmerman
Party	Democratic	Republican
Popular vote	559,468	472,015
Percentage	54.24%	45.76%
State Auditor before election
Haskell Holman
Democratic
Elected State Auditor
Haskell Holman
Democratic

The 1966 Missouri State Auditor election was held on November 8, 1966, in order to elect the state auditor of Missouri. Democratic nominee and incumbent state auditor Haskell Holman defeated Republican nominee William T. Zimmerman.

== General election ==
On election day, November 8, 1966, Democratic nominee Haskell Holman won re-election by a margin of 87,453 votes against his opponent Republican nominee William T. Zimmerman, thereby retaining Democratic control over the office of state auditor. Holman was sworn in for his fourth term on January 9, 1967.

=== Results ===
Missouri State Auditor election, 1966
Party	Candidate	Votes	%
Democratic	Haskell Holman (incumbent)	559,468	54.24
Republican	William T. Zimmerman	472,015	45.76
Total votes		1,031,483	100.00
Democratic hold			
