= 2006 Missouri State Auditor election =

- November 7, 2006
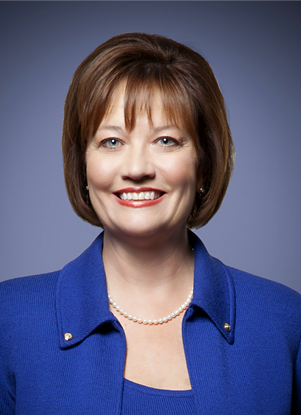

Nominee	Susan Montee	Sandra Thomas
Party	Democratic	Republican
Popular vote	1,084,793	888,012
Percentage	52.91%	43.31%
- County results Montee: 30–40% 40–50% 50–60% 60–70% 70–80% Thomas: 40–50% 50–60% 60–70%
State Auditor before election
Claire McCaskill
Democratic
Elected State Auditor
Susan Montee
Democratic

The 2006 Missouri State Auditor election was held on November 7, 2006, in order to elect the state auditor of Missouri. Democratic nominee Susan Montee defeated Republican nominee Sandra Thomas, Libertarian nominee Charles Baum and Progressive nominee Terry Bunker.

== General election ==
On election day, November 7, 2006, Democratic nominee Susan Montee won the election by a margin of 196,781 votes against her foremost opponent Republican nominee Sandra Thomas, thereby retaining Democratic control over the office of state auditor. Montee was sworn in as the 35th state auditor of Missouri on January 3, 2007.

=== Results ===
Missouri State Auditor election, 2006
Party	Candidate	Votes	%
Democratic	Susan Montee	1,084,793	52.91
Republican	Sandra Thomas	888,012	43.31
Libertarian	Charles Baum	56,883	2.78
Progressive	Terry Bunker	20,503	1.00
Total votes		2,050,191	100.00
Democratic hold			
