= 2018 United States Senate election in Missouri =

- November 6, 2018
- Turnout: 58.2% ▼
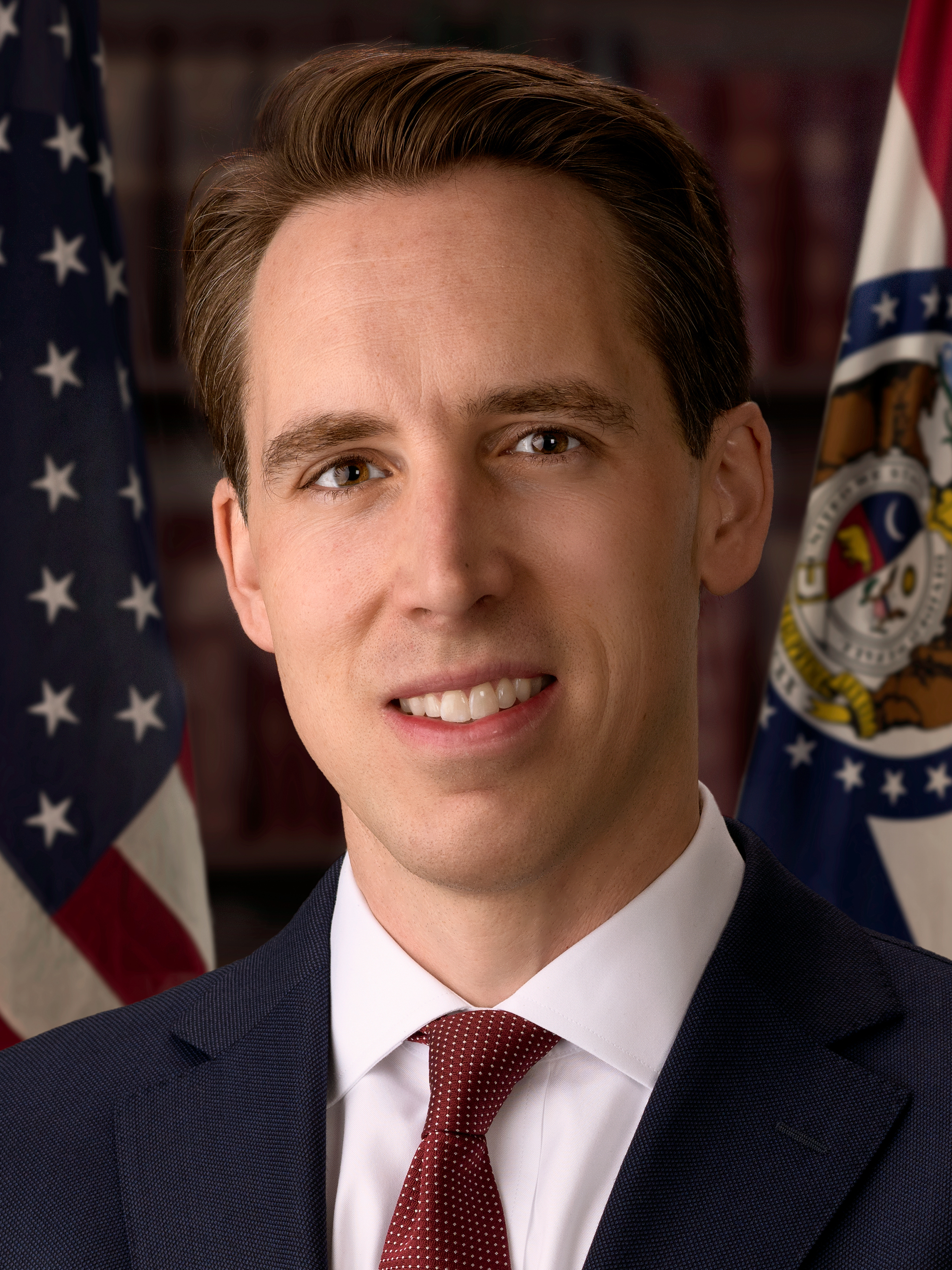

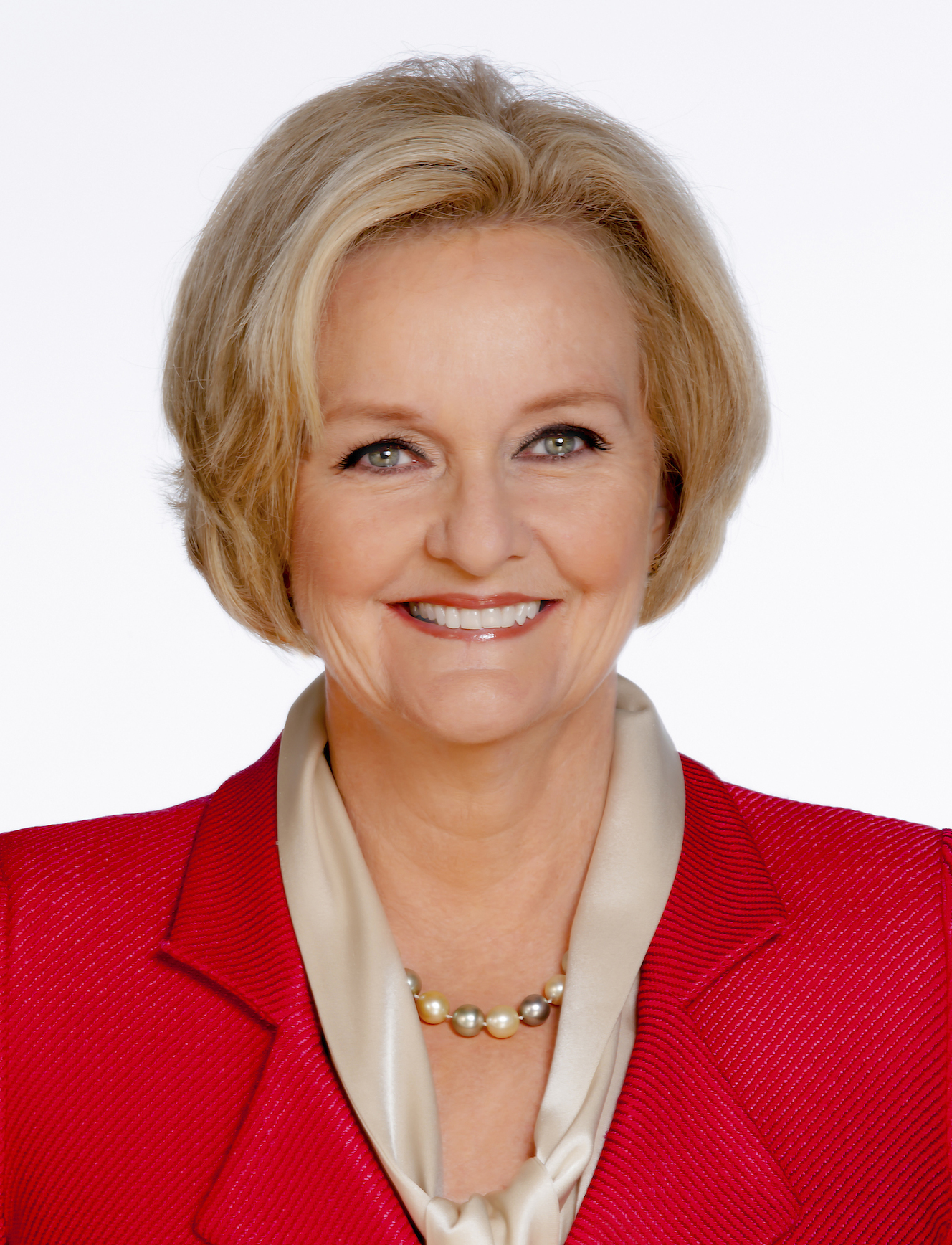
Nominee	Josh Hawley	Claire McCaskill
Party	Republican	Democratic
Popular vote	1,254,927	1,112,935
Percentage	51.38%	45.57%
- Hawley: 40–50% 50–60% 60–70% 70–80% 80–90% >90% McCaskill: 40–50% 50–60% 60–70% 70–80% 80–90% >90% Tie: 40–50% 50% No votes
U.S. senator before election
Claire McCaskill
Democratic
Elected U.S. Senator
Josh Hawley
Republican

The 2018 United States Senate election in Missouri took place on November 6, 2018, to elect a member of the United States Senate to represent the State of Missouri, concurrently with other elections to the United States Senate, elections to the United States House of Representatives, and various state and local elections, including Missouri's quadrennial State Auditor election.

This was one of ten Democratic-held Senate seats up for election in a state Donald Trump won in the 2016 presidential election. Incumbent Democratic Senator Claire McCaskill ran for re-election to a third term. McCaskill easily won her party's nomination, defeating several minor candidates in the primary, while Missouri Attorney General Josh Hawley comfortably won the Republican primary.

The candidate filing deadline was March 27, 2018, and the primary election was held on August 7, 2018. Pollsters predicted a tight race; however, Hawley defeated McCaskill on election day by 5.8%, taking 51.4% of the vote to McCaskill's 45.6%, a somewhat larger margin than expected. This resulted in Republicans holding both Senate seats in Missouri for the first time since McCaskill took office in 2007. Hawley was also the youngest incumbent senator at that time, and continued to be until the inauguration of Jon Ossoff in 2021. Despite her loss, McCaskill outperformed Hillary Clinton's performance in the state in the 2016 presidential race. This is the last U.S. Senate race in Missouri where the incumbent was defeated.

== Democratic primary ==
=== Candidates ===
==== Nominated ====
- Claire McCaskill, incumbent U.S. Senator

==== Eliminated in primary ====
- Angelica Earl, former insurance verification specialist
- David Faust
- Travis Gonzalez, perennial candidate
- John Hogan, perennial candidate
- Leonard Steinman, perennial candidate
- Carla (Coffee) Wright

=== Endorsements ===
Claire McCaskill

U.S. executive branch officials

- Barack Obama, 44th president of the United States

U.S. senators

- Catherine Cortez Masto, U.S. senator (NV)
- Dick Durbin, U.S. senator (IL) and Senate Minority Whip
- Kamala Harris, U.S. senator (CA)
- Maggie Hassan, U.S. senator (NH)
- Elizabeth Warren, U.S. senator (MA)

State officials

- Jason Kander, former Missouri Secretary of State, founder of Let America Vote and host of Majority 54

=== Results ===
Results by county: McCaskill: 80–90%; 70–80%; 60–70%; 50–60%

Democratic primary results
Party	Candidate	Votes	%
Democratic	Claire McCaskill (incumbent)	501,872	82.60%
Democratic	Carla Wright	41,126	6.77%
Democratic	John Hogan	15,984	2.63%
Democratic	David Faust	15,958	2.63%
Democratic	Angelica Earl	15,500	2.55%
Democratic	Travis Gonzalez	9,480	1.56%
Democratic	Leonard Steinman	7,657	1.26%
Total votes		607,577	100.00%

== Republican primary ==
=== Candidates ===
==== Nominated ====
- Josh Hawley, Missouri Attorney General

==== Eliminated in primary ====
- Brian Hagg
- Bradley Krembs
- Tony Monetti, retired bomber pilot and assistant dean of aviation at University of Central Missouri
- Kristi Nichols, activist and candidate for the U.S. Senate in 2010 and 2016
- Ken Patterson, candidate for St. Louis County Executive in 2010
- Austin Petersen, businessman and Libertarian candidate for presidential nomination in 2016
- Peter Pfeifer
- Fred Ryman, Constitution nominee for the U.S. Senate in 2016
- Christina Smith
- Courtland Sykes, veteran and former congressional aide

==== Withdrew ====
- Camille Lombardi-Olive, Democratic candidate for MO-07 in 2016

==== Declined ====
- Paul Curtman, state representative
- Eric Greitens, former Governor of Missouri
- Marsha Haefner, state representative
- Vicky Hartzler, U.S. representative
- Aaron Hedlund, economics professor
- Ed Martin, former chairman of the Missouri Republican Party, nominee for MO-03 in 2010 and nominee for attorney general in 2012
- Todd Richardson, Speaker of the Missouri House of Representatives
- Eric Schmitt, state treasurer
- Ann Wagner, U.S. representative and former U.S. Ambassador to Luxembourg
- David Wasinger, attorney

=== Endorsements ===
Josh Hawley

U.S. executive branch officials

- John Ashcroft, former United States Attorney General and former senator from Missouri
- George W. Bush, 43rd president of the United States
- Mike Pence, vice president of the United States

U.S. senators

- Kit Bond, former senator from Missouri
- John Danforth, former senator from Missouri and United States Ambassador to the United Nations
- Mitch McConnell, senator from Kentucky and Senate Majority Leader
- Jim Talent, former senator from Missouri

U.S. representatives

- Billy Long, U.S. representative (MO-7)
- Jason Smith, U.S. representative (MO-08)

State officials

- Mike Parson, governor of Missouri
- Eric Schmitt, treasurer of Missouri

Cabinet-level officials

- Steve Bannon, former White House Chief Strategist and executive chair of Breitbart News

Organizations

- Club for Growth
- Missouri Right to Life
Austin Petersen

Individuals

- Dana Loesch, conservative talk radio host and NRA spokesperson
- Ryan Wrecker, radio host on KMOV, CBS St. Louis

Organizations

- 71 Republic
Courtland Sykes

State judges

- Roy Moore, former Chief Justice of the Alabama Supreme Court

=== Debates ===
Host network	Date	Link(s)	Participants					
Host network	Date	Link(s)	Josh Hawley	Austin Petersen	Courtland Sykes	Tony Monetti	Peter Pfeifer	Kirsti Nichols
America First Missouri	May 11, 2018		Absent	Present	Present	Present	Present	Present

=== Polling ===
Poll source	Date(s) administered	Sample size	Margin of error	Josh Hawley	Austin Petersen	Courtland Sykes	Other	Undecided
Emerson College	April 26–29, 2018	283	± 6.0%	37%	8%	6%	5%	45%

Hypothetical polling

Poll source	Date(s) administered	Sample size	Margin of error	Josh Hawley	David Steelman	Ann Wagner	David Wasinger	Undecided
Remington Research Group	April 28–29, 2017	915	± 3.1%	30%	7%	14%	2%	47%
Remington Research Group	April 28–29, 2017	915	± 3.1%	37%	–	16%	–	47%

=== Results ===
Results by county: Hawley: 60–70%; 50–60%; 40–50%; Monetti: 40–50%

Republican primary results
Party	Candidate	Votes	%
Republican	Josh Hawley	389,878	58.64%
Republican	Tony Monetti	64,834	9.75%
Republican	Austin Petersen	54,916	8.26%
Republican	Kristi Nichols	49,640	7.47%
Republican	Christina Smith	35,024	5.27%
Republican	Ken Patterson	19,579	2.95%
Republican	Peter Pfeifer	16,594	2.50%
Republican	Courtland Sykes	13,870	2.09%
Republican	Fred Ryman	8,781	1.32%
Republican	Brian Hagg	6,871	1.03%
Republican	Bradley Krembs	4,902	0.74%
Total votes		664,889	100.00%

== Libertarian primary ==
=== Candidates ===
==== Nominated ====
- Japheth Campbell, entrepreneur

==== Withdrew ====
- Don Donald
- Dennis Lagares

==== Declined ====
- Alicia Dearn, attorney and candidate for vice president of the United States in 2016
- Austin Petersen, Libertarian candidate for president of the United States in 2016 (running as a Republican)

=== Results ===
Results by county: Campbell: 100%; No votes: No votes

Libertarian primary results
Party	Candidate	Votes	%
Libertarian	Japheth Campbell	5,380	100.00%
Total votes		5,380	100.00%

== Green primary ==
=== Candidates ===
==== Nominated ====
- Jo Crain

==== Eliminated in primary ====
- Jerome Bauer

=== Results ===
Results by county: Crain: 100%; 80–90%; 70–80%; 60–70%; 50–60%; Crain/Bauer tie: 50%; Bauer: 50–60%; 60–70%; 70–80%; 80–90%; 100%; No votes: No votes

Green primary results
Party	Candidate	Votes	%
Green	Jo Crain	906	57.67%
Green	Jerome Bauer	665	42.33%
Total votes		1,571	100.00%

== Independents ==
=== Candidates ===
==== Declared ====
- Craig O'Dear, attorney

== General election ==
=== Predictions ===
Source	Ranking	As of
The Cook Political Report	Tossup	October 26, 2018
Inside Elections	Tilt R (flip)	November 1, 2018
Sabato's Crystal Ball	Lean R (flip)	November 5, 2018
CNN	Tossup	November 5, 2018
RealClearPolitics	Tossup	November 5, 2018
Daily Kos	Tossup	November 5, 2018
Fox News	Tossup	November 5, 2018
FiveThirtyEight	Tossup	November 5, 2018

=== Debates ===
- Complete video of debate, October 18, 2018

=== Fundraising ===
Campaign finance reports as of October 17, 2018
Candidate	Total receipts	Total disbursements	Cash on hand
Claire McCaskill (D)	$35,361,401	$33,594,412	$1,789,381
Josh Hawley (R)	$10,221,143	$7,376,209	$2,844,933
Source: Federal Election Commission

=== Polling ===
Poll source	Date(s) administered	Sample size	Margin of error	Claire McCaskill (D)	Josh Hawley (R)	Japheth Campbell (L)	Craig O'Dear (I)	Jo Crain (G)	Other	Undecided
HarrisX	November 3–5, 2018	600	± 4.0%	45%	46%	–	–	–	–	–
HarrisX	November 2–4, 2018	600	± 4.0%	44%	47%	–	–	–	–	–
Trafalgar Group (R)	October 29 – November 4, 2018	1,791	± 2.3%	44%	48%	–	–	–	4%	3%
Emerson College	November 1–3, 2018	732	± 3.8%	46%	49%	–	–	–	3%	3%
HarrisX	November 1–3, 2018	600	± 4.0%	46%	46%	–	–	–	–	–
Missouri Scout/Remington (R)	November 1–2, 2018	1,424	± 2.6%	47%	47%	1%	1%	1%	–	3%
HarrisX	October 31 – November 2, 2018	600	± 4.0%	45%	46%	–	–	–	–	–
NBC News/Marist	October 30 – November 1, 2018	600 LV	± 5.2%	47%	44%	3%	–	2%	<1%	4%
NBC News/Marist	October 30 – November 1, 2018	600 LV	± 5.2%	50%	47%	–	–	–	<1%	3%
NBC News/Marist	October 30 – November 1, 2018	920 RV	± 4.1%	46%	43%	3%	–	2%	1%	6%
NBC News/Marist	October 30 – November 1, 2018	920 RV	± 4.1%	50%	46%	–	–	–	1%	4%
HarrisX	October 30 – November 1, 2018	600	± 4.0%	46%	43%	–	–	–	–	–
HarrisX	October 29–31, 2018	600	± 4.0%	45%	43%	–	–	–	–	–
HarrisX	October 24–30, 2018	1,400	± 2.6%	46%	44%	–	–	–	–	–
Fox News	October 27–30, 2018	741 LV	± 3.5%	43%	43%	0%	3%	1%	0%	9%
Fox News	October 27–30, 2018	741 LV	± 3.5%	45%	45%	–	–	–	2%	8%
Fox News	October 27–30, 2018	851 RV	± 3.0%	41%	42%	1%	3%	2%	1%	10%
Fox News	October 27–30, 2018	851 RV	± 3.0%	43%	44%	–	–	–	3%	9%
Cygnal (R)	October 26–27, 2018	501	± 4.4%	46%	49%	–	–	–	1%	3%
Missouri Scout/Remington (R)	October 24–25, 2018	1,376	± 2.6%	45%	49%	1%	1%	1%	–	3%
Missouri Scout/Remington (R)	October 17–18, 2018	1,215	± 2.7%	46%	47%	2%	1%	1%	–	2%
OnMessage Inc. (R-Hawley)	October 16–18, 2018	800	± 3.5%	42%	49%	–	–	–	4%	5%
The Polling Company (R-Citizens United)	October 11–13, 2018	600	± 4.0%	47%	50%	–	–	–	0%	3%
Ipsos	September 27 – October 7, 2018	1,111	± 3.0%	44%	45%	1%	2%	0%	2%	6%
1st Tuesday Campaigns	October 5–6, 2018	1,052	± 3.0%	42%	44%	1%	1%	1%	–	11%
Fox News	September 29 – October 2, 2018	683 LV	± 3.5%	43%	43%	2%	4%	1%	1%	6%
Fox News	September 29 – October 2, 2018	683 LV	± 3.5%	46%	46%	–	–	–	3%	5%
Fox News	September 29 – October 2, 2018	805 RV	± 3.5%	41%	41%	2%	4%	2%	1%	9%
Fox News	September 29 – October 2, 2018	805 RV	± 3.5%	44%	44%	–	–	–	3%	8%
McLaughlin (R-Missouri Rising Action)	September 29 – October 2, 2018	600	± 4.0%	44%	52%	–	–	–	–	–
Vox Populi Polling	September 29 – October 1, 2018	869	± 3.3%	49%	51%	–	–	–	–	–
CNN/SSRS	September 25–29, 2018	756 LV	± 4.3%	47%	44%	3%	–	1%	0%	4%
CNN/SSRS	September 25–29, 2018	906 RV	± 3.9%	43%	42%	4%	–	2%	0%	6%
Missouri Scout/Remington (R)	September 26–27, 2018	1,555	± 2.5%	46%	48%	–	–	–	–	6%
YouGov	September 10–14, 2018	917	–	45%	45%	–	–	–	4%	6%
Trafalgar Group (R)	September 11–13, 2018	1,724	± 2.4%	44%	47%	–	–	–	–	8%
Fox News	September 8–11, 2018	675 LV	± 3.5%	44%	41%	1%	3%	1%	1%	8%
Fox News	September 8–11, 2018	675 LV	± 3.5%	45%	45%	–	–	–	3%	7%
Fox News	September 8–11, 2018	808 RV	± 3.5%	41%	39%	1%	4%	1%	1%	11%
Fox News	September 8–11, 2018	808 RV	± 3.5%	42%	43%	–	–	–	3%	10%
NBC News/Marist	August 25–28, 2018	568 LV	± 4.8%	44%	40%	5%	–	3%	<1%	8%
NBC News/Marist	August 25–28, 2018	568 LV	± 4.8%	47%	47%	–	–	–	1%	5%
NBC News/Marist	August 25–28, 2018	774 RV	± 4.2%	43%	39%	6%	–	3%	<1%	8%
NBC News/Marist	August 25–28, 2018	774 RV	± 4.2%	46%	47%	–	–	–	1%	5%
WPA Intelligence (R-Club For Growth)	August 12–14, 2018	501	± 4.4%	41%	48%	–	–	–	3%	8%
Missouri Scout/Remington (R)	August 8–9, 2018	1,785	± 2.3%	47%	47%	–	–	–	–	6%
WPA Intelligence (R-Club For Growth)	July 10–12, 2018	602	± 4.0%	42%	43%	–	–	–	4%	11%
The Missouri Times/Remington (R)	July 7–8, 2018	1,034	± 3.2%	46%	48%	–	–	–	–	6%
SurveyMonkey/Axios	June 11 – July 2, 2018	1,038	± 5.0%	49%	47%	–	–	–	–	4%
McLaughlin (R-Missouri Rising Action)	June 2018	–	–	46%	42%	–	–	–	–	–
Global Strategy Group (D-SMP)	June 11–13, 2018	804	± 3.5%	47%	41%	–	–	–	–	–
Gravis Marketing (R-Petersen)	May 16, 2018	822	± 3.4%	43%	50%	–	–	–	–	7%
Missouri Scout/TJP Strategies (D)	May 9–10, 2018	898	± 3.3%	48%	44%	–	–	–	–	8%
Emerson College	April 26–29, 2018	600	± 4.2%	45%	45%	–	–	–	–	11%
Missouri Scout/TJP Strategies (D)	April 19–20, 2018	1,542	± 2.5%	48%	44%	–	–	–	–	8%
OnMessage Inc. (R-Hawley)	April 16–18, 2018	600	± 4.0%	46%	47%	–	–	–	–	7%
Global Strategy Group (D-SMP)	April 9–12, 2018	–	–	46%	44%	–	–	–	–	–
Mason-Dixon	April 4–6, 2018	625	± 4.0%	45%	44%	–	–	–	–	11%
Gravis Marketing	March 5–7, 2018	931	± 3.2%	42%	40%	–	–	–	–	18%
SurveyMonkey/Axios	February 12 – March 5, 2018	1,938	± 3.6%	44%	52%	–	–	–	–	4%
Public Policy Polling (D-TMI)	January 8–9, 2018	965	± 3.2%	45%	44%	–	–	–	–	11%
Missouri Scout/Remington (R)	January 3–4, 2018	1,122	± 2.9%	45%	49%	–	–	–	–	6%
Missouri Scout/Remington (R)	October 11–12, 2017	965	± 3.1%	45%	48%	–	–	–	–	7%
Missouri Scout/Remington (R)	August 16–18, 2017	922	± 3.0%	45%	50%	–	–	–	–	5%
Fabrizio Lee (R)	July 10–11, 2017	500	± 4.4%	42%	46%	–	–	–	–	12%
Missouri Scout/Remington (R)	July 7–8, 2017	928	± 3.2%	44%	50%	–	–	–	–	6%

Hypothetical polling

with Austin Petersen

Poll source	Date(s) administered	Sample size	Margin of error	Claire McCaskill (D)	Austin Petersen (R)	Undecided
Gravis Marketing (R-Petersen)	May 16, 2018	822	± 3.4%	40%	56%	4%

with generic Republican

Poll source	Date(s) administered	Sample size	Margin of error	Claire McCaskill (D)	Generic Republican	Undecided
Fabrizio Lee (R)	July 10–11, 2017	500	± 4.4%	38%	54%	8%

with Vicky Hartzler

Poll source	Date(s) administered	Sample size	Margin of error	Claire McCaskill (D)	Vicky Hartzler (R)	Undecided
Missouri Scout/Remington (R)	July 7–8, 2017	928	± 3.2%	44%	48%	8%

with Blaine Luetkemeyer

Poll source	Date(s) administered	Sample size	Margin of error	Claire McCaskill (D)	Blaine Luetkemeyer (R)	Undecided
Missouri Scout/Remington (R)	July 7–8, 2017	928	± 3.2%	43%	50%	7%

with Todd Richardson

Poll source	Date(s) administered	Sample size	Margin of error	Claire McCaskill (D)	Todd Richardson (R)	Undecided
Missouri Scout/Remington (R)	July 7–8, 2017	928	± 3.2%	43%	48%	9%

with Eric Schmitt

Poll source	Date(s) administered	Sample size	Margin of error	Claire McCaskill (D)	Eric Schmitt (R)	Undecided
Missouri Scout/Remington (R)	July 7–8, 2017	928	± 3.2%	45%	49%	6%

with Jason Smith

Poll source	Date(s) administered	Sample size	Margin of error	Claire McCaskill (D)	Jason Smith (R)	Undecided
Missouri Scout/Remington (R)	June 7–8, 2017	928	± 3.2%	45%	48%	7%

=== Results ===
State Senate districts results

State House districts results

Senator McCaskill conceded a few hours after the polls closed on election day. Despite performing strongly in the St. Louis suburbs, she ran well behind her 2012 vote in Southeast Missouri, especially in the Lead Belt and the Missouri Bootheel. She also ran poorly in the northern part of the state.

United States Senate election in Missouri, 2018
Party	Candidate	Votes	%	±%
Republican	Josh Hawley	1,254,927	51.38%	+12.27
Democratic	Claire McCaskill (incumbent)	1,112,935	45.57%	−9.24
Independent	Craig O'Dear	34,398	1.41%	N/A
Libertarian	Japheth Campbell	27,316	1.12%	−4.95
Green	Jo Crain	12,706	0.52%	N/A
Write-in		7	0.00%	N/A
Total votes		2,442,289	100.00%	N/A
Republican gain from Democratic				

==== Counties that flipped from Democratic to Republican ====
- Audrain (largest city: Mexico)
- Bates (largest city: Butler)
- Chariton (largest city: Salisbury)
- Clark (largest city: Kahoka)
- Clinton (largest city: Cameron)
- Daviess (largest city: Gallatin)
- Dunklin (largest city: Kennett)
- Franklin (largest city: Washington)
- Gentry (largest city: Albany)
- Grundy (largest city: Trenton)
- Henry (largest city: Clinton)
- Hickory (largest city: Hermitage)
- Howard (largest city: Fayette)
- Iron (largest city: Ironton)
- Knox (largest city: Edina)
- Lafayette (largest city: Odessa)
- Lewis (largest city: Canton)
- Linn (largest city: Brookfield)
- Livingston (largest city: Chillicothe)
- Madison (largest city: Fredericktown)
- Nodaway (largest city: Maryville)
- Pike (largest city: Bowling Green)
- Reynolds (largest city: Ellington)
- Schuyler (largest city: Lancaster)
- Scotland (largest city: Memphis)
- Scott (largest city: Sikeston)
- Shannon (largest city: Winona)
- St. Francois (largest city: Farmington)
- Sullivan (largest city: Milan)
- Wayne (largest city: Piedmont)
- Worth (largest city: Grant City)
- Buchanan (largest city: St. Joseph)
- Jefferson (largest city: Arnold)
- Mississippi (largest city: Charleston)
- New Madrid (largest city: New Madrid)
- Pemiscot (largest city: Caruthersville)
- Platte (largest city: Kansas City)
- Ray (largest city: Richmond)
- Saline (largest city: Marshall)
- Washington (largest city: Potosi)
- Sainte Genevieve (largest city: Ste. Genevieve)
- St. Charles (largest city: O'Fallon)
- Pettis (largest city: Sedalia)
- Pulaski (largest city: Fort Leonard Wood)
- Adair (largest city: Kirksville)
- Andrew (largest city: Savannah)
- Cass (largest city: Harrisonville)
- Greene (largest city: Springfield)
- Johnson (largest city: Warrensburg)

==== By congressional district ====
Hawley won five of eight congressional districts, with the remaining three going to McCaskill, including one that elected a Republican.

District	McCaskill	Hawley	Representative
1st	82%	16%	Lacy Clay
2nd	50%	48%	Ann Wagner
3rd	38%	59%	Blaine Luetkemeyer
4th	36%	60%	Vicky Hartzler
5th	61%	36%	Emanuel Cleaver
6th	39%	58%	Sam Graves
7th	31%	65%	Billy Long
8th	28%	69%	Jason Smith

==== Voter demographics ====
Edison Research exit poll
Demographic subgroup	McCaskill	Hawley	% of voters
Gender
Men	42	57	49
Women	51	47	51
Age
18–24 years old	55	42	6
25–29 years old	57	42	7
30–39 years old	52	45	15
40–49 years old	44	54	16
50–64 years old	43	56	31
65 and older	45	54	25
Race
White	42	57	84
Black	91	8	8
Latino	53	44	4
Race by gender
White men	37	62	41
White women	46	52	43
Black men	91	7	4
Black women	90	9	5
Education
High school or less	34	64	22
Some college education	48	51	27
Associate degree	46	53	14
Bachelor's degree	51	48	22
Advanced degree	58	41	15
Party ID
Democrats	93	6	31
Republicans	7	92	37
Independents	46	51	32
Ideology
Liberals	90	9	23
Moderates	60	37	38
Conservatives	8	91	39
Marital status
Married	43	55	63
Unmarried	57	41	37
Gender by marital status
Married men	39	61	34
Married women	49	49	28
Unmarried men	47	50	11
Unmarried women	64	33	21
First-time midterm election voter
Yes	59	38	13
No	44	56	87
Most important issue facing the country
Immigration	13	86	20
Healthcare	71	27	47
Gun policy	52	47	8
Economy	33	65	23
Area type
Urban	67	32	35
Suburban	42	57	37
Rural	27	71	28
Source: CNN
