= 1958 Missouri State Auditor election =

- November 4, 1958

Nominee	Haskell Holman	Meredith Garten
Party	Democratic	Republican
Popular vote	730,330	420,606
Percentage	63.46%	36.54%
State Auditor before election
Haskell Holman
Democratic
Elected State Auditor
Haskell Holman
Democratic

The 1958 Missouri State Auditor election was held on November 4, 1958, in order to elect the state auditor of Missouri. Democratic nominee and incumbent state auditor Haskell Holman defeated Republican nominee Meredith Garten.

== General election ==
On election day, November 4, 1958, Democratic nominee Haskell Holman won re-election by a margin of 309,724 votes against his opponent Republican nominee Meredith Garten, thereby retaining Democratic control over the office of state auditor. Holman was sworn in for his second term on January 12, 1959.

=== Results ===
Missouri State Auditor election, 1958
Party	Candidate	Votes	%
Democratic	Haskell Holman (incumbent)	730,330	63.46
Republican	Meredith Garten	420,606	36.54
Total votes		1,150,936	100.00
Democratic hold			
