= Nicole Galloway =

American accountant and politician (born 1982)

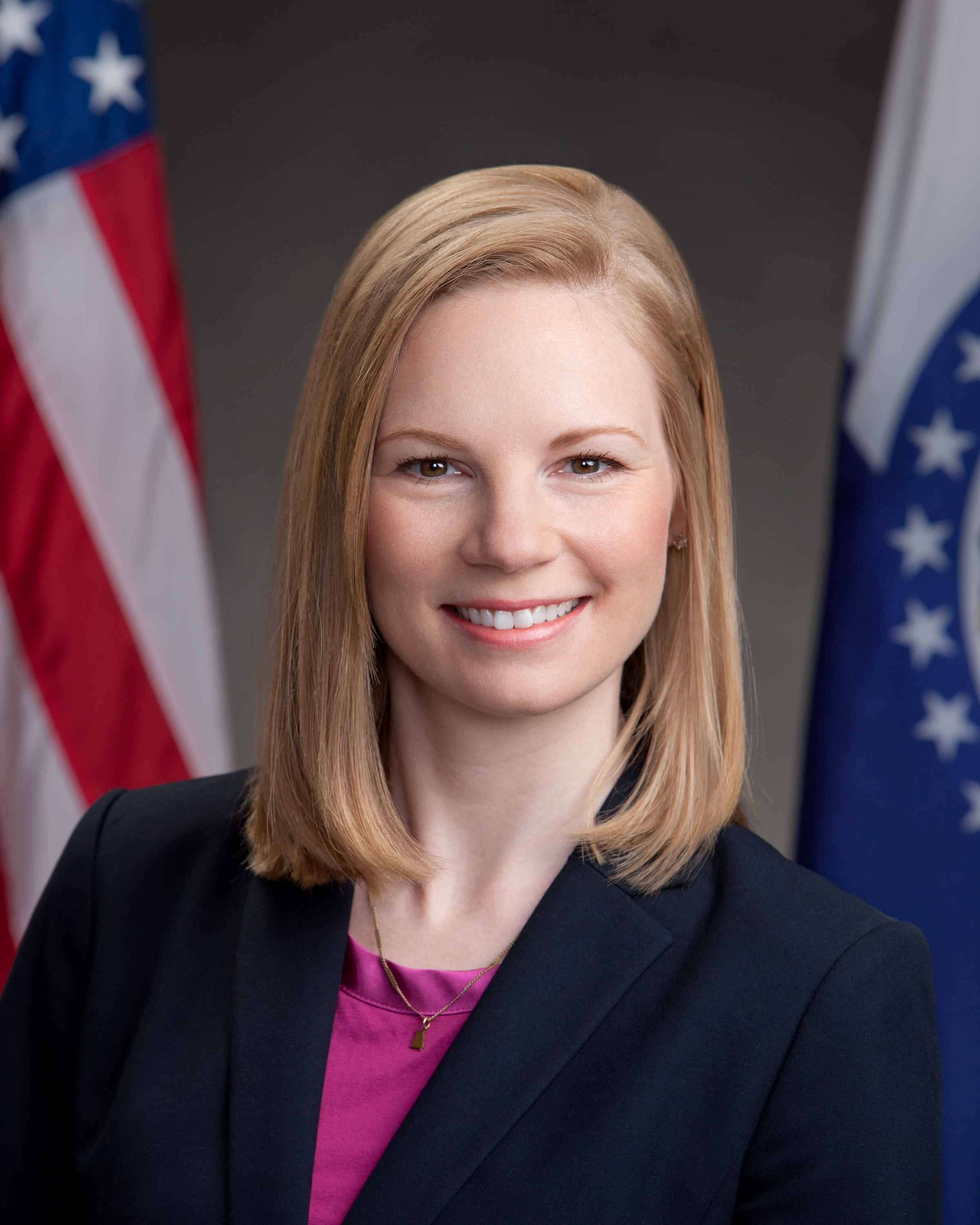

38th Auditor of Missouri
- In office April 27, 2015 – January 9, 2023
- Governor: Jay Nixon; Eric Greitens; Mike Parson
- Preceded by: Tom Schweich
- Succeeded by: Scott Fitzpatrick

Personal details
- Born: Nicole Marie Rogge; June 13, 1982 (age 44) St. Louis, Missouri, U.S.
- Party: Democratic
- Spouse: Jon Galloway
- Children: 3
- Education: Missouri University of Science and Technology (BS); University of Missouri (MBA)

Nicole Marie Galloway (née Rogge; born June 13, 1982) is an American politician and accountant who served as the state auditor of Missouri from 2015 to 2023. A member of the Democratic Party, she was the party's nominee for Governor of Missouri in the 2020 election, losing to incumbent Republican Mike Parson. As of 2026, Galloway is the most recent Democrat to have won or held statewide office in Missouri.

Galloway was appointed to the office of State Auditor by Governor Jay Nixon on April 14, 2015, following the death of Tom Schweich in February 2015. She was elected to a full term in the 2018 election. In 2018, following the electoral defeat of U.S. Senator Claire McCaskill to Josh Hawley, Galloway became both the only female state officeholder and the only Democratic statewide elected official in Missouri.

Galloway's term as state auditor ended in January 2023, after she did not seek reelection in 2022.

== Early life and education ==
Galloway grew up in Fenton, Missouri and graduated high school from Ursuline Academy in Oakland, Missouri. She holds a bachelor's degree in applied mathematics and economics from Missouri University of Science and Technology in Rolla. During college, she was a member of the S&T soccer team, member of a service organization, and was a server at Applebee's.

She has a master's degree in business administration from the University of Missouri. She is a Certified Public Accountant and Certified Fraud Examiner.

== Private sector career ==
Before working in government, Galloway worked at the public accounting firm of Brown Smith Wallace in Creve Coeur, Missouri. At Brown Smith Wallace, she served as an auditor of national and international Fortune 500 companies and insurance companies. She has worked at Allstate Insurance as an actuarial analyst and at Shelter Insurance's Columbia headquarters as a corporate auditor.

Galloway cited her experience in the private sector as key to being a "strong, independent watchdog for Missourians" in her role as auditor of Missouri.

She served as secretary/treasurer of the Missouri Technology Corporation, helping invest in entrepreneurs to create jobs for Missourians. She held the same role for the Missouri County Employees' Retirement Fund to safeguard retirement benefits of 16,000 Missouri residents in 111 counties across the state and spearheaded the initiative to ensure equally protected benefits of county employees in same-sex marriages.

== Boone County Treasurer ==
Galloway served as treasurer of Boone County, Missouri from April 2011 until her appointment as state auditor four years later. As county treasurer, she managed a $100 million investment portfolio and issued all general obligation and revenue bonds for the county. Galloway developed a debt issuance policy in 2012 that provided increased transparency. In 2011, Boone County became the first Missouri county to maintain an online search and claim system for unclaimed property which oversaw the distribution of approximately $20,000 in unclaimed property in 2014.

During her service as County Treasurer, Galloway served on the Missouri Technology Corporation and Missouri County Employees’ Retirement Fund. As a board member for retirement fund board she was the leader for expanding benefits to members’ same-sex spouses.

Following Galloway's resignation as Boone County Treasurer on April 27, 2015, Kay Murray was appointed as interim County Treasurer.

== Missouri State Auditor ==
=== Tenure ===
Galloway said that her goals as State Auditor of Missouri are to hold her office and others to the highest professional standards and being accountable to Missourians.

Upon taking the oath of office in 2015, Galloway said one of her first priorities as State Auditor of Missouri would be cybersecurity by making protection of Missourians' private data part of audit procedures for the State Auditor's Office.

As State Auditor of Missouri, Galloway managed about 115 employees. The state auditor's staff is made up of CPAs, with about 65 percent of all audit staff having at least one professional license, certification or advanced degree. Employment as an auditor with the State Auditor's Office qualifies as mandatory experience required for licensure by the Missouri State Board of Accountancy as a certified public accountant.

Additional responsibilities of the State Auditor's Office included serving as the independent, professional watchdog for government. The State Auditor's Office works to ensure the proper use of public funds and to improve the efficiency and effectiveness of Missouri government by performing audits of state agencies, boards and commissions, the circuit court system, the counties in Missouri that do not have a county auditor, and other political subdivisions upon petition by the voters. These audits examine financial accountability, waste, opportunities for fraud, and whether government organizations and programs are achieving their purposes and operating economically and efficiently.

==== Callaway County ====
On September 24, 2018, Auditor Galloway released an audit showing $300,000 missing from the Callaway County Collector's Office from January 2016 to March 2018. The former county collector pleaded guilty in federal court to embezzling the funds.

On March 4, 2019, former Callaway County Collector Pamela Oestreich was sentenced to two years and six months in federal prison without parole for embezzling more than $300,000 from taxpayers in Callaway County.

==== Putnam County Hospital ====
In 2017, Auditor Galloway released an audit that uncovered a billing scheme in which Putnam County Memorial Hospital billed insurance companies for lab services conducted across the country. The questionable activity began in September 2016, after the Putnam County Hospital Board hired David Byrns and his company, Hospital Partners Inc., to take over day-to-day management of the hospital. The auditor's report uncovered $90 million in inappropriate lab billings. The findings of the audit were covered by national news outlets and resulted in calls for a federal investigation into hospital billing schemes.

Following the audit, dozens of major insurers banded together to file lawsuits against affiliated hospitals in Missouri and other states, demanding hundreds of millions in restitution. The lawsuits describe the lab-billing operation as a "widespread fraudulent scheme".

==== Audit of City of Viburnum ====
On June 21, 2017, Auditor Galloway released an audit showing that the city clerk of Viburnum, Missouri stole $100,000. Dana Mayberry served as the Viburnum City Clerk for 14 years. The city identified inconsistencies in accounts she oversaw after she lost her reelection bid in April 2016. At that time, most of the city and municipal division records disappeared in the Iron County town of less than 1,000 residents. Mayberry admitted to stealing city funds, after which the mayor notified the State Auditor's Office. An audit began in August 2016 after the Viburnum Board of Aldermen authorized one. The examination began to uncover a scheme in which the former clerk adjusted customer utility accounts and then destroyed records and other evidence. The former city Clerk was charged with receiving stolen property, a Class B Felony as a result of the audit. On August 15, 2018, the former city Clerk was sentenced to five years probation and ordered to pay the City of Viburnum $100,000.

==== Missouri Alliance for Freedom v. Galloway ====
In May 2017, the Missouri Alliance for Freedom, a Republican-aligned 501(c)(4) group, submitted three open-records requests to the Office of State Auditor. The requests sought a wide variety of communications, including those specifically concerning the auditor's scrutiny of the Missouri Department of Revenue. The State Auditor's Office produced approximately 47,000 pages at no charge to the Missouri Alliance for Freedom, including 254 screenshots of text messages to and from the state auditor.

In 2017, the Missouri Alliance for Freedom sued the State Auditor's Office and filed a complaint with Republican Missouri attorney general Josh Hawley alleging that Galloway "unlawfully withheld public records from her state-provided cell phone." In February 2018, Hawley's office issued a report that found Galloway complied with the Missouri Sunshine Law. The same month, the judge dismissed the majority of the claims against the State Auditor's Office, and ordered the Missouri Alliance for Freedom to re-plead its claims. In January 2019, following a trial, Circuit Court Judge Jon Beetem ruled against the Missouri Alliance for Freedom on all claims, ending the suit with a judgment in favor of Galloway. The judge concluded that the State Auditor's Office had made "an enormous good-faith effort to comply with several very large public records requests" and found that the office's records custodian did not apparently realize (until it was too late) that the phones issued by the office to Galloway and to employees automatically deleted text messages after 30 days. The Missouri Alliance for Freedom chose not to appeal.

=== Elections ===
==== 2018 Missouri State Auditor election ====
Galloway was appointed to the post of Missouri State Auditor by Governor Jay Nixon in 2015 following the death of Republican Auditor Tom Schweich. She won election to a full term as Missouri State Auditor on November 6, 2018. She opted not to run for reelection in 2022 and her term expired in January 2023, leaving the Democrats with no statewide elected offices in Missouri, when Republican Scott Fitzpatrick was sworn in as State Auditor.

Missouri State Auditor election, 2018
Party	Candidate	Votes	%
Democratic	Nicole Galloway	1,209,881	50.41%
Republican	Saundra McDowell	1,070,701	44.61%
Libertarian	Sean O'Toole	51,304	2.14%
Constitution	Jacob Luetkemeyer	50,951	2.12%
Green	Don Fitz	17,106	0.72%
Write-in		4	0.00%
Total votes		2,399,947	100.00%
Democratic hold			

== 2020 gubernatorial campaign ==
In August 2019, Galloway announced that she was seeking the Democratic nomination for the 2020 Missouri gubernatorial election and officially won the primary on August 4, 2020. Galloway faced incumbent Republican governor Mike Parson in what was anticipated to be a close race.

Parson, a former lieutenant governor who assumed the post following the resignation of Eric Greitens in June, 2018, announced in September 2019 that he would seek a full term as governor. In her campaign announcement video, Galloway emphasized her record in exposing public corruption, pledged to reduce the influence of special interest groups on the Missouri legislature, and attacked the Parson administration for its efforts to curb the effects of a government transparency initiative that was passed by statewide ballot in 2018.

At the time, Galloway was the only Democratic politician holding statewide office in Missouri, as well as the only female officeholder. She lost the election to incumbent Republican governor Mike Parson by nearly 17% (almost half a million votes). Had she won the election, she would have become the state's first female governor.

=== Endorsements ===
Galloway's endorsements included former president Barack Obama, former vice president and 2020 presidential candidate Joe Biden, U.S. Senator Elizabeth Warren, New Jersey Governor Phil Murphy, U.S. Representative from Missouri's 5th District Emanuel Cleaver, Kansas City, Missouri Mayor Quinton Lucas, former Georgia House of Representatives minority leader Stacey Abrams. Three famous St. Louis natives also campaigned with her: model Karlie Kloss, Bravo host Andy Cohen, and journalist Derek Blasberg.

Her endorsements from national organizations or state chapters of national organizations included Sierra Club, EMILY's List, Planned Parenthood, Missouri AFL-CIO, End Citizens United, Let America Vote, the National Women's Political Caucus, and the Missouri Women's Leadership Council.

The Editorial Boards at The St. Louis Post-Dispatch, Missouri's most circulated newspaper; The Kansas City Star, Missouri's second most circulated newspaper; and The St. Louis American, a newspaper that serves the St. Louis-area African-American community, all endorsed Galloway.

=== Results ===
Missouri gubernatorial election, 2020
Party	Candidate	Votes	%	±%
Republican	Mike Parson (incumbent)	1,720,202	57.11%	+5.97%
Democratic	Nicole Galloway	1,225,771	40.69%	−4.88%
Libertarian	Rik Combs	49,067	1.63%	+0.16%
Green	Jerome Bauer	17,234	0.57%	−0.18%
Write-in		13	0.00%	±0.00%
Total votes		3,012,287	100.0%	
Turnout		3,026,028	70.07%	
Registered electors		4,318,758		
Republican hold				

== Personal life ==
A native of Fenton, Missouri, Galloway lives in Columbia, Missouri with her husband, Jon Galloway, and their three sons. Jon served as press secretary to then-State Treasurer Clint Zweifel. In August 2016, she announced that she was pregnant with her third child, due in January 2017, and was the first statewide officeholder in Missouri history to become pregnant while in office. Her third son was born on January 6, 2017.

Galloway has been a board member for the Heart of Missouri United Way and the finance committee of the Columbia Interfaith Resource Center. She also has been a mentor for children at Discovering Options in St. Louis and is a member of her local Rotary.

Political offices
Preceded by Tom Schweich	Auditor of Missouri; 2015–2023	Succeeded by Scott Fitzpatrick
Party political offices
Vacant Title last held by Susan Montee	Democratic nominee for Auditor of Missouri; 2018	Succeeded by Alan Green
Preceded by Chris Koster	Democratic nominee for Governor of Missouri; 2020	Succeeded by Crystal Quade
