= Charles Shields =

Charlie or Charles Shields may refer to:

- Charles Woodruff Shields (1825–1904), American theologian
- Charles W. Shields (born 1959), American politician
- Charlie Shields (1900s pitcher) (1879–1953), baseball player
- Charlie Shields (1940s pitcher) (1922–1955), Negro league baseball player
- Charles J. Shields (born 1951), American biographer
