= 1962 Missouri State Auditor election =

- November 6, 1962

Nominee	Haskell Holman	Joseph M. Badgett
Party	Democratic	Republican
Popular vote	680,805	512,768
Percentage	57.04%	42.96%
State Auditor before election
Haskell Holman
Democratic
Elected State Auditor
Haskell Holman
Democratic

The 1962 Missouri State Auditor election was held on November 6, 1962, in order to elect the state auditor of Missouri. Democratic nominee and incumbent state auditor Haskell Holman defeated Republican nominee Joseph M. Badgett.

== General election ==
On election day, November 6, 1962, Democratic nominee Haskell Holman won re-election by a margin of 168,037 votes against his opponent Republican nominee Joseph M. Badgett, thereby retaining Democratic control over the office of state auditor. Holman was sworn in for his third term on January 14, 1963.

=== Results ===
Missouri State Auditor election, 1962
Party	Candidate	Votes	%
Democratic	Haskell Holman (incumbent)	680,805	57.04
Republican	Joseph M. Badgett	512,768	42.96
Total votes		1,193,573	100.00
Democratic hold			
