= 2010 Missouri State Auditor election =

- November 2, 2010
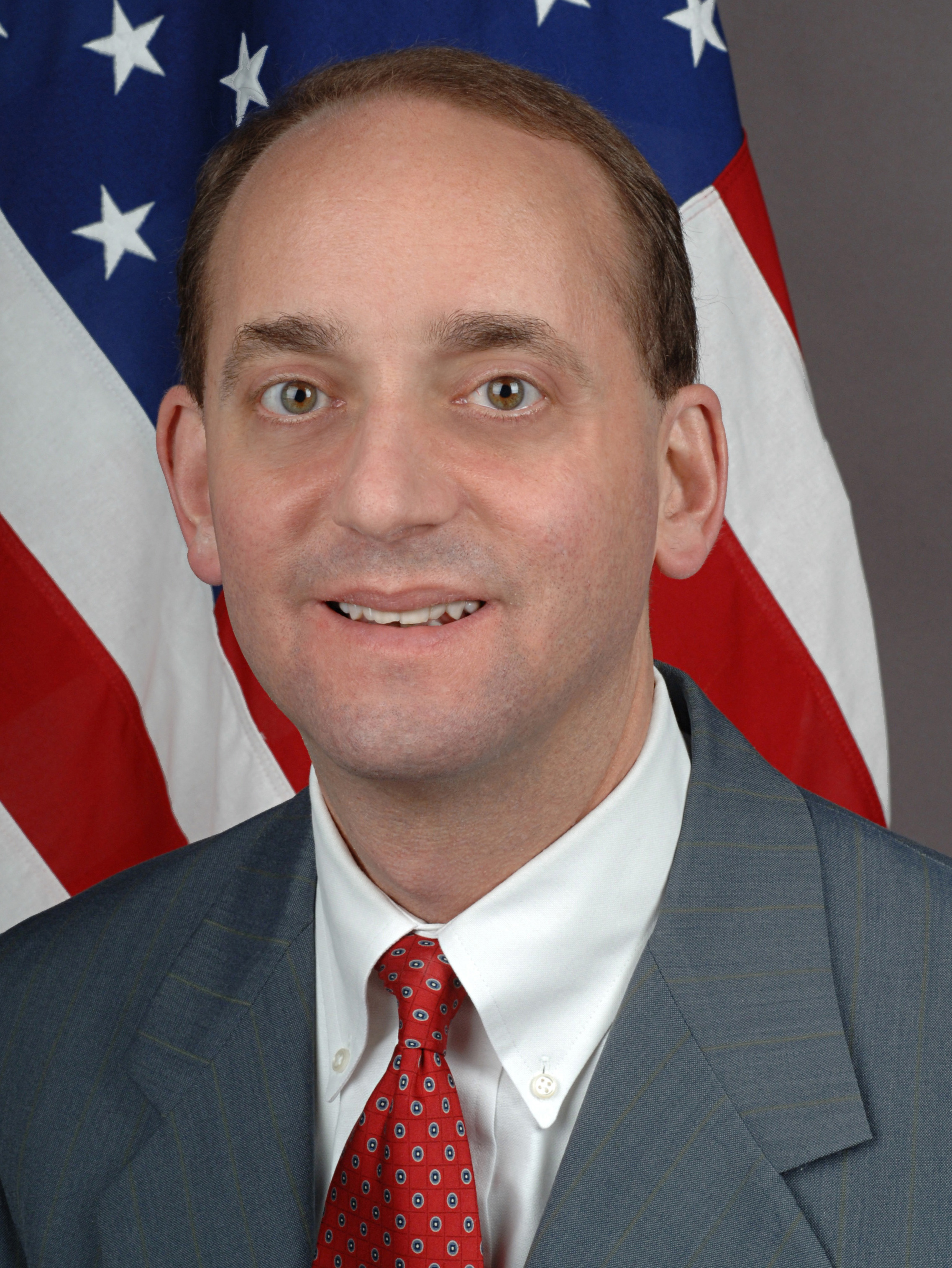

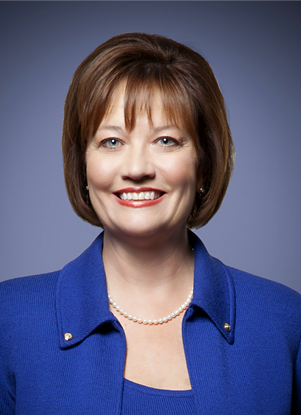
Nominee	Tom Schweich	Susan Montee
Party	Republican	Democratic
Popular vote	974,517	871,867
Percentage	50.8%	45.5%
- County results Schweich: 40–50% 50–60% 60–70% 70–80% Montee: 40–50% 50–60% 80–90%
State Auditor before election
Susan Montee
Democratic
Elected State Auditor
Tom Schweich
Republican

The 2010 Missouri State Auditor election took place on November 2, 2010. Republican Ambassador Tom Schweich defeated incumbent Democratic State Auditor Susan Montee. It was only the third time in the last four decades that a sitting auditor in Missouri was unseated. Schweich's victory made him one of only two Republicans elected to Missouri's executive branch.

== Democratic primary ==
=== Campaign ===
Incumbent Missouri State Auditor Susan Montee had token opposition. She easily defeated her lesser known opponent in the Democratic primary.

=== Results ===
Democratic primary results
Party	Candidate	Votes	%
Democratic	Susan Montee (incumbent)	267,960	90.06
Democratic	Abdul Akram	29,579	9.94
Total votes		297,539	100.00

== Republican primary ==
=== Campaign ===
Missouri State Representative Allen Icet announced his candidacy in June, 2009. Ambassador Tom Schweich joined the race in July, 2009, after having considered running for US Senator. The primary was a close race. Icet had experience as the chairman of the state house budget committee and he was supported by 95 state legislators. Schweich had experience managing audits and was supported by Lieutenant Governor of Missouri Peter Kinder, former United States Attorney General John Ashcroft, former Governor of Massachusetts Mitt Romney, four Missouri state senators, and two former United States ambassadors.

Schweich criticized Icet for taking trips and meals from lobbyists and for the fact that the state budget rose from $19 billion to $23 billion while Icet was chairman of the house budget committee. Icet defended himself by saying that the trip he accepted was for educational purposes and by saying that most of the budget increases were due to increased federal spending and mandatory increases of things such as Medicare.

In spite of Icet's support from most of the state legislators, Schweich was able to gain a fundraising advantage and bigger name endorsements.

=== Results ===
Republican primary results
Party	Candidate	Votes	%
Republican	Tom Schweich	315,658	58.61
Republican	Allen Icet	222,889	41.39
Total votes		538,547	100.00

== Libertarian Primary ==
=== Results ===
Libertarian primary results
Party	Candidate	Votes	%
Libertarian	Charles W. Baum	3,354	100.00
Total votes		3,354	100.00

== General election ==
=== Campaign ===
During the campaign Montee attacked Schweich for not being a Certified Public Accountant. Schweich defended himself by pointing to his experience managing audits. During the debate Schweich argued that the state auditor ought to be more of a law enforcement official; he pointed to the fact that he has law enforcement experience, while Montee did not. Montee argued that the state auditor should be a fiscal expert; she again pointed to the fact that she was a CPA, while Schweich was not.

In the end, Schweich defeated Montee with 50.8% of the vote. Schweich obtained strong leads in the rural parts of the state which was sufficient to overcome Montee's leads in urban St. Louis and Jackson County.

=== Results ===
2010 Missouri State Auditor election
Party	Candidate	Votes	%
Republican	Tom Schweich	974,517	50.8%
Democratic	Susan Montee (incumbent)	871,867	45.5%
Libertarian	Charles Baum	70,816	3.7%
Total votes		1,917,200	100.0%
Republican gain from Democratic			

== See also ==
- 2010 Missouri elections
- 2010 United States Senate election in Missouri
- 2010 Missouri Senate election
