= Ben Keathley =

American politician

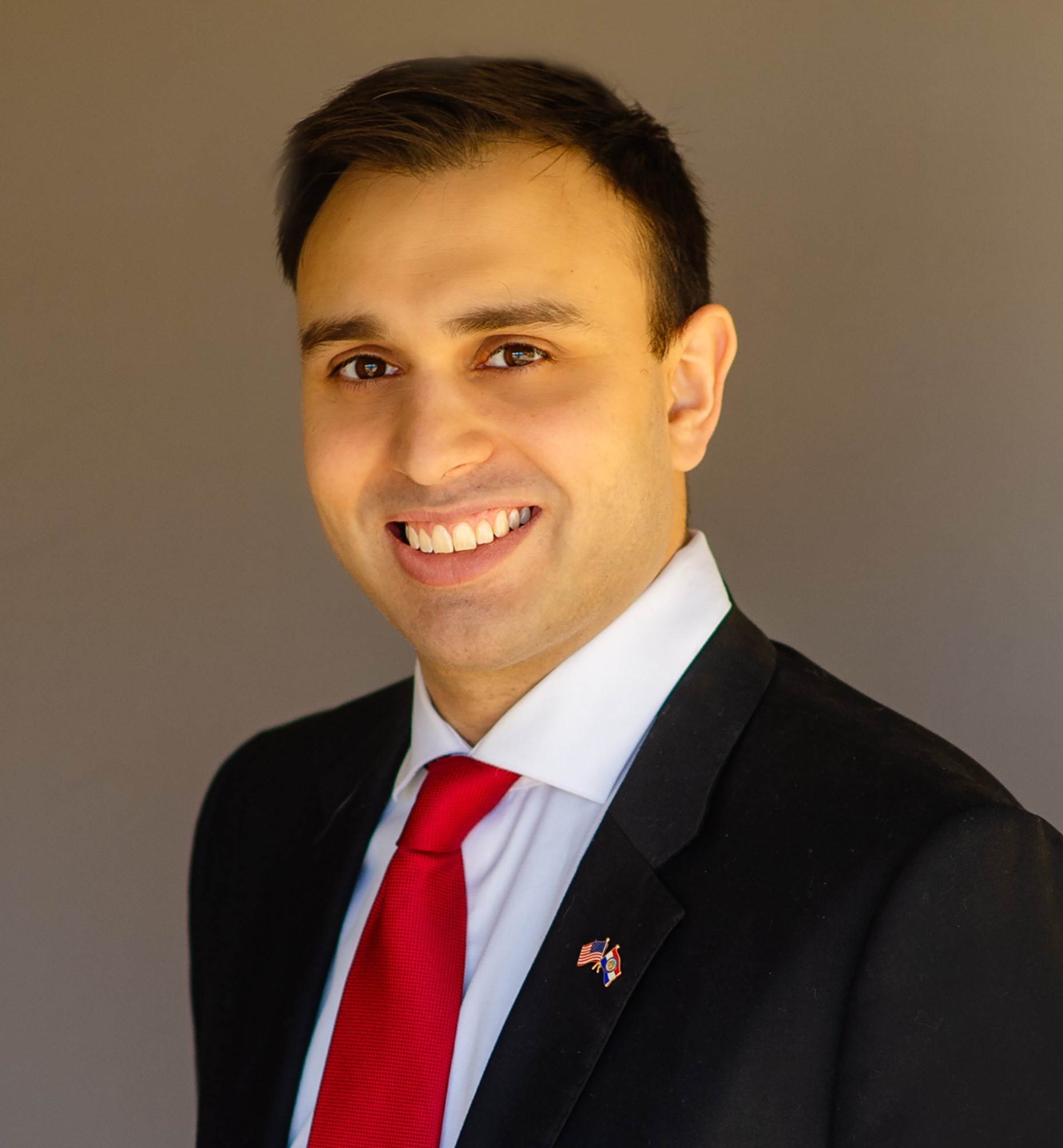

Member of the Missouri House of Representatives from the 101st district
- Incumbent
- Assumed office January 4, 2023
- Preceded by: Bruce DeGroot
- Succeeded by: Paul Lentz (elect)

Personal details
- Born: Benjamin Alan-Kumar Keathley; December 29, 1988 (age 37) St. Louis, Missouri, U.S.
- Party: Republican
- Education: Syracuse University
- Occupation: Lawyer
- Website: Official website

Benjamin Alan-Kumar Keathley is an American politician and lawyer who has served as a member of the Missouri House of Representatives since January 4, 2023. He represents the 101st district, which as of 2022 encompasses a majority of the city of Chesterfield in West St. Louis County, Missouri. Keathley was first elected to the Missouri House of Representatives on November 8, 2022.

== Personal life ==
Keathley is a lifelong resident of St. Louis County. He has Indian and Malaysian ancestry through his Mother, who was born in Malaysia.

He graduated from Marquette High School in Chesterfield. He attended Knox College, earning a Bachelor's Degree. Afterwards, Keathley graduated from Law School at Syracuse University College of Law and obtained a Master's degree in Political Science from the Maxwell School of Citizenship and Public Affairs. Since graduating from Syracuse University, Keathley has worked as an attorney, with his practice based in Chesterfield. In 2017, Keathley was elected to Chesterfield City Council where he served as a council member until 2021. Keathley attends King of Kings Lutheran Church in Chesterfield.

== Politics ==
=== Chesterfield City Council (2017–2021) ===
Keathley was first elected to the Chesterfield City Council as the Ward 2 Council Member on April 4, 2017, winning a four-way race with 43.8% of the vote. In 2019, Keathley was re-elected, receiving 80.08% of the vote on April 2, 2019.

On September 18, 2018, Keathley was the Constitution Day speaker at University of the Incarnate Word, discussing the constitutional role of local government.

Keathley served two terms as chair of the Public Health and Safety Committee for the City of Chesterfield. As a Council Member, Keathley supported body cameras for police officers, opposed a merger of St. Louis City and St. Louis County, and opposed the creation of special taxing districts, such as Tax increment financing districts.

=== State Representative (2023) ===
In 2025 Keathley introduced a bill which would create a "Bitcoin Strategic Reserve Fund" for Missouri and which would allow the state to "accept gifts, grants, donations, bequests or devises of Bitcoin" and would force the state to keep the cryptocurrency for five years before selling or transferring it.

In 2025, Keathley co-sponsored legislation to void non-discrimination ordinances for Section 8 tenants passed in several Missouri cities.

Representative Keathley serves on the following committees:

- Utilities (Vice chairman)
- Professional Registration and Licensing
- Healthcare Reform
- Special Interim Committee on the Earnings Tax
- Subcommittee on Appropriations – General Administration

== Electoral history ==
Missouri House of Representatives Election, November 8, 2022, District 101
Party	Candidate	Votes	%	±%
Republican	Ben Keathley	9,311	52.7	-
Democratic	Melissa Greenstein	8,153	46.1	–
Libertarian	Jeff Coleman	204	1.2	–

Missouri House of Representatives Primary Election, August 2, 2022, District 101
Party	Candidate	Votes	%	±%
Republican	Ben Keathley	2,477	54.8	
Republican	John Brunner	2,040	45.2	–
