= Don Gosen =

American politician

Member of the Missouri House of Representatives from the 101st district
- In office 2013 – February 17, 2016
- Preceded by: Tim Meadows
- Succeeded by: Bruce DeGroot

Member of the Missouri House of Representatives from the 84th district
- In office 2011–2013
- Preceded by: Allen Icet
- Succeeded by: Karla May

Personal details
- Born: January 16, 1963 (age 63)
- Party: Republican
- Spouse: Jeanne
- Children: Laura; Anna; Rachel
- Education: University of Missouri
- Occupation: Small Business Owner; Insurance Agent
- Website: Campaign Website

Don Gosen (born January 16, 1963) is a State Farm Insurance Agent, co-owner of a brewery, and a former Republican member of the Missouri House of Representatives. He had represented the 101st district, which includes parts of Chesterfield, Wildwood, Ellisville, and Clarkson Valley, since 2011.

== Early life and career ==
Don Gosen's father was a teacher and his mother was a homemaker. Don Gosen was raised in Hermann and attended Hermann High School. He then received a BBA-BSBA and MBA from the University of Missouri. He then went to work for Boone County National Bank in Columbia as a commercial loan officer. He moved to upstate New York to continue his career in banking and insurance. For a small time he worked for several breweries, he received Brewing Certificate from the Institute of Brewing and Distilling in London, United Kingdom, and he received his brewing microbiology schooling from the Lallemand Institute in Montreal, Quebec, Canada. He then moved back to St. Louis where helped found the Tin Mill Brewing Company and where he has been a State Farm insurance agent for twenty years. Gosen is a member of the West County Chamber of Commerce, a member of the Wildwood Business Association, a member of the Master Brewers Association of St Louis, and a member and former president of the Wildwood Area Lion's Club. He currently lives in Hermann Missouri and with his wife, and operates a Distillery there. He has 2 grandsons, Hunter, and Camden.

== Political career ==
In 2010, Don Gosen successfully ran to represent the 84th district in the Missouri House of Representatives. He started his campaign in 2009 and was unopposed in both the Republican primary and the general election. He was reelected to represent the 101st district in 2012.

On February 17, 2016 Representative Gosen resigned, after he was asked to resign by Speaker of the House Todd Richardson the evening prior. Reasons the representative gave for resignation included having "personal issues". While the reasons for his resignation were unclear at the time, Gosen later acknowledged it was due to an extramarital affair that began in 2014. In July 2016, Gosen announced that he was considering re-entering politics, considering offices at the city and county (but not state) level.

=== Committee assignments ===
- Elections
- Insurance Policy (Chairman)
- Utilities
- General Laws

== Electoral history ==
2012 General Election for Missouri’s 101st District House of Representatives
| Party | Candidate | Votes | % | ±% |
|---|---|---|---|---|
| Republican | Don Gosen | 16,962 | 100.0 | |

2010 General Election for Missouri’s 84th District House of Representatives
| Party | Candidate | Votes | % | ±% |
|---|---|---|---|---|
| Republican | Don Gosen | 12,571 | 98.77 | |
