= Paul Lentz =

American politician

Member-elect of the Missouri House of Representatives from the 101st district
- Assuming office January 6, 2027
- Succeeding: Ben Keathley

Personal details
- Party: Democratic
- Education: University of Missouri
- Website: Campaign website

Paul Lentz is an American politician of the Missouri Democratic Party who is the representative-elect for the 101st district in the Missouri House of Representatives. He was elected in the 2026 general election.
