= 2014 Missouri State Auditor election =

- November 4, 2014
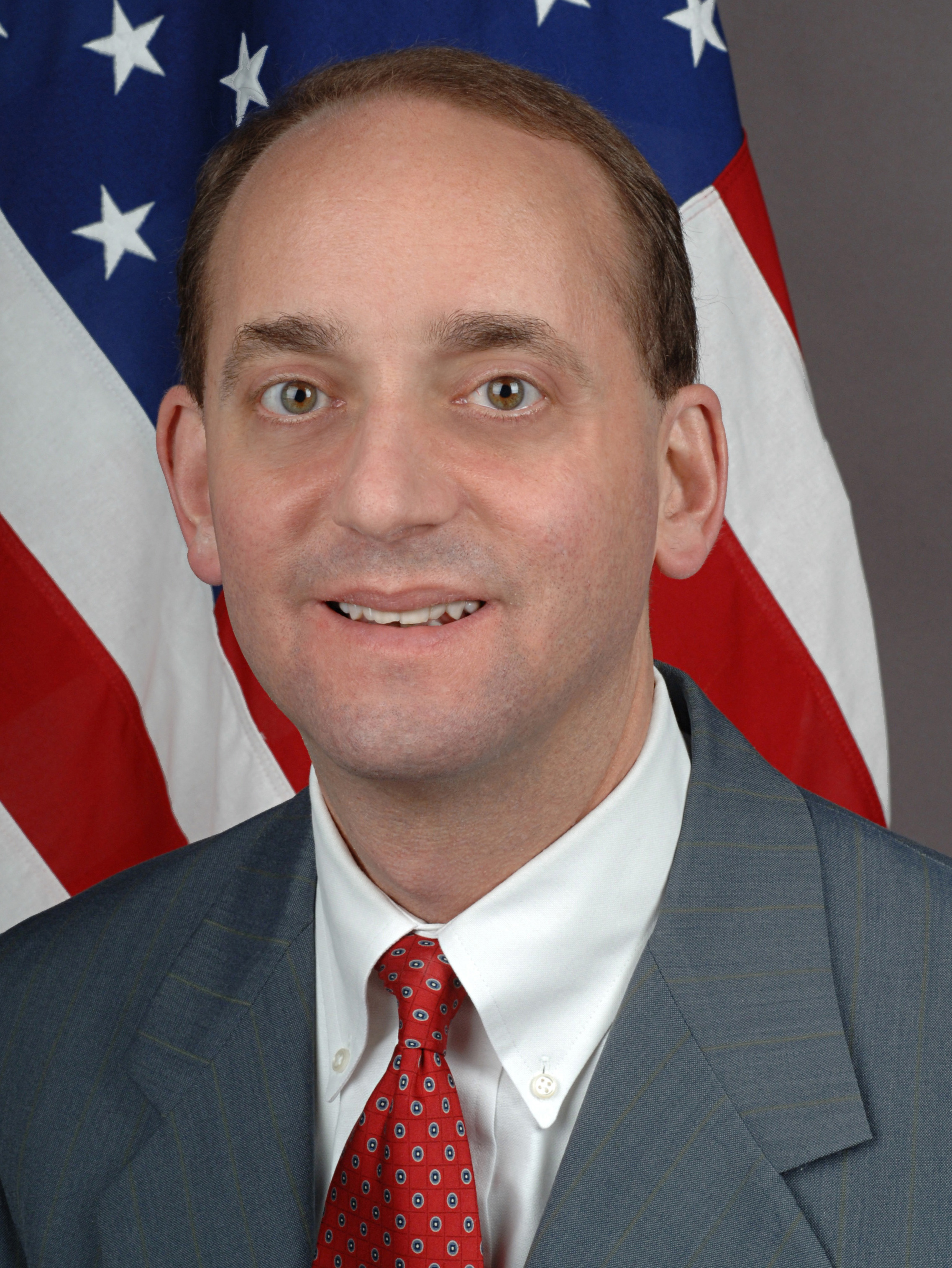

Nominee	Tom Schweich	Sean O'Toole	Rodney Farthing
Party	Republican	Libertarian	Constitution
Popular vote	935,675	251,601	88,757
Percentage	73.3%	19.7%	7.0%
- County results Schweich: 40–50% 50–60% 60–70% 70–80% 80–90%
State Auditor before election
Tom Schweich
Republican
Elected State Auditor
Tom Schweich
Republican

The 2014 Missouri State Auditor election was held on November 4, 2014, to elect the State Auditor of Missouri, concurrently with other state and federal elections.

Incumbent Republican State Auditor Tom Schweich ran for re-election to a second term in office. Facing only token opposition, Schweich won in a landslide, carrying every county. As of 2022, this was the last time the counties of Jackson and St. Louis were won by the Republican candidate. Schweich was only serve a short period into his second term before he died on February 26, 2015.

== Republican primary ==
=== Candidates ===
==== Declared ====
- Tom Schweich, incumbent state auditor

== Democratic primary ==
=== Candidates ===
==== Withdrew ====
- Jay Swearingen, state representative

==== Declined ====
- Barry Aycock, businessman
- Judy Baker, former state representative, nominee for Missouri's 9th congressional district in 2008 and candidate for Lieutenant Governor of Missouri in 2012
- Courtney Curtis, state representative
- Gregory F.X. Daly, St. Louis Collector of Revenue
- Keith English, state representative
- Vicki Englund, state representative
- Darlene Green, St. Louis Comptroller
- Timothy P. Green, former state senator
- Jason Holsman, state senator
- Tishaura Jones, St. Louis Treasurer and former state representative
- Jeremy LaFaver, state representative
- Ryan McKenna, state senator
- Adam Paul, Mayor of Ellisville
- Scott Sifton, state senator
- Francis G. Slay, Mayor of St. Louis
- Steve Stenger, St. Louis County Councilman (elected St. Louis County Executive)
- Stephen Webber, state representative
- John Wright, state representative
- Clint Zweifel, State Treasurer of Missouri

== Third parties ==
=== Candidates ===
==== Declared ====
- Rodney Farthing (Constitution Party), minister, development director for ARM Prison Outreach and nominee for state treasurer in 2008
- Sean O'Toole (Libertarian Party), software developer, former agriculture commodities trader, nominee for the state house in 2010 and for state treasurer in 2012

== General election ==
=== Results ===
2014 Missouri State Auditor election
Party	Candidate	Votes	%
Republican	Tom Schweich (incumbent)	935,675	73.33%
Libertarian	Sean O'Toole	251,601	19.72%
Constitution	Rodney Farthing	88,757	6.96%
Total votes		1,276,033	100.00%
Republican hold			

== See also ==
- 2014 United States elections
