= Bruce DeGroot =

American politician and attorney

Member of the Missouri House of Representatives from the 101st district
- In office January 4, 2017 – January 4, 2023
- Preceded by: Don Gosen
- Succeeded by: Ben Keathley

Personal details
- Born: October 30, 1963 (age 62) Sioux Falls, South Dakota, U.S.
- Party: Republican

Bruce DeGroot (born October 30, 1963) is an American politician and attorney who served in the Missouri House of Representatives from the 101st district from 2017 through 2023. The district included parts of Chesterfield, Wildwood, Ellisville, and Clarkson Valley.

== Early life and career ==
Bruce DeGroot was born in Sioux Falls, South Dakota and is a descendant of Buffalo Bill. Rep. DeGroot graduated from Sioux Falls Christian High School in 1982. He earned his bachelor's degree in 1987 from the University of South Dakota and his J.D. from Saint Louis University School of Law.

Mr. DeGroot currently serves as counsel at the lawfirm of Brown & James in the St. Louis and Columbia, Mo., offices.

He currently resides in Chesterfield. He attends the Ascension Parish, where he is also a board member for the Ascension Athletic Association.
