= 2010 United States Senate election in Missouri =

- November 2, 2010
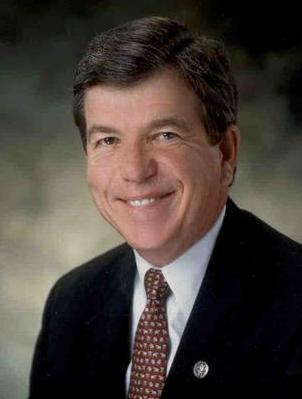

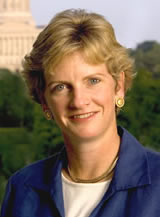
| Nominee | Roy Blunt | Robin Carnahan |
| Party | Republican | Democratic |
| Popular vote | 1,054,160 | 789,736 |
| Percentage | 54.23% | 40.63% |
- County results Blunt: 40–50% 50–60% 60–70% 70–80% Carnahan: 50–60% 70–80%
U.S. senator before election
Kit Bond
Republican
Elected U.S. Senator
Roy Blunt
Republican

The 2010 United States Senate election in Missouri took place on November 2, 2010, alongside 36 other elections to the United States Senate in other states, as well as elections to the United States House of Representatives and various state and local elections. Primary elections were held on August 3, 2010. Incumbent Republican U.S. Senator Kit Bond decided to retire instead of seeking a fifth term. Republican nominee Roy Blunt won the open seat.

== Republican primary ==
=== Candidates ===
- Roy Blunt, U.S. representative since 1997
- Davis Conway
- Tony Laszacs
- Hector Maldonado, sales representative
- Kristi Nichols, sales manager, activist, perennial candidate
- R.L. Praprotnik
- Chuck Purgason, state senator
- Deborah Solomon
- Mike Vontz

=== Polling ===
| Poll source | Dates administered | Roy Blunt | Chuck Purgason | Undecided |
|---|---|---|---|---|
| Public Policy Polling | November 13–15, 2009 | 53% | 16% | 31% |
| Public Policy Polling | March 27–28, 2010 | 48% | 18% | 34% |

=== Results ===
Republican primary results
| Party | Candidate | Votes | % |
|---|---|---|---|
| Republican | Roy Blunt | 411,040 | 70.9% |
| Republican | Chuck Purgason | 75,663 | 13.1% |
| Republican | Kristi Nichols | 40,744 | 7.0% |
| Republican | Deborah Solomon | 15,099 | 2.6% |
| Republican | Hector Maldonado | 8,731 | 1.5% |
| Republican | Davis Conway | 8,525 | 1.5% |
| Republican | R.L. Praprotnik | 8,047 | 1.4% |
| Republican | Tony Laszacs | 6,309 | 1.1% |
| Republican | Mike Vontz | 5,190 | 0.9% |
| Total votes | | 579,348 | 100.00% |

== Democratic primary ==
=== Candidates ===
- Robin Carnahan, Missouri Secretary of State, daughter of former U.S. Senator Jean Carnahan and former governor Mel Carnahan
- Richard Charles Tolbert
- Francis Vangeli

=== Results ===
Democratic primary results
| Party | Candidate | Votes | % |
|---|---|---|---|
| Democratic | Robin Carnahan | 266,349 | 83.9% |
| Democratic | Richard Charles Tolbert | 33,731 | 10.6% |
| Democratic | Francis Vangeli | 17,511 | 5.5% |
| Total votes | | 317,591 | 100.00% |

== Other primaries ==
=== Constitution ===
==== Candidates ====
===== Declared =====
- Jerry Beck
- Joe Martellaro
- Mike Simmons

Constitution Party primary results
| Party | Candidate | Votes | % |
|---|---|---|---|
| Constitution | Jerry Beck | 819 | 43.5% |
| Constitution | Mike Simmons | 554 | 29.4% |
| Constitution | Joe Martello | 511 | 27.1% |
| Total votes | | 1,884 | 100.00% |

=== Libertarian ===
==== Candidates ====
===== Declared =====
- Jonathan Dine
- Cisse Spragins

Libertarian primary results
| Party | Candidate | Votes | % |
|---|---|---|---|
| Libertarian | Jonathan Dine | 2,069 | 58.6% |
| Libertarian | Cisse Spragins | 1,460 | 41.4% |
| Total votes | | 3,529 | 100.00% |

== General election ==
=== Candidates ===
- Jerry Beck (C)
- Roy Blunt (R), U.S. representative
- Robin Carnahan (D), Missouri secretary of state
- Jonathan Dine (L)
- Mark S. Memoly (write-in)
- Frazier Glenn Miller (write-in), perennial candidate
- Jeff Wirick (write-in)
- Richie L. Wolfe (write-in)

=== Campaign ===
Carnahan and national Democrats heavily criticized Blunt for his support of bailouts, calling him "Bailout Blunt." Blunt criticized her for supporting President Obama's stimulus package, the cap-and-trade energy bill, and the Affordable Care Act.

Carnahan was endorsed by the Kansas City Star, St. Louis Post-Dispatch, and St. Louis American.

Blunt was endorsed by the Quincy Herald-Whig and St. Joseph News-Press.

=== Debates ===
- October 14: Televised on Kansas City Public Television in Kansas City, Missouri.
- October 18: Missouri Press Association convention in Lake of the Ozarks State Park.
- October 29: Televised on KTVI in St. Louis.

=== Predictions ===
| Source | Ranking | As of |
|---|---|---|
| Cook Political Report | Lean R | October 26, 2010 |
| Rothenberg | Lean R | October 22, 2010 |
| RealClearPolitics | Likely R | October 26, 2010 |
| Sabato's Crystal Ball | Likely R | October 21, 2010 |
| CQ Politics | Lean R | October 26, 2010 |

=== Polling ===
| Poll source | Date(s) administered | Sample size | Margin of error | Roy Blunt (R) | Robin Carnahan (D) | Other | Undecided |
|---|---|---|---|---|---|---|---|
| Public Policy Polling | January 10–11, 2009 | 867 | ± 3.3% | 44% | 45% | –– | 11% |
| Wilson Strategies (R) | March 7–9, 2009 | 600 | ± 4.0% | 44% | 47% | –– | 9% |
| Democracy Corps (D) | April 28–30, 2009 | 800 | ± 3.5% | 44% | 53% | –– | 3% |
| Momentum Analysis (D) | September 19, 2009 | 802 | ± 3.5% | 45% | 48% | –– | 7% |
| Rasmussen Reports | September 21, 2009 | 500 | ± 4.5% | 46% | 46% | 2% | 5% |
| Public Policy Polling | November 13–15, 2009 | 763 | ± 3.6% | 42% | 43% | –– | 15% |
| Rasmussen Reports | December 15, 2009 | 500 | ± 4.5% | 44% | 46% | 4% | 6% |
| YouGovPolimetrix | January 6–11, 2010 | 500 | –– | 39% | 43% | –– | 19% |
| Rasmussen Reports | January 19, 2010 | 500 | ± 4.5% | 49% | 43% | 3% | 5% |
| Rasmussen Reports | February 10, 2010 | 500 | ± 4.5% | 49% | 42% | 3% | 6% |
| Rasmussen Reports | March 9, 2010 | 500 | ± 4.5% | 47% | 41% | 4% | 8% |
| Public Policy Polling | March 27–28, 2010 | 495 | ± 4.4% | 45% | 41% | –– | 13% |
| Rasmussen Reports | April 6, 2010 | 500 | ± 4.5% | 48% | 42% | 3% | 7% |
| Rasmussen Reports | May 3, 2010 | 500 | ± 4.5% | 50% | 42% | 4% | 4% |
| Rasmussen Reports | June 2, 2010 | 500 | ± 4.5% | 45% | 44% | 4% | 6% |
| Rasmussen Reports | June 28, 2010 | 500 | ± 4.5% | 48% | 43% | 3% | 6% |
| Rasmussen Reports | July 13, 2010 | 750 | ± 4.0% | 47% | 45% | 2% | 6% |
| Mason Dixon | July 19–21, 2010 | 625 | ± 4.0% | 48% | 42% | –– | 10% |
| Rasmussen Reports | July 27, 2010 | 750 | ± 4.0% | 49% | 43% | 4% | 4% |
| Rasmussen Reports | August 10, 2010 | 750 | ± 4.0% | 50% | 43% | 3% | 4% |
| Public Policy Polling | August 14–15, 2010 | –– | ± 3.73% | 45% | 38% | 8% | 9% |
| Rasmussen Reports | August 23, 2010 | 750 | ± 4.0% | 51% | 40% | 5% | 4% |
| Rasmussen Reports | September 7, 2010 | 750 | ± 4.0% | 53% | 43% | 2% | 2% |
| Rasmussen Reports | September 21, 2010 | 750 | ± 4.0% | 52% | 44% | 2% | 3% |
| Fox News/Pulse Opinion Research | October 2, 2010 | 1,000 | ± 3.0% | 50% | 42% | 5% | 3% |
| CNN/Time/Opinion Research | October 1–5, 2010 | 1,398 | ± 2.5% | 53% | 40% | 4% | –– |
| Rasmussen Reports | October 5, 2010 | 750 | ± 4.0% | 51% | 43% | 3% | 2% |
| Fox News/Pulse Opinion Research | October 16, 2010 | 1,000 | ± 3.0% | 49% | 43% | 5% | 3% |
| Public Policy Polling | October 17–18, 2010 | 646 | ± 3.9% | 46% | 41% | 6% | 7% |
| Rasmussen Reports | October 19, 2010 | 750 | ± 4.0% | 52% | 43% | 4% | 3% |
| Mason-Dixon | October 18–20, 2010 | 625 | ± 4.0% | 49% | 40% | 3% | 8% |
| KSN3/Missouri State University | October 20–27, 2010 | 821 | ± 3.8% | 54% | 41% | 3% | 2% |

=== Fundraising ===
| Candidate (party) | Receipts | Disbursements | Cash on hand | Debt |
|---|---|---|---|---|
| Roy Blunt (R) | $8,203,670 | $4,537,049 | $4,003,030 | $0 |
| Robin Carnahan (D) | $7,297,929 | $3,658,278 | $3,639,651 | $0 |
Source: Federal Election Commission

=== Results ===
United States Senate election in Missouri, 2010
| Party | Candidate | Votes | % | ±% |
|---|---|---|---|---|
| Republican | Roy Blunt | 1,054,160 | 54.23% | −1.86% |
| Democratic | Robin Carnahan | 789,736 | 40.63% | −2.17% |
| Libertarian | Jonathan Dine | 58,663 | 3.02% | +2.29% |
| Constitution | Jerry Beck | 41,309 | 2.12% | +1.73% |
| Write-in | | 31 | 0.00% | N/A |
| Total votes | | 1,943,899 | 100.0% | |
| Republican hold | | | | |

== See also ==
- United States Senate elections, 2010
- Missouri state auditor election, 2010
- Missouri Senate elections, 2010
