= Paul Curtman =

American politician (born 1981)

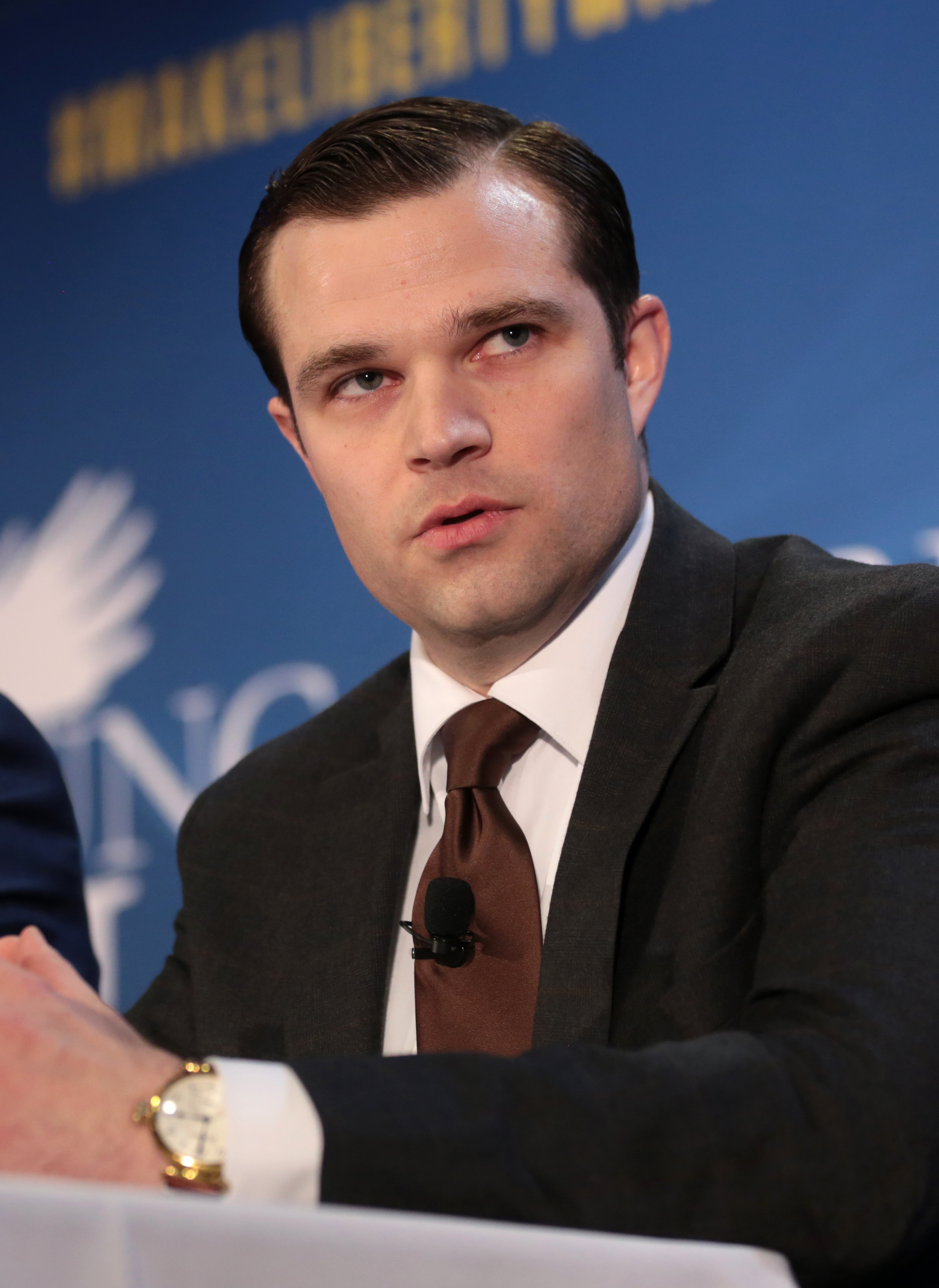

Member of the Missouri House of Representatives
- In office January 9, 2013 – January 9, 2019
- Preceded by: Scott Dieckhaus
- Succeeded by: John Simmons
- Constituency: 109th district
- In office January 5, 2011 – January 9, 2013
- Preceded by: Michael Frame
- Succeeded by: Mark Parkinson
- Constituency: 105th district

Personal details
- Born: April 21, 1981 (age 45) Flint, Michigan, U.S.
- Party: Republican
- Education: University of Missouri–St. Louis (BA)

Military service
- Branch/service: United States Marine Corps
- Years of service: 1999–2009
- Rank: Sergeant
- Unit: 2nd Battalion 3rd Marines; Reserves
- Battles/wars: Operation Enduring Freedom; Global war on terrorism

Paul Curtman (born April 21, 1981) is an American politician who served as a member of the Missouri House of Representatives for the 105th and 109th districts from 2011 to 2019.

== Early life and education ==
Curtman was born to Judith and Dr. Charles Curtman in Flint, Michigan in 1981. He graduated from Pacific High School and joined the United States Marine Corps in 1999. Curtman obtained the rank of sergeant and spent four years on active duty and then six years in the reserves. While in the reserves he obtained a degree in political science from the University of Missouri–St. Louis.

== Career ==
After graduating from college, Curtman became certified as a series 7 investment representative and got a job as a financial advisor at a major investment firm.

Curtman decided to run for the Missouri House of Representatives in 2010. He was unopposed in the Republican primary and faced incumbent representative Michael Frame in the general election. He won with 56.6% of the vote.

On October 24, 2017, Curtman announced he would seek the Republican nomination for state auditor of Missouri in the 2018 election. After leaving office in 2019, Curtman founded the Defense of Liberty PAC, a conservative political action committee.
