= Susan Montee =

American politician

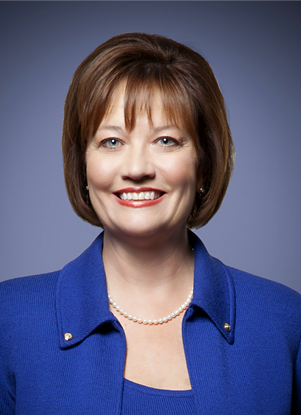

35th Auditor of Missouri
- In office January 4, 2007 – January 10, 2011
- Governor: Matt Blunt; Jay Nixon
- Preceded by: Claire McCaskill
- Succeeded by: Tom Schweich

Buchanan County Auditor
- In office 2001–2007

Personal details
- Born: July 6, 1959 (age 67) St. Joseph, Missouri, U.S.
- Party: Democratic
- Spouse: James Montee (div.)
- Children: Amanda Montee, Andrew Montee, Austin Montee
- Education: Drury College-Springfield
- Profession: CPA, Attorney

Susan Montee (born July 6, 1959) is an American lawyer and politician from the U.S. state of Missouri who served as the 35th State Auditor of Missouri. She won the election in 2006 Missouri State Auditor Election and was sworn into her position on January 4, 2007. She was the third woman in succession to serve as State Auditor of Missouri. She succeeded then-U.S. Senator Claire McCaskill. Montee is a member of the Democratic Party. She was defeated in the 2010 election by Tom Schweich. In 2011 Montee was elected the Chair of the Missouri Democratic Party, which she stepped down from later that year to run for Lieutenant Governor. Susan defeated seven other candidates in the August, 2012 Missouri Democratic Primary for Lieutenant Governor of Missouri. She lost the general election on November 6, 2012 to the Republican incumbent, Peter Kinder.

== Early life and career ==
Montee was born and raised in St. Joseph, Missouri. She graduated from Bishop LeBlond High School. She has an undergraduate degree in accounting from Drury College in Springfield with minors in economics and business administration. Montee became a Certified Public Accountant in 1985. She obtained her J.D. degree from the University of Missouri-Kansas City where she graduated, with distinction, in 2000.

Montee was married 21 years to attorney James Montee before divorcing in 2007. They have three children: Amanda, Andy, and Austin. The family attends Christ Episcopal Church where Susan is one of the highest church officials. Susan Montee is the daughter of Arlene Humphrey of St. Joseph and U.S. Marine Galen Humphrey, Missing-in-Action in Vietnam since 1966. The plane her father was flying on was shot down over the Gulf of Tonkin, off the coast of Vietnam in 1966. Susan also owns Mokaska Coffee Company in St. Joseph Missouri.

== Political career ==
Montee's first elective post was to an at-large four-year term on the St. Joseph City Council in 1998. In 2000, she was elected as Buchanan County Auditor. She served the county for two years concurrently with her service on the City Council. In 2002, Montee was re-elected to a four-year term as County Auditor.

In 2006, Montee sought and won election as the State Auditor of Missouri, defeating Republican Sandra Thomas by a margin of 52.8 to 43.4%. The office was vacated by Claire McCaskill in her win over Jim Talent for the U.S. Senate seat from Missouri. Montee assumed the office four days before her term was scheduled to begin. Former Governor Matt Blunt (R) appointed Montee to fill the brief vacancy created when McCaskill was sworn into the U.S. Senate.

During the Democratic presidential primary of 2008, Montee was an early endorser of Barack Obama for the Democratic nominee for president. While she said she was "moved" by Hillary Rodham Clinton's campaign to become the first woman president, Montee cited Obama's message of unity and hope as the main reason for her endorsement. Obama narrowly won the popular vote by less than 11,000 votes in the Missouri Primary of 2008. Clinton's overwhelming performance in the rural areas of the state, however, led the two candidates to split the state's 72 delegates.

After leaving the office of Missouri State Auditor, Montee became the Chair of the Missouri Democratic Party and has held numerous local positions within the Democratic Party. She is a member of both the Missouri Society of CPAs and the Missouri Association of Trial Attorneys.

In November 2011, Montee stepped down as Chair of the Missouri State Democratic Party to run for Lieutenant Governor of Missouri. On August 7, 2012, she defeated a crowded field of seven other candidates to win the Democratic Primary for Lieutenant Governor of Missouri. She won with 45% of the vote, winning 109 of Missouri's 114 counties. She would face Republican incumbent Peter Kinder in the November general election.

== Electoral history ==
2012 Race for Lieutenant Governor of Missouri
Party	Candidate	Votes	%	±%
Republican	Peter Kinder (inc.)	1,319,747	49.3	−0.6
Democratic	Susan Montee	1,219,457	45.5	−1.8
Libertarian	Matthew Copple	75,169	2.8	+1.0
Constitution	Cynthia Davis	63,594	2.4	+2.4
Majority		100,290	3.74%	−1.14
Total votes		2,677,967	100	-135,931

2010 Race for State Auditor of Missouri
Party	Candidate	Votes	%	±%
Republican	Tom Schweich	974,517	50.8	
Democratic	Susan Montee (incumbent)	871,867	45.5	
Libertarian	Charles W. Baum	70,816	3.7	

2006 Race for State Auditor of Missouri
Party	Candidate	Votes	%	±%
Democratic	Susan Montee	1,091,740	52.94	
Republican	Sandra Thomas	892,473	43.28	
Libertarian	Charles W. Baum	57,185	2.77	
Progressive	Terry Bunker	20,640	1.00	

Party political offices
Preceded by Claire McCaskill	Democratic nominee for State Auditor of Missouri; 2006, 2010	Vacant Title next held by Nicole Galloway
Preceded by Sam Page	Democratic nominee for Lieutenant Governor of Missouri; 2012	Succeeded by Russ Carnahan
Political offices
Preceded by Claire McCaskill	Missouri State Auditor; 2007-2011	Succeeded by Tom Schweich
