= Tom Schweich =

American politician, diplomat and attorney

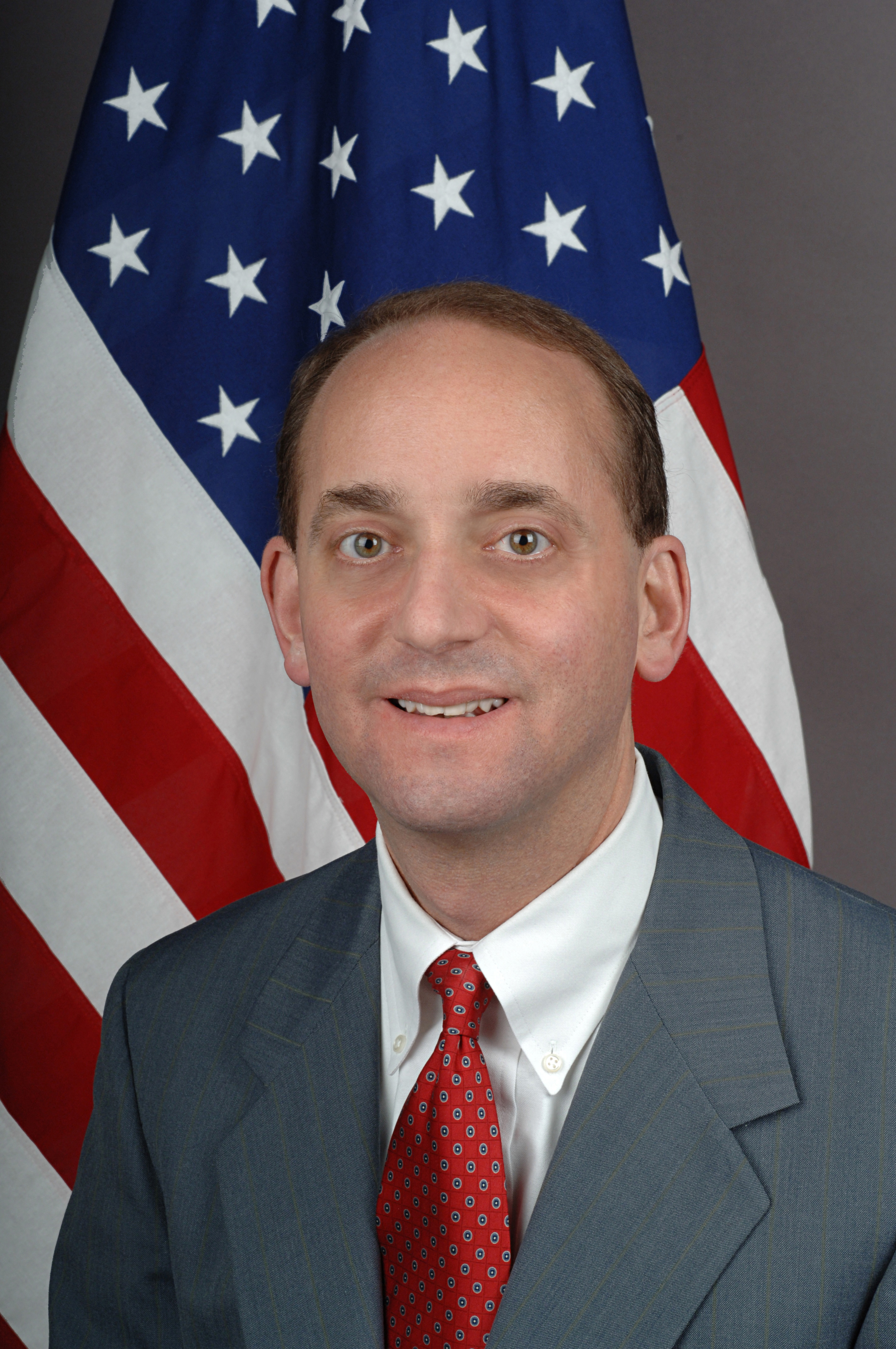

36th Auditor of Missouri
- In office January 10, 2011 – February 26, 2015
- Governor: Jay Nixon
- Preceded by: Susan Montee
- Succeeded by: Nicole Galloway

Personal details
- Born: October 2, 1960 St. Louis, Missouri, U.S.
- Died: February 26, 2015 (aged 54) St. Louis, Missouri, U.S.
- Party: Republican
- Spouse: Kathleen Schweich
- Children: 2
- Education: Yale University (BA); Harvard University (JD)

Thomas A. Schweich (October 2, 1960 – February 26, 2015) was an American politician, diplomat, attorney, and author. A member of the Republican Party, Schweich served as State Auditor of Missouri from 2011 until his death in 2015.

Prior to being elected State Auditor, he served as the U.S. Coordinator for Counternarcotics and Justice Reform in Afghanistan. While in that position, he was given the rank of Ambassador by U.S. President George W. Bush.

In the 2010 election, Schweich was elected State Auditor, defeating Democratic incumbent Susan Montee. He was reelected in 2014 without major-party opposition. In 2015, Schweich announced he would run for Governor of Missouri in the 2016 election. On February 26, 2015, he committed suicide with a firearm.

== Education and legal career ==
Schweich was born in St. Louis, Missouri, the son of Brigitte, who was Christian and Julius Schweich, who was Jewish. He was a fifth generation Missourian and a graduate of Missouri's public school system. Schweich was not Jewish but believed that there was an antisemitic whispering campaign preceding his death which suggested that he was Jewish. One investigative reporter has been unable to determine the authenticity of the claims, and whether or not they were being used for political gain. His paternal grandfather was Jewish. Schweich attended an Episcopal church. Schweich received his undergraduate degree from Yale University, and he obtained his Juris Doctor degree from Harvard Law School. After law school he joined the oldest law firm in Missouri, Bryan Cave. As a partner at Bryan Cave, Schweich specialized in corporate compliance, helping to manage internal audits and investigations for large companies.

== Public service career ==
=== Danforth Special Counsel Investigation into Waco Siege ===
Schweich began his public service career in 1999, when he was named Chief of Staff for former U.S. Senator John Danforth's investigation of the federal government's actions in connection with the 1993 FBI siege of the Branch Davidian compound in Waco, Texas; a siege which resulted in the deaths of over 80 people, including 23 children. The investigation concluded that the Davidians died as a result of a suicide pact, but it also uncovered numerous instances of negligent conduct in the way that the federal government conducted the siege.

=== United Nations ===
John Danforth appointed Schweich to be his chief of staff when he was the United States Ambassador to the United Nations. Schweich also served as chief of staff to the next two ambassadors to the United Nations, Anne W. Patterson and John R. Bolton. During his time serving the United Nations delegation, he helped the delegation uncover the Oil for Food Scandal, a scheme by Saddam Hussein to circumvent United Nations sanctions using bribery and kickbacks to U .N. and other officials.

=== Bush administration ===
In 2005, Schweich became the second-highest ranking and then highest-ranking international law enforcement official in the U.S. State Department as Principal Deputy Assistant Secretary of State and Acting Assistant Secretary of State at the Bureau for International Narcotics and Law Enforcement Affairs. He directed four thousand people located in dozens of countries with a budget of more than 2.5 billion dollars. He was subsequently appointed Coordinator for Counternarcotics and Justice Reform in Afghanistan and was accorded the rank of Ambassador by President George W. Bush.

=== Missouri Auditor ===
In 2010, Schweich sought and won the Republican nomination for Missouri State Auditor, defeating Missouri State Representative Allen Icet with 58.6% of the vote.

In the general election, he faced incumbent and Democratic nominee Susan Montee. Schweich defeated Montee on November 2, 2010, with a 51% to 45% margin of victory.

Schweich made history in the 2014 election when the Democratic party failed to field a candidate against him. The race marked the first time in 144 years that a Republican had run for a Missouri statewide office without any Democratic opposition. Democrats attributed Schweich's implementation of an anti-embezzlement program, rapid response team, and grading system, strong fundraising numbers, and broad bipartisan support of his audits as reasons why he did not draw Democratic opposition for re-election. In the general election, he was re-elected with 73% of the vote to Libertarian Sean O'Toole's 20% and Constitution nominee Rodney Farthing's 7%.

=== 2016 campaign for governor ===
On January 28, 2015, Schweich announced he would run for Governor of Missouri, setting the stage for a Republican primary with former Missouri House Speaker Catherine Hanaway.

== Writing career and personal interests ==
In addition to his public service career, Schweich was an avid numismatist and a collector of movie memorabilia.

He wrote three books and numerous articles on topics including business law, numismatic history and international relations. Accolades for his work include three literary awards from the American Numismatic Association. He wrote his first book, Protect Yourself From Business Lawsuits (…and Lawyers Like Me) (Simon & Schuster), in 1998, and it became the best selling business law book on Amazon.com. He wrote his second book, Crashproof Your Life: A Comprehensive Three-Part Plan for Avoiding Financial Disasters (McGraw-Hill), in 2002. He wrote his third book, Staying Power (McGraw-Hill), in 2003. In addition, he recorded an audio series on personal finance entitled "Protect Your Wealth," which was released in 2004.

Before becoming state auditor, Schweich taught law and foreign policy at Washington University School of Law.

== Death and aftermath ==
On February 26, 2015, Schweich was taken from his home to a St. Louis hospital for treatment of a gunshot wound, later ruled to be self-inflicted. His office soon confirmed that he had died. Governor Jay Nixon decreed that flags would be flown at half-staff in his memory.

In early March 2015, an aide to former U.S. Senator Danforth, Martha Fitz, told a reporter with the Kansas City Star that she had spoken with Schweich by phone only minutes before his suicide, and that he expressed to her frustration and outrage over what he described as a "whisper campaign" by some Republicans to spread false information about him and damage his gubernatorial campaign. Fitz was talking with Schweich's wife, who had initiated the call, when the fatal shot was fired.

However, after a thorough investigation, police found no evidence of a whisper campaign against Schweich. Instead, after interviews with family, it was revealed that Schweich had threatened suicide several times over many years, sometimes while holding a gun. Also, officers found 23 different prescription medications at Schweich’s house he had been taking for various illnesses and diseases.

Some prominent state figures openly cast blame on the Republicans, particularly their campaign manager Jeff Roe, for willfully growing a "toxic campaign culture". The ad that aired early in the campaign mocked Schweich for his physical appearance and called him a "little bug".

During Schweich's eulogy at a memorial service on March 3, 2015, former U.S. Senator John Danforth said that words used by others to describe Schweich constituted "bullying" and contributed to his death. "Politics", he said, "has gone so hideously wrong."

The Clayton Police Department conducted an investigation into Schweich's death by conducting interviews and searching through his electronic devices to examine his texts, emails, and voice mails. They found no evidence of the alleged whisper campaign and found no evidence that Schweich was the target of bullying, threats, or blackmail.

On March 29, 2015, Robert "Spence" Jackson, 44, the spokesman for the Missouri State Auditor's office since October 2011, was found dead at his home in Jefferson City of a gunshot wound, an apparent suicide. Jackson's note read only "I'm so sorry. I just can't take being unemployed again". Police spokesman Doug Shoemaker said investigators wouldn't speculate concerning any connection to Schweich's death "or really entertain questions that might link Mr. Jackson to any type of political issue, whether it's perceived or real".

Following Schweich's death, Governor Jay Nixon appointed John Watson as Acting State Auditor, and subsequently appointed Boone County Treasurer Nicole Galloway to serve as State Auditor until the 2018 election.

== Electoral history ==
2010 Missouri state auditor election
Party	Candidate	Votes	%	±%
Republican	Tom Schweich	974,517	50.8%	+7.5
Democratic	Susan Montee (incumbent)	871,867	45.5%	−7.4
Libertarian	Charles W. Baum	70,816	3.7%	+0.9

2014 Missouri state auditor election
Party	Candidate	Votes	%	±%
Republican	Tom Schweich	937,961	73.3%	+22.5
Libertarian	Sean O'Toole	252,351	19.7%	+16.0
Constitution	Rodney Farthing	89,080	7.0%	+7.0

Party political offices
Preceded by Sandra Thomas	Republican nominee for State Auditor of Missouri; 2010, 2014	Succeeded by Saundra McDowell
Political offices
Preceded by Susan Montee	Auditor of Missouri; 2011–2015	Succeeded by Nicole Galloway
