= Charles W. Shields =

American politician

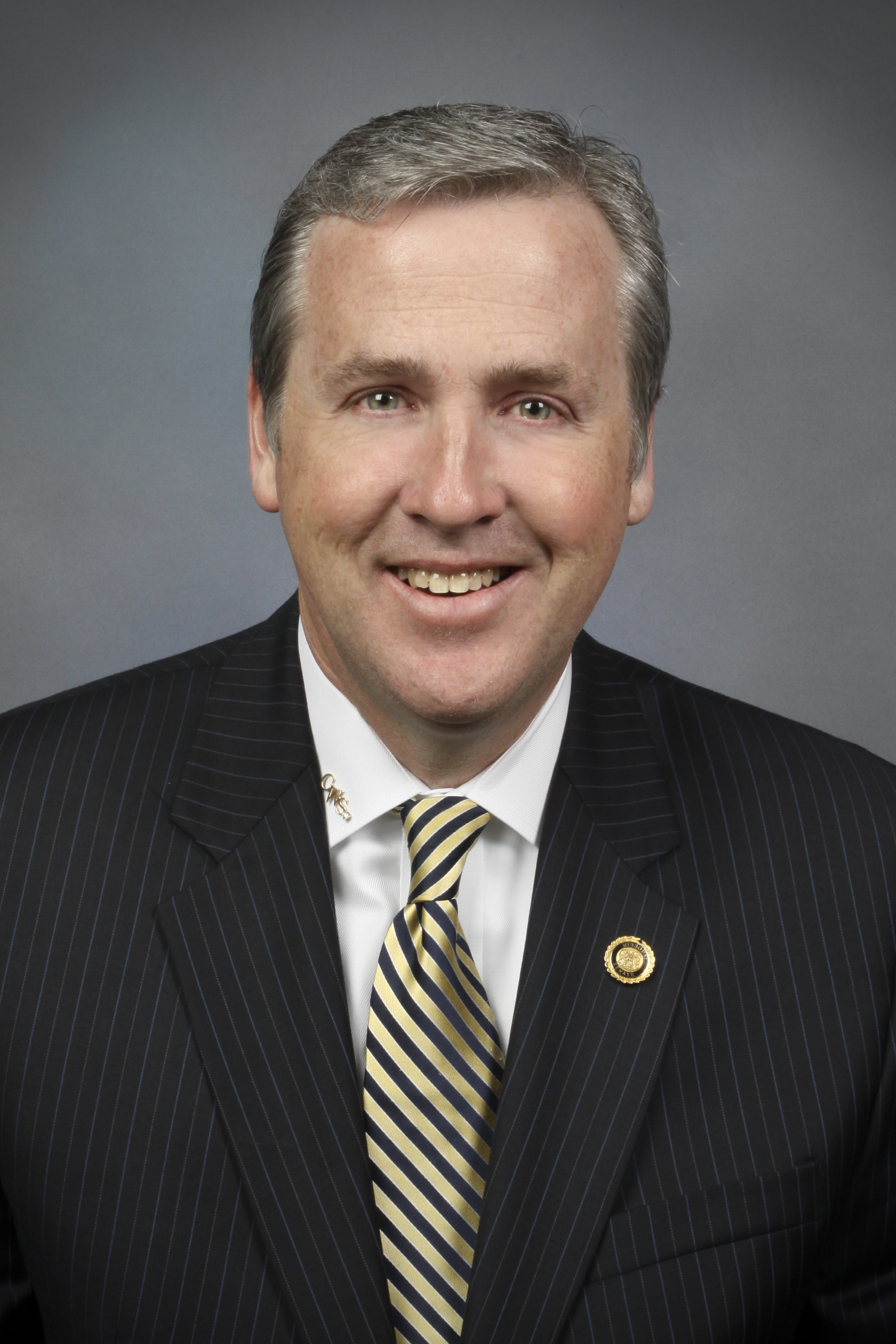

Member of the Missouri Senate from the 34th district
- In office 2002 - 2010

Personal details
- Born: July 25, 1959 (age 66) Kansas City, Missouri
- Party: Republican
- Spouse: Brenda Kay Brandt

Charles W. Shields is a former Republican member of the Missouri Senate, representing the 34th District from 2002 until 2010. He last served as the President Pro Tem. Previously he was a member of the Missouri House of Representatives from 1991 until 2002.

He was born in Kansas City, Missouri. He holds a bachelor's in marketing and an M.B.A. from the University of Missouri. In 1990 he was elected to his first term in the Missouri House of Representatives, where her served continuously through 2002. Beginning in 1996, he also served as the party's House Minority Whip. He was first elected to the Missouri State Senate in 2002, and last served on the following committees:

- Rules, Joint Rules, Resolutions and Ethics (chair)
- Administration (vice chair)
- Gubernatorial Appointments (vice chair)
- Education.

He is currently Chief Executive Officer of the Truman Medical Centers. Shields lives in St. Joseph, Missouri with his wife, Brenda Kay Brandt. He is a member of Brookdale Presbyterian Church, the Eastside Lions (where he had earlier served as president), is assistant Scoutmaster of Troop 216 and a member of the Tribe of Mic-O-Say, the United Way application committee, Northwest Missouri AHEC board. He is also a member of Moila Shrine Temple, the Missouri Cultural Trust Board, the Missouri Commission on the Future of Higher Education, and the Missouri National Guard Association.
