= State Auditor of Missouri =

- Seal of the State Auditor of Missouri

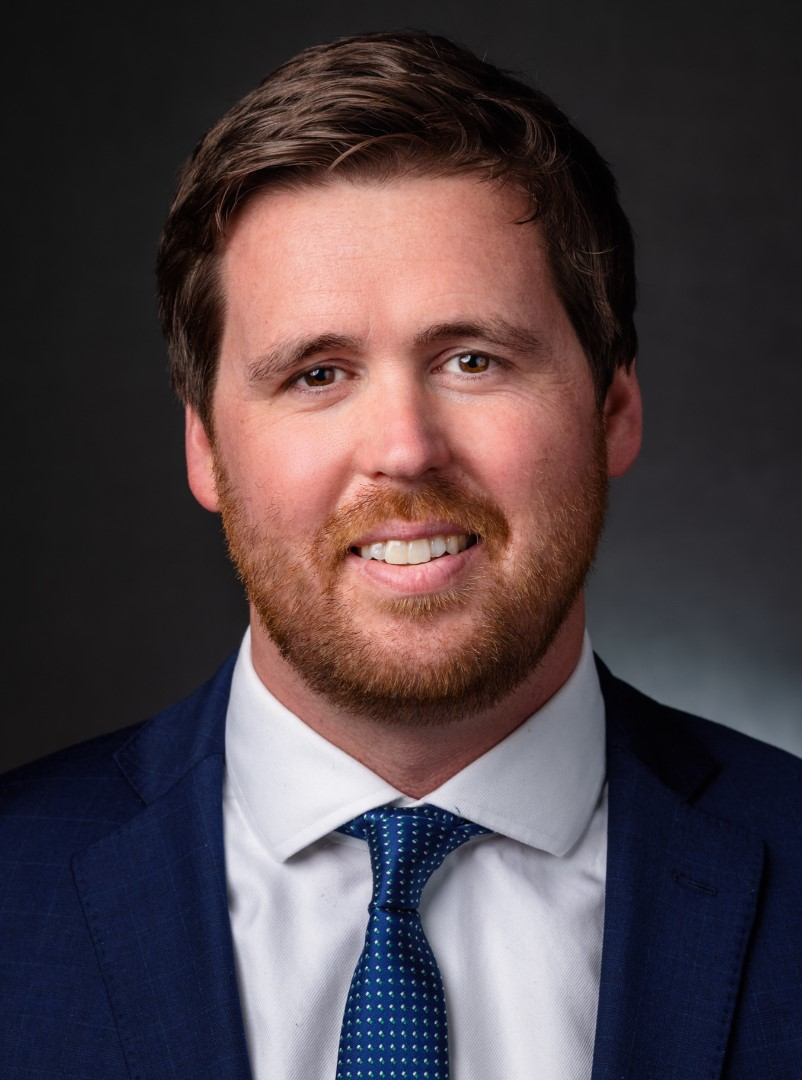
- Incumbent; Scott Fitzpatrick since January 9, 2023
- Type: State Auditor
- Term length: 4 years, no term limit
- Formation: 1820
- First holder: William Christy
- Succession: Fifth
- Website: Missouri State Auditor's Office Website

The state auditor of Missouri is an elected constitutional officer in the executive branch of government of the U.S. state of Missouri. Thirty-eight individuals have occupied the office of state auditor since statehood. The incumbent is Scott Fitzpatrick, a Republican.

== Election and qualification ==
The state auditor serves a four-year term, and is the only state executive branch official elected in even-numbered non-presidential election years. To be eligible for the office of state auditor, a candidate must meet the same eligibility requirements prescribed for the governor.

== Powers and duties ==
The state auditor is charged by Article IV, Section 13 of the Missouri Constitution with supervising and auditing the receipt and expenditure of public funds and prescribing appropriate systems of accounts for all public offices, be they state agencies or local governments. In relation to the aforesaid local governments, the same constitutional provisions also require the state auditor to supervise their budgeting systems. In accordance with this mandate, the state auditor conducts financial and performance audits for approximately 200 state agencies, boards, and commissions, and the state's judicial branch. The state auditor also audits counties, cities, school districts, and other political subdivisions at the auditor's initiative, whenever they lack an external auditor, or when requested by citizen petition.

Missouri's state auditor is one of only four elected auditors in the United States whose core responsibilities are codified in the state constitution. The other state auditors to which this phenomenon applies are the auditors in New York, Utah, and Washington.

== Recent history ==
The office was temporarily held by John Watson after Tom Schweich, who was elected in 2010 and reelected in 2014, died on February 26, 2015. Nicole Galloway was appointed by Governor Jay Nixon to fill the office on a permanent basis until the 2018 election, effective on April 27, 2015, and was subsequently elected to a full term. Scott Fitzpatrick was elected as State Auditor in 2022, and took office on January 9, 2023.

== List of State Auditors of Missouri ==
#	Image	Name	Party	Term	County
1		William Christy	Democratic-Republican	1820–1821	St. Louis
2		William V. Rector	Democratic-Republican	1821–1823	St. Louis, MO
3		Elias Barcroft	Democratic-Republican	1823–1833	St. Louis
4		Henry Shurlds	Democratic	1833–1835	Washington
5		Peter Garland Glover	Democratic	1835–1837	Callaway
6		Hiram H. Baber	Democratic	1837–1845	Cole
7		William Monroe	Democratic	1845	Morgan
8		James W. McDearmon	Democratic	1845–1848	St. Charles
9		George W. Miller	Democratic	1848–1849	Cole
10		Wilson Brown	Democratic	1849–1852	Cape Girardeau
11		Abraham Fulkerson	Democratic	1852	Cole
12		William H. Buffington	Democratic	1853–1861	Cole
13		W. S. Moseley	Democratic	1861–1865	New Madrid
14		Alonzo Thompson	Republican	1865–1869	Nodaway
15		Daniel Draper	Republican	1869–1873	Montgomery
16		George Boardman Clark	Democratic	1873–1875	Washington
17		Thomas Holloday	Democratic	1875–1881	Madison
18		John Walker	Democratic	1881–1889	Howard
19		James Monroe Seibert	Democratic	1889–1901	Cape Girardeau
20		Albert Otis Allen	Democratic	1901–1905	New Madrid
21		William Werner Wilder	Republican	1905–1909	Ste. Genevieve
22		John Pemberton Gordon	Democratic	1909–1917	Lafayette
23		George Ernst Hackman	Republican	1917–1925	Warren
24		Lorenzo Dow Thompson	Republican	1925–1933	Callaway
25		Forrest Smith	Democratic	1933–1949	Ray
26		W. H. Holmes	Democratic	1949–1953	Maries
27		Haskell Holman	Democratic	1953–1971	Randolph
28		Kit Bond	Republican	1971–1973	Audrain
29		John Ashcroft	Republican	1973–1975	Greene
30		George W. Lehr	Democratic	1975–1977	Jackson
31		Thomas M. Keyes	Democratic	1977–1978	Jackson
32		James Antonio	Republican	1978–1984	Cole
33		Margaret B. Kelly	Republican	1984–1999	Cole
34		Claire McCaskill	Democratic	1999–2007	Jackson
35		Susan Montee	Democratic	2007–2011	Buchanan
36		Tom Schweich	Republican	2011–2015	St. Louis
37		John Watson	Democratic	2015	Cole
38		Nicole Galloway	Democratic	2015–2023	Boone
39		Scott Fitzpatrick	Republican	2023–present	
