= 2024 United States state treasurer elections =

- November 5, 2024

10 state treasurer offices (Note: Seat tallies and popular vote do not include states that do not elect state treasurers or territorial state treasurers.)
	Majority party	Minority party
Party	Republican	Democratic
Seats before	25	12
Seats after	25	12
Seat change	Steady	Steady
Popular vote	11,450,644	8,665,665
Percentage	56.90%	43.06%
Seats up	7	3
Seats won	7	3
- Democratic hold Republican hold No election

The 2024 United States state treasurer elections were held on November 5, 2024, to elect the state treasurer and equivalents in nine states, plus a special election in Arkansas. The previous elections for this group of states took place in 2020. The treasurer of Vermont serves two-year terms and was last elected in 2022.

These elections took place concurrently with several other federal, state, and local elections.

== Partisan composition ==
Going into these elections, this class of treasurers was made up of 7 Republicans and 3 Democrats. Republicans were defending one state won by Joe Biden in 2020 (Pennsylvania), while Democrats did not hold any states won by Donald Trump.

== Race summary ==
State	State Treasurer	Party	First elected	Status	Candidates
Arkansas	Larry Walther	Republican	2023 (appointed)	Interim appointee term-limited (Note: The Arkansas State Constitution prohibits appointees from running for re-election.); Republican hold.	▌ ✓ John Thurston (Republican) 65.37%; ▌John Pagan (Democratic) 30.32%; ▌Michael Pakko (Libertarian) 4.31%
Missouri	Vivek Malek	Republican	2023 (appointed)	Incumbent elected to full term.	▌ ✓ Vivek Malek (Republican) 57.93%; ▌Mark Osmack (Democratic) 38.04%; ▌John Hartwig (Libertarian) 2.80%
North Carolina	Dale Folwell	Republican	2016	Incumbent retired to run for governor Republican hold.	▌ ✓ Brad Briner (Republican) 52.45%; ▌Wesley Harris (Democratic) 47.55%
North Dakota	Thomas Beadle	Republican	2020	Incumbent re-elected.	▌ ✓ Thomas Beadle (Republican) 98.08%
Oregon	Tobias Read	Democratic	2016	Incumbent term-limited. Democratic hold.	▌ ✓ Elizabeth Steiner (Democratic) 49.36%; ▌Brian Boquist (Republican) 43.24%
Pennsylvania	Stacy Garrity	Republican	2020	Incumbent re-elected.	▌ ✓ Stacy Garrity (Republican) 51.91%; ▌Erin McClelland (Democratic) 45.65%; ▌Nick Ciesielski (Libertarian) 1.45%
Utah	Marlo Oaks	Republican	2022	Incumbent re-elected.	▌ ✓ Marlo Oaks (Republican) 64.94%; ▌Neil Hansen (Democratic) 29.68%; ▌Miles Pomeroy (Forward) 5.38%
Vermont	Mike Pieciak	Democratic	2022	Incumbent re-elected.	▌ ✓ Mike Pieciak (Democratic) 60.79%; ▌Joshua Bechhoefer (Republican) 39.09%
Washington	Mike Pellicciotti	Democratic	2020	Incumbent re-elected.	▌ ✓ Mike Pellicciotti (Democratic) 57.26%; ▌Sharon Hanek (Republican) 42.65%
West Virginia	Riley Moore	Republican	2020	Incumbent retired to run for U.S. House. Republican hold.	▌ ✓ Larry Pack (Republican) 99.93%

== Closest races ==
States where the margin of victory was under 10%:

1. North Carolina, 4.9%
2. Oregon, 6.12%
3. Pennsylvania, 6.26%

Blue denotes races won by Democrats. Red denotes races won by Republicans.

== Arkansas (special) ==
Arkansas State Treasurer special election
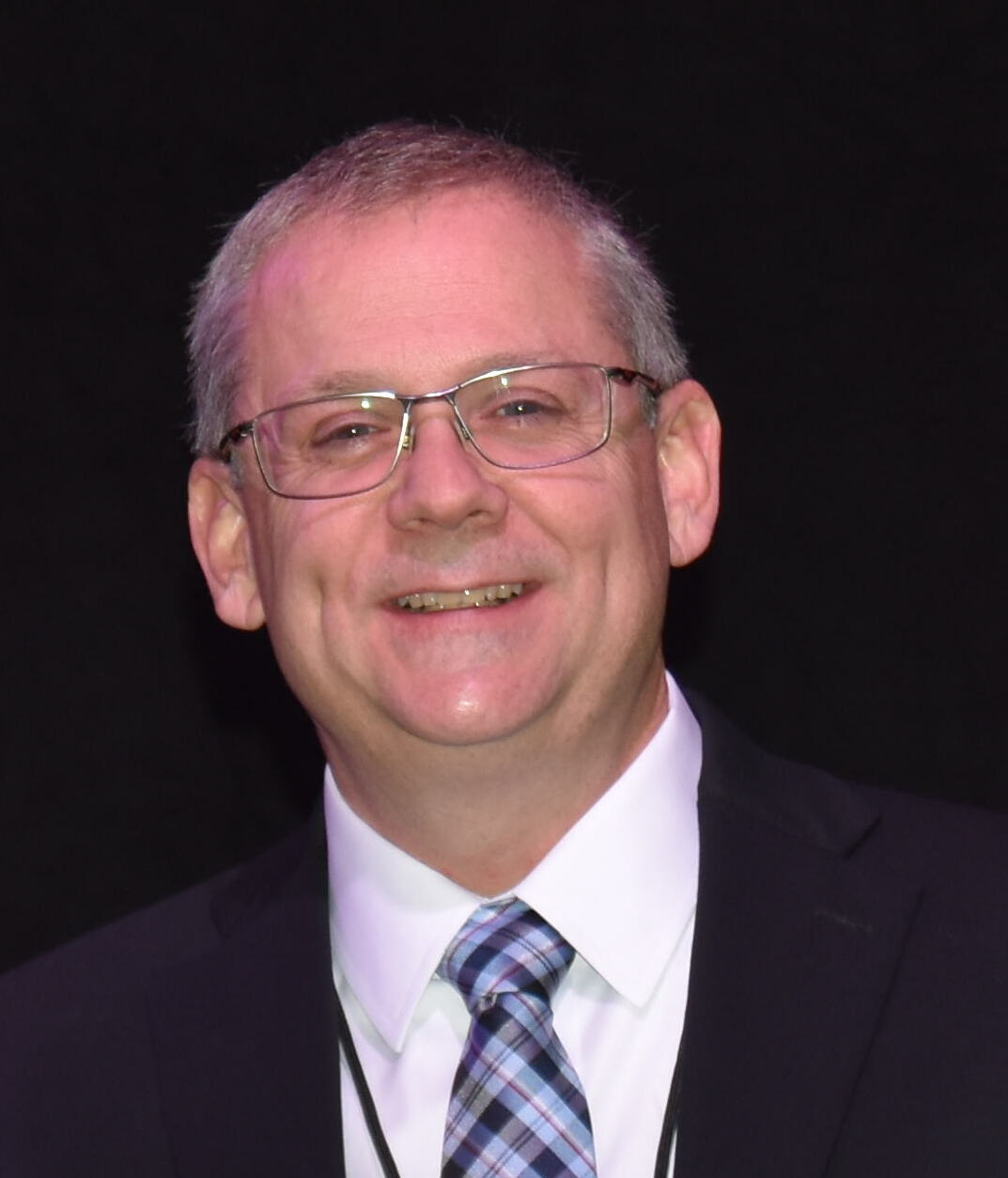

Nominee	John Thurston	John Pagan
Party	Republican	Democratic
Popular vote	755,156	350,210
Percentage	65.37%	30.32%
- County results Thurston: 40–50% 50–60% 60–70% 70–80% 80–90% Pagan: 50–60% Tie: 40–50%
State Treasurer before election
Larry Walther
Republican
Elected State Treasurer
John Thurston
Republican

Incumbent Republican Treasurer Larry Walther was appointed by Governor Sarah Huckabee Sanders after the death of Mark Lowery. Walther cannot run for re-election per the state constitution.

Republican Secretary of State John Thurston and Democrat John Pagan the both won their respective nominations unopposed

== Missouri ==
Missouri State Treasurer election
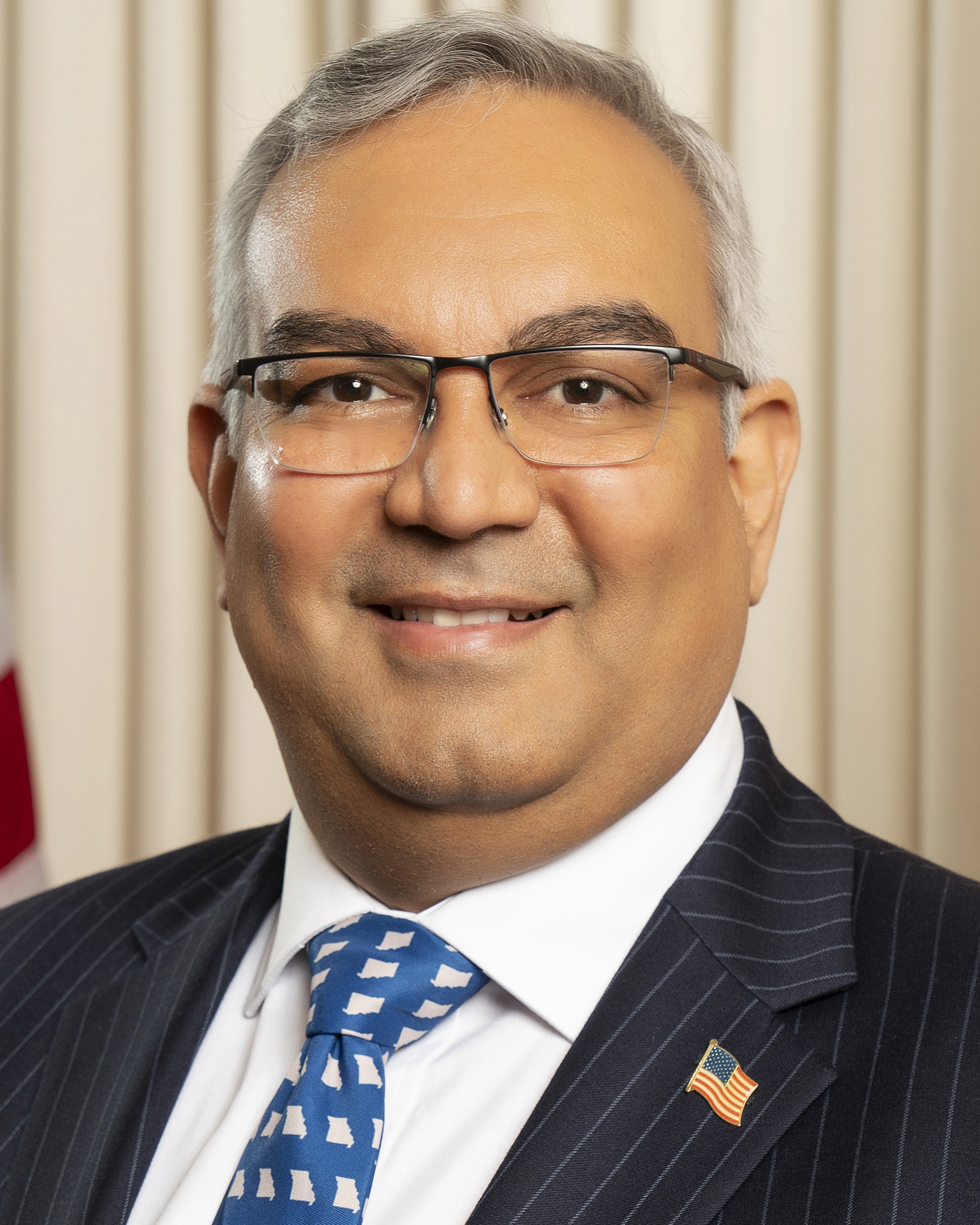

Nominee	Vivek Malek	Mark Osmack
Party	Republican	Democratic
Popular vote	1,684,714	1,106,236
Percentage	57.93%	38.04%
- County results Malek: 50–60% 60–70% 70–80% 80–90% Osmack: 40–50% 50–60% 70–80%
State Treasurer before election
Vivek Malek
Republican
Elected State Treasurer
Vivek Malek
Republican

Incumbent Republican Treasurer Vivek Malek was appointed by Governor Mike Parson after Scott Fitzpatrick resigned after successfully running for state auditor. Malek is running for a full term. Challenging him in the Republican primary are state senator Andrew Koenig, state representative Cody Smith and attorney Lori Rook.

Financial advisor Lucas Johnson is the lone Democratic candidate as of February 2024.

== North Carolina ==
North Carolina State Treasurer election
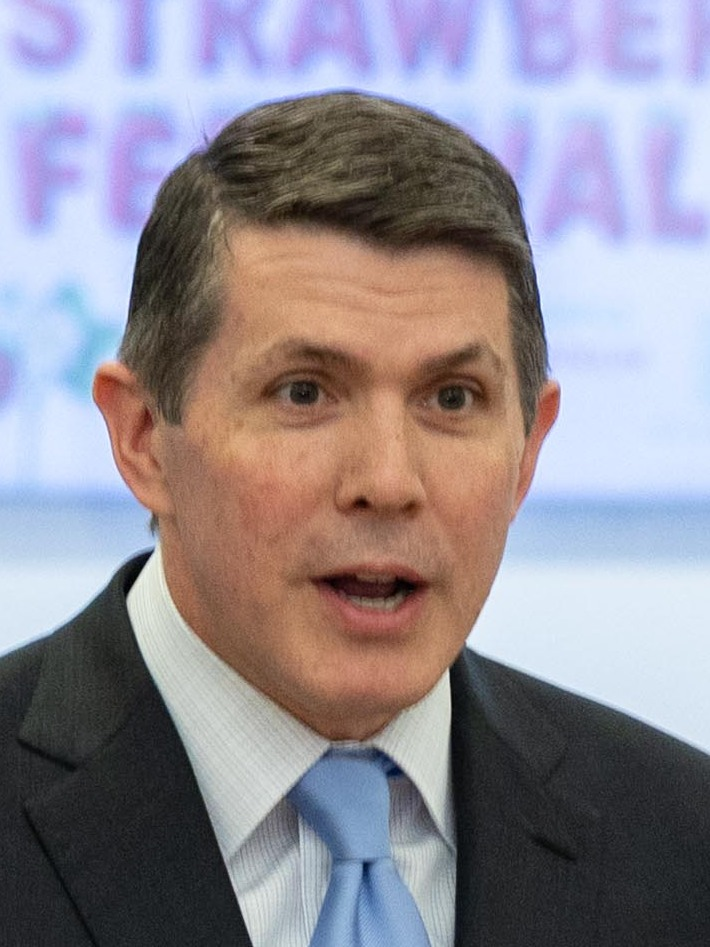

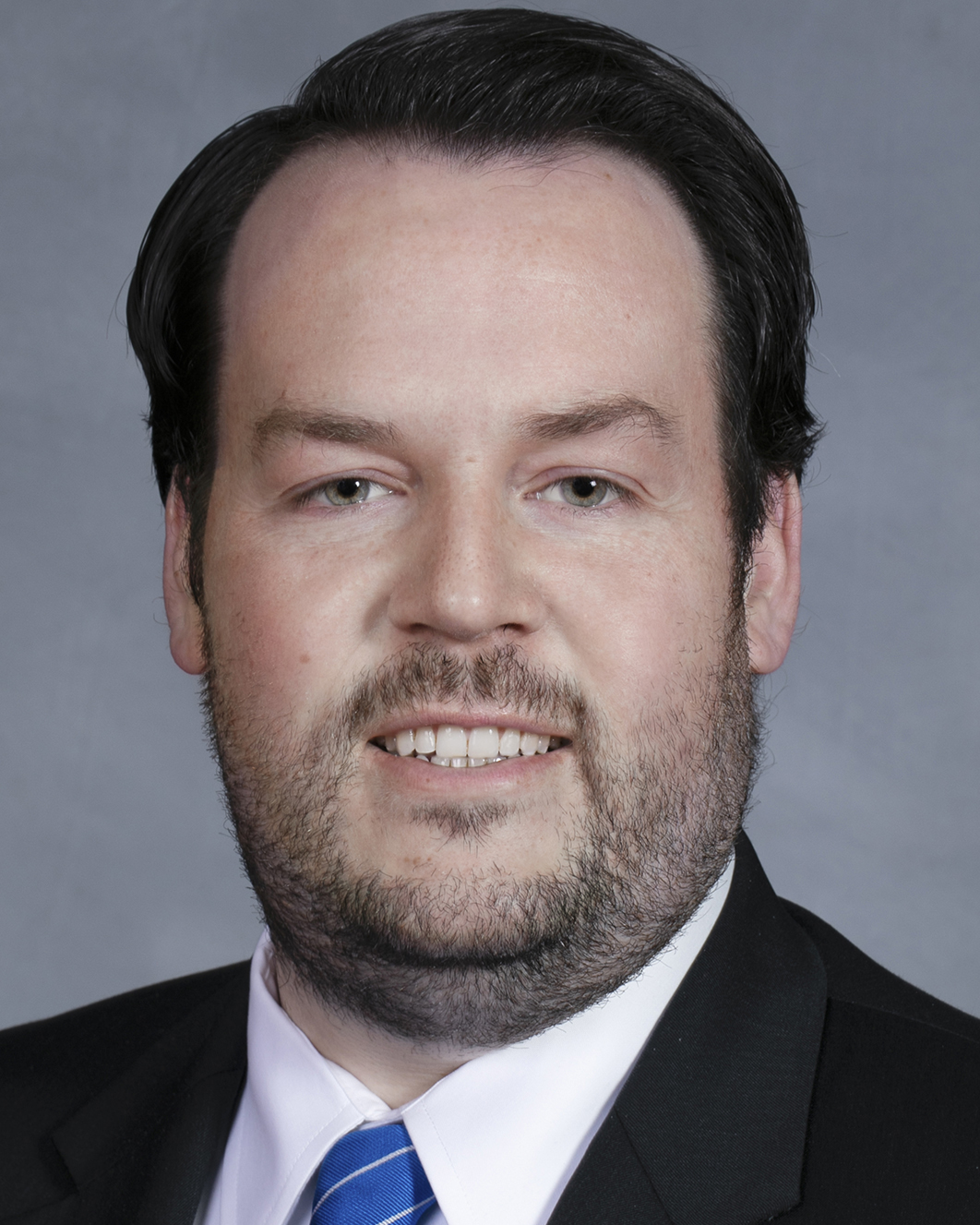
Nominee	Brad Briner	Wesley Harris
Party	Republican	Democratic
Popular vote	2,900,059	2,629,444
Percentage	52.45%	47.55%
- County results Briner: 50–60% 60–70% 70–80% 80–90% Harris: 50–60% 60–70% 70–80%
State Treasurer before election
Dale Folwell
Republican
Elected State Treasurer
Brad Briner
Republican

Incumbent Republican Dale Folwell was eligible to serve a third term, but has instead decided to run for governor.

Michael Bloomberg's investment manager Brad Briner won the Republican nomination defeating former North Carolina Education Lottery commissioner A.J. Daoud and Rachel Johnson.

State representative Wesley Harris won the Democratic nomination defeating Small Business Administration employee Gabe Esparza

== North Dakota ==
North Dakota State Treasurer election
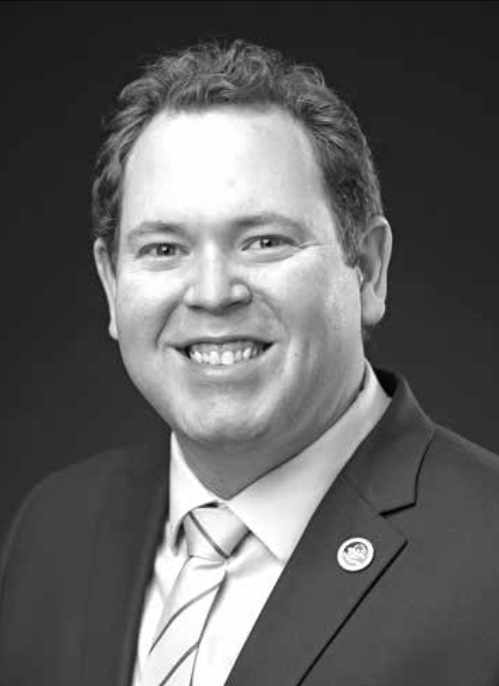
Nominee	Thomas Beadle
Party	Republican
Popular vote	303,730
Percentage	98.08%
- County results Beadle: >90%
State Treasurer before election
Thomas Beadle
Republican
Elected State Treasurer
Thomas Beadle
Republican

Incumbent Republican Thomas Beadle is running for re-election to a second term.

== Oregon ==
Oregon State Treasurer election
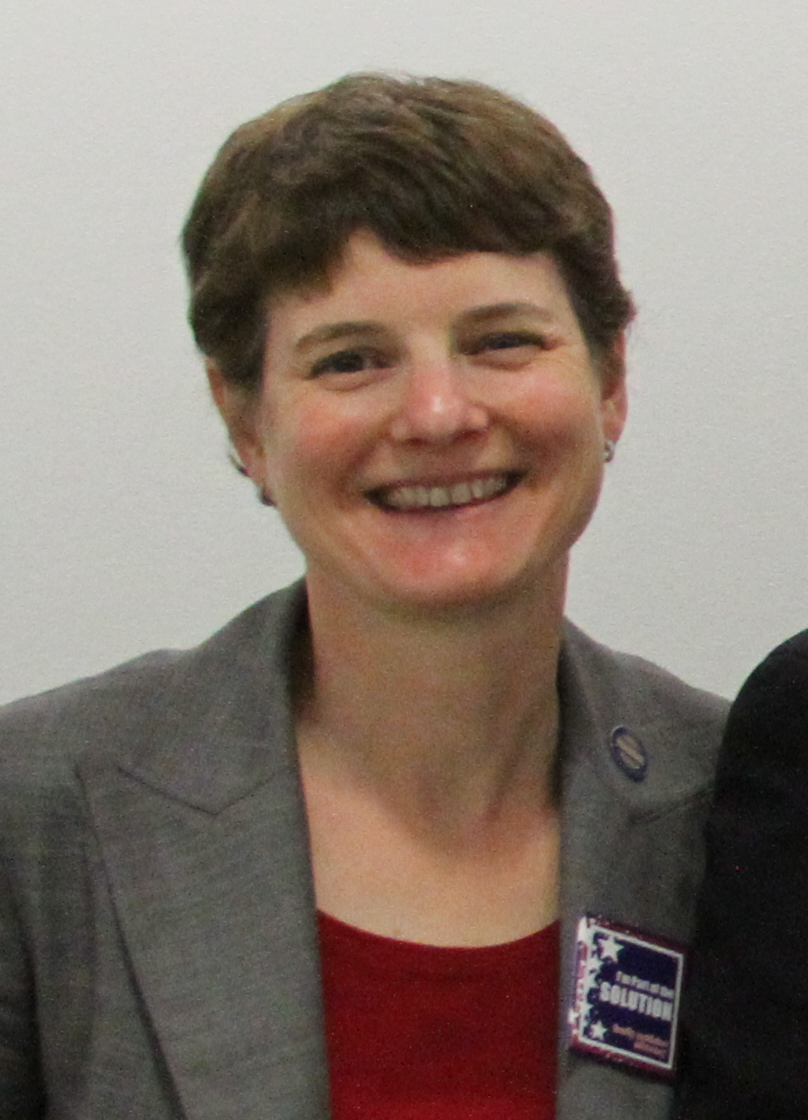

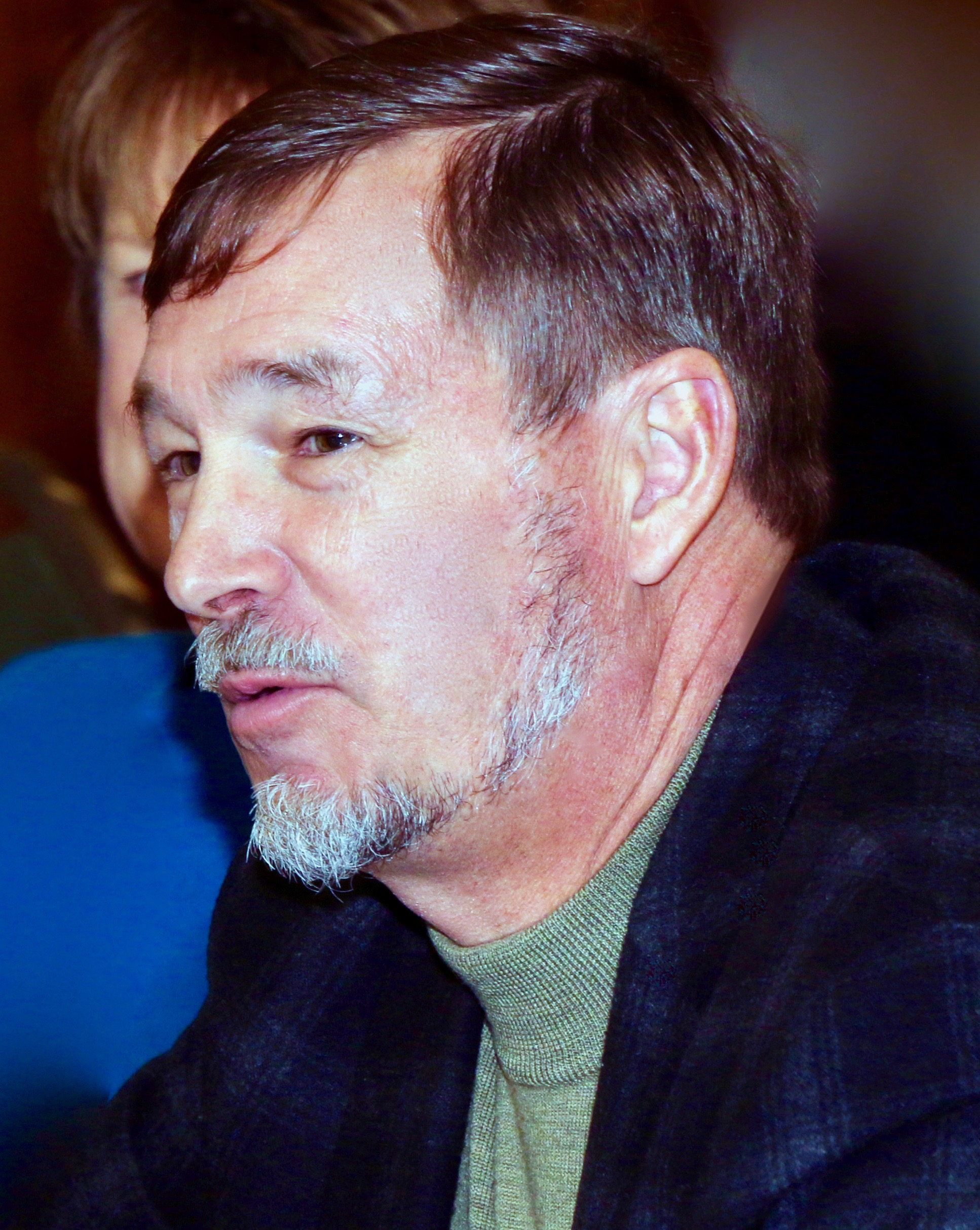

Candidate	Elizabeth Steiner	Brian Boquist	Mary King
Party	Democratic	Republican	Working Families
Popular vote	1,050,119	919,794	155,473
Percentage	49.36%	43.24%	7.31%
- County results Steiner: 40–50% 50–60% 60–70% 70–80% 80–90% Boquist: 50–60% 60–70% 70–80% 80–90%
State Treasurer before election
Tobias Read
Democratic
Elected State Treasurer
Elizabeth Steiner
Democratic

Incumbent Democrat Tobias Reed was eligible to serve a third term, but has instead decided to run for secretary of state.

Democratic candidates include nonprofit executive Brett Baker, Republican nominee for this position in 2016 and 2020 Jeff Gudnam, and state senator Elizabeth Steiner.

== Pennsylvania ==
Pennsylvania State Treasurer election
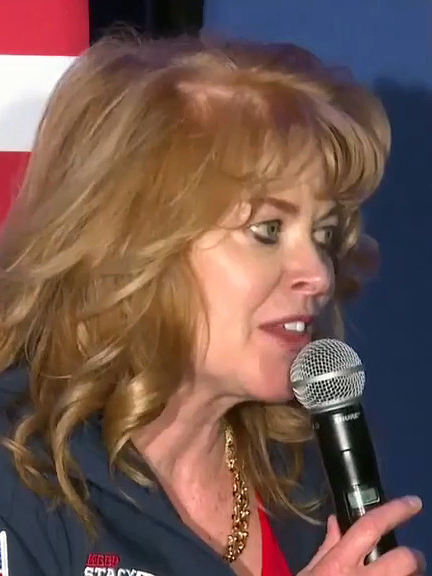

Nominee	Stacy Garrity	Erin McClelland
Party	Republican	Democratic
Popular vote	3,542,336	3,115,393
Percentage	51.91%	45.65%
- County results Garrity: 40–50% 50–60% 60–70% 70–80% 80–90% McClelland: 50–60% 70–80%
State Treasurer before election
Stacy Garrity
Republican
Elected State Treasurer
Stacy Garrity
Republican

Incumbent Republican Stacy Garrity is running for a second term. Challenging her is psychologist and 2014 and 2016 12th congressional district Democratic nominee Erin McClelland who won the Democratic nomination defeating state representative Ryan Bizzarro.

== Utah ==
Utah State Treasurer election
Nominee	Marlo Oaks	Neil Hansen	Miles Pomeroy
Party	Republican	Democratic	Forward
Popular vote	920,760	420,883	76,212
Percentage	64.94%	29.68%	5.38%
- County results Oaks: 40–50% 50–60% 60–70% 70–80% 80–90% >90% Hansen: 40–50%
State Treasurer before election
Marlo Oaks
Republican
Elected State Treasurer
Marlo Oaks
Republican

Incumbent Republican Marlo Oaks is running for a full term. Challenging him are Democratic candidate former state representative Neil Hansen and Forward Party candidate Miles Pomeroy.

== Vermont ==
Vermont State Treasurer election
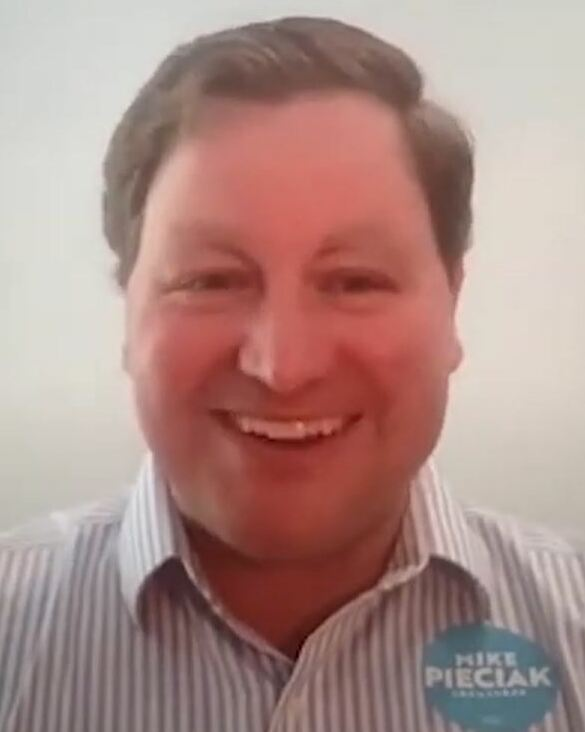

Nominee	Mike Pieciak	Joshua Bechhoefer
Party	Democratic	Republican
Popular vote	211,134	135,763
Percentage	60.79%	39.09%
- Pieciak: 50–60% 60–70% 70–80% 80–90% Bechhoefer: 50–60% 60–70% 70–80% Tie: 40–50%
State Treasurer before election
Mike Pieciak
Democratic
Elected State Treasurer
Mike Pieciak
Democratic

Incumbent Democrat Mike Pieciak is running for a second term.

== Washington ==
Washington State Treasurer election
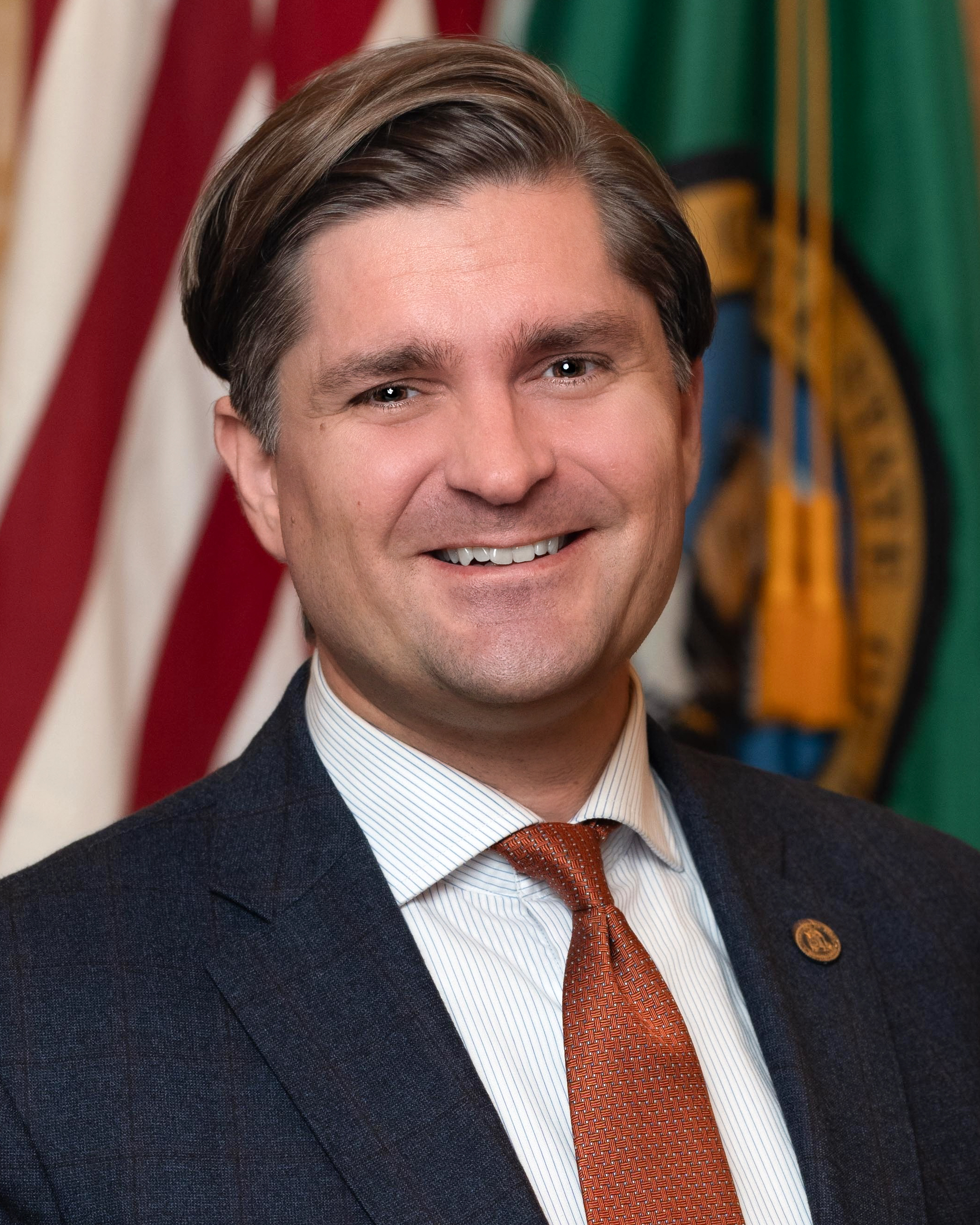

Nominee	Mike Pellicciotti	Sharon Hanek
Party	Democratic	Republican
Popular vote	2,148,764	1,600,370
Percentage	57.26%	42.65%
- County results Pellicciotti: 50–60% 60–70% 70–80% Hanek: 50–60% 60–70% 70–80%
State Treasurer before election
Mike Pellicciotti
Democratic
Elected State Treasurer
Mike Pellicciotti
Democratic

Incumbent Democrat Mike Pellicciotti is running for a second term.

== West Virginia ==
West Virginia State Treasurer election
Nominee	Larry Pack
Party	Republican
Popular vote	602,718
Percentage	99.93%
- County results Pack: >90%
State Treasurer before election
Riley Moore
Republican
Elected State Treasurer
Larry Pack
Republican

Incumbent Republican Riley Moore was eligible to run for a second term, but instead decided to run for U.S. House.

Republican acting West Virginia Secretary of Revenue Larry Pack is the only candidate to file for the position.
