= 2028 United States state treasurer elections =

- November 7, 2028

9 state treasurer offices (Note: Seat tallies and popular vote do not include states that do not elect state treasurers or territorial state treasurers.)
	Majority party	Minority party
Party	Republican	Democratic
- Democratic incumbent Republican incumbent Term-limited Republican; No election

The 2028 United States state treasurer elections are scheduled to be held on November 7, 2028. The previous elections for this group of states took place in 2024.

These elections will be held concurrently with several other federal, state, and local elections.

== Race summary ==
State	State Treasurer	Party	First elected	Last race	Status	Candidates
Missouri	Vivek Malek	Republican	2023 (appointed)	57.9% R	Incumbent's intent unknown	TBD
North Carolina	Brad Briner	Republican	2024	52.4% R	Incumbent's intent unknown	TBD
North Dakota	Thomas Beadle	Republican	2020	98.1% R	Incumbent's intent unknown	TBD
Oregon	Elizabeth Steiner	Democratic	2024	49.4% D	Incumbent's intent unknown	TBD
Pennsylvania	Stacy Garrity	Republican	2020	51.9% R	Term-limited	TBD
Utah	Marlo Oaks	Republican	2022 (special)	64.9% R	Incumbent's intent unknown	TBD
Vermont	Mike Pieciak	Democratic	2022	62.3% D	Incumbent's intent unknown	TBD
Washington	Mike Pellicciotti	Democratic	2020	57.3% D	Incumbent's intent unknown	TBD
West Virginia	Larry Pack	Republican	2024	99.9% R	Incumbent's intent unknown	TBD

== Missouri ==
State Treasurer Vivek Malek was elected in 2024 with 57.9% of the vote. He is eligible to run for re-election but has not yet stated if he will do so.

== North Carolina ==
State Treasurer Brad Briner was elected in 2024 with 52.4% of the vote. He is eligible to run for re-election but has not yet stated if he will do so.

== North Dakota ==
State Treasurer Thomas Beadle was re-elected in 2024 with 98.1% of the vote. He is eligible to run for re-election but has not yet stated if he will do so.

== Oregon ==
State Treasurer Elizabeth Steiner was elected in 2024 with 49.4% of the vote. She is eligible to run for re-election but has not yet stated if she will do so.

== Pennsylvania ==
State Treasurer Stacy Garrity was re-elected in 2024 with 51.9% of the vote. She is term-limited and ineligible to run for re-election.

== Utah ==
State Treasurer Marlo Oaks was re-elected in 2024 with 64.9% of the vote. He is eligible to run for re-election but has not yet stated if he will do so.

== Vermont ==
State Treasurer Mike Pieciak was re-elected in 2026 with 62.3% of the vote. He is eligible to run for re-election but has not yet stated if he will do so.

== Washington ==
State Treasurer Mike Pellicciotti was re-elected in 2024 with 57.3% of the vote. He is eligible to run for re-election but has not yet stated if he will do so.

== West Virginia ==
State Treasurer Larry Pack was elected in 2024 with 99.9% of the vote. He is eligible to run for re-election but has not yet stated if he will do so.

== See also ==
- 2028 United States elections
