= 2020 United States state treasurer elections =

- November 3, 2020

9 state treasurer offices (Note: Seat tallies and popular vote do not include states that do not elect state treasurers or territorial state treasurers.)
	Majority party	Minority party
Party	Republican	Democratic
Seats before	22	15
Seats after	23	14
Seat change	▲1	▼1
Seats up	5	4
Seats won	6	3
- Democratic hold Democratic gain Republican hold Republican gain No election

The 2020 United States state treasurer elections were held on November 3, 2020, to elect the state treasurer in seven states. These elections took place concurrently with several other federal, state, and local elections.

The previous elections for this group of states took place in 2016. The state treasurer of Vermont serves a two-year term and was last elected in 2018. Going into the election, there were 22 Republican state treasurers and 20 Democratic state treasurers. Five Republican state treasurers were up for election, of whom Kelly Schmidt of North Dakota was retiring. Four Democratic state treasurers were up for election, all seeking re-election.

Republicans flipped the state treasurer's office in West Virginia and Pennsylvania, while Democrats flipped the state treasurer's office in Washington.

== Partisan composition ==
Going into these elections, this class of secretaries of state was made up of five Republicans and four Democrats. Republicans were defending one state won by Hillary Clinton in 2016 (Washington), while Democrats were defending two states won by Donald Trump in 2016 (Pennsylvania and West Virginia).

== Race summary ==
State	State treasurer	Party	First elected	Status	Candidates
Missouri	Scott Fitzpatrick	Republican	2019 (appointed)	Incumbent elected to full term.	▌ ✓ Scott Fitzpatrick (Republican) 59.1%; ▌Vicki Englund (Democratic) 38.1%; ▌Nick Kasoff (Libertarian) 2.19%
North Carolina	Dale Folwell	Republican	2016	Incumbent re-elected.	▌ ✓ Dale Folwell (Republican) 52.58%; ▌Ronnie Chatterji (Democratic) 47.42%
North Dakota	Kelly Schmidt	Republican	2004	Incumbent retired. Republican hold.	▌ ✓ Thomas Beadle (Republican) 65.6%; ▌Mark Haugen (Democratic) 33.95%
Oregon	Tobias Read	Democratic	2016	Incumbent re-elected.	▌ ✓ Tobias Read (Democratic) 51.7%; ▌Jeff Gudman (Republican) 41.5%
Pennsylvania	Joe Torsella	Democratic	2016	Incumbent lost re-election. Republican gain.	▌ ✓ Stacy Garrity (Republican) 48.7%; ▌Joe Torsella (Democratic) 47.9%; ▌Joseph Soloski (Libertarian) 2.2%
Utah	David Damschen	Republican	2015 (appointed)	Incumbent re-elected.	▌ ✓ David Damschen (Republican) 74.57%; ▌Joseph Speciale (Libertarian) 14.8%
Vermont	Beth Pearce	Democratic	2010	Incumbent re-elected.	▌ ✓ Beth Pearce (Democratic) 53.17%; ▌Carolyn Whitney Branagan (Republican) 30.78%
Washington	Duane Davidson	Republican	2016	Incumbent lost re-election. Democratic gain.	▌ ✓ Mike Pellicciotti (Democratic) 53.4%; ▌Duane Davidson (Republican) 46.5%
West Virginia	John Perdue	Democratic	1996	Incumbent lost re-election. Republican gain.	▌ ✓ Riley Moore (Republican) 56.31%; ▌John Perdue (Democratic) 43.69%

== Closest races ==
States where the margin of victory was under 1%:

1. Pennsylvania, 0.8%

States where the margin of victory was under 10%:

1. North Carolina, 5.16%
2. Washington, 6.9%

Blue denotes races won by Democrats. Red denotes races won by Republicans.

== Missouri ==
Missouri State Treasurer election
- Turnout: 70.83%
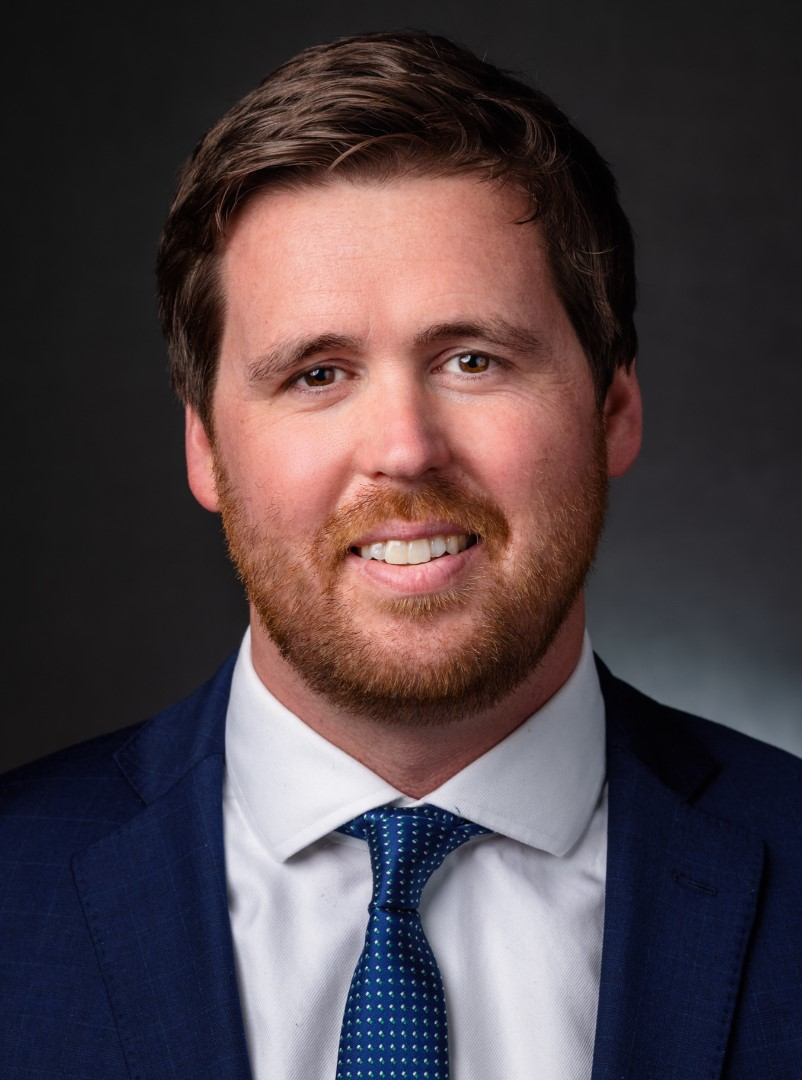

Nominee	Scott Fitzpatrick	Vicki Englund
Party	Republican	Democratic
Popular vote	1,742,943	1,122,547
Percentage	59.1%	38.1%
- County results Fitzpatrick: 50–60% 60–70% 70–80% 80–90% Englund: 40–50% 50–60% 70–80% 80–90% '
State Treasurer before election
Scott Fitzpatrick
Republican
Elected State Treasurer
Scott Fitzpatrick
Republican

Incumbent state treasurer Scott Fitzpatrick ran and won re-election to a full term after he defeated Democratic nominee Vicki Englund with 59.1% of the vote.

Republican primary results
Party	Candidate	Votes	%
Republican	Scott Fitzpatrick (incumbent)	597,408	100.0%
Total votes		597,408	100.0%

Democratic primary results
Party	Candidate	Votes	%
Democratic	Vicki Englund	473,904	100.0%
Total votes		473,904	100.0%

2020 Missouri State Treasurer election
Party	Candidate	Votes	%	±%
Republican	Scott Fitzpatrick (incumbent)	1,742,943	59.10%	▲2.65
Democratic	Vicki Englund	1,122,547	38.06%	▼1.31
Libertarian	Nick Kasoff	64,615	2.19%	▼0.68
Green	Joseph Civettini	19,107	0.65%	▼0.66
Total votes		2,949,212	100.00%	
Republican hold				

== North Carolina ==
North Carolina State Treasurer election
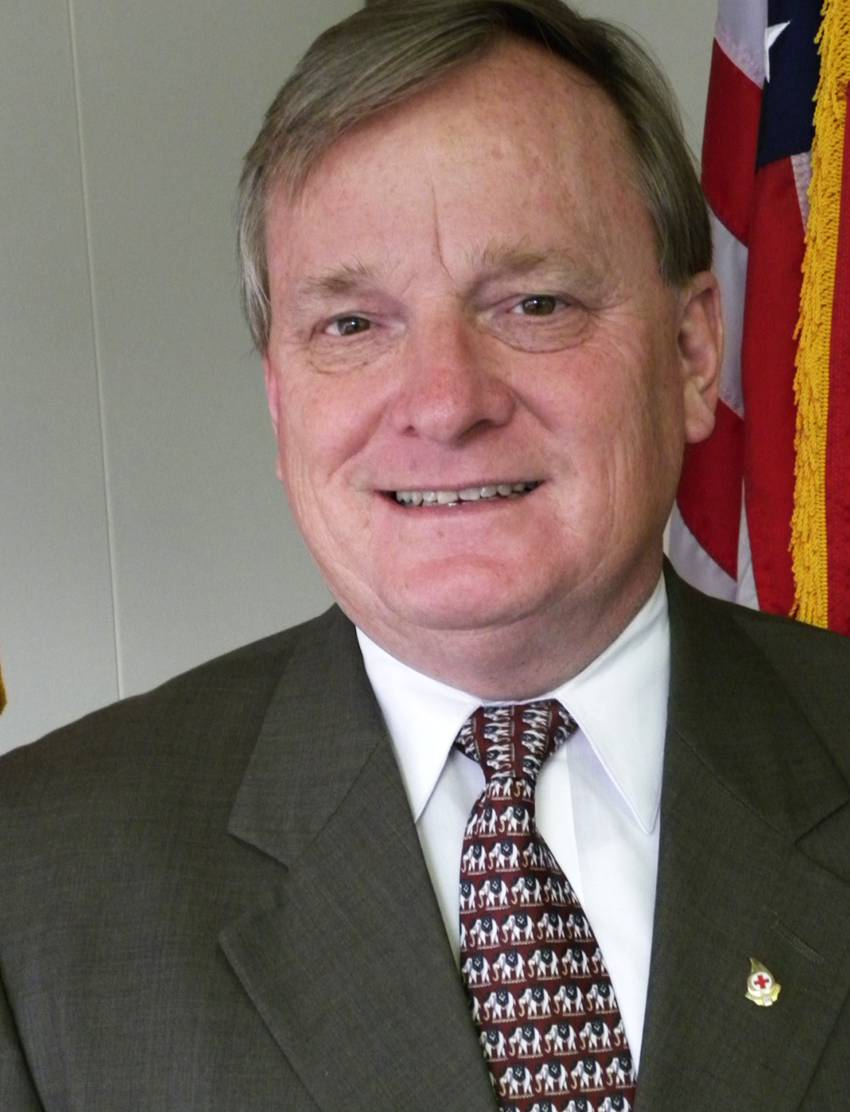

Nominee	Dale Folwell	Ronnie Chatterji
Party	Republican	Democratic
Popular vote	2,812,799	2,537,019
Percentage	52.58%	47.42%
- County results; Folwell: 50-60% 60-70% 70-80%; Chatterji: 50-60% 60-70% 70-80%
State Treasurer before election
Dale Folwell
Republican
Elected State Treasurer
Dale Folwell
Republican

Incumbent Republican Dale Fowell won re-election to a second term after he defeated Democratic nominee Ronnie Chatterji with 51.2% of the vote.

Democratic primary results
Party	Candidate	Votes	%
Democratic	Ronnie Chatterji	411,732	35.8
Democratic	Dimple Ajmera	390,888	34.0
Democratic	Matt Leatherman	347,226	30.2
Total votes		1,149,846	100.0

North Carolina State Treasurer election, 2020
Party	Candidate	Votes	%	±%
Republican	Dale Folwell (incumbent)	2,812,799	52.58%	−0.12%
Democratic	Ronnie Chatterji	2,537,019	47.42%	+0.12%
Total votes		5,349,818	100.0%	
Republican hold				

== North Dakota ==
North Dakota State Treasurer election
Nominee	Thomas Beadle	Mark Haugen
Party	Republican	Democratic
Popular vote	227,583	117,790
Percentage	65.60%	33.95%
State Treasurer before election
Kelly Schmidt
Republican
Elected State Treasurer
Thomas Beadle
Republican

Incumbent Republican state treasurer Kelly Schmidt was eligible to run for re-election but instead chose to retire. State Representative Thomas Beadle won, defeating Democratic nominee Mark Haugen.

2020 North Dakota State Treasurer election
Party	Candidate	Votes	%
Republican	Thomas Beadle	227,583	65.60%
Democratic–NPL	Mark Haugen	117,790	33.95%
Write-in		1,533	0.44%
Turnout		346,906	59.67%
Republican hold			

== Oregon ==
Oregon State Treasurer election
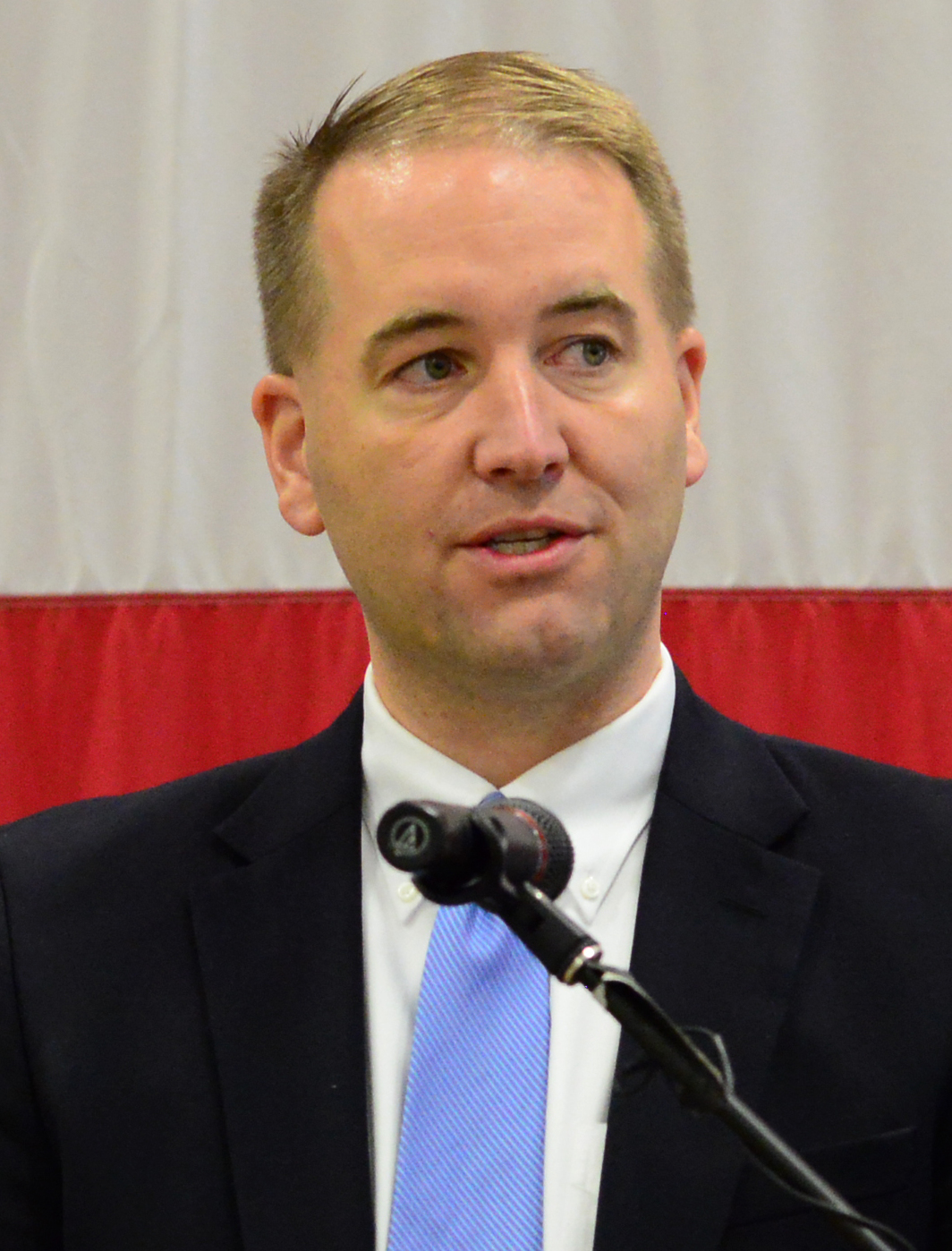

Candidate	Tobias Read	Jeff Gudman
Party	Democratic	Republican
Popular vote	1,166,703	936,916
Percentage	51.7%	41.5%
- County results Read: 40-50% 50–60% 60–70% 70–80% 80–90% >90% Gudman: 40–50% 50–60% 60–70% 70–80%
State Treasurer before election
Tobias Read
Democratic
Elected State Treasurer
Tobias Read
Democratic

Incumbent Democratic Tobias Read won re-election to a second term after he defeated Republican nominee Jeff Gudman with 51.7% of the vote.

Democratic primary results
Party	Candidate	Votes	%
Democratic	Tobias Read (incumbent)	464,429	98.73%
Write-in		5,956	1.27%
Total votes		470,385	100.0%

Republican primary results
Party	Candidate	Votes	%
Republican	Jeff Gudman	305,589	98.96%
Write-in		3,223	1.04%
Total votes		308,812	100.0%

2020 Oregon State Treasurer election
Party	Candidate	Votes	%	±%
Democratic	Tobias Read (incumbent)	1,166,703	51.68%	+7.57%
Republican	Jeff Gudman	936,916	41.50%	+0.15%
Independent Party	Chris Henry	99,870	4.43%	−4.99%
Constitution	Michael Marsh	51,894	2.30%	N/A
Write-in		2,072	0.09%	-0.10%
Total votes		2,257,455	100.0%	
Democratic hold				

== Pennsylvania ==
Pennsylvania State Treasurer election
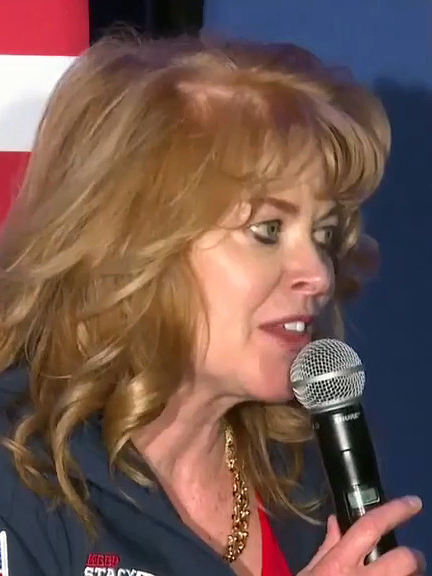

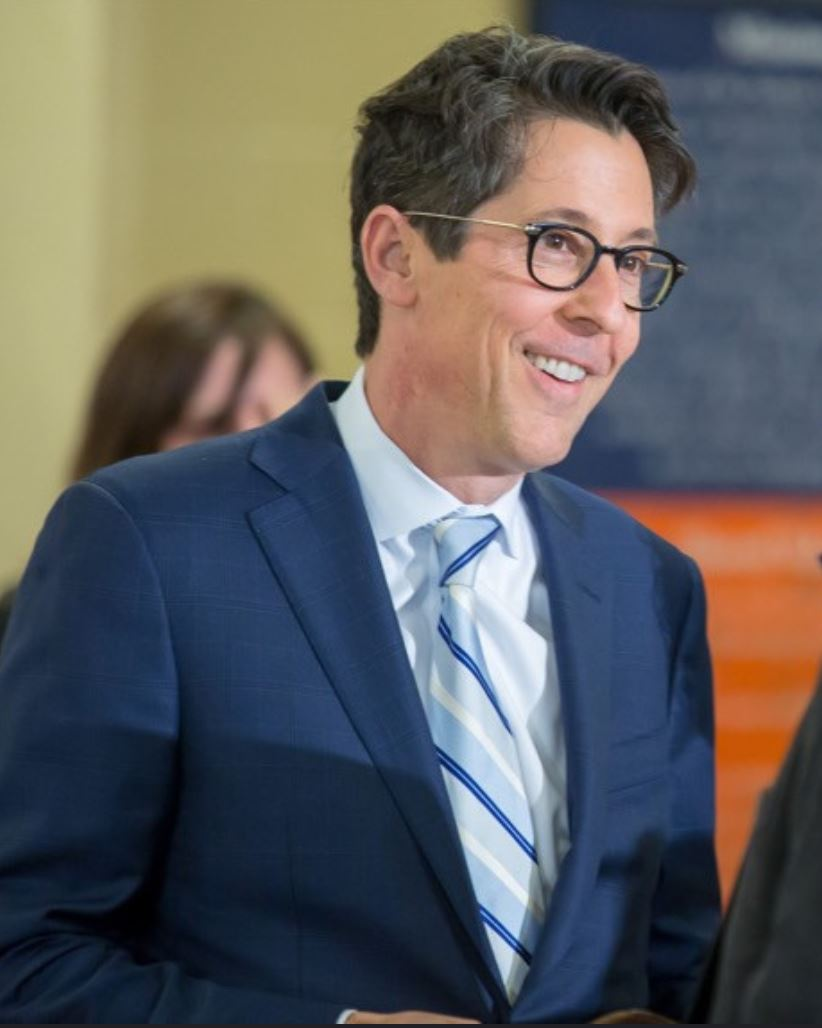
Nominee	Stacy Garrity	Joe Torsella
Party	Republican	Democratic
Popular vote	3,291,877	3,239,331
Percentage	48.7%	47.9%
- County results Garrity: 40–50% 50–60% 60–70% 70–80% 80–90% >90% Torsella: 40–50% 50–60% 60–70% 70–80% 80–90% >90%
State Treasurer before election
Joe Torsella
Democratic
Elected State Treasurer
Stacy Garrity
Republican

Incumbent Democratic state treasurer Joe Torsella ran for a second term but was defeated by Republican nominee Stacy Garrity.

Democratic primary results
Party	Candidate	Votes	%
Democratic	Joe Torsella (incumbent)	1,381,763	100.0%
Total votes		1,381,763	100.0%

Republican primary results
Party	Candidate	Votes	%
Republican	Stacy Garrity	1,047,510	100.0%
Total votes		1,047,510	100.0%

Pennsylvania State Treasurer election, 2020
Party	Candidate	Votes	%	±%
Republican	Stacy Garrity	3,291,877	48.68%	+4.47%
Democratic	Joe Torsella (incumbent)	3,239,331	47.91%	−2.75%
Libertarian	Joseph Soloski	148,614	2.20%	−0.05%
Green	Timothy Runkle	81,984	1.21%	−1.67%
Total votes		6,761,806	100.0%	
Republican gain from Democratic				

== Utah ==
Utah State Treasurer election
Nominee	David Damschen	Joseph Speciale	Richard Proctor
Party	Republican	Libertarian	Independent American
Popular vote	994,115	198, 549	140, 466
Percentage	74.57%	14.80%	10.54%
State Treasurer before election
David Damschen
Republican
Elected State Treasurer
David Damschen
Republican

Incumbent Republican state treasurer David Damschen won re-election to a full term after he defeated Libertarian nominee Joseph Speciale.

2020 Utah Treasurer election
Party	Candidate	Votes	%
Republican	David Damschen (incumbent)	994,115	74.57%
Libertarian	Joseph Speciale	198,549	14.89%
Independent American	Richard Proctor	140,466	10.54%
Total votes		1,333,130	100.00%
Republican hold			

== Vermont ==
Vermont State Treasurer election
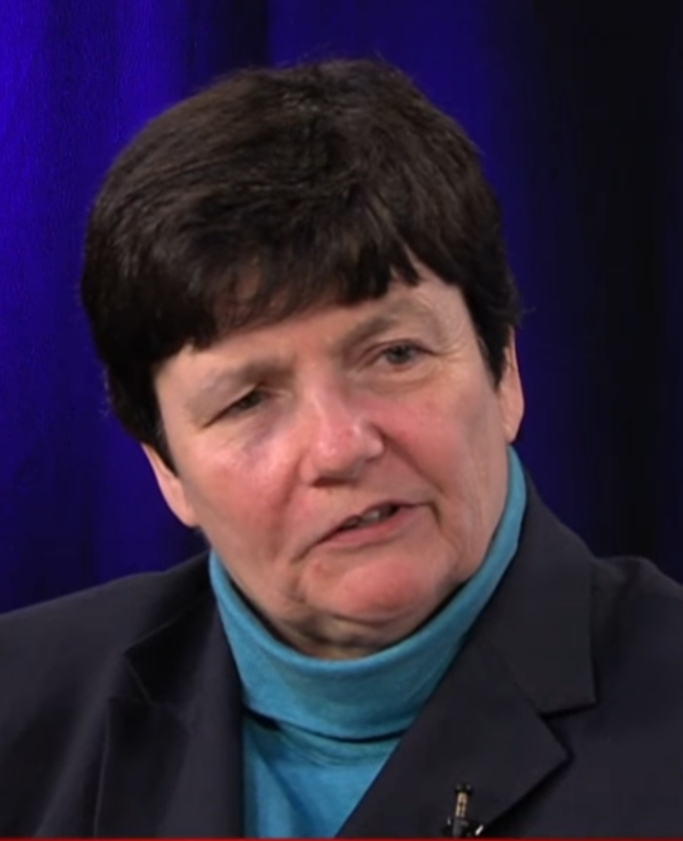

Nominee	Beth Pearce	Carolyn Whitney Branagan
Party	Democratic	Republican
Popular vote	197,255	114,177
Percentage	53.17%	30.78%
- County results Pearce: 40–50% 50–60% 60–70% Branagan: 40–50% 50–60%
State Treasurer before election
Beth Pearce
Democratic
Elected State Treasurer
Beth Pearce
Democratic

Incumbent Democratic Beth Pearce won re-election to a sixth term after she defeated Republican nominee Carolyn Whitney Branagan.

== Washington ==
Washington State Treasurer election
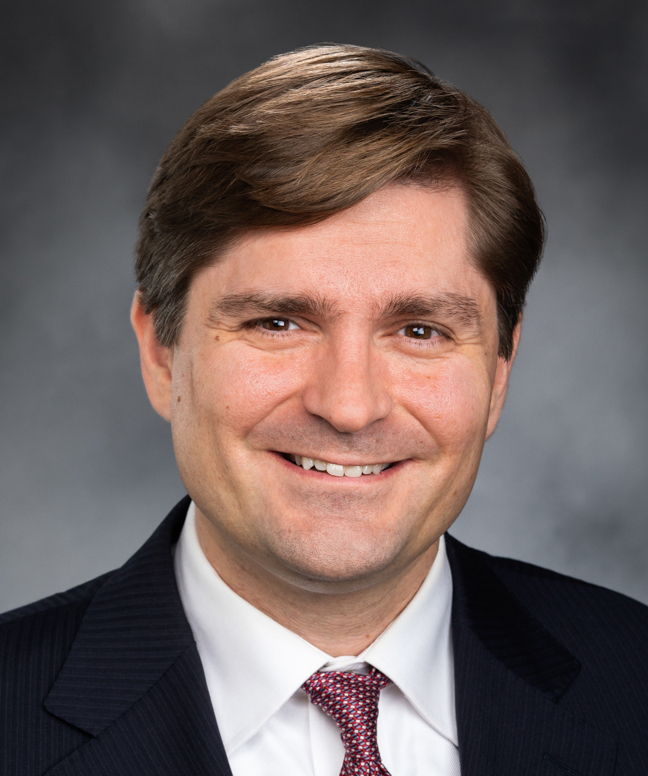

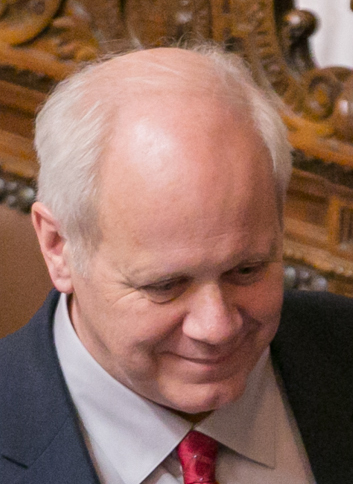
Nominee	Mike Pellicciotti	Duane Davidson
Party	Democratic	Republican
Popular vote	2,089,159	1,818,895
Percentage	53.4%	46.5%
- County results Pellicciotti: 50–60% 60–70% 70–80% Davidson: 50–60% 60–70% 70–80%
State Treasurer before election
Duane Davidson
Republican
Elected State Treasurer
Mike Pellicciotti
Democratic

Incumbent Republican state treasurer Duane Davidson ran for re-election but was defeated by Democratic nominee Mike Pellicciotti.

2020 Washington State Treasurer election
Primary election
Party	Candidate	Votes	%
Democratic	Mike Pellicciotti	1,279,452	53.2
Republican	Duane Davidson (incumbent)	1,121,885	46.7
Write-in		2,604	0.1
Total votes		2,403,941	100.0
General election
Democratic	Mike Pellicciotti	2,089,159	53.4
Republican	Duane Davidson (incumbent)	1,818,895	46.5
Write-in		3,339	0.1
Total votes		3,911,393	100.0
Democratic gain from Republican			

== West Virginia ==
West Virginia State Treasurer election
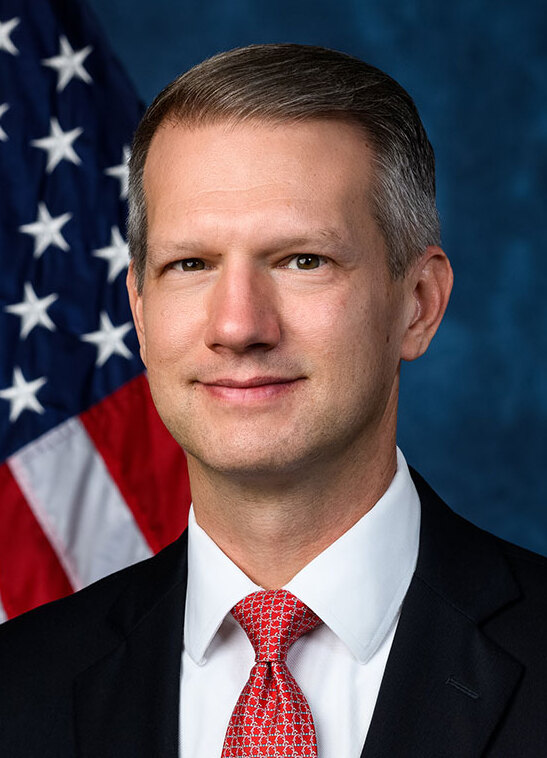

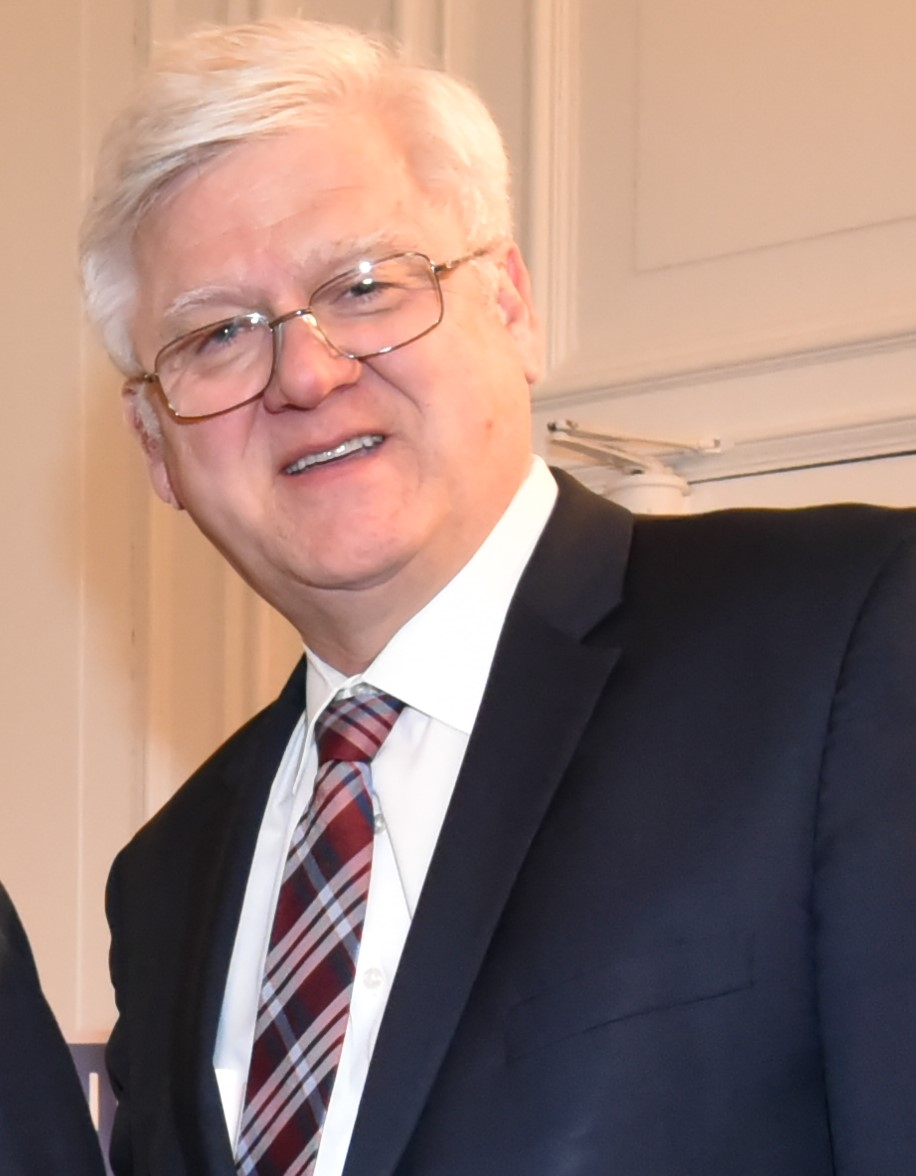
Nominee	Riley Moore	John Perdue
Party	Republican	Democratic
Popular vote	425,745	330,316
Percentage	56.31%	43.69%
- County results Moore: 50–60% 60–70% 70–80% 80–90% Perdue: 50–60% 60-70%
State Treasurer before election
John Perdue
Democratic
Elected State Treasurer
Riley Moore
Republican

Incumbent Democratic state treasurer John Perdue ran for re-election but was defeated by Republican nominee Riley Moore.

Democratic primary results
Party	Candidate	Votes	%
Democratic	John Perdue (incumbent)	170,519	100.0%
Total votes		170,519	100.0%

Republican primary results
Party	Candidate	Votes	%
Republican	Riley Moore	166,977	100.0%
Total votes		166,977	100.0%

General election results
Party	Candidate	Votes	%
Republican	Riley Moore	425,745	56.31%
Democratic	John Perdue (incumbent)	330,316	43.69%
Total votes		756,061	100.0%
Republican gain from Democratic			
