= 2026 Vermont State Treasurer election =

- November 3, 2026
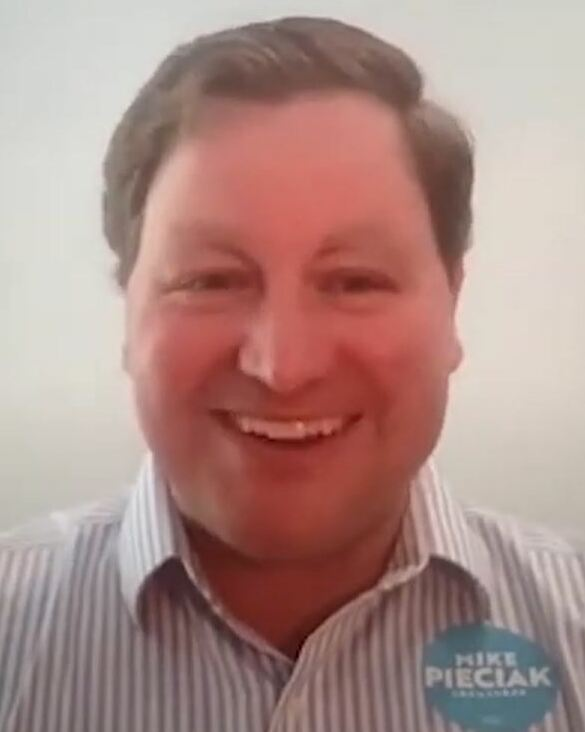

Nominee	Mike Pieciak	Lynn LaFleur (replacing H. Brooke Paige)	Zachary Hampl
Party	Democratic	Republican	Progressive
Popular vote	185,802	92,845	19,245
Percentage	62.29%	31.13%	6.45%
State Treasurer before election
Mike Pieciak
Democratic
Elected State Treasurer
Mike Pieciak
Democratic

The 2026 Vermont State Treasurer election was held on November 3, 2026, to elect the Vermont State Treasurer. Incumbent Democratic treasurer Mike Pieciak won a second two-year term. Primary elections were held on August 11, 2026.

Incumbent Democratic state treasurer Mike Pieciak, who was re-elected in 2024 with 60.8% of the vote, won re-election to a third term in office.

== Democratic primary ==
=== Candidates ===
==== Nominee ====
- Mike Pieciak, incumbent state treasurer

=== Endorsements ===
Mike Pieciak

U.S. representatives

- Becca Balint, VT-AL (2023–present)

Statewide officials

- Sue Minter, former secretary of the Vermont Agency of Transportation (2015)
- Beth Pearce, former state treasurer of Vermont (2011–2023)
- Peter Shumlin, former governor of Vermont (2011–2017)

Labor unions

- Professional Fire Fighters Association of Vermont
- Vermont State Labor Council, AFL-CIO

Organizations

- Sierra Club Vermont

=== Results ===
Democratic primary results
Party	Candidate	Votes	%
Democratic	Mike Pieciak (incumbent)	75,777	99.0
Write-in		740	1.0
Total votes		76,517	100.0

== Republican primary ==
=== Candidates ===
==== Nominee ====
- Lynn LaFleur, accounting professional

==== Withdrew after nomination ====
- H. Brooke Paige, newsstand owner and perennial candidate

=== Results ===
Republican primary results
Party	Candidate	Votes	%
Republican	H. Brooke Paige	17,968	96.5
Write-in		660	3.5
Total votes		18,628	100.0

=== Post-primary ===
H. Brooke Paige, who also won the Republican nominations for state Attorney General, state Secretary of State, and state Auditor of Accounts, withdrew from all but the secretary of state race on August 19, in order to allow the Vermont Republican Party to name replacement candidates. The Vermont Republican Party picked Lynn LaFleur to be the Republican nominee for State Treasurer.

== Progressive primary ==
=== Background ===
The Vermont Progressive Party state committee voted against endorsing Zachary Hampl in May 2026, with then-party chair Bill Hunsinger expressing concern about Hampl's unclear political views and lack of "progressive credentials". Hampl himself stated that he did not fully align with any party and that his views had evolved over time.

Hampl won the August primary unopposed despite lacking the party's support.

=== Candidates ===
==== Nominee ====
- Zachary Hampl, emergency medical technician

Progressive primary results
Party	Candidate	Votes	%
Progressive	Zachary Hampl	289	79.2
Write-in		76	20.8
Total votes		365	100.0

== General election ==
=== Results ===
2026 Vermont State Treasurer election
Party	Candidate	Votes	%	±%
Democratic	Mike Pieciak (incumbent)	185,802	62.29	+1.50
Republican	Lynn LaFleur	92,845	31.13	−7.96
Progressive	Zachary Hampl	19,245	6.45	
Write-in		388	0.13	
Total votes		298,280	100.0	
Democratic hold				
