= Elizabeth Pearce =

Elizabeth Pearce may refer to:

- Beth Pearce (born 1952/1953), American politician
- Elizabeth Pearce, character in Caddyshack II
