= Cloria Brown =

American politician

Member of the Missouri House of Representatives from the 85th district
- In office January 5, 2011 – January 9, 2013
- Preceded by: Vicki Englund
- Succeeded by: Vicki Englund

Member of the Missouri House of Representatives from the 94th district
- In office January 7, 2015 – March 18, 2018
- Preceded by: Vicki Englund
- Succeeded by: Jim Murphy

Personal details
- Born: May 29, 1942 Manila, Arkansas, U.S.
- Died: March 18, 2018 (aged 75)
- Party: Republican
- Spouse: Frank Brown
- Children: 1
- Profession: Business executive, software tech manager

Cloria Conway Brown (née Richey; May 29, 1942 – March 18, 2018) was an American politician.

Brown was born in Manila, Arkansas. She received her bachelor's degree in informational systems from Washington University in St. Louis. Brown worked as an executive and soft tech manager. She was a member of the Missouri House of Representatives, having served one term from 2011 to 2013, and two terms from 2015 until her death. She was a member of the Republican Party.

== Death ==
Brown died from cancer on March 18, 2018. She is survived by her daughter, Mrs. Cathy Fiedler; her granddaughter, Ally Keaton; and her sister, Jackie.

== Electoral history ==
=== State representative ===
Missouri House of Representatives Election, November 4, 2008, District 85
Party	Candidate	Votes	%	±%
Republican	Cloria Brown	7,798	45.54%	−6.44
Democratic	Vicki Lorenz Englund	9,326	54.46%	+6.44

Missouri House of Representatives Election, November 2, 2010, District 85
Party	Candidate	Votes	%	±%
Republican	Cloria Brown	6,482	52.67%	+7.13
Democratic	Vicki Lorenz Englund	5,824	47.33%	−7.13

Missouri House of Representatives Election, November 6, 2012, District 94
Party	Candidate	Votes	%	±%
Republican	Cloria Brown	8,255	49.07%	−3.60
Democratic	Vicki Lorenz Englund	8,568	50.93%	+3.60

Missouri House of Representatives Election, November 4, 2014, District 94
Party	Candidate	Votes	%	±%
Republican	Cloria Brown	5,334	55.71%	+6.64
Democratic	Vicki Lorenz Englund	4,240	44.29%	−6.64

Missouri House of Representatives Election, November 8, 2016, District 94
Party	Candidate	Votes	%	±%
Republican	Cloria Brown	8,969	51.10%	−4.61
Democratic	Vicki Lorenz Englund	8,582	48.90%	+4.61
