= Alan Green (Missouri politician) =

American politician

Member of Missouri House of Representatives for District 67
- In office September 10, 2014 – January 6, 2021
- Succeeded by: Neil Smith

Personal details
- Party: Democratic
- Website: www.alankgreen.com

Alan K. Green is an American politician. He was a member of the Missouri House of Representatives from 2014 to 2021.

Green endorsed the Joe Biden 2020 presidential campaign. Green was the Democratic candidate in the 2022 Missouri State Auditor election.
