= 2020 Missouri State Treasurer election =

- November 3, 2020
- Turnout: 70.83%
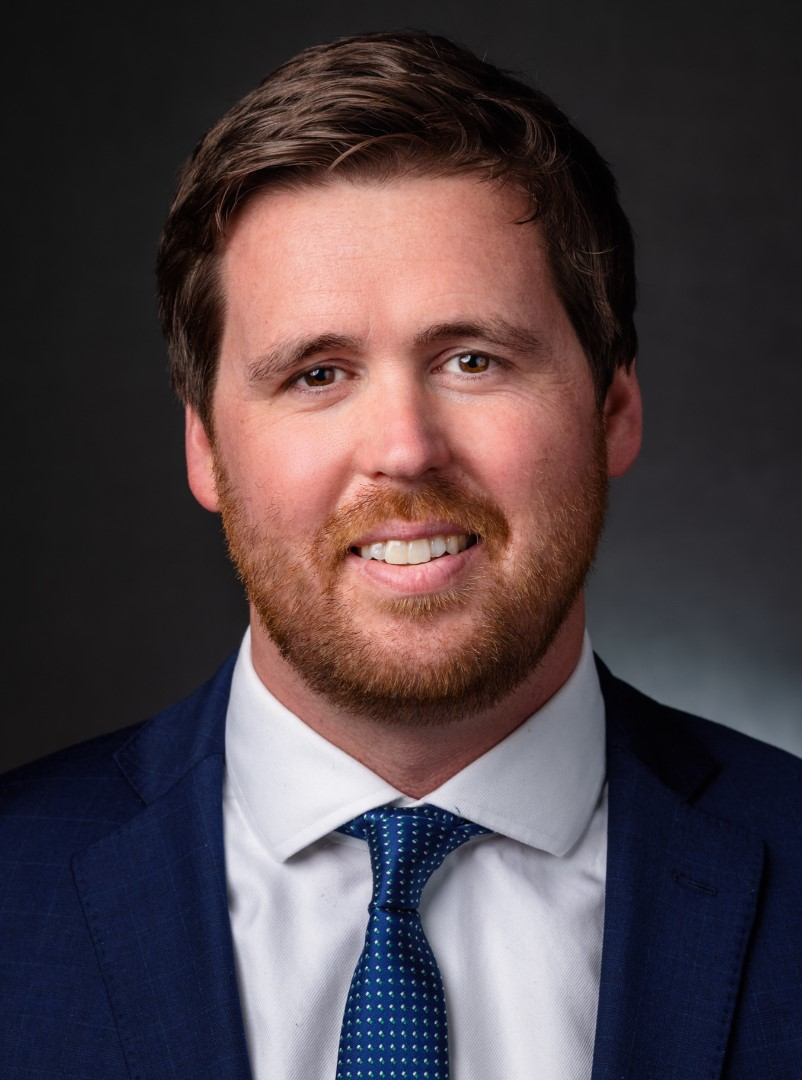

Nominee	Scott Fitzpatrick	Vicki Englund
Party	Republican	Democratic
Popular vote	1,742,943	1,122,547
Percentage	59.10%	38.06%
- Fitzpatrick: 40–50% 50–60% 60–70% 70–80% 80–90% >90% Englund: 40–50% 50–60% 60–70% 70–80% 80–90% >90% Tie: 40–50% 50% No data
State Treasurer before election
Scott Fitzpatrick
Republican
Elected State Treasurer
Scott Fitzpatrick
Republican

The 2020 Missouri State Treasurer election was held on November 3, 2020, to elect the State Treasurer of the U.S. state of Missouri. Elections were also held for U.S. president, U.S. House, and governor of Missouri, as well as various state and local elections.

Incumbent Republican Scott Fitzpatrick was appointed by Governor Mike Parson to finish the term of previous Treasurer Eric Schmitt, who had been subsequently appointed as Attorney General. In 2016, Schmitt was elected with 56.5% of the vote, gaining control of a previously Democratic controlled office.

== Republican primary ==
=== Candidates ===
==== Declared ====
- Scott Fitzpatrick, incumbent Treasurer of Missouri

=== Results ===
Republican primary results
Party	Candidate	Votes	%
Republican	Scott Fitzpatrick (incumbent)	597,408	100.0%
Total votes		597,408	100.0%

== Democratic primary ==
=== Candidates ===
==== Declared ====
- Vicki Englund, former state representative

=== Results ===
Democratic primary results
Party	Candidate	Votes	%
Democratic	Vicki Englund	473,904	100.0%
Total votes		473,904	100.0%

== Third parties ==
=== Green Party ===
==== Candidates ====
===== Declared =====
- Joseph Civettini

==== Results ====
Green primary results
Party	Candidate	Votes	%
Green	Joseph Civettini	852	100.0%
Total votes		852	100.0%

=== Libertarian Party ===
==== Candidates ====
===== Declared =====
- Nick Kasoff

==== Results ====
Libertarian primary results
Party	Candidate	Votes	%
Libertarian	Nick Kasoff	4,096	100.0%
Total votes		4,096	100.0%

== General election ==
=== Polling ===
Poll source	Date(s) administered	Sample size (Note: Key: A – all adults RV – registered voters LV – likely voters V – unclear)	Margin of error	Scott Fitzpatrick (R)	Vicki Englund (D)	Undecided
Remington Research Group/Missouri Scout	September 16–17, 2020	1,046 (LV)	± 3%	47%	38%	15%
Human Agency/Missouri Scout	December 20–24, 2019	415 (RV)	± 5%	51%	34%	15%
Human Agency/Missouri Scout	October 18–20, 2019	550 (RV)	± 4%	46%	32%	22%

=== Results ===
2020 Missouri State Treasurer election
Party	Candidate	Votes	%	±%
Republican	Scott Fitzpatrick (incumbent)	1,742,943	59.10%	▲2.65
Democratic	Vicki Englund	1,122,547	38.06%	▼1.31
Libertarian	Nick Kasoff	64,615	2.19%	▼0.68
Green	Joseph Civettini	19,107	0.65%	▼0.66
Total votes		2,949,212	100.00%	
Republican hold				

==== By congressional district ====
Fitzpatrick won six of eight congressional districts.

District	Fitzpatrick	Englund	Representative
1st	20%	77%	Lacy Clay (116th Congress)
1st	20%	77%	Cori Bush (117th Congress)
2nd	55%	43%	Ann Wagner
3rd	69%	29%	Blaine Luetkemeyer
4th	68%	29%	Vicky Hartzler
5th	41%	55%	Emanuel Cleaver
6th	66%	32%	Sam Graves
7th	73%	25%	Billy Long
8th	78%	20%	Jason Smith

== See also ==
- 2020 Missouri gubernatorial election
