= Vicki Englund =

American politician

Member of the Missouri House of Representatives from the 94th district
- In office January 9, 2013 – January 7, 2015
- Preceded by: Rick Stream (redistricting)
- Succeeded by: Cloria Brown

Member of the Missouri House of Representatives from the 85th district
- In office January 7, 2009 – January 4, 2011
- Preceded by: Jim Lembke
- Succeeded by: Cloria Brown

Personal details
- Born: July 29, 1974 (age 51) St. Louis, Missouri, U.S.
- Party: Democratic
- Education: American University (BA, MA)
- Website: Official website

Vicki Lorenz Englund is an American politician who served as a Democratic member of the Missouri House of Representatives from 2009 to 2011 and from 2013 to 2015. In 2013, Englund sponsored a bill that would help the State Treasurer of Missouri return military medals to their original owners. The bill passed unanimously.

Her professional experience includes founding giftpakexpress.com, and serving as South County Sector Specialist for the St. Louis County Economic Council from 2001 to 2004.

Englund was a candidate for State Treasurer of Missouri in 2020.

Englund has filed to run for St. Louis County Council District 3 in the 2022 election.

== Electoral history ==
=== State representative ===
Missouri House of Representatives Democratic primary election, August 5, 2008, District 85
Party	Candidate	Votes	%	±%
Democratic	Vicki Lorenz Englund	1,222	67.00%	
Democratic	Ron Wagganer	602	33.00%	

Missouri House of Representatives election, November 4, 2008, District 85
Party	Candidate	Votes	%	±%
Democratic	Vicki Lorenz Englund	9,326	54.46%	+6.44
Republican	Cloria Brown	7,798	45.54%	−6.44

Missouri House of Representatives election, November 2, 2010, District 85
Party	Candidate	Votes	%	±%
Democratic	Vicki Lorenz Englund	5,824	47.33%	−7.13
Republican	Cloria Brown	6,482	52.67%	+7.13

Missouri House of Representatives election, November 6, 2012, District 94
Party	Candidate	Votes	%	±%
Democratic	Vicki Lorenz Englund	8,568	50.93%	+3.60
Republican	Cloria Brown	8,255	49.07%	−3.60

Missouri House of Representatives election, November 4, 2014, District 94
Party	Candidate	Votes	%	±%
Democratic	Vicki Lorenz Englund	4,240	44.29%	−6.64
Republican	Cloria Brown	5,334	55.71%	+6.64

Missouri House of Representatives election, November 8, 2016, District 94
Party	Candidate	Votes	%	±%
Democratic	Vicki Lorenz Englund	8,582	48.90%	+4.61
Republican	Cloria Brown	8,969	51.10%	−4.61

=== State Treasurer ===
Missouri Treasurer Election, November 3, 2020
Party	Candidate	Votes	%	±%
Republican	Scott Fitzpatrick	1,742,943	59.10	
Democratic	Vicki Lorenz Englund	1,122,547	38.06	
Libertarian	Nicolas Kasoff	64,615	2.19	
Green	Joseph Civettini	19,107	0.65	

Party political offices
Preceded by Judy Baker	Democratic nominee for State Treasurer of Missouri; 2020	Most recent
