= 2022 Missouri State Auditor election =

- November 8, 2022
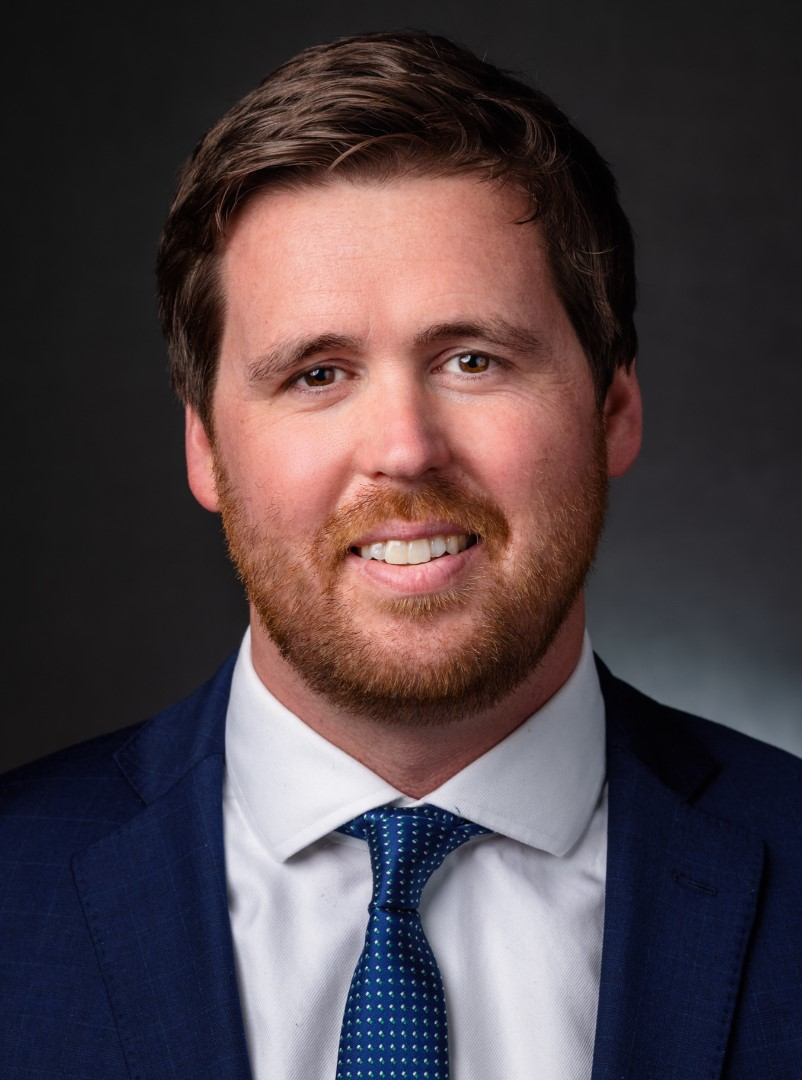

Nominee	Scott Fitzpatrick	Alan Green
Party	Republican	Democratic
Popular vote	1,219,553	772,005
Percentage	59.41%	37.61%
- County results Fitzpatrick: 50–60% 60–70% 70–80% 80–90% Green: 50–60% 70–80%
State Auditor before election
Nicole Galloway
Democratic
Elected State Auditor
Scott Fitzpatrick
Republican

The general election of Missouri State Auditor occurred during the 2022 United States midterm election, along with the 2022 United States Senate election in Missouri, on November 8, 2022. Incumbent State Auditor Nicole Galloway, Missouri's only statewide elected Democrat, did not seek re-election to a second full term in office. Missouri State Treasurer Scott Fitzpatrick won the election, leaving Democrats with no statewide seats in Missouri. This was the first time since 1933 that all statewide executive offices were held by Republicans, and the first time since 1871 that all statewide offices were held by Republicans.

== Democratic primary ==
=== Candidates ===
==== Declared ====
- Alan Green, former state representative (2014–2021)

==== Withdrew ====
- Nicole Galloway, incumbent State Auditor

=== Results ===
Democratic primary results
Party	Candidate	Votes	%
Democratic	Alan Green	321,423	100%
Total votes		321,423	100%

== Republican primary ==
=== Candidates ===
==== Declared ====
- Scott Fitzpatrick, State Treasurer (2019–2023)

==== Eliminated in primary ====
- David Gregory, former state representative (2017–2023) and state senator (2025-present)

=== Endorsements ===
Scott Fitzpatrick

Statewide officials

- Mike Kehoe, Lieutenant Governor of Missouri (2018–2025)
- Peter Kinder, former Lieutenant Governor of Missouri (2005–2017)
- Mike Parson, Governor of Missouri (2018–2025)

State legislators

- Elijah Haahr, former Speaker of the Missouri House of Representatives
- Brad Lager, former state senator (2007–2015)
- Todd Richardson, former Speaker of the Missouri House of Representatives

Individuals

- Rex Sinquefield, philanthropist and president of the Show-Me Institute

Organizations

- Missouri Cattlemen’s Association’s
- Missouri Right to Life
David Gregory

State Representatives

- Dean Plocher, Majority Leader of the Missouri House of Representatives (2021–present) and state representative (2016–present)

Individuals

- David Steward, founder of World Wide Technology

Organizations

- International Association of Fire Fighters Local 2665
- Missouri Right to Life
- Missouri State Council of Fire Fighters
- Missouri State Fraternal Order of Police

=== Polling ===
Graphical summary

Poll source	Date(s) administered	Sample size (Note: Key: A – all adults RV – registered voters LV – likely voters V – unclear)	Margin of error	Scott Fitzpatrick	David Gregory	Rob Vescovo	Undecided
Remington Research (R)/Missouri Scout (Note: Non-partisan poll conducted for the local non-partisan tipsheet Missouri Scout)	July 27–28, 2022	818 (LV)	± 3.4%	36%	22%	–	42%
Remington Research (R)/Missouri Scout	July 23–24, 2022	802 (LV)	± 3.4%	33%	13%	–	54%
Remington Research (R)/Missouri Scout	June 22–23, 2022	911 (LV)	± 3.1%	18%	12%	–	70%
Remington Research (R)/Missouri Scout	March 22–23, 2022	941 (LV)	± 3.1%	17%	12%	–	71%
Remington Research (R)/Missouri Scout	January 26–27, 2022	902 (LV)	± 3.1%	25%	12%	–	63%
Remington Research (R)/Missouri Scout	December 1–2, 2021	744 (LV)	± 3.4%	29%	13%	–	58%
Remington Research (R)/Missouri Scout	September 8–9, 2021	847 (LV)	± 3.2%	29%	10%	–	61%
Remington Research (R)/Missouri Scout	July 7–8, 2021	1,002 (LV)	± 3.0%	28%	5%	6%	61%
Remington Research (R)/Missouri Scout	June 9–10, 2021	1,011 (LV)	± 3.0%	24%	11%	–	65%

=== Results ===
Republican primary results
Party	Candidate	Votes	%
Republican	Scott Fitzpatrick	378,275	64.69%
Republican	David Gregory	206,452	35.31%
Total votes		584,727	100%

== Libertarian primary ==
=== Candidates ===
==== Declared ====
- John A. Hartwig Jr, accountant

=== Results ===
Libertarian primary results
Party	Candidate	Votes	%
Libertarian	John A. Hartwig Jr	2,958	100%
Total votes		2,958	100%

== General election ==
=== Debates ===
2022 United States Senate general election in Missouri debates
No.	Date	Host	Moderator	Link	Republican	Democratic
P Participant A Absent N Non-invitee I Invitee W Withdrawn						
P Participant A Absent N Non-invitee I Invitee W Withdrawn					Scott Fitzpatrick	Alan Green
1	November 16, 2022	This Week In Missouri Politics	Scott Faughn	Debate	P	P

=== Polling ===
Poll source	Date(s) administered	Sample size	Margin of error	Alan Green (D)	Scott Fitzpatrick (R)	John A. Hartwig Jr. (L)	Undecided
Remington Research (R)/Missouri Scout	October 25–25, 2022	1,011 (LV)	± 3.0%	37%	54%	3%	6%
Remington Research (R)/Missouri Scout	August 24–25, 2022	1,011 (LV)	± 3.0%	35%	53%	4%	9%

=== Results ===
2022 Missouri State Auditor election
Party	Candidate	Votes	%	±%
Republican	Scott Fitzpatrick	1,219,553	59.41%	+14.80%
Democratic	Alan Green	772,005	37.61%	−12.80%
Libertarian	John A. Hartwig Jr.	61,329	2.99%	+0.85%
Write-in		7	0.00%	N/A
Total votes		2,052,894	100.00%	N/A
Republican gain from Democratic				

==== By county ====
County	Alan Green Democratic		Scott Fitzpatrick Republican		Various candidates Other parties		Margin		Total
County	#	%	#	%	#	%	#	%	Total
Adair	2,151	30.62%	4,611	65.64%	263	3.74%	2,460	35.02%	7,025
Andrew	1,405	21.09%	5,076	76.18%	182	2.73%	3,671	55.10%	6,663
Atchison	348	18.33%	1,513	79.67%	38	2.00%	1,165	61.35%	1,899
Audrain	1,655	22.28%	5,566	74.93%	207	2.79%	3,911	52.65%	7,428
Barry	1,529	13.96%	9,200	83.99%	225	2.05%	7,671	70.03%	10,954
Barton	494	11.49%	3,739	86.93%	68	1.58%	3,245	75.45%	4,301
Bates	1,076	18.88%	4,453	78.12%	171	3.00%	3,377	59.25%	5,700
Benton	1,453	18.92%	6,005	78.20%	221	2.88%	4,552	59.28%	7,679
Bollinger	463	11.17%	3,617	87.28%	64	1.54%	3,154	76.11%	4,144
Boone	32,189	51.42%	28,351	45.29%	2,063	3.30%	-3,838	-6.13%	62,603
Buchanan	7,777	31.99%	15,765	64.84%	770	3.17%	7,988	32.86%	24,312
Butler	1,733	15.10%	9,513	82.89%	231	2.01%	7,780	67.79%	11,477
Caldwell	586	17.19%	2,701	79.25%	121	3.55%	2,115	62.06%	3,408
Callaway	3,660	24.50%	10,789	72.22%	490	3.28%	7,129	47.72%	14,939
Camden	3,725	20.49%	13,971	76.84%	485	2.67%	10,246	56.36%	18,181
Cape Girardeau	6,132	22.08%	21,018	75.67%	625	2.25%	14,886	53.59%	27,775
Carroll	513	15.33%	2,753	82.28%	80	2.39%	2,240	66.95%	3,346
Carter	262	13.94%	1,592	84.68%	26	1.38%	1,330	70.74%	1,880
Cass	11,787	29.85%	26,291	66.59%	1,406	3.56%	14,504	36.73%	39,484
Cedar	750	14.73%	4,198	82.43%	145	2.85%	3,448	67.70%	5,093
Chariton	567	20.38%	2,142	76.99%	73	2.62%	1,575	56.61%	2,782
Christian	6,911	20.86%	25,265	76.26%	953	2.88%	18,354	55.40%	33,129
Clark	428	18.33%	1,828	78.29%	79	3.38%	1,400	59.96%	2,335
Clay	37,428	43.22%	45,777	52.86%	3,397	3.92%	8,349	9.64%	86,602
Clinton	1,861	24.80%	5,408	72.08%	234	3.12%	3,547	47.27%	7,503
Cole	7,801	27.47%	19,744	69.53%	850	2.99%	11,943	42.06%	28,395
Cooper	1,398	22.93%	4,526	74.25%	172	2.82%	3,128	51.31%	6,096
Crawford	1,327	17.52%	6,066	80.07%	183	2.42%	4,739	62.55%	7,576
Dade	418	13.95%	2,521	84.15%	57	1.90%	2,103	70.19%	2,996
Dallas	894	15.69%	4,642	81.47%	162	2.84%	3,748	65.78%	5,698
Daviess	496	18.47%	2,122	79.03%	67	2.50%	1,626	60.56%	2,685
DeKalb	556	16.56%	2,698	80.37%	103	3.07%	2,142	63.81%	3,357
Dent	653	13.13%	4,179	84.02%	142	2.85%	3,526	70.89%	4,974
Douglas	639	12.81%	4,226	84.74%	122	2.45%	3,587	71.93%	4,987
Dunklin	1,086	17.60%	4,986	80.78%	100	1.62%	3,900	63.19%	6,172
Franklin	9,297	25.28%	26,429	71.86%	1,054	2.87%	17,132	46.58%	36,780
Gasconade	1,007	17.74%	4,547	80.08%	124	2.18%	3,540	62.35%	5,678
Gentry	425	18.41%	1,821	78.90%	62	2.69%	1,396	60.49%	2,308
Greene	34,975	35.84%	59,696	61.17%	2,924	3.00%	24,721	25.33%	97,595
Grundy	484	15.11%	2,632	82.15%	88	2.75%	2,148	67.04%	3,204
Harrison	335	12.31%	2,342	86.07%	44	1.62%	2,007	73.76%	2,721
Henry	1,621	21.79%	5,603	75.31%	216	2.90%	3,982	53.52%	7,440
Hickory	669	18.39%	2,882	79.22%	87	2.39%	2,213	60.83%	3,638
Holt	215	12.93%	1,419	85.33%	29	1.74%	1,204	72.40%	1,663
Howard	929	24.33%	2,741	71.77%	149	3.90%	1,812	47.45%	3,819
Howell	2,044	15.51%	10,766	81.68%	370	2.81%	8,722	66.18%	13,180
Iron	602	19.83%	2,345	77.24%	89	2.93%	1,743	57.41%	3,036
Jackson	121,678	56.63%	86,087	40.06%	7,109	3.31%	-35,591	-16.56%	214,874
Jasper	7,673	22.15%	25,962	74.95%	1,006	2.90%	18,289	52.80%	34,641
Jefferson	23,956	30.53%	51,777	65.98%	2,737	3.49%	27,821	35.45%	78,470
Johnson	4,243	27.15%	10,793	69.07%	590	3.78%	6,550	41.92%	15,626
Knox	230	17.24%	1,058	79.31%	46	3.45%	828	62.07%	1,334
Laclede	1,653	14.57%	9,403	82.90%	286	2.52%	7,750	68.33%	11,342
Lafayette	2,851	23.79%	8,729	72.83%	405	3.38%	5,878	49.04%	11,985
Lawrence	1,889	15.08%	10,330	82.48%	305	2.44%	8,441	67.40%	12,524
Lewis	574	18.29%	2,476	78.90%	88	2.80%	1,902	60.61%	3,138
Lincoln	4,227	21.39%	14,856	75.17%	680	3.44%	10,629	53.78%	19,763
Linn	893	21.87%	3,063	75.02%	127	3.11%	2,170	53.15%	4,083
Livingston	863	18.31%	3,738	79.31%	112	2.38%	2,875	61.00%	4,713
Macon	1,022	18.34%	4,434	79.56%	117	2.10%	3,412	61.22%	5,573
Madison	672	18.20%	2,952	79.96%	68	1.84%	2,280	61.76%	3,692
Maries	513	14.90%	2,859	83.01%	72	2.09%	2,346	68.12%	3,444
Marion	1,886	21.80%	6,570	75.95%	194	2.24%	4,684	54.15%	8,650
McDonald	831	13.65%	5,114	84.03%	141	2.32%	4,283	70.37%	6,086
Mercer	150	11.90%	1,072	85.08%	38	3.02%	922	73.17%	1,260
Miller	1,248	14.41%	7,142	82.46%	271	3.13%	5,894	68.05%	8,661
Mississippi	541	18.97%	2,257	79.14%	54	1.89%	1,716	60.17%	2,852
Moniteau	793	15.60%	4,127	81.18%	164	3.23%	3,334	65.58%	5,084
Monroe	566	18.06%	2,487	79.36%	81	2.58%	1,921	61.30%	3,134
Montgomery	759	18.70%	3,210	79.10%	89	2.19%	2,451	60.40%	4,058
Morgan	1,270	18.55%	5,365	78.37%	211	3.08%	4,095	59.82%	6,846
New Madrid	917	21.00%	3,375	77.30%	74	1.69%	2,458	56.30%	4,366
Newton	3,569	17.92%	15,917	79.90%	435	2.18%	12,348	61.98%	19,921
Nodaway	1,807	25.80%	5,032	71.84%	165	2.36%	3,225	46.05%	7,004
Oregon	496	16.26%	2,500	81.94%	55	1.80%	2,004	65.68%	3,051
Osage	636	11.55%	4,776	86.71%	96	1.74%	4,140	75.16%	5,508
Ozark	496	13.50%	3,087	84.00%	92	2.50%	2,591	70.50%	3,675
Pemiscot	678	21.19%	2,490	77.84%	31	0.97%	1,812	56.64%	3,199
Perry	984	15.63%	5,214	82.83%	97	1.54%	4,230	67.20%	6,295
Pettis	2,812	21.57%	9,757	74.84%	469	3.60%	6,945	53.27%	13,038
Phelps	3,509	25.87%	9,627	70.99%	426	3.14%	6,118	45.11%	13,562
Pike	1,068	20.77%	3,939	76.62%	134	2.61%	2,871	55.85%	5,141
Platte	17,909	43.76%	21,843	53.37%	1,172	2.86%	3,934	9.61%	40,924
Polk	1,835	17.42%	8,382	79.56%	318	3.02%	6,547	62.15%	10,535
Pulaski	1,845	19.87%	7,054	75.98%	385	4.15%	5,209	56.11%	9,284
Putnam	217	12.76%	1,410	82.94%	73	4.29%	1,193	70.18%	1,700
Ralls	780	19.67%	3,076	77.56%	110	2.77%	2,296	57.89%	3,966
Randolph	1,573	21.29%	5,579	75.50%	237	3.21%	4,006	54.22%	7,389
Ray	1,999	25.56%	5,490	70.20%	332	4.24%	3,491	44.64%	7,821
Reynolds	420	17.90%	1,885	80.35%	41	1.75%	1,465	62.45%	2,346
Ripley	561	15.11%	3,077	82.89%	74	1.99%	2,516	67.78%	3,712
Saline	1,661	26.61%	4,297	68.83%	285	4.57%	2,636	42.22%	6,243
Schuyler	238	15.76%	1,215	80.46%	57	3.77%	977	64.70%	1,510
Scotland	222	16.34%	1,105	81.31%	32	2.35%	883	64.97%	1,359
Scott	2,006	17.33%	9,392	81.13%	178	1.54%	7,386	63.80%	11,576
Shannon	513	17.81%	2,318	80.46%	50	1.74%	1,805	62.65%	2,881
Shelby	405	17.72%	1,809	79.17%	71	3.11%	1,404	61.44%	2,285
St. Charles	54,456	36.49%	90,102	60.37%	4,694	3.15%	35,646	23.88%	149,252
St. Clair	693	18.81%	2,877	78.07%	115	3.12%	2,184	59.27%	3,685
St. Francois	4,368	24.14%	13,195	72.94%	528	2.92%	8,827	48.79%	18,091
St. Louis City	66,095	79.44%	14,662	17.62%	2,439	2.93%	-51,433	-61.82%	83,196
St. Louis County	202,506	55.32%	152,902	41.77%	10,681	2.92%	-49,604	-13.55%	366,089
Ste. Genevieve	1,823	28.09%	4,490	69.18%	177	2.73%	2,667	41.09%	6,490
Stoddard	1,056	12.25%	7,436	86.25%	129	1.50%	6,380	74.01%	8,621
Stone	2,220	16.15%	11,255	81.86%	274	1.99%	9,035	65.71%	13,749
Sullivan	299	17.25%	1,402	80.90%	32	1.85%	1,103	63.65%	1,733
Taney	3,091	17.45%	14,224	80.32%	395	2.23%	11,133	62.86%	17,710
Texas	1,128	13.74%	6,879	83.80%	202	2.46%	5,751	70.06%	8,209
Vernon	1,151	18.84%	4,826	79.01%	131	2.14%	3,675	60.17%	6,108
Warren	3,132	23.93%	9,553	72.98%	404	3.09%	6,421	49.06%	13,089
Washington	1,198	17.52%	5,446	79.67%	192	2.81%	4,248	62.14%	6,836
Wayne	560	13.82%	3,439	84.89%	52	1.28%	2,879	71.07%	4,051
Webster	2,493	17.63%	11,235	79.44%	415	2.93%	8,742	61.81%	14,143
Worth	160	18.63%	673	78.35%	26	3.03%	513	59.72%	859
Wright	685	11.01%	5,375	86.43%	159	2.56%	4,690	75.41%	6,219
Totals	772,005	37.61%	1,219,553	59.41%	61,336	2.99%	447,548	21.80%	2,052,894

Counties that flipped from Democratic to Republican

- Buchanan (largest city: St. Joseph)
- Callway (largest city: Fulton)
- Clay (largest city: Kansas City)
- Cole (largest city: Jefferson City)
- Greene (largest city: Springfield)
- Howard (largest city: Fayette)
- Platte (largest city: Kansas City)
- St. Charles (largest city: O'Fallon)
- Sainte Genevieve (largest city: Ste. Genevieve)

==== By congressional district ====
Fitzpatrick won six of eight congressional districts.

District	Green	Fitzpatrick	Representative
1st			Cori Bush
2nd	41%	56%	Ann Wagner
3rd			Blaine Luetkemeyer
4th			Vicky Hartzler (117th Congress)
4th			Mark Alford (118th Congress)
5th			Emanuel Cleaver
6th			Sam Graves
7th			Billy Long (117th Congress)
7th			Eric Burlison (118th Congress)
8th			Jason Smith

== Notes ==
Partisan clients
