= 2024 Vermont State Treasurer election =

- November 5, 2024
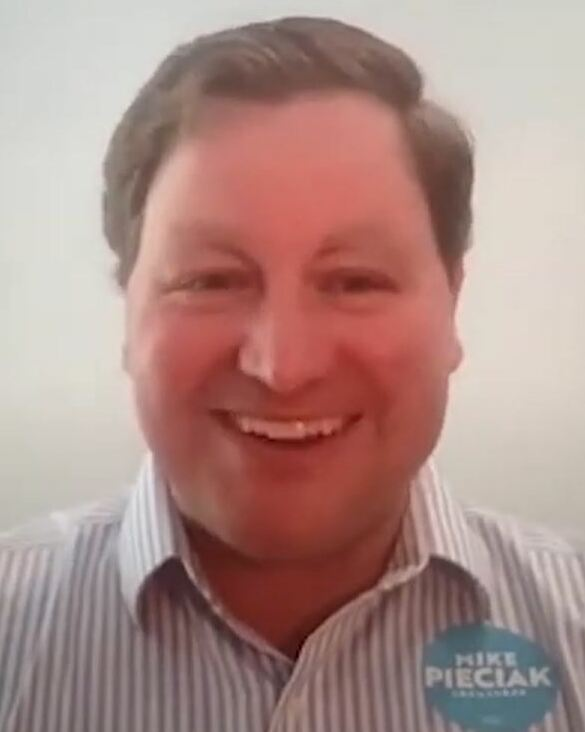

Nominee	Mike Pieciak	Joshua Bechhoefer
Party	Democratic	Republican
Popular vote	211,134	135,763
Percentage	60.79%	39.09%
- Pieciak: 50–60% 60–70% 70–80% 80–90% Bechhoefer: 50–60% 60–70% 70–80% Tie: 40–50%
State Treasurer before election
Mike Pieciak
Democratic
Elected State Treasurer
Mike Pieciak
Democratic

The 2024 Vermont State Treasurer election took place on November 5, 2024, to elect the Vermont state treasurer. Incumbent Democratic treasurer Mike Pieciak won a second two-year term. He defeated Republican nominee Joshua Bechhoefer in the general election.

== Democratic primary ==
=== Candidates ===
==== Nominee ====
- Mike Pieciak, incumbent state treasurer

=== Results ===
Democratic primary results
Party	Candidate	Votes	%
Democratic	Mike Pieciak (incumbent)	45,358	99.52%
Write-in		221	0.48%
Total votes		45,579	100.00%

== Republican primary ==
=== Candidates ===
==== Nominee ====
- Joshua Bechhoefer

=== Results ===
Republican primary results
Party	Candidate	Votes	%
Republican	Joshua Bechhoefer	19,286	97.27%
Write-in		542	2.73%
Total votes		19,828	100.00%

== General election ==
=== Results ===
2024 Vermont State Treasurer election
Party	Candidate	Votes	%
Democratic	Mike Pieciak (incumbent)	211,134	60.79%
Republican	Joshua Bechhoefer	135,763	39.09%
Write-in		415	0.12%
Total votes		347,312	100.00

==== By county ====
County	Mike Pieciak Democratic		Joshua Bechhoefer Republican		Various candidates Other parties	
County	#	%	#	%	#	%
Addison	12,752	59.11%	8,793	40.76%	28	0.13%
Bennington	10,913	56.76%	8,292	43.12%	23	0.12%
Caledonia	8,036	51.13%	7,664	48.77%	16	0.1%
Chittenden	65,271	72.02%	25,228	27.84%	128	0.14%
Essex	1,231	38.18%	1,991	61.76%	2	0.06%
Franklin	11,947	46.94%	13,470	52.93%	33	0.13%
Grand Isle	2,615	55.03%	2,132	44.87%	5	0.11%
Lamoille	8,360	60.19%	5,516	39.71%	13	0.09%
Orange	9,148	54.72%	7,552	45.17%	19	0.11%
Orleans	6,477	46.44%	7,461	53.5%	8	0.06%
Rutland	15,191	47.03%	17,084	52.89%	28	0.09%
Washington	22,347	66.86%	11,024	32.98%	55	0.16%
Windham	17,249	70.86%	7,062	29.01%	31	0.13%
Windsor	19,597	61.02%	12,494	38.9%	26	0.08%
Totals	211,134	60.79%	135,763	39.09%	415	0.12%

Counties that flipped from Democratic to Republican

- Franklin (largest city: St. Albans)
- Rutland (largest city: Rutland)
- Orleans (largest city: Derby)
