= Larry Pack =

American politician, accountant, and businessman

26th Treasurer of West Virginia
- Incumbent
- Assumed office January 3, 2025
- Governor: Jim Justice; Patrick Morrisey
- Preceded by: Riley Moore

West Virginia Secretary of Revenue
- In office December 13, 2023 – January 3, 2025
- Governor: Jim Justice
- Preceded by: Dave Hardy
- Succeeded by: John Myers (acting)

Member of the West Virginia House of Delegates from the 35th district
- In office December 1, 2020 – August 8, 2022
- Preceded by: Andrew Byrd; Eric Nelson
- Succeeded by: Andrew Anderson

Personal details
- Born: November 9, 1957 (age 68) Charleston, West Virginia, U.S.
- Party: Republican
- Spouse: Lisa
- Children: 6
- Education: West Virginia University Institute of Technology (BS)

Larry Pack (born November 9, 1957) is an American politician, accountant, and businessman who is currently serving as the 26th Treasurer of West Virginia since 2025. Before his career in state politics he served as Recorder for the City of Marmet from 1981 to 1987. He was elected State Treasurer unopposed in 2024, and was appointed to the position by Governor Jim Justice after his predecessor, Riley Moore, resigned to become a United States representative. As a Republican, he has served as West Virginia's acting Secretary of Revenue from December 2023 until his appointment as Treasurer. He was elected as a member of the West Virginia House of Delegates as a Republican in 2020 and served until his resignation in 2022. After his resignation, Pack worked as a senior advisor to Jim Justice until his appointment as Revenue Secretary.

== Early life and education ==
Pack was born and raised in Charleston, West Virginia. He earned a Bachelor of Science degree in accounting from the West Virginia University Institute of Technology.

== Career ==
From 1979 to 1991, Pack worked as a Certified Public Accountant at Herman & Company. From 1991 to 2009, he was the co-founder and partner of Pack Lambert & Burdette. Since 2009, he has been the CEO of Stonerise, a healthcare company. He also worked as secretary of the West Virginia Healthcare Association. In 2017, Pack was elected as West Virginia's committeeman to the Republican National Committee. Pack was elected to the West Virginia House of Delegates in November 2020 and assumed office on December 1, 2020.

With Chad Lovejoy, Pack managed a bipartisan workgroup aimed at reducing hunger in West Virginia.

In 2022, Pack resigned from the House of Delegates to join the Justice administration as a senior advisor. In late 2023, Justice appointed him as acting Revenue Secretary.

In 2023, Pack announced his candidacy for Treasurer of West Virginia after incumbent Treasurer Riley Moore chose to run for Congress. Pack won the election unopposed, and was appointed to the position by Governor Jim Justice 10 days early as a result of Moore becoming a U.S. Representative.

== Personal life ==
Pack and his wife, Lisa, have six children and two grandchildren. Pack and his family are members of Bible Center Church, a non-denominational church in Charleston, West Virginia. Pack also sits on the church's elder board.

Party political offices
Preceded by Riley Moore	Republican nominee for Treasurer of West Virginia; 2024	Most recent
Political offices
Preceded by Riley Moore	Treasurer of West Virginia; 2025–present	Incumbent
