= Scott Fitzpatrick =

American politician (born 1987)

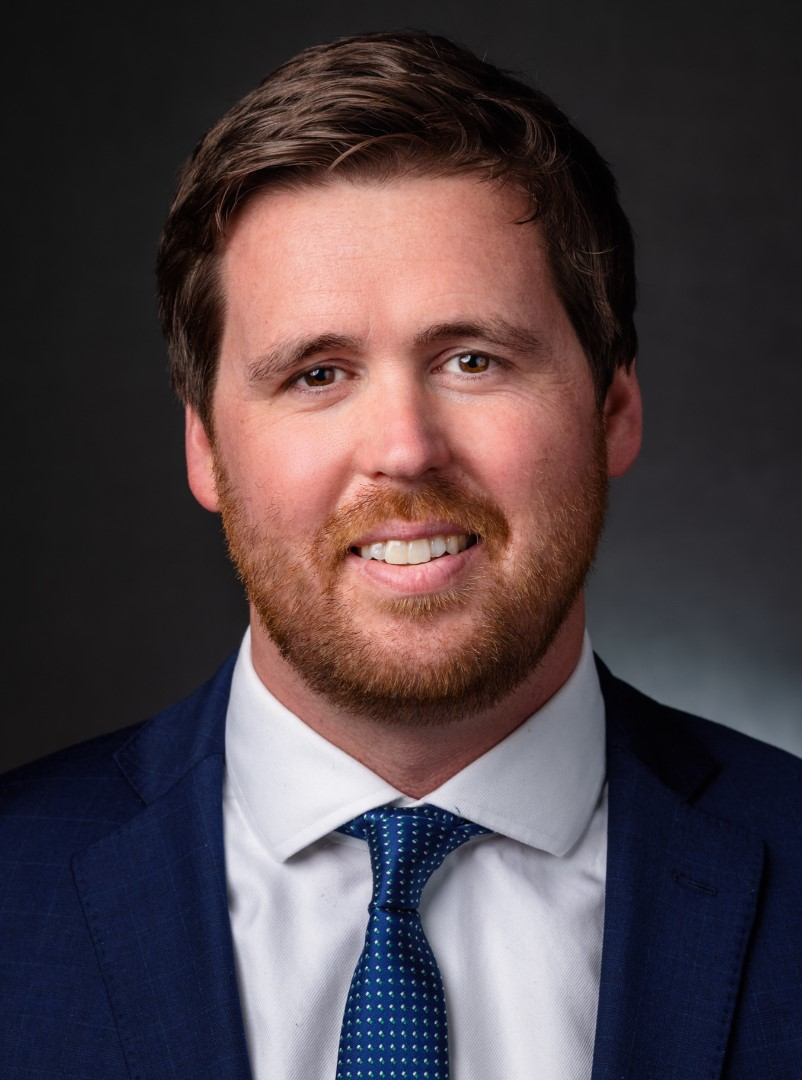
- Official portrait, 2021

39th Auditor of Missouri
- Incumbent
- Assumed office January 9, 2023
- Governor: Mike Parson; Mike Kehoe
- Preceded by: Nicole Galloway

47th Treasurer of Missouri
- In office January 14, 2019 – January 9, 2023
- Governor: Mike Parson
- Preceded by: Eric Schmitt
- Succeeded by: Vivek Malek

Member of the Missouri House of Representatives from the 158th district
- In office January 9, 2013 – January 14, 2019
- Preceded by: Wayne Wallingford
- Succeeded by: Scott Cupps

Personal details
- Born: September 28, 1987 (age 38) Springfield, Missouri, U.S.
- Party: Republican
- Spouse: Mallory
- Children: 2
- Education: University of Missouri (BS)

Scott Fitzpatrick (born September 28, 1987) is an American politician serving as the state auditor of Missouri since 2023. A Republican, he previously served as Missouri State Treasurer from 2019 to 2023 and represented Missouri's 158th District in the Missouri House of Representatives from 2013 to 2019.

In December 2018, Governor Mike Parson appointed Fitzpatrick to become state treasurer, following the appointment of the previous state treasurer Eric Schmitt as state attorney general effective in January 2019. Fitzpatrick took his new office on January 14, 2019. He was elected to a full term as treasurer in November 2020, defeating former state representative Vicki Englund.

== Early life and education ==
Fitzpatrick was raised in Shell Knob, Missouri, and graduated from Cassville High School in 2006. He attended the University of Missouri, graduating in 2010.

== Career ==
Fitzpatrick founded marine products company MariCorp U.S. in 2003, and is its CEO. Initially a marina and dock repair firm, the company grew into regional contracting and national production, centering on the inland commercial marina market, before entering general and government contracting.

Fitzpatrick was first elected to the Missouri House of Representatives in 2012 and served from January 2013, winning reelection in 2014, 2016, and 2018 (where he ran unopposed). He represented Barry, Lawrence, and Stone Counties. In addition to serving as Chairman of the Budget Committee, he also served on the Joint Committee on Legislative Research and Public Assistance. He currently lives in Cassville, Missouri.

After former Attorney General Josh Hawley won the November 2018 election for U.S. Senator, Governor Mike Parson appointed State Treasurer Eric Schmitt as Attorney General in January 2019, creating a vacancy in the Office of State Treasurer. Likewise, on December 19, 2018, Governor Parson subsequently appointed Fitzpatrick to the office of state treasurer. Fitzpatrick assumed office as state treasurer with a swearing-in ceremony on January 14, 2019. Fitzpatrick began campaigning for a full term as state treasurer in November 2019. He defeated three other candidates in the 2020 Missouri State Treasurer election. In July 2021, Fitzpatrick declared his candidacy for the 2022 Missouri State Auditor election. He was the first person to do so after Nicole Galloway stated that she would not run for a second term.

== Electoral history ==
=== State representative ===
Missouri House of Representatives Republican Primary Election, August 7, 2012, District 158
Party	Candidate	Votes	%	±%
Republican	Scott Fitzpatrick	2,789	41.88%	
Republican	Mike Bennett	2,235	33.56%	
Republican	Frank Washburn	1,635	24.55%	

Missouri House of Representatives Election, November 6, 2012, District 158
Party	Candidate	Votes	%	±%
Republican	Scott Fitzpatrick	10,568	79.65%	−20.35
Constitution	Sue Beck	2,700	20.35%	+20.35

Missouri House of Representatives Election, November 4, 2014, District 158
Party	Candidate	Votes	%	±%
Republican	Scott Fitzpatrick	6,583	100.00%	+20.35

Missouri House of Representatives Election, November 8, 2016, District 158
Party	Candidate	Votes	%	±%
Republican	Scott Fitzpatrick	13,778	100.00%	

Missouri House of Representatives Election, November 6, 2018, District 158
Party	Candidate	Votes	%	±%
Republican	Scott Fitzpatrick	11,348	100.00%	

=== State Treasurer ===
Missouri Treasurer Election, November 3, 2020
Party	Candidate	Votes	%	±%
Republican	Scott Fitzpatrick	1,742,943	59.10	
Democratic	Vicki Lorenz Englund	1,122,547	38.06	
Libertarian	Nick Kasoff	64,615	2.19	
Green	Joseph Civettini	19,107	0.65	

=== State Auditor ===
Missouri Auditor Republican primary, August 2, 2022
Party	Candidate	Votes	%	±%
Republican	Scott Fitzpatrick	378,915	64.69%	
Republican	David Gregory	206,868	35.31%	
Total votes		585,783	100	

Missouri Auditor Election, November 8, 2022
Party	Candidate	Votes	%	±%
Republican	Scott Fitzpatrick	1,219,553	59.41%	
Democratic	Alan Green	772,005	37.61%	
Libertarian	John Hartwig, Jr.	61,329	2.99%	
Write-In	Arnie Dienoff	7	0.00%	
Total votes		2,052,894	100.00	

Party political offices
Preceded by Eric Schmitt	Republican nominee for Treasurer of Missouri; 2020	Succeeded by Vivek Malek
Preceded by Saundra McDowell	Republican nominee for Auditor of Missouri; 2022, 2026	Most recent
Political offices
Preceded by Eric Schmitt	Treasurer of Missouri; 2019–2023	Succeeded by Vivek Malek
Preceded by Nicole Galloway	Auditor of Missouri; 2023–present	Incumbent
