= 2022 Utah State Treasurer special election =

2022 Utah Treasurer special election
- November 8, 2022
- Turnout: 51.51%
Candidate	Marlo Oaks	Joseph Buchman
Party	Republican	Libertarian
Popular vote	726,482	97,171
Percentage	74.11%	9.91%
Candidate	Thomas Horne	Warren Rogers
Party	United Utah	Independent American
Popular vote	94,265	62,295
Percentage	9.62%	6.36%
- Oaks: 30–40% 40–50% 50–60% 60–70% 70–80% 80–90% >90% Buchman: 30–40% 40–50% 60–70% >90% Horne: 30–40% 50–60% 60–70% >90% Rogers: 50–60% 60–70% >90% Tie: 30–40% 50% No votes
State Treasurer before election
Marlo Oaks
Republican
Elected State Treasurer
Marlo Oaks
Republican

The 2022 Utah State Treasurer special election took place on November 8, 2022, to elect the Utah State Treasurer. It was scheduled due to the resignation of the previously elected Treasurer David Damschen in April 2021. It saw the election of Marlo Oaks, the acting treasurer appointed by Spencer Cox.

No candidate was nominated from the Democratic Party. Libertarian Joseph Buchman, UUP nominee Thomas Horne, and IAP party nominee Warren Rogers each got more than 5% of the vote, a strong third party performance.

== Candidates ==
- Joseph Buchman, former chair of the Utah Libertarian Party and perennial candidate (Libertarian Party)
- Thomas Horne, writer (United Utah Party)
- Marlo Oaks, acting state treasurer and former capital management executive (Republican Party)
- Warren Rogers, perennial candidate (Independent American Party)

== General election ==
=== Results ===
2022 Utah State Treasurer election
Party	Candidate	Votes	%	±%
Republican	Marlo Oaks (incumbent)	726,482	74.11%	−0.46%
Libertarian	Joseph Buchman	97,171	9.91%	−4.98%
United Utah	Thomas Horne	94,265	9.62%	+9.62%
Independent American	Warren Rogers	62,295	6.36%	−4.18%
Total votes		980,213	100.0%	
Republican hold				

==== By county ====
County	Marlo Oaks Republican		Joseph Buchman Libertarian		Thomas Alan Horne United Utah		Warren Rogers Independent American	
County	#	%	#	%	#	%	#	%
Beaver	2,026	87.25%	122	5.25%	111	4.78%	63	2.71%
Box Elder	16,462	86.07%	1,214	6.35%	687	3.59%	764	3.99%
Cache	30,956	80.90%	3,189	8.33%	2,187	5.72%	1,934	5.05%
Carbon	4,823	76.22%	661	10.45%	367	5.80%	477	7.54%
Daggett	409	85.74%	30	6.29%	13	2.73%	25	5.24%
Davis	86,174	75.64%	8,502	7.46%	10,242	8.99%	9,009	7.91%
Duchesne	5,482	90.40%	248	4.09%	102	1.68%	232	3.83%
Emery	3,542	90.63%	191	4.89%	77	1.97%	98	2.51%
Garfield	1,915	86.93%	104	4.72%	92	4.18%	92	4.18%
Grand	2,326	59.46%	634	16.21%	500	12.78%	452	11.55%
Iron	13,849	83.79%	1,277	7.73%	871	5.27%	531	3.21%
Juab	3,994	87.95%	211	4.65%	175	3.85%	161	3.55%
Kane	2,794	84.92%	196	5.96%	127	3.86%	173	5.26%
Millard	4,402	88.66%	186	3.75%	200	4.03%	177	3.56%
Morgan	4,327	87.54%	282	5.71%	162	3.28%	172	3.48%
Piute	680	91.28%	33	4.43%	16	2.15%	16	2.15%
Rich	934	89.72%	46	4.42%	32	3.07%	29	2.79%
Salt Lake	211,401	63.07%	44,278	13.21%	53,646	16.01%	25,850	7.71%
San Juan	3,313	63.39%	744	14.24%	465	8.90%	704	13.47%
Sanpete	8,288	86.32%	451	4.70%	509	5.30%	354	3.69%
Sevier	6,817	90.21%	304	4.02%	231	3.06%	205	2.71%
Summit	11,183	67.32%	2,557	15.39%	1,414	8.51%	1,458	8.78%
Tooele	16,063	77.22%	1,981	9.52%	1,409	6.77%	1,348	6.48%
Uintah	9,420	89.85%	518	4.94%	209	1.99%	337	3.21%
Utah	157,407	82.23%	13,192	6.89%	12,086	6.31%	8,742	4.57%
Wasatch	9,514	78.93%	1,146	9.51%	591	4.90%	803	6.66%
Washington	54,104	82.74%	5,813	8.89%	2,338	3.58%	3,133	4.79%
Wayne	1,207	84.52%	73	5.11%	73	5.11%	75	5.25%
Weber	52,670	73.28%	8,988	12.51%	5,333	7.42%	4,881	6.79%
Totals	726,482	74.11%	97,171	9.91%	94,265	9.62%	62,295	6.36%
