= 2024 West Virginia State Treasurer election =

- November 5, 2024
Nominee	Larry Pack
Party	Republican
Popular vote	602,718
Percentage	99.93%
- County results Pack: >90%
State Treasurer before election
Riley Moore
Republican
Elected State Treasurer
Larry Pack
Republican

The 2024 West Virginia State Treasurer election took place on November 5, 2024, to elect the next state treasurer of West Virginia. Incumbent Republican treasurer Riley Moore chose not to seek re-election, instead successfully running for U.S. House. Primary elections took place on May 14, 2024.

== Republican primary ==
=== Candidates ===
==== Nominee ====
- Larry Pack, acting West Virginia Secretary of Revenue (2023–2025) and former state delegate from the 35th district (2020–2022)

==== Declined ====
- Riley Moore, incumbent state treasurer (ran for U.S. House)

=== Results ===
Republican primary results
Party	Candidate	Votes	%
Republican	Larry Pack	166,648	100.00%
Total votes		166,648	100.00%

== General election ==
=== Results ===
2024 West Virginia State Treasurer election
Party	Candidate	Votes	%
Republican	Larry Pack	602,718	99.93%
Write-in		444	0.07%
Total votes		603,162	100.00%
Republican hold			

==== By county ====
County	Larry Pack Republican	
County	#	%
Barbour	5,298	100.00%
Berkeley	44,958	100.00%
Boone	6,618	100.00%
Braxton	4,139	100.00%
Brooke	7,788	100.00%
Cabell	26,419	100.00%
Calhoun	2,287	100.00%
Clay	2,673	100.00%
Doddridge	2,570	100.00%
Fayette	12,302	100.00%
Gilmer	1,871	100.00%
Grant	4,614	100.00%
Greenbrier	11,851	100.00%
Hampshire	8,785	100.00%
Hancock	10,688	100.00%
Hardy	5,310	100.00%
Harrison	23,634	100.00%
Jackson	10,732	100.00%
Jefferson	21,663	100.00%
Kanawha	55,122	100.00%
Lewis	5,952	100.00%
Lincoln	5,915	100.00%
Logan	8,742	100.00%
Marion	19,213	100.00%
Marshall	10,977	100.00%
Mason	8,868	100.00%
McDowell	3,961	100.00%
Mercer	19,727	100.00%
Mineral	11,118	100.00%
Mingo	6,758	100.00%
Monongalia	29,752	100.00%
Monroe	5,414	100.00%
Morgan	7,376	100.00%
Nicholas	8,176	100.00%
Ohio	14,509	100.00%
Pendleton	2,696	100.00%
Pleasants	2,791	100.00%
Pocahontas	2,972	100.00%
Preston	11,921	100.00%
Putnam	21,909	100.00%
Raleigh	25,208	100.00%
Randolph	9,140	100.00%
Ritchie	3,390	100.00%
Roane	4,571	100.00%
Summers	4,234	100.00%
Taylor	6,123	100.00%
Tucker	2,779	100.00%
Tyler	3,127	100.00%
Upshur	8,159	100.00%
Wayne	12,214	100.00%
Webster	2,361	100.00%
Wetzel	4,931	100.00%
Wirt	2,168	100.00%
Wood	29,896	100.00%
Wyoming	6,348	100.00%
Totals	602,718	100.00%

Counties that flipped from Democratic to Republican

- Cabell (largest city: Huntington)
- Clay (largest city: Clay)
- Monongalia (largest city: Morgantown)
- Kanawha (largest city: Charleston)
- Logan (largest borough: Logan)
- Boone (largest city: Madison)
- Braxton (largest town: Sutton)
