= Mike Pieciak =

American politician (born 1983)

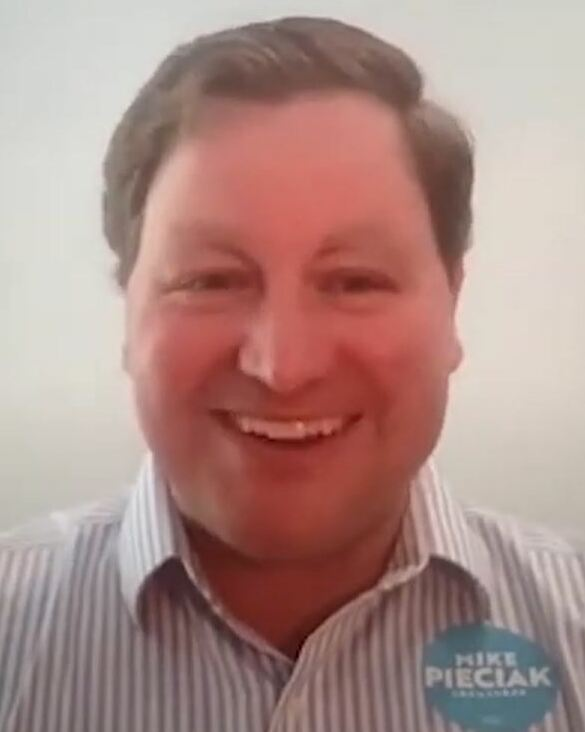

31st Treasurer of Vermont
- Incumbent
- Assumed office January 5, 2023
- Governor: Phil Scott
- Preceded by: Beth Pearce

Personal details
- Born: Michael Sullivan Pieciak; June 21, 1983 (age 43) Brattleboro, Vermont, U.S.
- Party: Democratic
- Domestic partner: Will Holder
- Education: Union College (BA); University of Miami (JD)

Michael Sullivan Pieciak (born June 21, 1983) is an American politician from Vermont. A member of the Democratic Party, Pieciak has served as Vermont State Treasurer since January 2023.

== Early life and career ==
Michael Sullivan Pieciak was born in Brattleboro, Vermont on June 21, 1983, a son of Joseph S. and Carolyn (Sullivan) Pieciak. He attended the schools of Brattleboro and is a 2002 graduate of Northfield Mount Hermon School in Gill, Massachusetts. He graduated from Union College in 2006, where he played on the football team. Pieciak was a volunteer staffer at the 2004 Democratic National Convention and was a Hillary Clinton delegate at the 2008 Democratic National Convention.

In 2009, Pieciak earned his Juris Doctor degree summa cum laude from the University of Miami School of Law. While in law school, he was the 2008–2009 editor-in-chief of the Miami Law Review and a member of the Miami Moot Court Board. In addition, he interned at the school's Children and Youth Law Clinic. Pieciak was also inducted into the Iron Arrow Honor Society and joined the Phi Delta Phi honor society.

Pieciak was admitted to the bar in 2011 and became an associate at the Downs Rachlin and Martin law firm in Burlington. In 2012, he managed the reelection campaign of William Sorrell, the Vermont Attorney General. He subsequently practiced mergers and acquisitions law with Skadden, Arps, Slate, Meagher & Flom in New York City.

In February 2014, Pieciak joined the Vermont Department of Financial Regulation (DFR) when Governor Peter Shumlin appointed him as deputy commissioner of the securities division. Shumlin appointed him as commissioner in July 2016 and Governor Phil Scott reappointed him in January 2017. In 2020, Scott appointed Pieciak to his COVID response leadership team. Pieciak resigned as DFR commissioner in April 2022.

== Vermont State Treasurer ==
In May 2022, incumbent state treasurer Beth Pearce announced that she would not run for reelection. A few days later, Pieciak announced that he would be a candidate in the 2022 Vermont elections. After winning the Democratic nomination, he faced Republican H. Brooke Paige in the general election. Pieciak defeated Paige, 62% to 33%. He took office in January 2023. Pieciak won a second two-year term in November 2024.

== Personal life ==
Pieciak and his partner, Will Holder, live in Winooski.

Party political offices
Preceded by Beth Pearce	Democratic nominee for Treasurer of Vermont; 2022, 2024	Most recent
Political offices
Preceded by Beth Pearce	Treasurer of Vermont; 2023–present	Incumbent
