= Beth Pearce =

American politician

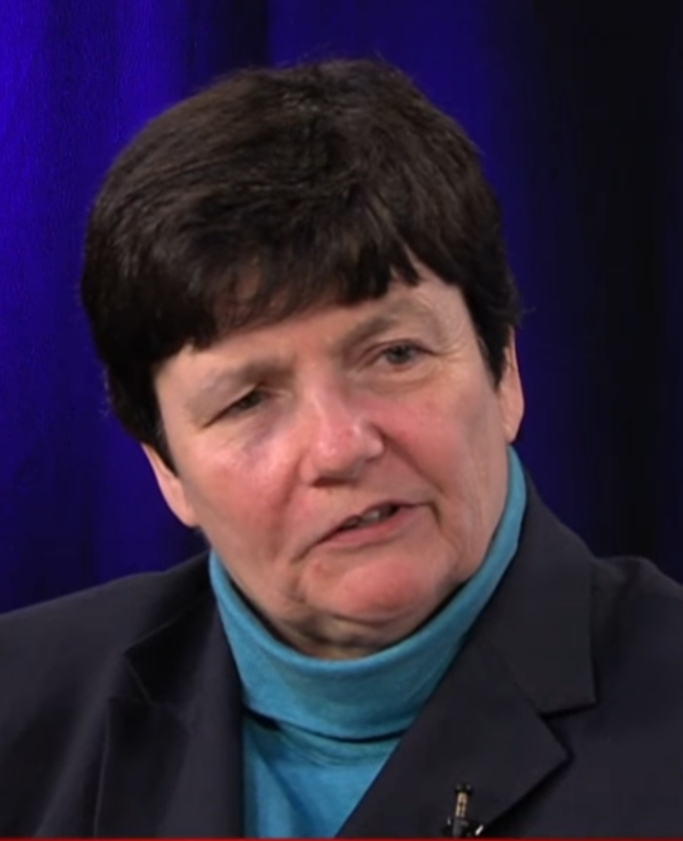

30th Treasurer of Vermont
- In office January 6, 2011 – January 5, 2023
- Governor: Peter Shumlin; Phil Scott
- Preceded by: Jeb Spaulding
- Succeeded by: Mike Pieciak

Personal details
- Born: Elizabeth A. Pearce; 1952 or 1953 (age 71–72); West Springfield, Massachusetts, U.S.
- Political party: Democratic
- Education: University of New Hampshire (BA)

Elizabeth A. Pearce (born 1952/1953) is an American politician from Vermont who served as Vermont State Treasurer.

== Biography ==
Beth Pearce resides in Barre. She received her Bachelor of Arts degree from the University of New Hampshire.

She was appointed Vermont State Treasurer by Governor Peter Shumlin in January, 2011. Pearce succeeded Jeb Spaulding, who was appointed Secretary of Administration.

Beginning in 2003, Pearce served as Vermont's Deputy Treasurer.

Prior to her appointment as Deputy Treasurer, Pearce served as Deputy Treasurer for Cash Management in the office of the Massachusetts State Treasurer (1999–2003); Deputy Comptroller for the Town of Greenburgh, New York; and as the Accounting Manager and Financial Operations Manager for the Town of West Hartford, Connecticut.

Pearce also served as a fiscal officer with the Massachusetts Department of Social Services and as a project director for the Massachusetts Office of Human Services. She officially endorsed Bernie Sanders' 2020 presidential campaign.

== Electoral history ==
Vermont Treasurer Election, 2012
Party	Candidate	Votes	%
Democratic	Beth Pearce (inc.)	147,556	52.4
Republican	Wendy Wilton	114,797	40.7
Progressive	Don Schramm	12,489	4.4
Liberty Union	Jessica Diamondstone	6,937	2.5
Write-ins	Write-ins	79	0.0

Vermont Treasurer Election, 2014
Party	Candidate	Votes	%
Democratic	Beth Pearce (inc.)	124,119	74.4
Progressive	Don Schramm	28,990	17.4
Liberty Union	Murray Ngoima	13,456	8.1
Write-ins	Write-ins	265	0.2

Vermont Treasurer Election, 2018
Party	Candidate	Votes	%
Democratic	Beth Pearce (inc.)	179,451	67.6
Republican	Rick Morton	85,824	32.3
Write-ins	Write-ins	161	0.6

== Notes ==
Party political offices
Preceded by Jeb Spaulding	Democratic nominee for Vermont State Treasurer; 2012, 2014, 2016, 2018, 2020	Succeeded by Mike Pieciak
Preceded by Wendy Wilton	Republican nominee for Vermont State Treasurer; 2014, 2016	Succeeded by H. Brooke Paige
Political offices
Preceded by Jeb Spaulding	Treasurer of Vermont; 2011–2023	Succeeded by Mike Pieciak
