= Steven Tilley =

American politician

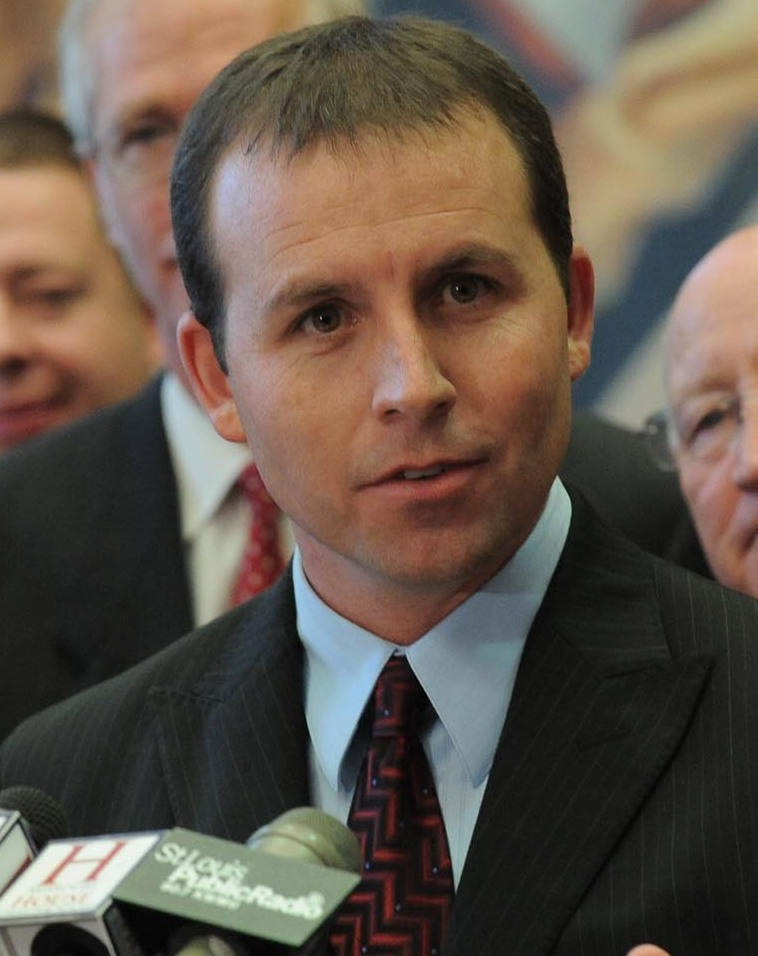

72nd Speaker of the Missouri House of Representatives
- In office January 5, 2011 – August 13, 2012
- Preceded by: Ron Richard
- Succeeded by: Shane Schoeller

Majority Leader of the Missouri House of Representatives
- In office January 9, 2008 – January 5, 2011
- Preceded by: Tom Dempsey
- Succeeded by: Tim Jones

Member of the Missouri House of Representatives from the 106th district
- In office January 5, 2005 – August 13, 2012
- Preceded by: Kevin P. Engler
- Succeeded by: Chrissy Sommer

Personal details
- Born: June 11, 1971 (age 55) Wiesbaden, West Germany
- Party: Republican
- Children: Kourtney Tilley, Korrin Tilley
- Education: Southeast Missouri State University (B.S., 1994), University of Missouri–St. Louis (Doctorate of Optometry, 1998)
- Occupation: Optometrist

Steven Tilley (born June 11, 1971) is an American lobbyist and former Speaker of the Missouri House of Representatives. He represented District 106 (Perry, St. Francois and Ste. Genevieve Counties) in the Missouri House of Representatives. A Republican, Tilley was elected to the House in November 2004. He became the Majority leader in January 2008. On August 13, 2012, Tilley resigned from the Missouri House of Representatives.

Tilley was elected Speaker on November 4, 2010, after the Republicans picked up 17 seats in the 2010 election. On December 13, 2010, five weeks after being elected Speaker, Tilley altered his campaign committee in order to run for Lieutenant Governor of Missouri in 2012.

== Background and education ==
=== Education ===
A 1989 graduate of Perryville High School in Perryville, Missouri, Tilley received a Bachelor of Science degree from Southeast Missouri State University in 1994 and received his Doctorate of Optometry from the University of Missouri-St. Louis School of Optometry in 1998.

=== Personal life ===
Tilley lives in Perryville. He has two children: Kourtney and Korrin. Tilley and his wife Kellie filed for divorce on September 14, 2011, after 18 years of marriage.

=== Group memberships ===
Tilley is a member of the Perryville Optimist Club, Missouri Right to Life, National Rifle Association, Missouri Optometric Association, American Optometric Association, N.F.I.B. and the Missouri Chamber of Commerce. He is also a CHAMPS mentor and attends Immanuel Lutheran Church of Perryville.

== Political career ==
Tilley served in the Missouri House from 2005 to 2012. During that time, Tilley has served as the Chairman of the House Special Committee on General Laws, Chairman of the House Ethics Committee and as Majority Floor Leader.

=== Speaker of the Missouri House ===
Republicans in the Missouri House had their biggest majority in history (106–57). Among his most visible events was erecting a statue of Rush Limbaugh in the capitol in the Hall of Famous Missourians.

As Speaker of the House, Tilley served as an ex-officio member of all committees of the House. Additionally, he was specifically assigned to the House Ethics and Administration and Accounts. In August 2012, he resigned as speaker of the Missouri House, five months before his term expired, and dropped out of the lieutenant governor race.

==== Flooding Cairo controversy ====
In April 2011, Speaker Tilley received national media attention for controversial remarks he made about Cairo, Illinois, a poor town on the Illinois side of the Mississippi River. Due to heavy rainfall and high water levels on the river, the U.S. Army Corps of Engineers was considering a plan to destroy a levee on the Missouri side of the river in hopes of lowering the flood level and preventing severe flood damage to Cairo and other downstream areas. Destroying the levee would have flooded several hundred thousand acres of Missouri farmland. When reporters asked if he would rather see Missouri farmland flooded or the town of Cairo, Tilley responded "Cairo. I've been there. Trust me. Cairo." And further said "Have you been to Cairo? OK, then you known what I'm saying." Tilley later issued an apology:

I was asked a question about blowing up a dam in Missouri and the negative consequences that happened to Missouri. As the Speaker of the House, (I believe) my first responsibility is to Missourians. And in my effort to defend them, I went on to say some pretty insensitive and inappropriate remarks about Cairo

When later interviewed by a Missouri television station, Tilley said the accusations that he was a racist are ridiculous and that when one does as many interviews as he does, one is bound to say something stupid. The Corps of Engineers destroyed the levee on May 3, 2011, flooding 130,000 acres of Missouri farmland but saving the town of Cairo from flooding.

=== Lobbyist ===
Tilley formed the lobbyist firm Strategic Capitol Consulting shortly after his term as Speaker ended. Clients have included Conte Enterprise Holdings, and Jefferson County, Missouri.

In 2017, Tilley's PACs raised scrutiny when the city of Independence contracted with multiple Tilley clients following a $10,000 donation to mayor Eileen Weir.

Tilley's role as lobbyist for the University of Missouri System became a point of contention in 2021 following conflict of interest concerns from senior university curator David Steelman, who was later asked to resign by governor Mike Parson.

Tilley is a lobbyist for Torch Electronics, which owns and operates video machines at gas stations and convenience stores, and Warrenton Oil, which operates convenience stores. The legality of the machines are in question due to gray areas in state gambling regulations. Torch spent $657,648 in political donations between 2018 and 2023, primarily through PACs managed by Tilley. In 2022, Tilley organized a fundraiser for attorney general Andrew Bailey who withdrew from a lawsuit between both companies and Missouri State Highway Patrol in 2023. In 2024, state treasurer Vivek Malek told legislators that he chose to place advertisements on Torch machines following a meeting arranged by Tilley in Torch owner Steve Miltenberger's private hanger in Chesterfield.

In 2024, Tilley's clients Torch Electronics and New Day Healthcare donated a total of $120,000 to Lincoln Hough's lieutenant governor campaign by way of six PACs managed by Tilley.

== Electoral history ==
2010 Election for Missouri’s 106th District House of Representatives
| Party | Candidate | Votes | % | ±% |
|---|---|---|---|---|
| Republican | Steven Tilley | 8,394 | 100 | |

2008 Election for Missouri’s 106th District House of Representatives
| Party | Candidate | Votes | % | ±% |
|---|---|---|---|---|
| Republican | Steven Tilley | 12,769 | 100 | |

2006 Election for Missouri’s 106th District House of Representatives
| Party | Candidate | Votes | % | ±% |
|---|---|---|---|---|
| Republican | Steven Tilley | 9,265 | 100 | |

2004 Election for Missouri’s 106th District House of Representatives
| Party | Candidate | Votes | % | ±% |
|---|---|---|---|---|
| Republican | Steven Tilley | 7,847 | 54.5 | |
| Democratic | David Cramp | 6,562 | 45.5 | |

2004 Primary Election for Missouri’s 106th District House of Representatives
| Party | Candidate | Votes | % | ±% |
|---|---|---|---|---|
| Republican | Steven Tilley | 2,600 | 57.7 | |
| Republican | Gary Romine | 1,904 | 42.3 | |

Political offices
| Preceded by Ron Richard | Speaker of the Missouri House of Representatives; 2011–2012 | Succeeded by Shane Schoeller (acting); Tim Jones |
| Preceded by Tom Dempsey | Majority Floor Leader of Missouri House of Representatives; 2008 –2011 | Succeeded by Tim Jones |
Missouri House of Representatives
| Preceded by Kevin P. Engler | 106th District Representative to Missouri House of Representatives; 2005 – | Succeeded by Incumbent |
