= HomeServices of America =

US residential real estate services company

- Industry: Real estate
- Founded: 1998; 28 years ago
- Headquarters: Minneapolis, Minnesota, U.S.
- Key people: Chris Kelly, CEP
- Services: Brokerage; Mortgage; Insurance; Title; Escrow; Franchising; Relocation services
- Number of employees: 6,000
- Parent: Berkshire Hathaway Energy
- Website: www.homeservices.com

HomeServices of America is a residential real estate services company operating in the United States. The company provides real estate brokerage services, mortgage loan origination, franchising, title insurance, escrow and closing services, home warranties, property insurance, casualty insurance and relocation services. It is the second-largest real estate brokerage in the country, behind Compass, Inc.

The company operates under many brand names including HomeServices of America, Huff Realty, Edina Realty, and Long & Foster.

== History ==
=== 1990s ===
In 1998, AmerUs Home Services was acquired by MidAmerican Energy Holdings Company. In 1999, MidAmerican renamed its brokerage business HomeServices and acquired Semonin Realtors, operating in Louisville, and Long Realty, operating in Arizona. In 1999, Berkshire Hathaway acquired MidAmerican Energy Holdings Company.

=== 2000s ===
In 2006, the company acquired Atlanta-based real estate brokerage Harry Norman Realtors.

=== 2010s ===
In 2012, the company acquired real estate brokerage firms from Prudential and Real Living and rebranded Prudential Real Estate to Berkshire Hathaway HomeServices. In August 2013, the company acquired Prudential Fox & Roach, Realtors®/Trident Group. In November 2013, the company acquired Prudential Rubloff Properties, operating in the Chicago area. In May 2014, the company acquired Intero Real Estate Services, operating in Silicon Valley. In July 2015, the company acquired Prudential Centennial Realty, operating in Westchester County, and First Weber, the largest residential brokerage in Wisconsin. In January 2017, the company acquired Houlihan Lawrence, the largest residential brokerage in Westchester County. In April 2017, the company acquired Gloria Nilson & Co. Real Estate, a residential brokerage in New Jersey. The company also formed a strategic alliance with Juwai.com, the largest international property portal in China, offering access to high-net-worth individual Chinese buyers looking to purchase homes. In June 2017, Robert Moline, president of the company, retired. In September 2017, the company acquired Long & Foster. In 2018, the company acquired North Texas real estate firm Ebby Halliday.

=== 2020s ===
In January 2022, through its Edina Realty subsidiary, it acquired Sioux Falls, South Dakota–based Hegg Realtors.

In May 2022, it acquired a minority stake in Title Resources Group.

== Legal issues ==
In November 2023, a federal jury in Kansas City, Missouri, found HomeServices and the National Association of Realtors liable in lawsuits that alleged brokerage firms conspired to inflate commissions. The plaintiffs, who were represented by Michael Ketchmark, were awarded $1.78 billion in damages. In April 2024, the company agreed to pay $250 million to settle the lawsuits.
