= John Diehl (disambiguation) =

John Diehl may refer to:

- John Diehl (born 1950), American actor
- John Diehl (politician) (born 1965), American politician
- John Diehl (American football) (1936–2012), American football player
