= Andrew Bailey (politician) =

American politician and attorney (born 1981)

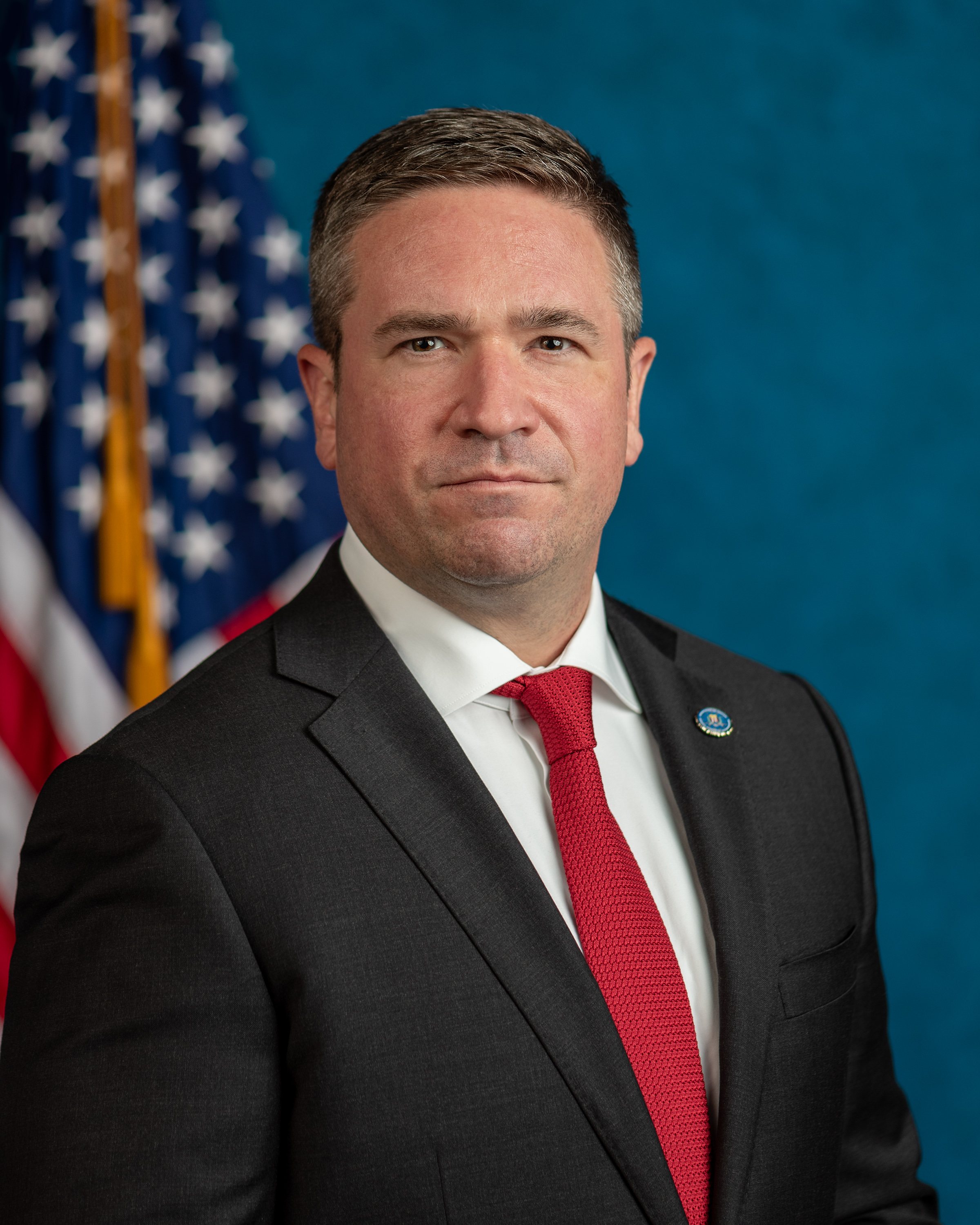
- Official portrait, 2025

Co-Deputy Director of the Federal Bureau of Investigation
- In office September 15, 2025 – October 2, 2026
- President: Donald Trump
- Director: Kash Patel
- Preceded by: Dan Bongino (as sole deputy)
- Succeeded by: Christopher Raia (as sole deputy)

44th Attorney General of Missouri
- In office January 3, 2023 – September 8, 2025
- Governor: Mike Parson; Mike Kehoe
- Preceded by: Eric Schmitt
- Succeeded by: Catherine Hanaway

Personal details
- Born: 1981 (age 44–45)
- Party: Republican
- Spouse: Jessica Bailey
- Children: 4
- Education: University of Missouri (BA, JD)
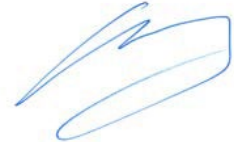
- Signature

Military service
- Branch: United States Army
- Conflict: Iraq War

Andrew Bailey (born 1981) is an American attorney and politician who served as Co-Deputy Director of the Federal Bureau of Investigation from 2025 to 2026. A member of the Republican Party, he served as Missouri Attorney General from 2023 to 2025.

During his tenure as attorney general, Bailey adopted hardline conservative positions. He refused to release prisoners after overturned convictions, attempted unsuccessfully to restrict gender-affirming care, battled initiatives that restored access to abortion in Missouri, and staunchly defended Donald Trump over his legal problems. Bailey was announced as co-deputy director of the Federal Bureau of Investigation on August 18, 2025 and was sworn on September 15.

In September 2026, Bailey announced that he would resign as the co-deputy director of the Federal Bureau of Investigation.

== Early life and education ==
Bailey grew up in Columbia, Missouri, and Gluckstadt, Mississippi. He earned a Bachelor of Arts degree in English from the University of Missouri while on an Army ROTC scholarship. After graduating from the University of Missouri, he was deployed to Iraq during the Iraq War. Bailey earned a Juris Doctor from the University of Missouri School of Law.

Bailey was serving as general counsel of the Missouri Department of Corrections before joining the office of Governor Mike Parson as deputy general counsel. In 2021, he was appointed as Parson's general counsel.

== Attorney General of Missouri (2023–2025) ==
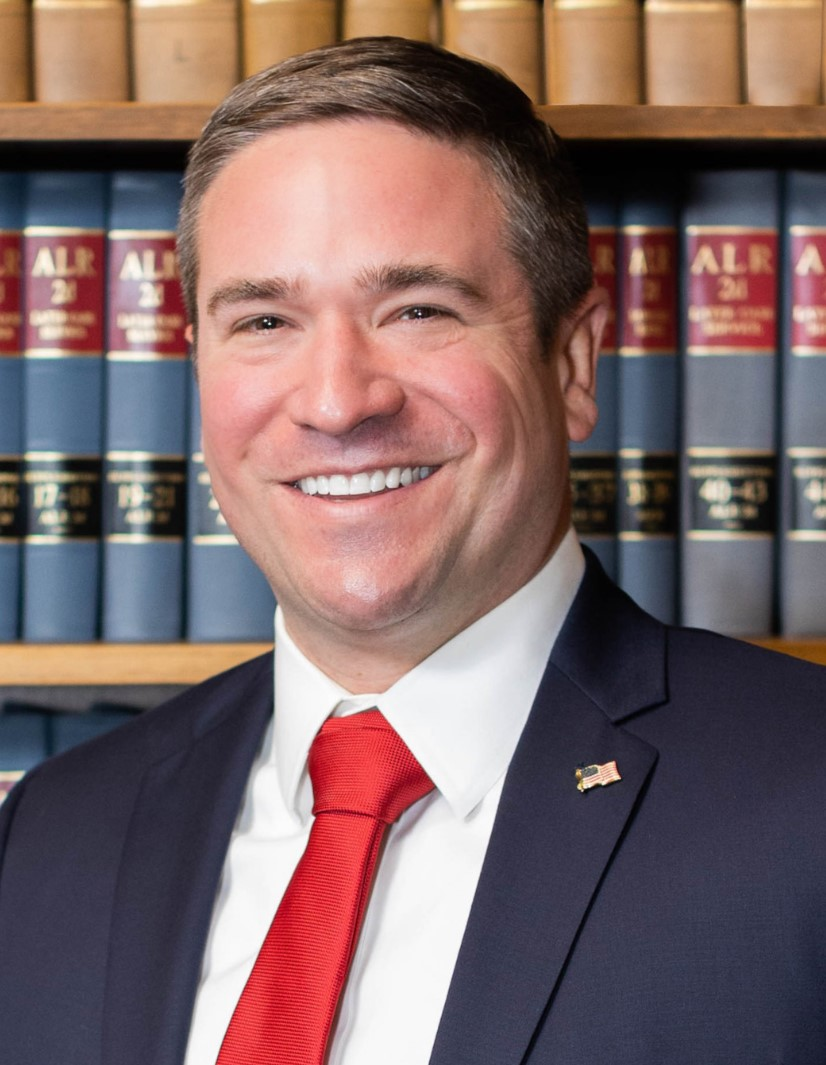
Bailey as attorney general

In November 2022, Parson appointed Bailey as the 44th attorney general of Missouri, after his predecessor Eric Schmitt's election to the U.S. Senate. He took office on January 3, 2023. As attorney general, Bailey moved aggressively to expand his powers and used his post to pursue conservative "culture war" issues.

Throughout his term, Bailey faced a number of controversies regarding his use of power. The St. Louis Post-Dispatch maintains The Bailey Tally, "[a] running count of the many instances in which Missouri's official lawyer has abused the legal process, refused to do his job and/or engaged in blatant conflicts of interest, all in service to a right-wing agenda."

Bailey's office saw high turnover, with 1/3 of budgeted positions vacant in 2024. Staffing inconsistencies led to extreme delays for open cases and were criticized by fellow Republicans in Missouri Legislature, and were compared to Bailey's own criticisms of former St. Louis prosecutor Kim Gardner.

=== Opposition to overturning convictions and judicial response ===
Bailey faced criticism over refusing to overturn miscarriage of justice cases, even when local prosecutors present evidence suggesting that a convicted person is in fact innocent. In the case of Sandra Hemme, who served 43 years of a life sentence prior to her sentence being overturned in June 2024, Bailey's office attempted to circumvent the order to release Hemme. On July 19, Judge Ryan Horsman threatened to hold Bailey in contempt if Hemme was not immediately released from a prison in Chillicothe following rulings by Horsman, an appellate court, and the Missouri Supreme Court. Bailey's office was scolded for telling prison officials not to release Hemme despite the ruling. "To call someone and tell them to disregard a court order is wrong," Judge Horsman said.

In July 2024, Bailey's office announced intentions to appeal and block Judge Jason Sengheiser's ruling of innocence in the case of Christopher Dunn, who served 33 years in state prison.

Bailey also blocked a request for a new evidence hearing in the case of Marcellus "Khaliifah" Williams, despite a DNA "mismatch" identified in 2015. After the trial, prosecutors admitted to excluding a potential African-American juror that Williams' attorneys alleged was due to the juror's race (prosecutors asserted it was due to the juror's close age and physical resemblance to Williams) and acknowledged evidence of crime scene contamination by the state's attorney during the trial. As a result, prosecutors reached a plea agreement with Williams to reduce his death sentence to life without parole. However, Missouri Attorney General Bailey petitioned the Missouri Supreme Court to block the agreement, and subsequently, the plea agreement was overturned. Williams was executed on September 24, 2024, despite efforts by his attorneys and the Missouri prosecutor's office to halt the execution.

Missouri law only allows people on death row to bring innocence claims before a judge. Bailey's office has opposed bipartisan bills in Missouri Legislature to expand opportunities for incarcerated people to advocate for their innocence. Advocates have observed that the office "prioritizes finality over fairness."

=== Abortion ===
Abortion in Missouri is legal up to the point of fetal viability as a result of 2024 Missouri Amendment 3 taking effect on December 6, 2024, 30 days after the November 5, 2024, general election.

Bailey opposes abortion. In 2023, Bailey asked the state auditor's office to change the "anticipated costs" section of a proposed ballot initiative to restore abortion rights in Missouri, which is one of several initiative petitions filed following a ban passed by the state legislature. After Auditor Scott Fitzpatrick (a Republican) classified the initiative as having an estimated impact of "no costs or savings," Bailey sought to change the estimate to "in the billions" and later claimed that restoring abortion rights would cost "upward of $12 billion." Fitzpatrick said that while he personally opposes abortion, there is no evidence that it would cost the state money. The Supreme Court of Missouri unanimously ruled that Bailey had no authority to change the projected cost; in a July 2023 ruling, the Court wrote that Bailey improperly attempted to hold up the initiative, that his authority was to review the "legal content and form" (not the "substance") of the auditor's reports, and that Bailey had refused "to perform the plain, unequivocal and ministerial duty of approving those summaries."

In 2024, Bailey sued Planned Parenthood, accusing it of trafficking minors across state lines for abortions using a Project Veritas video as evidence. Planned Parenthood describes the video as "heavily doctored and edited"; it was found to feature a fictional girl while purporting to be factual. In 2025, Bailey's office subpoenaed Missouri Abortion Fund in the case, despite the organization having no involvement. Elad Gross, representing the group, said the move was an "abuse of government power" and an attempt to overwhelm an organization with minimal resources.

In 2024, Bailey unsuccessfully joined Kansas and Idaho attorneys general in a lawsuit seeking to reinstate FDA restrictions from year 2000 on the medication mifepristone, which induces chemical abortions. The lawsuit was previously filed by anti-abortion medical professionals and rejected by the Supreme Court for lack of Article III standing. Bailey argued that Missouri is harmed by lost projected revenue due to lower teenage pregnancy rates.

=== Defamation ===
Bailey agreed to have his office represent senators Rick Brattin, Denny Hoskins and Nick Schroer in a defamation lawsuit related to the 2024 Kansas City parade shooting, when the senators posted misinformation on social media identifying a bystander as both the shooter and an undocumented immigrant. Bailey claims that the senators are protected by legislative immunity and that their social media posts, later deleted, were made in their official capacity.

=== Disability ===
In 2025, Bailey joined 16 other state attorneys general in a lawsuit aimed to repeal provisions in Section 504 of the Rehabilitation Act. Statements from the attorneys general name recently added provisions related to gender dysphoria and an integration mandate, which operationalized Olmstead v. L.C. Disability advocates raised concern on the case statement of "unconstitutionality" of Section 504 and a lack of communication from Bailey. When questioned on the matter by a member of the House Budget Committee, Bailey could not remember the case.

=== Diversity, equity, and inclusion public schools investigation; ethics complaint ===
In March 2024, an after-school fight at Hazelwood East High School resulted in a 16-year-old student being critically injured by another girl. Bailey's office announced an investigation into the school's focus on diversity, equity and inclusion (DEI) program, although race was not apparently a factor in the fight. Bailey's letter was strongly criticized for containing several easily verified factual errors, for instance, listing the wrong date and time of the fight and suggesting school resource officers could have prevented the incident. The altercation took place off-campus and after the school day. The school district responded that Bailey was politicizing the incident for political purposes. After Bailey announced the investigation, an attorney for the district reported bomb scares in the district and racially-charged hateful messages from across the country.

In April 2024, the district filed a claim charging Bailey violated state rules by initiating a "frivolous" investigation based on inaccurate claims and politicizing the case. "The complaint to Missouri's Office of Chief Legal Counsel cited multiple violations of the Missouri court system's Rules of Professional Conduct, which are based on American Bar Association models... Those rules prohibit lawyers from bringing frivolous claims, making claims in bad faith, making derogatory public comments about targets of legal action, and using the legal process for the purpose of harassment and intimidation."

=== Firearms ===
On March 7, 2023, federal judge Brian C. Wimes found a state law, signed by Parson, regulating cooperation with federal authorities on firearms issues, to be unconstitutional as a violation of the Supremacy Clause. Bailey appealed the case to the Eighth Circuit, who affirmed the court's ruling in August 2024. Bailey pressured Auditor Scott Fitzpatrick to change his fiscal note on a ballot petition for firearm regulations. Bailey's proposed costs of $704 million includes costs associated to an estimated "additional 32 murders and 726 rapes" should stricter regulations be implemented. Fitzpatrick retained his original estimate, which Bailey approved.

=== Gambling ===
Lawyers under Bailey's attorney general's office withdrew from a lawsuit related to unregulated slot machines. The plaintiffs, Torch Electronics and Warrenton Oil, contributed to Bailey's 2024 Missouri Attorney General election campaign. In 2021, former attorney general Eric Schmitt returned contributions from Torch Electronics when conflict of interest concerns were raised, choosing to continue work on the case.

Bailey's office did not respond to questions as to why Bailey's office chose to accept the money rather than withdraw from the case. In a 2024 town hall amongst attorney general candidates a question was asked, "What are we going to do about gambling machines?" The response from Bailey was, "This issue is a failure of the status quo in Jefferson City... Prosecute crimes and enforce the rule of law."

The games have come under scrutiny by the Missouri Gaming Association, Missouri State Highway Patrol, and St. Louis County Board of Police Commissioners, who have found a lack of clear legal guidance on the issue. Will Scharf, rival candidate for attorney general, describes the games as "blatantly illegal" and within the scope of the office's responsibilities.

=== Media Matters for America ===
In 2023, Bailey opened a fraud investigation into the left-leaning Media Matters for America, alleging fraud in the organization's reports on placement of advertisements next to pro-Nazi content on Twitter.

=== Social media censorship ===
In June 2024 the U.S. Supreme Court, in a 6–3 decision, rejected arguments that the federal government violated the First Amendment in its efforts to combat misleading information online. The court held that the co-plaintiffs in the case, including the states of Missouri and Louisiana and seven individuals, could not demonstrate any harm or risk that they will suffer an injury in the future—that they did not have standing to file a suit. A lower court ruled officials in the Trump and Biden administrations unlawfully coerced social media companies to remove "deceptive or inaccurate content out of fears it would fuel vaccine hesitancy or upend elections."

=== Starbucks ===
In February 2025, Bailey filed a lawsuit against Starbucks alleging employment discrimination against white workers and male workers. The company responded that it does not discriminate. When Bailey requested additional funds from the Missouri House Budget Committee, members pointed to unspent funds from the previous budget and suggested evaluation of Bailey's staffing issues.

=== Student debt relief ===
Bailey supports the lawsuit filed by former AG Eric Schmitt against the Biden student debt relief plan on behalf of the Higher Education Loan Authority of the State of Missouri (MOHELA), a company contracted to handle student loan accounts. A federal judge in Missouri initially threw out the suit, saying that the company was too far removed from the state of Missouri for the case to have standing; however, federal appeals sent the case to the Supreme Court and froze student debt relief indefinitely.

When asked about MOHELA's unpaid contributions to state higher aid funds since 2008, Bailey responded the issue is for the Supreme Court "to sort out." Advocates for student debt relief have argued that MOHELA's revenues would increase should the plan go through.

=== Transgender care bans ===
In April 2023, Bailey released an emergency rule requiring health care providers to screen individuals before providing gender-affirming health care to transgender people. The rule was believed to be the first such ban in the nation as it would apply to adults, in addition to children. The rule would have taken effect April 27, 2023, and expired in February 2024. Bailey justified the rule claiming that the medical procedures were "experimental" and required "substantial guardrails." This political intervention in medical care aligned with bills filed in other states; however, Bailey escalated the process through his office's authority in Missouri Merchandising Practices Act.

The rule required healthcare providers to document gender dysphoria for a period of three years before prescribing puberty blockers, cross-sex hormones, or gender-affirming surgery. Transgender individuals would be required to undergo 15 sessions with a psychologist or psychiatrist over at least 18 months before receiving care. The rule required providers to ensure "mental health comorbidities" have been "treated and resolved." The rule required providers to document that the patient has been screened for autism and social contagion and, for minors, social media addiction.

The rule was suspended while the American Civil Liberties Union, Lambda Legal, service providers, and community members challenged the rule in court. Bailey withdrew the rule in May 2023, following passage of a bill in the Missouri legislature restricting care for transgender youth. Bailey announced his intention to take legal action against the Kansas City Police Department should they fail to enforce restrictions. But the Police Chief clarified that the matter was outside their jurisdiction since the bill's provisions do not relate to criminal conduct.

In 2023, Bailey made 54 demands to the Children's Mercy Hospital in Kansas City for documents and testimony related to trans care, although the hospital was not accused of any wrongdoing. In April 2023, Children's Mercy sued Bailey in state court, arguing that the demands exceeded Bailey's investigative authority and that release of the information demanded by Bailey would violate medical privacy laws, among other state and federal statutes. In July 2024, a St. Louis Circuit Court judge ruled that Bailey could not receive unredacted private medical information of minors treated at the Washington University Transgender Clinic.

=== Pro-Trump positions ===
In March 2023, Bailey condemned a grand jury in New York after it indicted Donald Trump on charges of falsifying business records, arising from his company's payment of hush money to a pornographic film star. Bailey, along with other Missouri Republicans, blamed George Soros for the grand jury decision; Jewish leaders in Missouri criticized these statements for echoing antisemitic tropes.

As attorney general, Bailey has appeared on shows hosted by Jenna Ellis, a former lawyer to Donald Trump, who has been indicted on felony charges for conspiring to overturn the 2020 presidential election. The Kansas City Star criticized Bailey's decision to appear on the podcast, writing that it was "remarkable" that "Missouri's chief legal officer, a role that at times involves prosecuting criminal cases, is appearing with an individual accused of committing a felony to advance a conspiracy to overturn a presidential election in another state."

In December 2023, Bailey, representing Missouri, joined an amicus brief, submitted by Republican state attorneys general in support of the ex-president in the United States v. Trump case against Trump over his handling of classified documents. The brief, led by Alabama, argued against the application of the Presidential Records Act to certain documents in the case.

In June 2024, Bailey announced his intention to file a lawsuit against the State of New York in the U.S. Supreme Court, asking the court to "stay the gag order and any sentence" in New York's criminal case against Trump until after the 2024 presidential election. He justified the lawsuit by claiming that the gag and sentencing order would interfere with Missouri citizens' ability to obtain election-related information and with the state's electors' ability to perform their duties. He filed the lawsuit on July 3. In his suit, Bailey attempted to invoke the Supreme Court's exclusive jurisdiction to hear disputes between two states. The Supreme Court rejected Bailey's lawsuit on August 5.

=== 2024 campaign ===
In 2024, Bailey campaigned for a full term as Attorney General. In the Republican primary election, Bailey faced challenger Will Scharf, a former assistant U.S. attorney and official in Eric Greitens' administration. Bailey's campaign was supported by the "Life and Liberty PAC," managed by Steven Tilley, whose biggest donors are Pauline MacMillan Keinath of the Cargill family, and the family and associates of Michael Ketchmark. Scharf's campaign was supported by the "Defend Missouri PAC" (which is funded largely by the Judicial Crisis Network and other groups associated with conservative activist Leonard Leo). Bailey won the Republican primary, and subsequently the general election, as he defeated Democrat Elad Gross.

Shortly after winning reelection, it was revealed that Bailey was on President-elect Donald Trump's shortlist of candidates for U.S. Attorney General; however, Trump ultimately chose Pam Bondi for the role.

== Deputy Director of the FBI (2025–2026) ==
On August 18, 2025, Attorney General Pam Bondi announced Bailey as Co-Deputy Director of the Federal Bureau of Investigation (FBI). Bailey resigned as Missouri Attorney General on September 8, 2025. Bailey was sworn in as Co-Deputy Director of the Federal Bureau of Investigation on September 15, 2025, serving along with Dan Bongino until the latter's resignation on January 3, 2026, thus making Bailey sole deputy director, until Christopher Raia’s appointment on January 12, in which he resumed status as co-deputy director.

Bailey resigned as Co-Deputy Director effective October 2, 2026.

== Personal life ==
Bailey and his wife, Jessica, have four children, three of whom they fostered and later adopted. They live in Montgomery County, Missouri.

Party political offices
Preceded by Eric Schmitt	Republican nominee for Attorney General of Missouri; 2024	Most recent
Legal offices
Preceded by Eric Schmitt	Attorney General of Missouri; 2023–2025	Succeeded by Catherine Hanaway
Government offices
Preceded by Dan Bongino as sole Deputy Director	Deputy Director of the Federal Bureau of Investigation; 2025–present Served alongside: Dan Bongino, Christopher Raia	Incumbent
