= Torch Electronics =

Midwestern gambling company

- Industry: Gaming, Electronics
- Founded: Missouri, United States
- Founder: Steven Miltenberger
- Headquarters: Wildwood Missouri, United States
- Products: Gaming machines
- Website: https://torchelectronics.com/

Torch Electronics is an electronic gaming machine company based in Missouri. The company has been the subject of various lawsuits and regulatory actions, mainly centered around the legality of its gaming devices.

== History ==
Torch Electronics was founded in Missouri by Steven Miltenberger. The company's primary business revolves around producing "no chance" gaming machines, which bear a striking resemblance to slot machines. These machines are typically installed in gas stations, convenience stores, and other small venues. Unlike traditional slot machines found in casinos, Torch Electronics markets its devices as skill-based games that do not rely solely on chance, attempting to circumvent the stricter gambling regulations that govern chance-based gaming.

== Legal battles ==
In 2022, Missouri lawmakers renewed their push for stricter regulations to curb the spread of Torch's machines, threatening the loss of liquor licenses for stores hosting Torch's machines. Local casino operators have also expressed concern over Torch's operations, claiming that the company is benefiting from unregulated gambling without paying the taxes and fees typically required of legitimate gaming operators.

== Public Perception ==
Torch Electronics has drawn criticism from consumer protection advocates, local officials, and gambling industry experts. Opponents argue that the company's machines target vulnerable populations, including individuals with gambling addictions, while operating in an unregulated environment that lacks the safeguards present in licensed casinos. They also argue that the machines siphon revenue away from state-sponsored lotteries and licensed gaming operations, which are typically subject to stricter oversight and taxation.

Supporters of Torch Electronics, on the other hand, claim that the machines offer a form of entertainment and economic opportunity for small businesses with wide adoption seen across Missouri particularly in convenience stores and gas stations. The company itself maintains that it operates within the bounds of state law with its attorney Chuck Hatfield stating that Torch supported ordinances targeting illegal gambling parlors and that its machines are legitimate businesses.

=== Relationships with public offices ===
Torch Electronics has reportedly been involved in lobbying efforts to protect its business model and prevent the passage of stricter regulations that would affect its operations. The company has worked with many people well connected in Missouri politics, including political consultant Gregg Keller as spokesman, Steven Tilley as lobbyist, and Todd Graves and Bob Blitz as legal representation.

In 2021, then Missouri Attorney General Eric Schmitt returned donations from founder Steven Miltenberger and his wife Sondra Miltenberger.

Lawyers under appointed AG Andrew Bailey's attorney general's office withdrew from a lawsuit related to Torch's slot machines with Torch contributing to Bailey's 2024 Missouri Attorney General election campaign. Bailey's office did not respond to questions as to why Bailey's office chose to accept the money rather than withdraw from the case.

In 2023, concerns were raised that Torch Electronics may employ off-duty police officers to collect money from devices. The company declined to comment. Torch has been a top sponsor for the law enforcement fundraiser Guns 'n Hoses for multiple years.

In 2024, state treasurer Vivek Malek was criticized for a partnership with Torch Electronics to place decals on gaming machines. Malek said the arrangement was an outcome of a private meeting arranged by Steven Tilley. He later agreed to remove the decals.
