= Edina Realty =

Largest real estate company in Minnesota

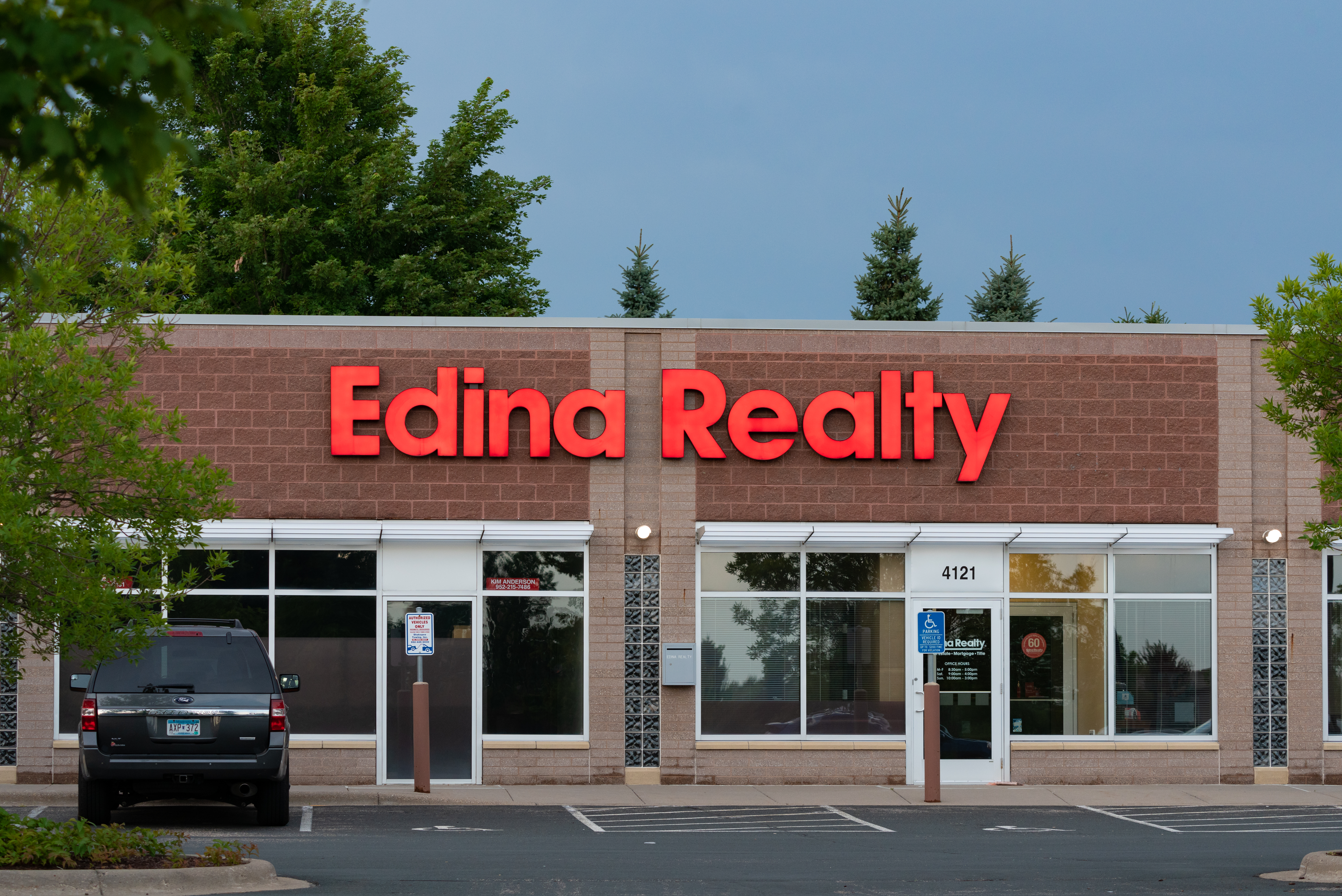
- Edina Realty office, Shakopee, Minnesota
- Founded: 1955
- Founder: Emma Rovick
- Headquarters: Edina, Minnesota, U.S.
- Website: edinarealty.com

Edina Realty Home Services, based in Edina, Minnesota, is a Berkshire Hathaway affiliate and a wholly owned subsidiary of HomeServices of America, Inc. Edina Realty is the largest real estate company in Minnesota by sales volume and transaction sides. In 2024, the company conducted nearly 18,000 real estate transactions and $7.4 billion in sales volume.

Edina Realty has nearly 60 real estate offices and 2,000+ realtors operating in Minnesota, western Wisconsin and southwest Florida. Edina Realty Home Services includes Edina Realty, Edina Realty Title, Prosperity Home Mortgage and Edina Realty Insurance.

== History ==
Edina Realty was established in 1955 by Emma Rovick. The company's first real estate office was located at 50th and France Avenue in Edina, Minnesota.

The firm has acquired several real estate firms. During 2007 and 2008, Edina Realty acquired 17 real estate firms throughout the Midwest. In 2022, Edina Realty expanded into South Dakota with the acquisition of Hegg Realtors headquartered in Sioux Falls. In 2024, Edina Realty opened its first Florida office location and later that year announced a merger with BHHS North Properties, further expanding its presence in western Wisconsin.
