= Vivek Malek =

American politician (born 1977)

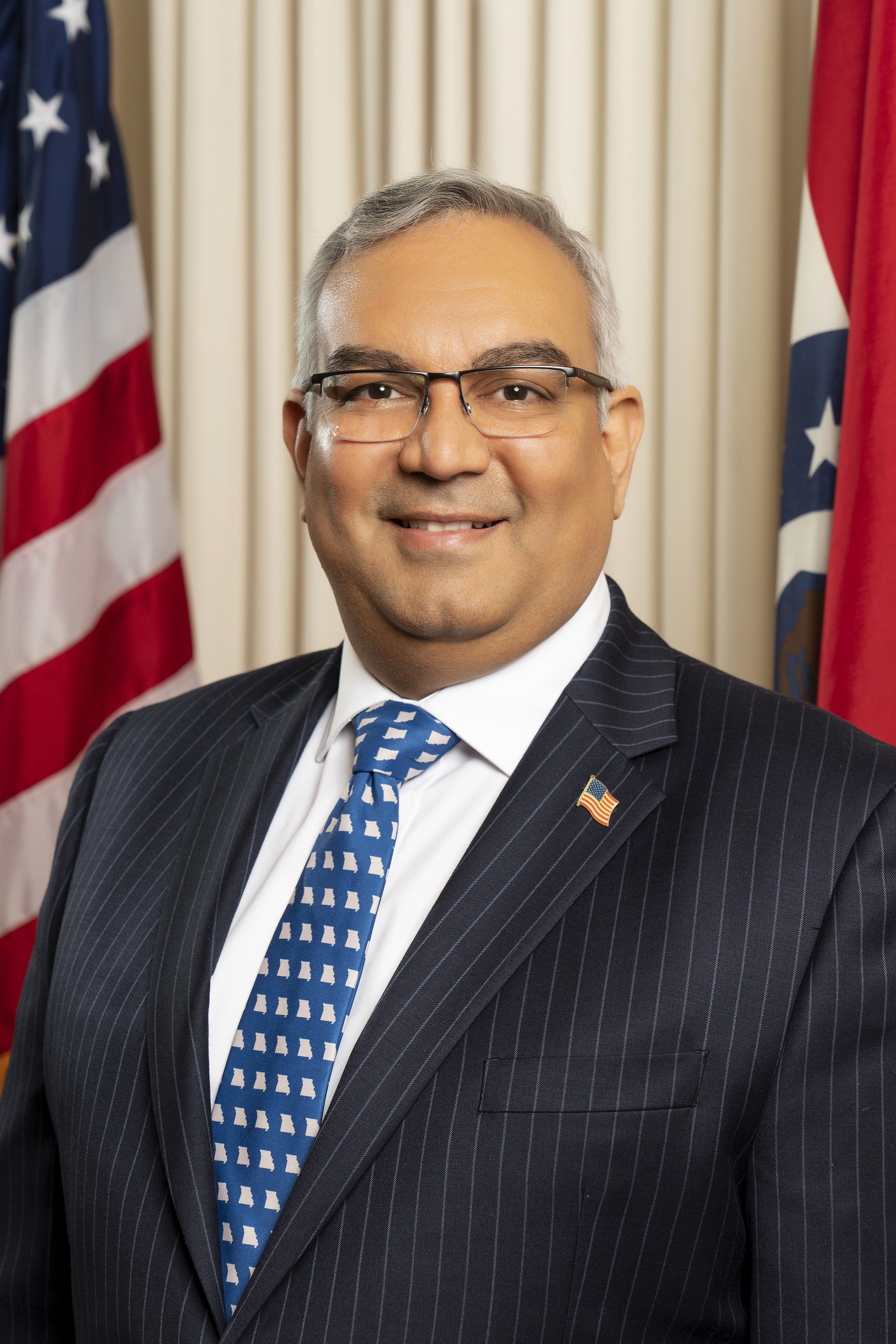

48th Treasurer of Missouri
- Incumbent
- Assumed office January 17, 2023
- Governor: Mike Parson; Mike Kehoe
- Preceded by: Scott Fitzpatrick

Personal details
- Born: 1977 (age 48–49) Rohtak, India
- Party: Republican
- Spouse: Riju
- Children: 3
- Education: Maharshi Dayanand University (BA, LLB); Southeast Missouri State University (MBA); University of Illinois, Urbana-Champaign (LLM)

Vivek Malek (born 1977) is an American attorney, businessman, and politician serving as the state treasurer of Missouri since 2023. First appointed by Governor Mike Parson in 2022, he was elected to a full term in 2024. He is a member of the Republican Party and the first person of color to win state office in Missouri history.

== Early life and education ==
Malek was born and raised in India. He graduated from Maharshi Dayanand University with a Bachelor of Arts degree and a Bachelor of Law, and went on to receive a Master of Business Administration from Southeast Missouri State University and a Master of Laws from the University of Illinois College of Law.

== Career ==
Malek began practicing law in Missouri in 2006. In 2011, he established his law firm, Law Offices of Vivek Malek, with a focus on immigration law. The Missouri House of Representatives and Senate recognized "his service and contributions to Missouri communities" in 2007 and 2015, respectively, and the St. Louis Business Journal awarded him their Minority Business Leader Award in 2010. He also appeared on Business Today's list of "30 under 30." In 2020, Governor Mike Parson appointed him to the board of governors of his alma mater, Southeast Missouri State University.

Prior to his appointment as treasurer, Malek worked in real estate with Nathan Cooper, whose law firm he'd previously worked for. Cooper became notorious in St. Louis for unmaintained rental properties. Malek describes his involvement as both a family enterprise and passive investment, saying he was not aware of unaddressed tenant complaints.

=== State Treasurer of Missouri ===
On December 20, 2022, Parson appointed Malek Treasurer of Missouri, following Scott Fitzpatrick's election as State Auditor. He became the first person of color to hold statewide office in Missouri. He successfully sought reelection to a full term in 2024.

=== China divestment ===
In 2023, Malek proposed divesting state pension funds from investments in China, citing citing COVID-19, the 2023 Chinese balloon incident, Chinese suppliers of Fentanyl, and foreign relations. The proposal was rejected by the MOSER board, but passed in a special meeting requested by Mike Parson. Opponents criticized the proposal as politically motivated related to Malek's campaign, and the request by Parson as interference.

In April 14 2025, Malek requested a China-free exchange-traded fund (ETF) for the state college savings plan from The Vanguard Group. On May 30, Vanguard filed with the U.S. Securities and Exchange Commission to launch the Vanguard Emerging Markets Ex-China ETF. Malek has also supported promoting the fund to Missouri’s smaller public pension systems.

=== Unclaimed property ===
Malek increased efforts to return unclaimed property, returning more than previous treasurers. In 2023, the Treasurer’s office held approximately $1.39 billion in unclaimed property. That year, Malek facilitated the return of $51,817,543.80 in unclaimed property, surpassing the previous record set in the prior fiscal year.

He drew bipartisan criticism from making a deal to advertise the unclaimed property program on Torch Electronics gaming machines, a company in an ongoing legal battle with the state. Legislators questioned the arrangement, as well as the meeting between Malek and company owner arranged by lobbyist Steven Tilley. Malek removed the advertisements following a committee hearing on the issue.

=== MOBUCK$ ===
Malek has advocated to expand the capacity of the MOBUCK$ low interest loan program, which closed 2023 applications early due to high demand. When the program opened with $119 million in available funds on January 2, all funds were allocated within six hours, reflecting the high interest from applicants facing rising interest rates. Malek has championed the program's expansion, and House Bill 1803 was passed in 2024 to increase MOBUCK$ funding from $800 million to $1.2 billion.

=== DEI ===
Malek has argued that DEI programs prioritize equality of outcomes over equality of opportunity, and that inclusion and equity statements in job posts favor political activism over academic and teaching.

=== Immigration ===
Malek described Biden administration’s immigration policies as a "disastrous open-border policy." Malek says that illegal immigration increases costs to the state related to the fentanyl crisis and criminal activity. He considered Biden's removal of Title 42 limits an insult to legal immigrants.

=== 2024 Campaign ===
Malek successfully sought reelection to a full term in 2024, and won the Republican nomination against several challengers in August.

== Personal life ==
Malek resides in Wildwood, Missouri, with his wife, Riju, and their three children.

== Electoral history ==
=== State treasurer ===
Missouri Treasurer primary election, August 6, 2024
Party	Candidate	Votes	%	±%
Republican	Vivek Malek (incumbent)	273,930	41.5	
Republican	Andrew Koenig	135,828	20.6	
Republican	Lori Rook	127,970	19.4	
Republican	Cody Smith	97,029	14.7	
Republican	Tina Goodrick	19,115	2.9	

Missouri Treasurer general election, November 5, 2024
Party	Candidate	Votes	%	±%
Republican	Vivek Malek (incumbent)	1,684,714	57.931	−1.17
Democratic	Mark Osmack	1,106,236	38.039	−0.06
Libertarian	John A. Hartwig, Jr.	81,443	2.801	0.60
Green	Reagan Haase	35,745	0.63	
Total votes		2,908,138	100.00%	
Republican hold				

Party political offices
Preceded by Scott Fitzpatrick	Republican nominee for State Treasurer of Missouri; 2024	Most recent
Political offices
Preceded by Scott Fitzpatrick	Treasurer of Missouri; 2023–present	Incumbent
