= Shane Schoeller =

American politician

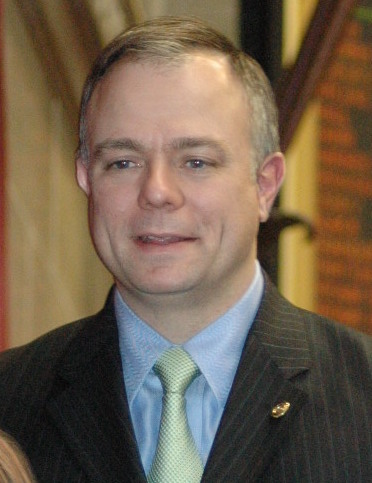

County Clerk of Greene County, Missouri
- Incumbent
- Assumed office 2014

Speaker of the Missouri House of Representatives
- Acting
- In office August 13, 2012 – September 12, 2012
- Preceded by: Steven Tilley
- Succeeded by: Tim Jones

Member of the Missouri House of Representatives from the 139th district
- In office January 2007 – January 2013
- Preceded by: Brad Roark
- Succeeded by: Kevin Elmer

Personal details
- Born: August 21, 1971 (age 54) Salina, Kansas, U.S.
- Party: Republican
- Spouse: Mendie Schoeller
- Children: 3
- Education: Southwest Baptist University (BS)
- Website: Campaign website

Shane Schoeller (born August 21, 1971) is an American politician, currently serving as the Greene County Clerk. He is a former Republican member of the Missouri House of Representatives. Schoeller represented the 139th district, encompassing North Springfield and the communities of Walnut Grove, Fair Grove, and Willard in the northern half of Greene County. Schoeller also served as the Speaker Pro Tem of the House for the 96th General Assembly. On August 13, 2012, Speaker of the Missouri House of Representatives Steven Tilley resigned. As Speaker Pro Tem, Schoeller held the office for one month until a replacement was named.

Shane was the Republican nominee for Missouri Secretary of State in the 2012 election, losing in the general election to Democrat Jason Kander. Following his narrow loss for Secretary of State, Schoeller was named the executive director of the Missouri Republican Party.

== Early life and education ==
Schoeller was born in Salina, Kansas, and later moved to Branson, Missouri, where he graduated from Branson High School. He received a Bachelor of Science degree from Southwest Baptist University. He is married to Mendie Schoeller, and they have three children: Emma Marie, Dorthy Katelynn, and Johnny Frederick.

== Professional career ==
Schoeller's professional background encompasses working on behalf of the Home Builder Association of Greater Springfield as the Director of Government Affairs. He also has served as Director of Development for Students in Free Enterprise, a global, non-profit organization based on more than 1700 campuses across the world that teaches students the principles of free enterprise.

Schoeller also worked in politics and government as a Field Representative for U.S. Senators John Ashcroft and Kit Bond, as a Legislative Assistant for U.S. Congressman Roy Blunt, and as Chief Administrative Aide to Matt Blunt during his tenure as Missouri Secretary of State.

== Political career ==
Schoeller was elected in 2006 to succeed Brad Roark. In the primary, Schoeller defeated his nearest opponent, Karen Roark (mother to outgoing Representative Roark) with 47.7% of the vote as opposed to Roark's 37.5%. Schoeller then defeated Democrat Jamie Schoolcraft and Libertarian Thomas Martz in the November general election to become state representative. Schoeller won reelection in 2008, facing no primary opposition and defeating Democrat Janet Adams with nearly 70 percent of the vote. Schoeller ran unopposed in the 2010 Republican primary and general election.

In 2014, Schoeller was elected to the office of Greene County Clerk. He was reelected in 2018 and for a third term in 2022.

=== Electoral history ===
2008 General Election for Missouri's 139th District House of Representatives
Party	Candidate	Votes	%	±%
Republican	Shane Schoeller	13,611	69.2	
Democratic	Janet Adams	6,057	30.8	

2006 General Election for Missouri's 139th District House of Representatives
Party	Candidate	Votes	%	±%
Republican	Shane Schoeller	8,370	54.1	
Democratic	Jamie Daniel Schoolcraft	6,693	43.3	
Libertarian	Thomas Martz	398	2.6	

2006 Primary Election for Missouri's 139th District House of Representatives
Party	Candidate	Votes	%	±%
Republican	Shane Schoeller	1,479	47.7	
Republican	Karen Roark	1,162	37.5	
Republican	Joe Pyles	460	14.8	

=== Candidacy for Missouri Secretary of State ===
On October 24, 2011, Representative Schoeller announced his candidacy in the Missouri secretary of state election, 2012. Schoeller has since received 90+ endorsements from colleagues in the Missouri House and Senate. Additionally, Representative Schoeller received endorsements by John Ashcroft, Alan Keyes, and Kansas Secretary of State Kris Kobach. Schoeller led the field in fundraising throughout the race and had a campaign marked by a strong grassroots effort. Despite a barrage of last-minute attack ads from opponents, on August 7, 2012, Schoeller won the Republican Primary with 35.3 percent of the vote over opponents Scott Rupp and Bill Stouffer.

In the General Election, Schoeller faced off against attorney and fellow State Representative Jason Kander. Despite nearly $900,000 in donations from Rex Sinquefield, Kander outraised Schoeller and was able to defeat Schoeller on Election Day by approximately 40,000 votes, 48.9 to 47.4 percent.

=== Executive Director of the Missouri Republican Party ===
Following his narrow defeat for Secretary of State, Schoeller was tapped by new Missouri Republican Party Chairman Ed Martin to serve as executive director of the Party. The announcement was made on February 28, 2013. In the announcement, Martin called Schoeller 'A passionate and articulate messenger for the Republican Party.'

== Personal life ==
Schoeller and his family are members of Second Baptist Church in Springfield. He also serves on the Missouri Tourism Commission, holds a membership in the Willard Chamber of Commerce and is a board member of Clear Vision Drama Company.

Political offices
Preceded by Steven Tilley	Speaker of the Missouri House of Representatives; 2012	Succeeded by Tim Jones
Party political offices
Preceded by Mitch Hubbard	Republican nominee for Secretary of State of Missouri; 2012	Succeeded by Jay Ashcroft
