= Mark Richardson (politician) =

American politician

Member of the Missouri House of Representatives

Mark L. Richardson (born March 19, 1952, in Poplar Bluff, Missouri) was a politician who served as Minority Leader in the Missouri House of Representatives. He also served as an assistant prosecuting attorney and a circuit judge.

His son Todd Richardson has also served as a Republican in the Missouri House of Representatives, and as Speaker of the House from 2015 to 2019.
