= Shawn Rhoads =

American politician

Member of the Missouri House of Representatives from the 154th district
- In office January 9, 2013 – June 18, 2018
- Preceded by: Todd Richardson
- Succeeded by: David Evans

Personal details
- Born: January 18, 1977 (age 49) West Plains, Missouri
- Party: Republican

Shawn Rhoads (born January 18, 1977) is an American politician who served in the Missouri House of Representatives from the 154th district from 2013 to 2018.
