= John Wiemann =

American politician

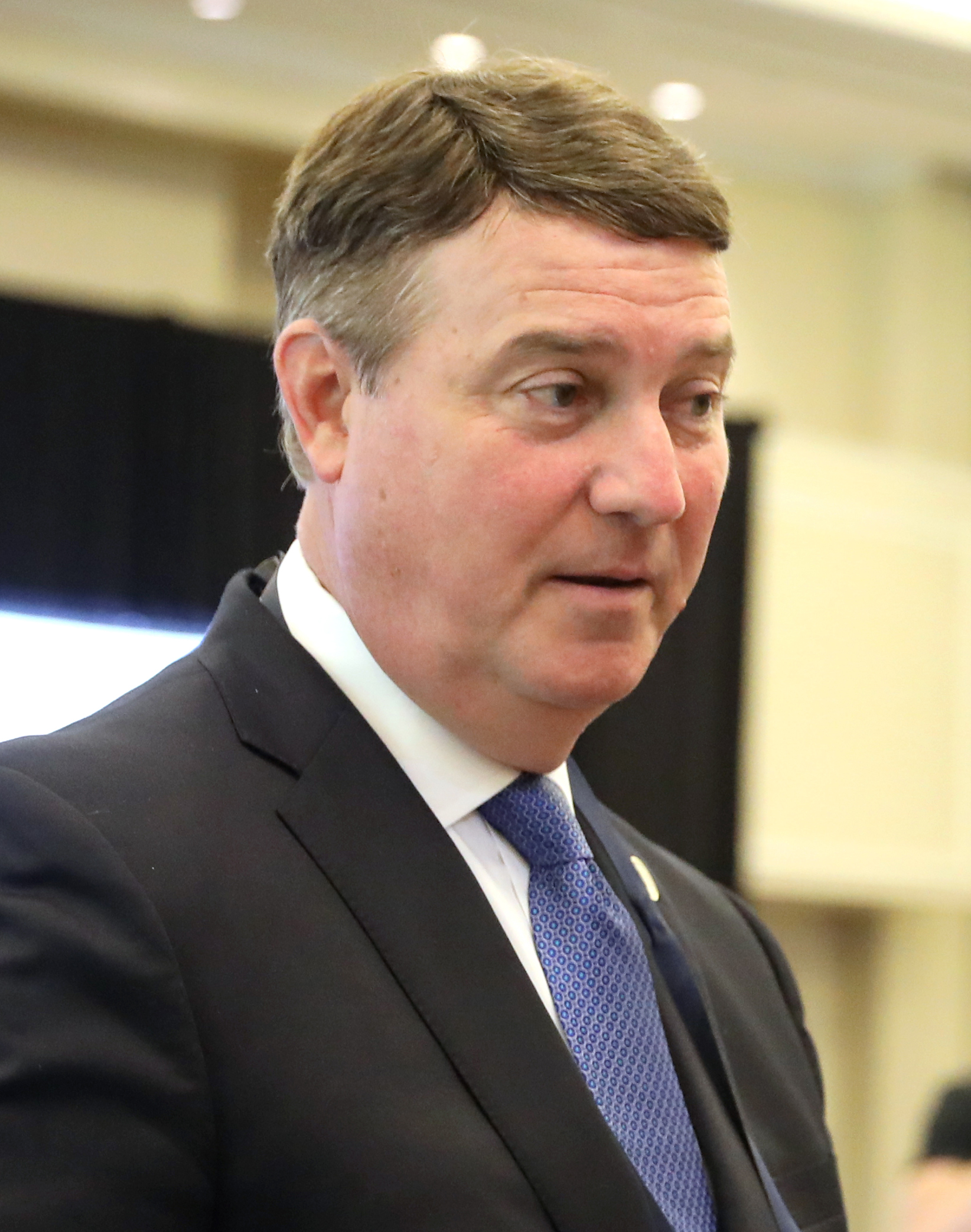

Speaker pro tempore of the Missouri House of Representatives
- In office January 9, 2019 – January 4, 2023
- Preceded by: Elijah Haahr
- Succeeded by: Mike Henderson

Member of the Missouri House of Representatives from the 103rd district
- In office January 2015 – January 4, 2023
- Preceded by: Doug Funderburk
- Succeeded by: Dave Hinman

Personal details
- Born: May 15, 1967 (age 59) St. Louis, Missouri, U.S.
- Party: Republican
- Education: East Central College; University of Missouri, Columbia (BA, MHA)

John D. Wiemann is an American politician who represented District 103 in the Missouri House of Representatives. A member of the Republican Party, he was first elected in November 2014, and re-elected to three more terms to January 2023. Wiemann served as the Speaker pro tempore of the Missouri House of Representatives from 2019 to 2023. He ran for an open 2022 seat in the second district of the state senate, though he lost in the primary.

== Election results ==
=== State senate ===
Missouri Senate Primary Election, August 2, 2022, District 2
Party	Candidate	Votes	%	±%
Republican	Nick Schroer	12,047	57.6%	
Republican	John D. Wiemann	8,868	42.4%	

=== State representative ===
Missouri House of Representatives Election, November 3, 2020, District 103
Party	Candidate	Votes	%	±%
Republican	John D. Wiemann	14,342	63.21%	+2.33
Democratic	Lisa Rees	8,349	36.79%	−2.33

Missouri House of Representatives Election, November 6, 2018, District 103
Party	Candidate	Votes	%	±%
Republican	John D. Wiemann	11,343	60.88%	−6.32
Democratic	Jim Klenc	7,289	39.12%	+10.23

Missouri House of Representatives Election, November 8, 2016, District 103
Party	Candidate	Votes	%	±%
Republican	John D. Wiemann	14,019	67.20%	−11.48
Democratic	Marguerite Dillworth	6,026	28.89%	+28.89
Libertarian	Charles (Matt) Hull	816	3.91%	−18.41

Missouri House of Representatives Election, November 4, 2014, District 103
Party	Candidate	Votes	%	±%
Republican	John D. Wiemann	7,308	78.68%	−21.32
Libertarian	Dean Hodge	1,980	21.32%	+21.32

Missouri House of Representatives Primary Election, August 5, 2014, District 103
Party	Candidate	Votes	%	±%
Republican	John D. Wiemann	2,158	49.14%	
Republican	Alexander McArthy	1,362	31.01%	
Republican	Kyle Schlereth	872	19.85%	

Missouri House of Representatives
Preceded by Elijah Haahr	Speaker pro tempore of the Missouri House of Representatives; 2019–2023	Succeeded by Mike Henderson
