= 2024 Missouri State Treasurer election =

- November 5, 2024
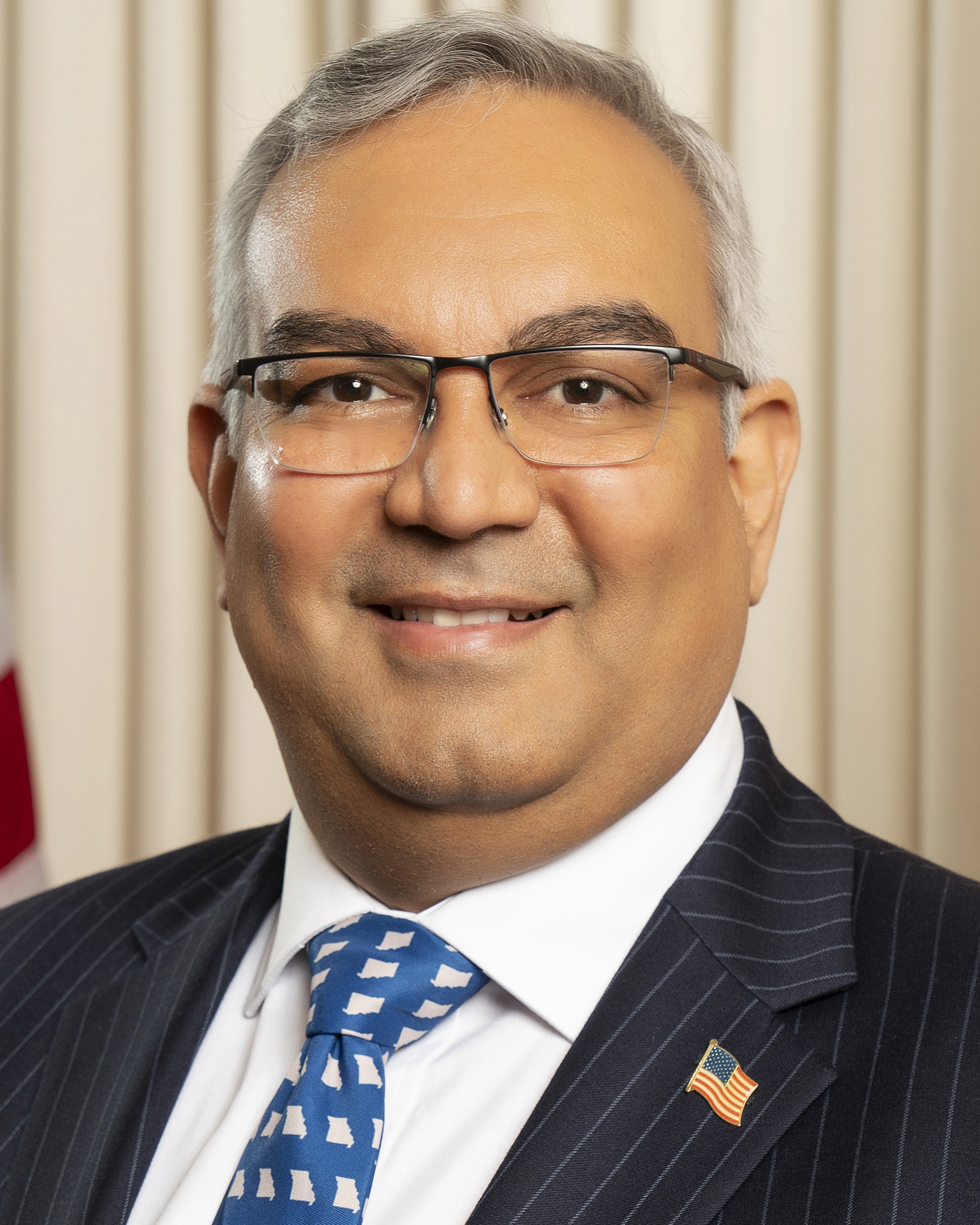

Nominee	Vivek Malek	Mark Osmack
Party	Republican	Democratic
Popular vote	1,684,714	1,106,236
Percentage	57.93%	38.04%
- Malek: 40–50% 50–60% 60–70% 70–80% 80–90% >90% Osmack: 40–50% 50–60% 60–70% 70–80% 80–90% >90% Tie: 40–50% 50% No votes
State Treasurer before election
Vivek Malek
Republican
Elected State Treasurer
Vivek Malek
Republican

The 2024 Missouri State Treasurer election took place on November 5, 2024, to elect the next Missouri state treasurer. Incumbent Republican treasurer Vivek Malek was appointed to the position in 2023 by Governor Mike Parson. He replaced Scott Fitzpatrick, who resigned after being elected state auditor. Malek was elected to a full term.

== Republican primary ==
=== Candidates ===
==== Nominee ====
- Vivek Malek, incumbent state treasurer

==== Eliminated in primary ====
- Andrew Koenig, state senator
- Tina Goodrick
- Karan Pujji, management consultant
- Lori Rook, attorney
- Cody Smith, state representative

==== Declined ====
- Carrie Almond, former president of the National Federation of Republican Women (2016–2017) (endorsed Malek)

==== Endorsements ====
Andrew Koenig

Organizations

- Missouri Right to Life PAC (co-endorsement with Malek and Smith)
Vivek Malek

Statewide officials

- Wendell Bailey, former state treasurer of Missouri (1985–1993)
- Mike Parson, governor of Missouri (2018–2025)

Organizations

- Missouri Right to Life PAC (co-endorsement with Koenig and Smith)
Cody Smith

Organizations

- Missouri Right to Life PAC (co-endorsement with Koenig and Malek)

=== Polling ===
Poll source	Date(s) administered	Sample size (Note: Key: A – all adults RV – registered voters LV – likely voters V – unclear)	Margin of error	Tina Goodrick	Andrew Koenig	Vivek Malek	Karan Pujji	Lori Rook	Cody Smith	Undecided
Battleground Connect (R) (Note: Poll commissioned by the Missouri Scout)	August 3, 2024	?	?	2%	10%	33%	–	12%	13%	27%
Battleground Connect (R)	July 30–31, 2024	896 (LV)	± 3.1%	3%	10%	33%	2%	12%	13%	27%
Remington Research (R)	July 27, 2024	706 (LV)	± 3.6%	–	10%	31%	–	9%	9%	36%
Remington Research Group (R)	July 22–24, 2024	864 (LV)	± 3.3%	2%	10%	31%	3%	9%	9%	36%
co/efficient (R)	July 21–22, 2024	981 (LV)	± 3.92%	1%	7%	28%	1%	8%	2%	52%
Remington Research (R)	June 11–13, 2024	578 (LV)	± 4.0%	–	8%	7%	2%	8%	12%	58%
Remington Research (R)	February 14–15, 2024	706 (LV)	± 3.6%	–	9%	8%	–	16%	8%	58%
Remington Research (R)	September 27–28, 2023	714 (LV)	± 3.4%	–	17%	8%	–	6%	9%	60%
Remington Research (R)	July 5–7, 2023	706 (LV)	± 3.4%	–	13%	6%	–	–	13%	68%
Remington Research (R)	April 11–12, 2023	778 (LV)	± 3.4%	–	–	10%	–	–	21%	69%
Remington Research (R)	February 8–9, 2023	820 (LV)	± 3.2%	–	–	6%	–	–	11%	83%

=== Fundraising ===
Campaign finance reports as of July 12, 2024
Candidate	Raised
Vivek Malek (R)	$1,600,000
Cody Smith (R)	$723,000
Lori Rook (R)	$500,000
Andrew Koenig (R)	$196,000
Source: Missouri Independent

=== Results ===
Republican primary results
Party	Candidate	Votes	%
Republican	Vivek Malek (incumbent)	273,930	41.51%
Republican	Andrew Koenig	135,828	20.58%
Republican	Lori Rook	127,970	19.39%
Republican	Cody Smith	97,029	14.70%
Republican	Tina Goodrick	19,115	2.90%
Republican	Karan Pujji	6,124	0.93%
Total votes		659,996	100.00%

== Democratic primary ==
=== Candidates ===
==== Nominee ====
- Mark Osmack, lobbyist and candidate for Missouri's 2nd congressional district in 2018

=== Results ===
Democratic primary results
Party	Candidate	Votes	%
Democratic	Mark Osmack	344,166	100.00%
Total votes		344,166	100.00%

== Libertarian primary ==
=== Candidates ===
==== Nominee ====
- John Hartwig, accountant and nominee for state auditor in 2022

=== Results ===
Libertarian primary results
Party	Candidate	Votes	%
Libertarian	John Hartwig	2,423	100.00%
Total votes		2,423	100.00%

== General election ==
=== Polling ===
Poll source	Date(s) administered	Sample size	Margin of error	Vivek Malek (R)	Mark Osmack (D)	Other	Undecided
ActiVote	October 8–27, 2024	400 (LV)	± 4.9%	56%	44%	–	–
ActiVote	September 6 – October 13, 2024	400 (LV)	± 4.9%	57%	43%	–	–
Remington Research Group	October 2–3, 2024	753 (LV)	± 3.2%	50%	40%	2% (Note: Hartwig Jr (L) with 2%)	9%
YouGov/Saint Louis University	August 8–16, 2024	450 (LV)	± 5.40%	52%	38%	1%	10%

=== Results ===
2024 Missouri State Treasurer election
Party	Candidate	Votes	%
Republican	Vivek Malek (incumbent)	1,684,714	57.93%
Democratic	Mark Osmack	1,106,236	38.04%
Libertarian	John Hartwig	81,443	2.80%
Green	Reagan Haas	35,745	1.23%
Total votes		2,908,138	100.00%
Republican hold			

==== By county ====
County	Vivek Malek Republican		Mark Osmack Democratic		Various candidates Other parties		Margin		Total
County	#	%	#	%	#	%	#	%	Total
Adair	6,581	66.09%	2,969	29.82%	408	4.10%	3,612	36.27%	9,958
Andrew	6,755	71.41%	2,200	23.26%	504	5.33%	4,555	48.16%	9,459
Atchison	1,934	76.35%	478	18.87%	121	4.78%	1,456	57.48%	2,533
Audrain	7,102	70.24%	2,394	23.68%	615	6.08%	4,708	46.56%	10,111
Barry	12,310	78.71%	2,626	16.79%	703	4.50%	9,684	61.92%	15,639
Barton	4,810	82.83%	771	13.28%	226	3.89%	4,039	69.55%	5,807
Bates	5,970	75.06%	1,611	20.25%	373	4.69%	4,359	54.80%	7,954
Benton	7,805	74.55%	2,027	19.36%	638	6.09%	5,778	55.19%	10,470
Bollinger	4,998	83.37%	733	12.23%	264	4.40%	4,265	71.14%	5,995
Boone	40,171	46.42%	43,204	49.92%	3,168	3.66%	-3,033	-3.50%	86,543
Buchanan	21,249	61.41%	11,805	34.12%	1,546	4.47%	9,444	27.29%	34,600
Butler	13,954	80.03%	2,969	17.03%	513	2.94%	10,985	63.00%	17,436
Caldwell	3,389	74.63%	855	18.83%	297	6.54%	2,534	55.80%	4,541
Callaway	14,474	69.58%	5,272	25.34%	1,057	5.08%	9,202	44.23%	20,803
Camden	18,463	74.86%	5,044	20.45%	1,158	4.69%	13,419	54.41%	24,665
Cape Girardeau	28,394	72.62%	9,087	23.24%	1,621	4.15%	19,307	49.38%	39,102
Carroll	3,317	76.34%	747	17.19%	281	6.47%	2,570	59.15%	4,345
Carter	2,344	84.56%	365	13.17%	63	2.27%	1,979	71.39%	2,772
Cass	36,508	63.50%	18,061	31.42%	2,922	5.08%	18,447	32.09%	57,491
Cedar	5,526	79.79%	1,049	15.15%	351	5.07%	4,477	64.64%	6,926
Chariton	2,843	73.14%	849	21.84%	195	5.02%	1,994	51.30%	3,887
Christian	37,282	75.35%	10,402	21.02%	1,794	3.63%	26,880	54.33%	49,478
Clark	2,368	74.56%	614	19.33%	194	6.11%	1,754	55.23%	3,176
Clay	65,506	51.58%	56,415	44.42%	5,081	4.00%	9,091	7.16%	127,002
Clinton	7,520	69.55%	2,725	25.20%	568	5.25%	4,795	44.34%	10,813
Cole	26,595	68.03%	10,964	28.05%	1,532	3.92%	15,631	39.99%	39,091
Cooper	6,203	71.82%	2,079	24.07%	355	4.11%	4,124	47.75%	8,637
Crawford	8,212	77.99%	1,936	18.39%	381	3.62%	6,276	59.61%	10,529
Dade	3,303	81.04%	601	14.74%	172	4.22%	2,702	66.29%	4,076
Dallas	6,446	78.81%	1,309	16.00%	424	5.18%	5,137	62.81%	8,179
Daviess	2,858	75.17%	734	19.31%	210	5.52%	2,124	55.87%	3,802
DeKalb	3,500	75.61%	860	18.58%	269	5.81%	2,640	57.03%	4,629
Dent	5,629	82.27%	951	13.90%	262	3.83%	4,678	68.37%	6,842
Douglas	5,760	82.32%	916	13.09%	321	4.59%	4,844	69.23%	6,997
Dunklin	7,481	77.28%	1,772	18.31%	427	4.41%	5,709	58.98%	9,680
Franklin	36,910	69.15%	13,819	25.89%	2,644	4.95%	23,091	43.26%	53,373
Gasconade	6,074	78.57%	1,425	18.43%	232	3.00%	4,649	60.13%	7,731
Gentry	2,393	76.28%	610	19.45%	134	4.27%	1,783	56.84%	3,137
Greene	86,358	61.12%	50,136	35.48%	4,799	3.40%	36,222	25.64%	141,293
Grundy	3,397	79.15%	741	17.26%	154	3.59%	2,656	61.88%	4,292
Harrison	3,091	82.96%	543	14.57%	92	2.47%	2,548	68.38%	3,726
Henry	7,427	70.79%	2,442	23.28%	622	5.93%	4,985	47.52%	10,491
Hickory	3,800	76.72%	896	18.09%	257	5.19%	2,904	58.63%	4,953
Holt	1,801	79.80%	342	15.15%	114	5.05%	1,459	64.64%	2,257
Howard	3,309	69.10%	1,233	25.75%	247	5.16%	2,076	43.35%	4,789
Howell	14,854	80.94%	2,803	15.27%	694	3.78%	12,051	65.67%	18,351
Iron	3,134	73.02%	867	20.20%	291	6.78%	2,267	52.82%	4,292
Jackson	120,629	38.99%	174,860	56.51%	13,925	4.50%	-54,231	-17.53%	309,414
Jasper	38,044	72.26%	12,619	23.97%	1,985	3.77%	25,425	48.29%	52,648
Jefferson	74,085	64.73%	35,135	30.70%	5,227	4.57%	38,950	34.03%	114,447
Johnson	15,447	67.14%	6,419	27.90%	1,140	4.96%	9,028	39.24%	23,006
Knox	1,255	76.62%	301	18.38%	82	5.01%	954	58.24%	1,638
Laclede	13,742	81.68%	2,465	14.65%	618	3.67%	11,277	67.03%	16,825
Lafayette	12,049	71.38%	4,109	24.34%	723	4.28%	7,940	47.04%	16,881
Lawrence	13,986	78.73%	2,988	16.82%	791	4.45%	10,998	61.91%	17,765
Lewis	3,241	75.14%	849	19.68%	223	5.17%	2,392	55.46%	4,313
Lincoln	22,912	73.96%	6,842	22.09%	1,226	3.96%	16,070	51.87%	30,980
Linn	3,907	71.27%	1,230	22.44%	345	6.29%	2,677	48.83%	5,482
Livingston	5,002	75.66%	1,309	19.80%	300	4.54%	3,693	55.86%	6,611
Macon	5,995	78.54%	1,396	18.29%	242	3.17%	4,599	60.25%	7,633
Madison	4,275	77.07%	981	17.69%	291	5.25%	3,294	59.38%	5,547
Maries	3,791	81.46%	716	15.38%	147	3.16%	3,075	66.07%	4,654
Marion	9,252	72.74%	2,862	22.50%	606	4.76%	6,390	50.24%	12,720
McDonald	7,439	81.52%	1,363	14.94%	323	3.54%	6,076	66.59%	9,125
Mercer	1,441	83.97%	222	12.94%	53	3.09%	1,219	71.04%	1,716
Miller	9,902	79.57%	1,870	15.03%	673	5.41%	8,032	64.54%	12,445
Mississippi	3,009	71.40%	959	22.76%	246	5.84%	2,050	48.65%	4,214
Moniteau	5,507	78.34%	1,153	16.40%	370	5.26%	4,354	61.93%	7,030
Monroe	3,157	75.29%	832	19.84%	204	4.87%	2,325	55.45%	4,193
Montgomery	4,497	77.45%	1,080	18.60%	229	3.94%	3,417	58.85%	5,806
Morgan	7,116	76.31%	1,679	18.01%	530	5.68%	5,437	58.31%	9,325
New Madrid	4,708	72.19%	1,471	22.55%	343	5.26%	3,237	49.63%	6,522
Newton	22,171	77.63%	5,468	19.15%	921	3.22%	16,703	58.48%	28,560
Nodaway	6,606	70.09%	2,501	26.54%	318	3.37%	4,105	43.55%	9,425
Oregon	3,494	79.35%	712	16.17%	197	4.47%	2,782	63.18%	4,403
Osage	6,386	85.01%	928	12.35%	198	2.64%	5,458	72.66%	7,512
Ozark	3,810	83.01%	592	12.90%	188	4.10%	3,218	70.11%	4,590
Pemiscot	3,615	72.39%	1,252	25.07%	127	2.54%	2,363	47.32%	4,994
Perry	7,401	79.98%	1,528	16.51%	325	3.51%	5,873	63.46%	9,254
Pettis	13,250	71.82%	4,330	23.47%	868	4.71%	8,920	48.35%	18,448
Phelps	13,205	70.07%	4,887	25.93%	754	4.00%	8,318	44.14%	18,846
Pike	5,772	76.18%	1,549	20.44%	256	3.38%	4,223	55.73%	7,577
Platte	29,502	52.00%	25,160	44.34%	2,078	3.66%	4,342	7.65%	56,740
Polk	12,437	80.09%	2,563	16.51%	528	3.40%	9,874	63.59%	15,528
Pulaski	10,781	71.75%	3,308	22.02%	936	6.23%	7,473	49.74%	15,025
Putnam	1,814	79.56%	309	13.55%	157	6.89%	1,505	66.01%	2,280
Ralls	4,208	75.44%	1,092	19.58%	278	4.98%	3,116	55.86%	5,578
Randolph	7,712	72.15%	2,415	22.59%	562	5.26%	5,297	49.56%	10,689
Ray	7,500	67.09%	2,872	25.69%	807	7.22%	4,628	41.40%	11,179
Reynolds	2,154	75.63%	514	18.05%	180	6.32%	1,640	57.58%	2,848
Ripley	4,449	80.32%	779	14.06%	311	5.61%	3,670	66.26%	5,539
Saline	5,969	65.75%	2,506	27.60%	604	6.65%	3,463	38.14%	9,079
Schuyler	1,406	76.08%	311	16.83%	131	7.09%	1,095	59.25%	1,848
Scotland	1,415	78.35%	319	17.66%	72	3.99%	1,096	60.69%	1,806
Scott	12,981	76.72%	3,359	19.85%	579	3.42%	9,622	56.87%	16,919
Shannon	2,974	78.06%	637	16.72%	199	5.22%	2,337	61.34%	3,810
Shelby	2,391	76.78%	579	18.59%	144	4.62%	1,812	58.19%	3,114
St. Charles	126,544	58.13%	83,061	38.15%	8,090	3.72%	43,483	19.97%	217,695
St. Clair	3,862	78.43%	918	18.64%	144	2.92%	2,944	59.79%	4,924
St. Francois	19,527	71.85%	6,456	23.76%	1,194	4.39%	13,071	48.10%	27,177
St. Louis City	20,158	17.80%	88,602	78.22%	4,518	3.99%	-68,444	-60.42%	113,278
St. Louis County	197,310	40.04%	280,190	56.86%	15,285	3.10%	-82,880	-16.82%	492,785
Ste. Genevieve	6,226	67.74%	2,582	28.09%	383	4.17%	3,644	39.65%	9,191
Stoddard	10,884	82.61%	1,783	13.53%	508	3.86%	9,101	69.08%	13,175
Stone	14,787	79.52%	3,169	17.04%	640	3.44%	11,618	62.48%	18,596
Sullivan	1,900	79.63%	402	16.85%	84	3.52%	1,498	62.78%	2,386
Taney	20,184	77.89%	4,720	18.21%	1,009	3.89%	15,464	59.68%	25,913
Texas	9,216	82.00%	1,544	13.74%	479	4.26%	7,672	68.26%	11,239
Vernon	6,674	76.85%	1,684	19.39%	327	3.77%	4,990	57.46%	8,685
Warren	14,101	72.66%	4,621	23.81%	685	3.53%	9,480	48.85%	19,407
Washington	7,329	75.13%	1,823	18.69%	603	6.18%	5,506	56.44%	9,755
Wayne	4,545	81.04%	821	14.64%	242	4.32%	3,724	66.41%	5,608
Webster	15,106	78.38%	3,320	17.23%	846	4.39%	11,786	61.16%	19,272
Worth	828	78.71%	183	17.40%	41	3.90%	645	61.31%	1,052
Wright	7,634	86.59%	926	10.50%	256	2.90%	6,708	76.09%	8,816
Totals	1,684,714	57.93%	1,106,236	38.04%	117,188	4.03%	578,478	19.89%	2,908,138

==== By congressional district ====
Malek won six of eight congressional districts.

District	Malek	Osmack	Representative
1st	22%	75%	Cori Bush (118th Congress)
1st	22%	75%	Wesley Bell (119th Congress)
2nd	55%	42%	Ann Wagner
3rd	62%	33%	Blaine Luetkemeyer (118th Congress)
3rd	62%	33%	Bob Onder (119th Congress)
4th	68%	27%	Mark Alford
5th	37%	58%	Emanuel Cleaver
6th	67%	29%	Sam Graves
7th	71%	26%	Eric Burlison
8th	74%	22%	Jason Smith

== Notes ==
Partisan clients
