= Todd Richardson =

American politician

Speaker of the Missouri House of Representatives
- In office May 14, 2015 – October 31, 2018
- Preceded by: John Diehl
- Succeeded by: Elijah Haahr

Member of the Missouri House of Representatives from the 152nd district
- In office January 2013 – October 2018
- Preceded by: Paul Fitzwater
- Succeeded by: Hardy Billington

Member of the Missouri House of Representatives from the 154th district
- In office January 2011 – January 2013
- Preceded by: Gayle Kingery
- Succeeded by: Shawn Rhoads

Personal details
- Born: December 26, 1976 (age 49) Cape Girardeau, Missouri, U.S.
- Party: Republican
- Education: University of Memphis (BA, JD)

Todd Richardson (born December 26, 1976) is an American politician. A member of the Republican Party, Richardson represented the 152nd district in the Missouri House of Representatives from 2013 to 2019. He is from Poplar Bluff, Missouri. Richardson previously represented Missouri's 154th House district from 2011 to 2013. He was elected Speaker of the Missouri House of Representatives in 2015.

His father Mark served for 12 years as a Republican in the Missouri House of Representatives. Richardson was named a 2014 Aspen Institute Rodel Fellow.

Richardson resigned his seat in the Legislature in October 2018, a few months before his fourth and final term would have ended in January, 2019. Governor Mike Parson appointed him to serve as the director of MO HealthNet, Missouri's Medicaid program.

== Electoral history ==
Missouri's 154th District House of Representatives election, 2010
Party	Candidate	Votes	%
Republican	Todd Richardson	6,935	69.70
Democratic	Ron Yarbro	3,011	30.30
Total votes		9,946	100

2012 General Election for Missouri's 152nd District House of Representatives
Party	Candidate	Votes	%
Republican	Todd Richardson	11,572	100
Total votes		11,572	100

2014 General Election for Missouri's 152nd District House of Representatives
Party	Candidate	Votes	%
Republican	Todd Richardson (incumbent)	5,709	100
Total votes		5,709	100

2016 General Election for Missouri's 152nd District House of Representatives
Party	Candidate	Votes	%
Republican	Todd Richardson (incumbent)	12,108	100
Total votes		12,108	100

Political offices
Preceded by John Diehl	Speaker of the Missouri House of Representatives; 2015–2019	Succeeded by Elijah Haahr
