= Long & Foster =

American real estate company

The Long & Foster Companies
- Type: Subsidiary
- Industry: Real estate
- Founded: May 22, 1968; 58 years ago, in Fairfax, Virginia, U.S.
- Headquarters: 3975 Fair Ridge Drive; Fairfax, Virginia, U.S.
- Area served: Mid-Atlantic and Northeast regions
- Key people: Daniel Dennis (CEO and president)
- Parent: HomeServices of America
- Website: www.longandfoster.com

Long & Foster Real Estate is part of The Long & Foster Companies, a subsidiary of HomeServices of America. HomeServices is one of the nation’s largest real estate brokerages and providers of integrated real estate services.

== History ==
In 1968, P. Wesley "Wes" Foster Jr. co-founded Long & Foster with Henry "Hank" Long. Long & Foster began with Foster handling the residential real estate arm of the business and Long handling the commercial side. Foster became the sole owner in July 1979, 11 years after establishing Long & Foster. Foster is the chief executive officer and chairman. Foster began his real estate career in 1963 as a sales manager at Minchew Corporation, a home building company. In 1966, he moved to Nelson Realty as vice president of sales before founding Long & Foster. In March 2023, Wes Foster died.

In October 2026, Long & Foster announced that Daniel Dennis had been appointed as its President and CEO. Dennis brings over two decades of extensive brokerage, luxury and national industry experience to the position. He succeeds Patrick Bain, who left following a 16-year career with Long & Foster, including three and a half as CEO and president.

== Overview ==
The Long & Foster Companies is the parent company of Long & Foster Real Estate, Prosperity Home Mortgage, LLC, Long & Foster Insurance, and Mid-States Title, as well as HomeServices Property Management, Insight Home Inspections, Long & Foster Vacation Rentals and Long & Foster Corporate Real Estate Services.

Long & Foster Real Estate is a member of Forbes Global Properties, and it is a founding affiliate of Leading Real Estate Companies of the World, a prestigious global network of real estate professionals that includes the Luxury Portfolio International division.

Long & Foster has over 7,000 agents and employees in more than 100 sales offices in the Mid-Atlantic and Northeast regions. It is part of The Long & Foster Companies, a family of businesses in the real estate and financial services industries. In September 2017, Berkshire Hathaway's HomeServices of America bought Long & Foster.

== Operations ==
Long & Foster has offices and associates in Delaware, Maryland, New Jersey, North Carolina, Pennsylvania, Virginia, Washington, D.C. and, West Virginia. The company has multiple lines of business that support buying, selling and owning real estate including the sale and purchase of residential (existing and new construction) and commercial properties and land; mortgage, title and settlement services, insurance and home warranties, home inspections, moving services, property management, vacation rentals, and corporate real estate services for relocation and business development.
