= Elijah Haahr =

American politician

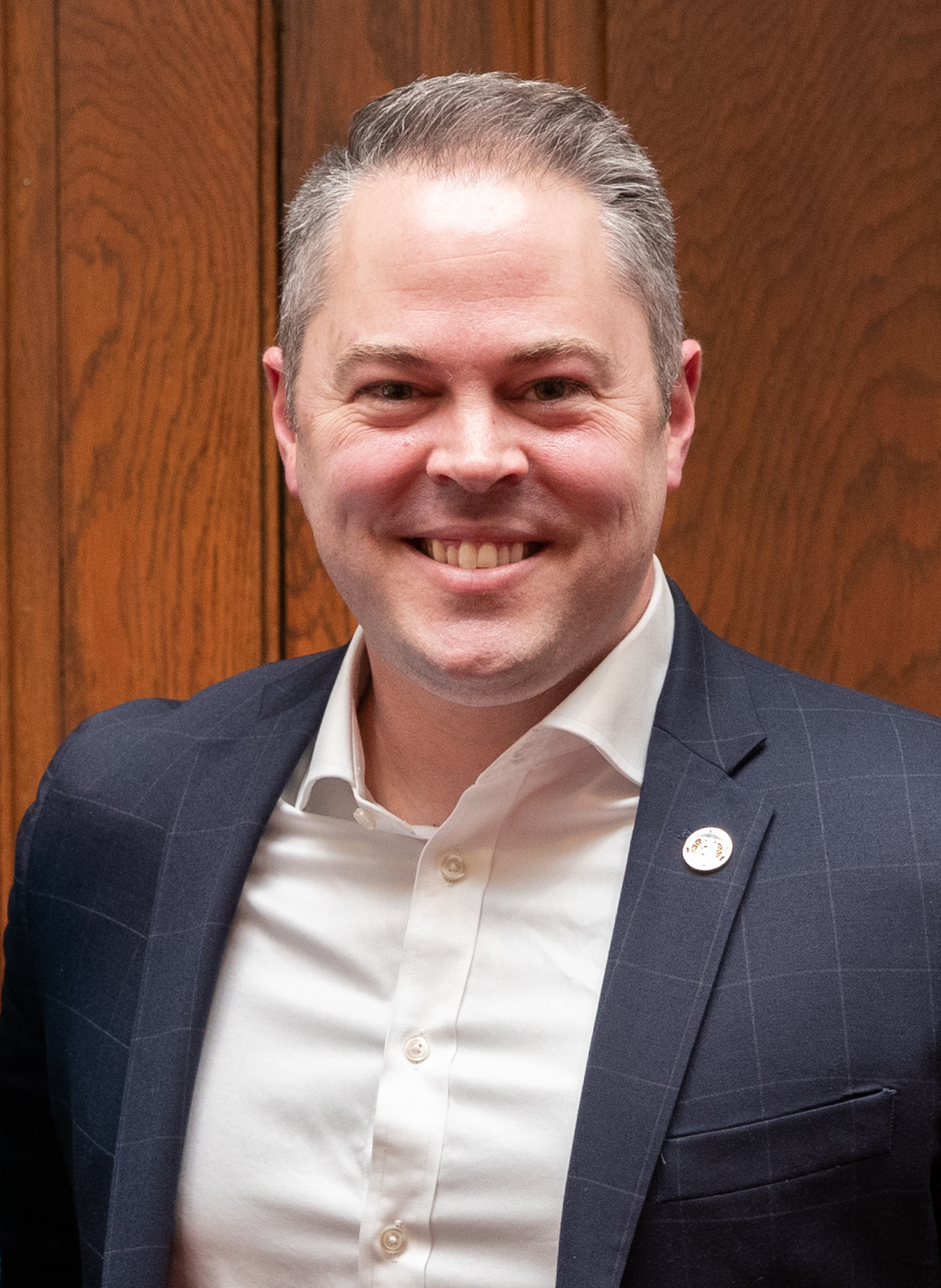

Speaker of the Missouri House of Representatives
- In office November 1, 2018 – January 6, 2021
- Preceded by: Todd Richardson
- Succeeded by: Rob Vescovo

Speaker pro tempore of the Missouri House of Representatives
- In office January 4, 2017 – November 1, 2018
- Preceded by: Denny Hoskins
- Succeeded by: John Wiemann

Member of the Missouri House of Representatives from the 134th district
- In office January 9, 2013 – January 6, 2021
- Preceded by: Thomas Long
- Succeeded by: Alex Riley

Personal details
- Born: May 28, 1982 (age 44)
- Party: Republican
- Children: 4
- Education: Ozarks Technical Community College (AA); Missouri Western State University (BA); University of Missouri (JD)

Elijah J. L. Haahr (born May 28, 1982) is an American attorney and politician who served as a member of the Missouri House of Representatives, for the 134th district from 2013 to 2021. He is a member of the Republican Party.

== Early life and education ==
Haahr grew up in southwest Missouri. He attended Ozarks Technical Community College and was a member of the National Dean's List and Phi Theta Kappa. After graduating from OTC with honors in 2002, Haahr received an academic scholarship to attend Missouri Western State University. He graduated cum laude from MWSU in 2005. He then attended the University of Missouri School of Law on academic scholarship and graduated with honors in 2008. At MU, he served as editor in chief of the Environmental Law Review and represented MU at the regional level in mock trial and moot court competitions.

== Career ==
Haahr is an attorney with Kutak Rock and focuses on product liability and personal injury. He is licensed to practice in Missouri and Oklahoma.

During his time in the Missouri House of Representatives, Haahr chaired the Emerging Issues Committee and served as Speaker Pro Tem. In September 2017, he was elected to serve as Speaker of House starting in January 2019. He is the only Speaker in Missouri history from Springfield.

In 2019, Haahr spoke in favor of a criminal justice reform measure to undo mandatory minimum sentencing laws for nonviolent offenders and give judges the discretion to determine sentencing on the basis of the offender's character, rehabilitation prospects and threat to society.

In 2019, he spoke in favor of overturning voter-approved redistricting rules whereby a nonpartisan state demographer, with the 70% approval of a citizen commission, would re-draw legislative districts every year. The rules also included requirements that the districts be drawn to make them competitive. According to an Associated Press analysis, those rules would likely reduce the Republican Party's supermajorities in the Missouri General Assembly.

== Electoral history ==
=== State representative ===
2018 General Election for Missouri's 134th District House of Representatives
Party	Candidate	Votes	%
Republican	Elijah Haahr	8,703	56.95
Democratic	Derrick Nowlin	6,575	43.04
Total votes		15,278	100

2018 Primary Election for Missouri's 134th District House of Representatives
Party	Candidate	Votes	%
Republican	Elijah Haahr	3,069	74.45
Republican	Daniel Romine	1,053	25.55
Total votes		4,122	100

2016 General Election for Missouri's 134th District House of Representatives
Party	Candidate	Votes	%
Republican	Elijah Haahr	9,901	58.40
Democratic	Angela Dowler Pryor	6,313	37.23
Libertarian	Daniel A. Romine	741	4.37
Total votes		16,955	100

2014 General Election for Missouri's 134th District House of Representatives
Party	Candidate	Votes	%
Republican	Elijah Haahr	5,214	64.19
Democratic	Kevin Knox	2,909	35.81
Total votes		8,123	100

2012 General Election for Missouri's 134th District House of Representatives
Party	Candidate	Votes	%
Republican	Elijah Haahr	9,227	56.04
Democratic	James M. Owen	7,239	43.96
Total votes		16,466	100

2012 Primary Election for Missouri's 134th District House of Representatives
Party	Candidate	Votes	%
Republican	Elijah Haahr	2,186	56.57
Republican	John Sellars	1,678	43.43
Total votes		3,864	100

== Personal life ==
Elijah lives in Springfield with his four children. He is a member of the National Rifle Association.

Missouri House of Representatives
Preceded by Denny Hoskins	Speaker pro tempore of the Missouri House of Representatives; 2017–2018	Succeeded by John Wiemann
Political offices
Preceded by Todd Richardson	Speaker of the Missouri House of Representatives; 2018–2021	Succeeded by Rob Vescovo
