= John Diehl (politician) =

American politician

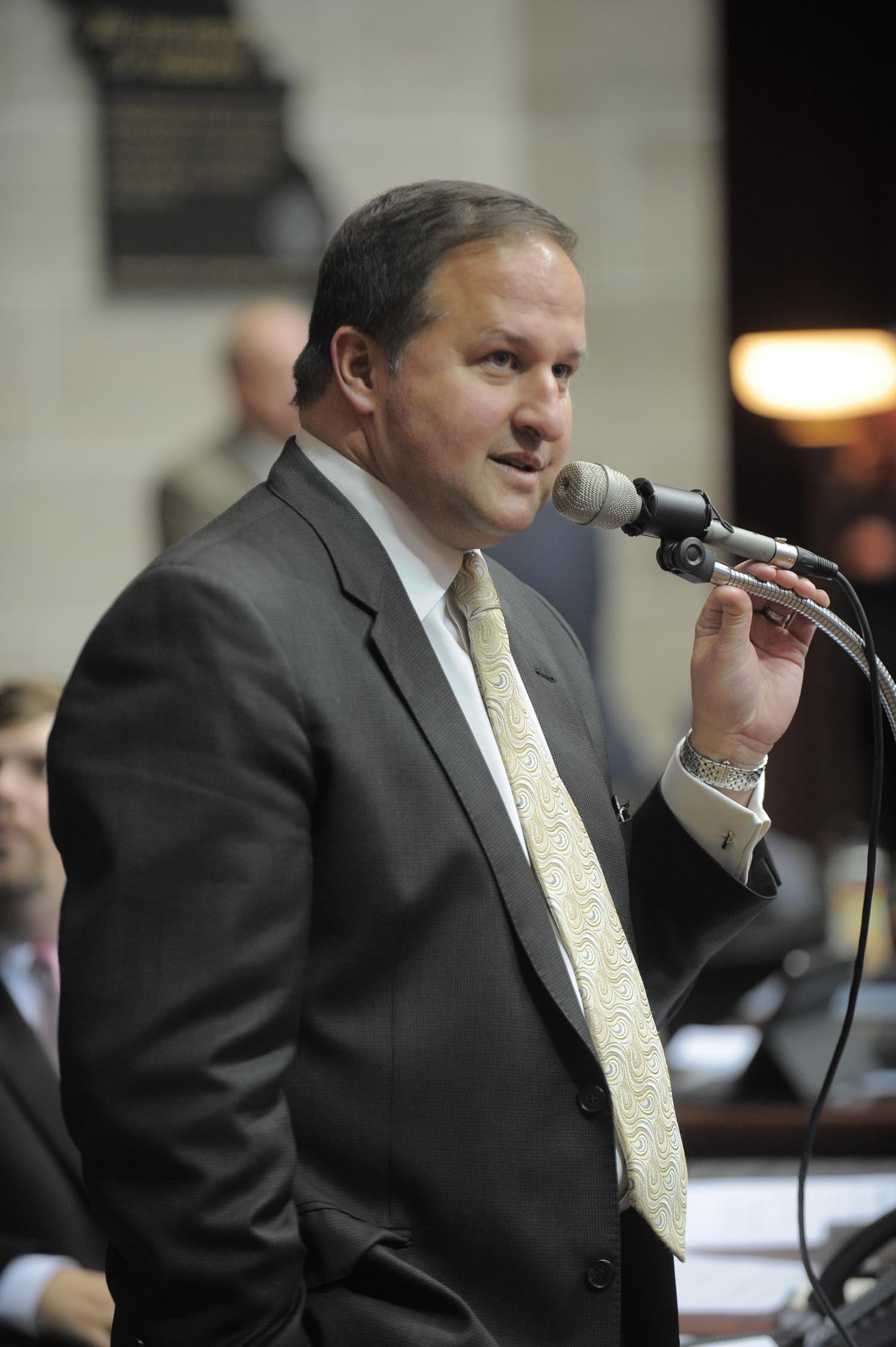

Speaker of the Missouri House of Representatives
- In office January 7, 2015 – May 14, 2015
- Preceded by: Tim Jones
- Succeeded by: Todd Richardson

Member of the Missouri House of Representatives from the 89th district
- In office January 2013 – May 14, 2015
- Preceded by: Tim Jones

Member of the Missouri House of Representatives from the 87th district
- In office January 2009 – January 2013
- Preceded by: Scott Muschany
- Succeeded by: Stacey Newman

Personal details
- Born: August 28, 1965 (age 60) St. Louis, Missouri, U.S.
- Party: Republican
- Spouse: Kelly
- Children: 3
- Education: University of Missouri, Columbia; St. Louis University
- Website: Campaign Website

John J. Diehl Jr. (born August 28, 1965) is an American attorney and a Republican former member of the Missouri House of Representatives. Diehl was elected Speaker of the Missouri House of Representatives in 2013 and took office in January 2015. Diehl resigned on May 14, 2015 after a scandal came to light regarding inappropriate messages exchanged with an intern. In 2025, Diehl pleaded guilty to federal wire fraud charges for defrauding the government in $379,000 in COVID-19 pandemic relief funds. He was sentenced to 21 months in prison.

== Early life and political career ==
Diehl graduated from De Smet Jesuit High School in Creve Coeur in 1983. He graduated from the University of Missouri in 1987 with a degree in political science. He received a J.D. degree from St. Louis University in 1991. Diehl is married, has three sons, and attends Our Lady of the Pillar parish in Creve Coeur.

Diehl was named Town and Country and Frontenac Chamber of Commerce's 2006 businessman of the year and was on the Town and Country and Frontenac Chamber of Commerce executive committee from 2004 to 2007. He has been chairman of the St. Louis County Board of Election Commissioners, chairman of the Town and Country Police Commission, chairman of Town and Country Conservation Commission, a member of the Town and Country Architectural Review Board, chairman of the Town and Country Longview House Renovation Committee, on the Governor's Advisory Council on DWI, Town and Country ombudsman to the West County EMS and Fire Protection District, and a member of the International Association of Clerks, Recorders, Election Officials and Treasurers Election Center. He was also a member of the Town and Country Board of Aldermen from the first ward. He was in that position from 2003 to 2005 and he served as president of the board from 2004 to 2005.

== Career in the Missouri House ==
In 2008, he was elected to serve in the Missouri House of Representatives. He represented the 89th district, which includes Ballwin, Chesterfield, Country Life Acres, Crystal Lake Park, Des Peres, Frontenac, Huntleigh, Kirkwood, Ladue, Manchester, and Town and Country, from 2009 to 2015. Prior to redistricting he represented the 87th district from 2009 to 2012.

He was chairman of the powerful Rules Committee and Special Standing Committee on Redistricting and served as House Majority Floor Leader in 2013. In September 2013, Rep. Diehl was elected Speaker-Designee, and became the Speaker of the Missouri House in 2015.

=== Committee assignments ===
==== 2010 ====
- Special Standing Committee on Redistricting (chairman)
- House Elections Committee (Vice-chairman)

==== 2013 ====
- Ex officio member of all committees of the House
- Ethics (chairman)
- Joint Committee on Tax Policy
- Leadership for Missouri Issue Development
- Interim Committee on Election Procedures

==== 2014 ====
- Ex officio member of all committees of the House
- Ethics (chairman)
- Joint Committee on Tax Policy
- Leadership for Missouri Issue Development
- Interim Committee on Election Procedures

==== 2015 ====
- Ex officio member of all committees of the House
- Joint Committee on Tax Policy

=== Sexting controversy and resignation ===
On April 24, 2015, The Kansas City Star contacted Diehl about exchanges of sexually suggestive text messages between himself and a female House intern, who was then a college freshman. The internship program had been abruptly canceled in April 2015 after Missouri Southern State University discovered an "unspecified incident" with a student, which analysts say was likely Diehl's affair. A few hours after the Star published a report of the exchanges on May 13, Diehl admitted responsibility, stating, "I will begin immediately working to restore the trust of those closest to me and getting back to the important work that is required in the final days of session." However, he resigned May 14. He was replaced by Todd Richardson of Poplar Bluff.

=== Campaign finance violations ===
In 2023, a Missouri Ethics Commission audit found a bank account Diehl opened in 2015 and held unreported campaign contributions up to $52,000.

== Electoral history ==
2012 General Election for Missouri's 87th District House of Representatives
Party	Candidate	Votes	%	±%
Republican	John J. Diehl, Jr.	18,474	100.0	

2010 General Election for Missouri's 87th District House of Representatives
Party	Candidate	Votes	%	±%
Republican	John J. Diehl, Jr.	12,479	97.71	

2008 General Election for Missouri's 87th District House of Representatives
Party	Candidate	Votes	%	±%
Republican	John J. Diehl, Jr.	12,572	60.04	
Democratic	Mark Zoole	8,352	39.89	

2003 general Election for Town and Country's 1st Ward Board of Aldermen
Party	Candidate	Votes	%	±%
Nonpartisan	John J. Diehl, Jr.	435	68.72	
Nonpartisan	Harry J. Nichols	198	31.28	

Political offices
Preceded by Tim Jones	Speaker of the Missouri House of Representatives; 2015	Succeeded by Todd Richardson
