= 2024 Missouri Attorney General election =

- November 5, 2024
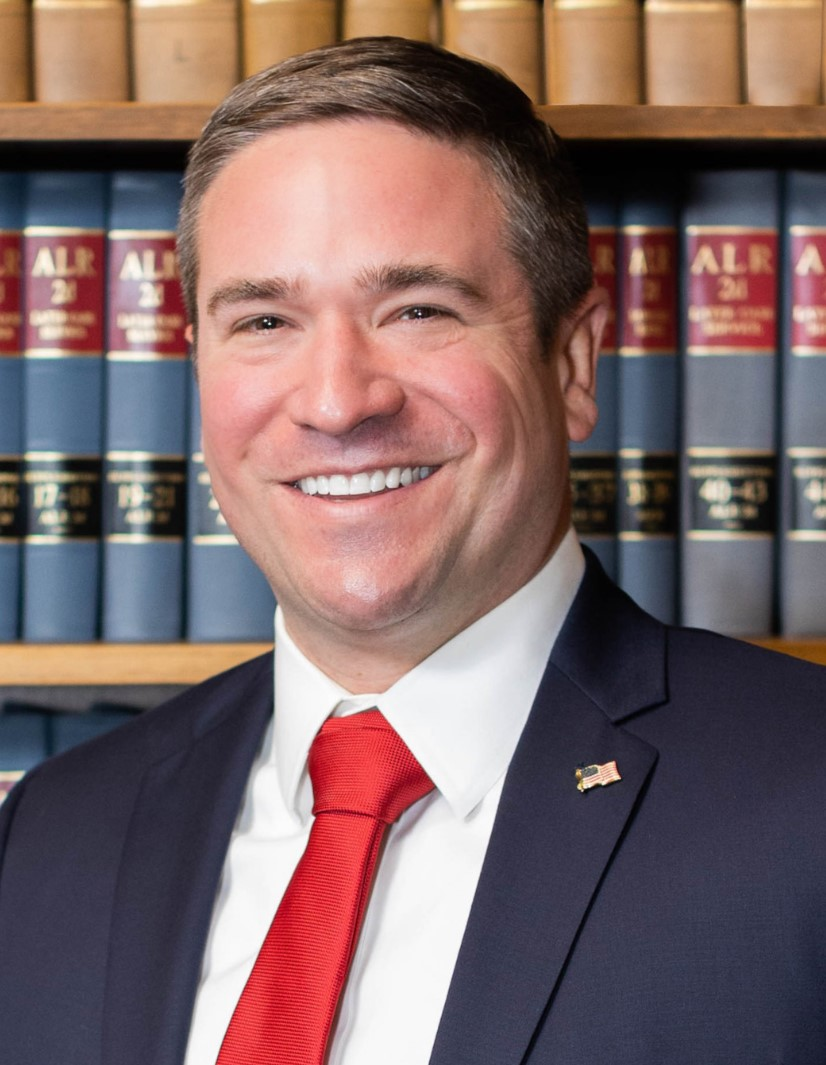

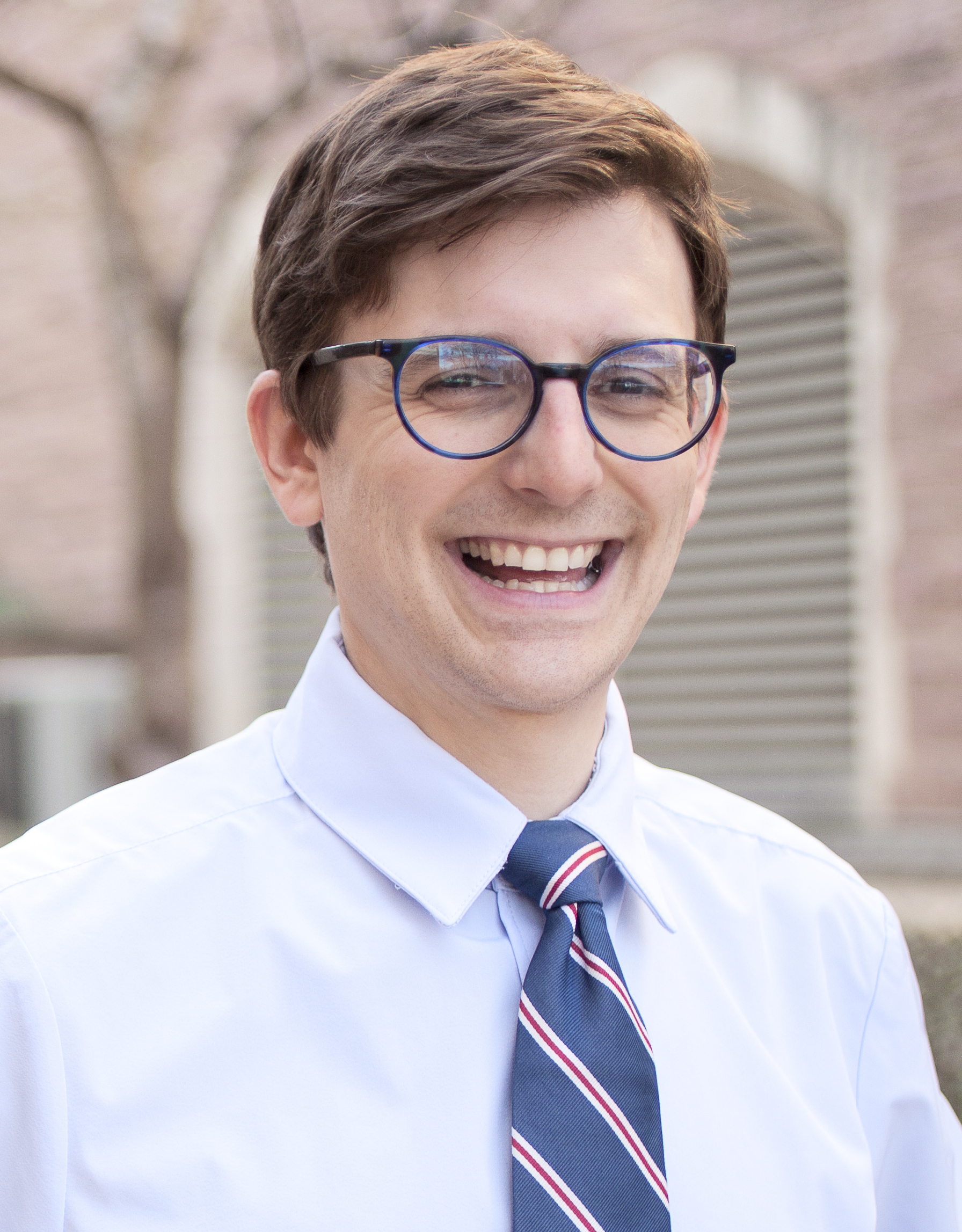
Nominee	Andrew Bailey	Elad Gross
Party	Republican	Democratic
Popular vote	1,739,626	1,103,482
Percentage	59.78%	37.92%
- Bailey: 40–50% 50–60% 60–70% 70–80% 80–90% >90% Gross: 40–50% 50–60% 60–70% 70–80% 80–90% >90% Tie: 40–50% 50% No votes
Attorney General before election
Andrew Bailey
Republican
Elected Attorney General
Andrew Bailey
Republican

The 2024 Missouri Attorney General election was held on November 5, 2024, to elect the attorney general of the state of Missouri. It coincided with the concurrent presidential election, as well as various state and local elections, including for U.S. Senate, U.S. House, and governor of Missouri. Primary elections took place on August 6, 2024. Incumbent Andrew Bailey won the Republican nomination, while Elad Gross won the Democratic nomination.

In the general election, Bailey won about 60 percent of the vote, defeating Gross. This marked Bailey's first election to a full term in office, as he was previously appointed in 2022 by Missouri governor Mike Parson to succeed outgoing Attorney General Eric Schmitt upon Schmitt's election to the U.S. Senate.

== Republican primary ==
=== Candidates ===
==== Nominee ====
- Andrew Bailey, incumbent attorney general

==== Eliminated in primary ====
- Will Scharf, attorney for Donald Trump and former assistant U.S. Attorney

=== Endorsements ===
Andrew Bailey

Executive Branch Officials

- Donald Trump, former President of the United States (2017–2021) (co-endorsement with Scharf)

U.S. Senators

- Josh Hawley, U.S. Senator from Missouri (2019–present)
- Eric Schmitt, U.S. Senator from Missouri (2023–present)

Statewide officials

- Mike Parson, Governor of Missouri (2018–2025)

Organizations

- Eagle Forum
- Missouri Right to Life PAC (co-endorsement with Scharf)
Will Scharf

Executive Branch Officials

- Donald Trump, former President of the United States (2017–2021) (co-endorsement with Bailey)

Statewide officials

- Ken Paxton, Attorney General of Texas

Individuals

- Charlie Kirk, founder of Turning Point USA
- Mark Levin, author and talk radio host

Organizations

- Club for Growth PAC
- Missouri Right to Life PAC (co-endorsement with Bailey)

=== Polling ===
Poll source	Date(s) administered	Sample size (Note: Key: A – all adults RV – registered voters LV – likely voters V – unclear)	Margin of error	Andrew Bailey	Will Scharf	Undecided
Battleground Connect (R) (Note: Poll sponsored by the Missouri Scout)	July 30–31, 2024	896 (LV)	± 3.1%	41%	30%	29%
Remington Research Group (R)	July 22–24, 2024	864 (LV)	± 3.3%	36%	31%	33%
co/efficient (R)	July 21–22, 2024	981 (LV)	± 3.92%	27%	17%	56%
co/efficient (R) (Note: Poll sponsored by Bailey's campaign)	July 10–11, 2024	909 (LV)	± 3.25%	34%	13%	53%
Public Opinion Strategies (Note: Poll sponsored by Liberty and Justice PAC, which supports Bailey)	June 20–24, 2024	500 (V)	± 4.38%	52%	19%	39%
Remington Research (R)	June 19–20, 2024	701 (LV)	± 3.6%	27%	23%	50%
WPA Intelligence (Note: Poll sponsored by Club for Growth, which supports Scharf)	June 2–4, 2024	502 (LV)	± 4.4%	35%	17%	48%
Remington Research (R)	February 14–15, 2024	706 (LV)	± 3.6%	24%	18%	58%
Remington Research (R)	January 17–18, 2024	806 (LV)	± 3.3%	24%	17%	59%
Remington Research (R)	September 27–28, 2023	714 (LV)	± 3.4%	26%	15%	59%
Remington Research (R)	July 5–7, 2023	706 (LV)	± 3.4%	25%	14%	61%
Remington Research (R)	April 11–12, 2023	778 (LV)	± 3.4%	24%	14%	62%
Remington Research (R)	February 8–9, 2023	820 (LV)	± 3.2%	10%	10%	80%

=== Results ===
Results by county: Bailey: 70–80%; 60–70%; 50–60%

Republican primary results
Party	Candidate	Votes	%
Republican	Andrew Bailey (incumbent)	413,465	63.0
Republican	Will Scharf	242,680	37.0
Total votes		656,145	100.0

== Democratic primary ==
=== Candidates ===
==== Nominee ====
- Elad Gross, civil rights attorney, former assistant attorney general, and candidate for attorney general in 2020

==== Withdrawn ====
- Sarah Unsicker, state representative from the 83rd district (ran for governor)

==== Endorsements ====
Elad Gross

Newspapers

- St. Louis Post-Dispatch

=== Polling ===
Poll source	Date(s) administered	Sample size	Margin of error	Elad Gross	Sarah Unsicker	Undecided
Remington Research Group	July 12–13, 2023	661 (LV)	± 3.9%	13%	24%	63%

=== Results ===
Democratic primary results
Party	Candidate	Votes	%
Democratic	Elad Gross	343,934	100.00%
Total votes		343,934	100.00%

== Libertarian primary ==
=== Candidates ===
==== Nominee ====
- Ryan Munro, attorney

=== Results ===
Libertarian primary results
Party	Candidate	Votes	%
Libertarian	Ryan Munro	2,401	100.00%
Total votes		2,401	100.00%

== General election ==
=== Predictions ===
Source	Ranking	As of
Sabato's Crystal Ball	Safe R	July 25, 2024

=== Polling ===
Poll source	Date(s) administered	Sample size	Margin of error	Andrew Bailey (R)	Elad Gross (D)	Other	Undecided
ActiVote	October 8–27, 2024	400 (LV)	± 4.9%	57%	43%	–	–
ActiVote	September 6 – October 13, 2024	400 (LV)	± 4.9%	60%	40%	–	–
Remington Research Group	October 2–3, 2024	753 (LV)	± 3.2%	51%	42%	1% (Note: Munro (L) with 1%)	6%
YouGov/Saint Louis University	August 8–16, 2024	450 (LV)	± 5.40%	51%	38%	1%	9%
Remington Research Group	March 6–8, 2024	713 (LV)	± 3.9%	50%	35%	–	15%

=== Results ===
2024 Missouri Attorney General election
Party	Candidate	Votes	%	±%
Republican	Andrew Bailey (incumbent)	1,739,626	59.78%	+0.40%
Democratic	Elad Gross	1,103,482	37.92%	+0.05%
Libertarian	Ryan Munro	66,878	2.30%	−0.45%
Total votes		2,909,986	100.00%	N/A
Republican hold				

==== By county ====
County	Andrew Bailey Republican		Elad Gross Democratic		Ryan Munro Libertarian		Margin		Total
County	#	%	#	%	#	%	#	%	Total
Adair	6,798	68.40%	2,927	29.45%	213	2.14%	3,871	38.95%	9,938
Andrew	7,305	76.98%	2,000	21.07%	185	1.95%	5,305	55.90%	9,490
Atchison	2,079	81.66%	405	15.91%	62	2.44%	1,674	65.75%	2,546
Audrain	7,642	75.25%	2,264	22.29%	249	2.45%	5,378	52.96%	10,155
Barry	12,889	82.37%	2,452	15.67%	306	1.96%	10,437	66.70%	15,647
Barton	5,019	86.34%	690	11.87%	104	1.79%	4,329	74.47%	5,813
Bates	6,427	80.62%	1,378	17.29%	167	2.09%	5,049	63.33%	7,972
Benton	8,355	79.80%	1,886	18.01%	229	2.19%	6,469	61.79%	10,470
Bollinger	5,206	86.98%	675	11.28%	104	1.74%	4,531	75.71%	5,985
Boone	40,005	46.21%	44,361	51.24%	2,213	2.56%	-4,356	-5.03%	86,579
Buchanan	22,416	64.77%	11,289	32.62%	906	2.62%	11,127	32.15%	34,611
Butler	14,334	82.18%	2,815	16.14%	293	1.68%	11,519	66.04%	17,442
Caldwell	3,687	80.71%	761	16.66%	120	2.63%	2,926	64.05%	4,568
Callaway	15,010	72.04%	5,228	25.09%	597	2.87%	9,782	46.95%	20,835
Camden	19,225	77.96%	4,876	19.77%	558	2.26%	14,349	58.19%	24,659
Cape Girardeau	29,030	74.42%	9,132	23.41%	848	2.17%	19,898	51.01%	39,010
Carroll	3,616	82.92%	652	14.95%	93	2.13%	2,964	67.97%	4,361
Carter	2,406	86.92%	329	11.89%	33	1.19%	2,077	75.04%	2,768
Cass	38,362	66.73%	17,535	30.50%	1,591	2.77%	20,827	36.23%	57,488
Cedar	5,818	84.06%	934	13.50%	169	2.44%	4,884	70.57%	6,921
Chariton	3,077	78.98%	738	18.94%	81	2.08%	2,339	60.04%	3,896
Christian	38,160	77.10%	10,189	20.59%	1,142	2.31%	27,971	56.52%	49,491
Clark	2,554	80.31%	550	17.30%	76	2.39%	2,004	63.02%	3,180
Clay	68,097	53.61%	55,686	43.84%	3,229	2.54%	12,411	9.77%	127,012
Clinton	8,038	74.13%	2,525	23.29%	280	2.58%	5,513	50.84%	10,843
Cole	26,922	68.83%	11,270	28.81%	924	2.36%	15,652	40.01%	39,116
Cooper	6,425	74.15%	2,042	23.57%	198	2.29%	4,383	50.58%	8,665
Crawford	8,487	80.54%	1,877	17.81%	174	1.65%	6,610	62.73%	10,538
Dade	3,449	84.64%	547	13.42%	79	1.94%	2,902	71.21%	4,075
Dallas	6,765	82.70%	1,234	15.09%	181	2.21%	5,531	67.62%	8,180
Daviess	3,067	80.60%	636	16.71%	102	2.68%	2,431	63.89%	3,805
DeKalb	3,753	80.87%	785	16.91%	103	2.22%	2,968	63.95%	4,641
Dent	5,831	84.93%	902	13.14%	133	1.94%	4,929	71.79%	6,866
Douglas	6,005	85.63%	869	12.39%	139	1.98%	5,136	73.24%	7,013
Dunklin	7,923	81.82%	1,584	16.36%	176	1.82%	6,339	65.47%	9,683
Franklin	39,322	73.32%	13,029	24.29%	1,281	2.39%	26,293	49.02%	53,632
Gasconade	6,254	80.48%	1,402	18.04%	115	1.48%	4,852	62.44%	7,771
Gentry	2,591	82.20%	518	16.43%	43	1.36%	2,073	65.77%	3,152
Greene	87,098	61.70%	50,821	36.00%	3,241	2.30%	36,277	25.70%	141,160
Grundy	3,562	82.91%	666	15.50%	68	1.58%	2,896	67.41%	4,296
Harrison	3,210	85.87%	488	13.06%	40	1.07%	2,722	72.82%	3,738
Henry	8,069	76.69%	2,199	20.90%	253	2.40%	5,870	55.79%	10,521
Hickory	4,017	81.02%	839	16.92%	102	2.06%	3,178	64.10%	4,958
Holt	1,921	85.15%	283	12.54%	52	2.30%	1,638	72.61%	2,256
Howard	3,491	72.61%	1,201	24.98%	116	2.41%	2,290	47.63%	4,808
Howell	15,346	83.52%	2,714	14.77%	313	1.70%	12,632	68.75%	18,373
Iron	3,429	79.43%	797	18.46%	91	2.11%	2,632	60.97%	4,317
Jackson	125,136	40.45%	175,568	56.75%	8,648	2.80%	-50,432	-16.30%	309,352
Jasper	39,016	74.16%	12,325	23.43%	1,270	2.41%	26,691	50.73%	52,611
Jefferson	77,770	67.80%	34,020	29.66%	2,922	2.55%	43,750	38.14%	114,712
Johnson	16,089	69.97%	6,256	27.21%	648	2.82%	9,833	42.77%	22,993
Knox	1,373	83.16%	245	14.84%	33	2.00%	1,128	68.32%	1,651
Laclede	14,143	83.94%	2,392	14.20%	313	1.86%	11,751	69.75%	16,848
Lafayette	12,521	74.26%	3,976	23.58%	365	2.16%	8,545	50.68%	16,862
Lawrence	14,606	82.11%	2,799	15.74%	383	2.15%	11,807	66.38%	17,788
Lewis	3,469	80.51%	733	17.01%	107	2.48%	2,736	63.50%	4,309
Lincoln	23,776	76.61%	6,467	20.84%	794	2.56%	17,309	55.77%	31,037
Linn	4,312	78.43%	1,057	19.23%	129	2.35%	3,255	59.20%	5,498
Livingston	5,288	79.96%	1,213	18.34%	112	1.69%	4,075	61.62%	6,613
Macon	6,220	81.50%	1,289	16.89%	123	1.61%	4,931	64.61%	7,632
Madison	4,537	81.72%	898	16.17%	117	2.11%	3,639	65.54%	5,552
Maries	3,930	84.12%	667	14.28%	75	1.61%	3,263	69.84%	4,672
Marion	9,787	76.82%	2,662	20.89%	291	2.28%	7,125	55.93%	12,740
McDonald	7,656	83.81%	1,300	14.23%	179	1.96%	6,356	69.58%	9,135
Mercer	1,496	87.23%	197	11.49%	22	1.28%	1,299	75.74%	1,715
Miller	10,476	84.00%	1,726	13.84%	270	2.16%	8,750	70.16%	12,472
Mississippi	3,259	77.10%	883	20.89%	85	2.01%	2,376	56.21%	4,227
Moniteau	5,810	82.54%	1,083	15.39%	146	2.07%	4,727	67.15%	7,039
Monroe	3,365	80.52%	737	17.64%	77	1.84%	2,628	62.89%	4,179
Montgomery	4,722	80.80%	1,020	17.45%	102	1.75%	3,702	63.35%	5,844
Morgan	7,517	80.25%	1,638	17.49%	212	2.26%	5,879	62.76%	9,367
New Madrid	5,085	77.86%	1,325	20.29%	121	1.85%	3,760	57.57%	6,531
Newton	22,758	79.69%	5,248	18.38%	553	1.94%	17,510	61.31%	28,559
Nodaway	6,953	73.61%	2,322	24.58%	171	1.81%	4,631	49.03%	9,446
Oregon	3,686	83.70%	632	14.35%	86	1.95%	3,054	69.35%	4,404
Osage	6,553	87.04%	874	11.61%	102	1.35%	5,679	75.43%	7,529
Ozark	3,911	85.15%	599	13.04%	83	1.81%	3,312	72.11%	4,593
Pemiscot	3,750	74.93%	1,201	24.00%	54	1.08%	2,549	50.93%	5,005
Perry	7,650	82.77%	1,450	15.69%	143	1.55%	6,200	67.08%	9,243
Pettis	13,841	74.98%	4,185	22.67%	433	2.35%	9,656	52.31%	18,459
Phelps	13,484	71.53%	4,896	25.97%	471	2.50%	8,588	45.66%	18,851
Pike	6,016	79.10%	1,483	19.50%	107	1.41%	4,533	59.60%	7,606
Platte	30,095	53.03%	25,303	44.59%	1,348	2.38%	4,792	8.44%	56,746
Polk	12,722	81.78%	2,531	16.27%	303	1.95%	10,191	65.51%	15,556
Pulaski	11,278	75.09%	3,318	22.09%	423	2.82%	7,960	53.00%	15,019
Putnam	1,949	85.71%	286	12.58%	39	1.72%	1,663	73.13%	2,274
Ralls	4,455	79.80%	1,029	18.43%	99	1.77%	3,426	61.36%	5,583
Randolph	8,208	76.57%	2,262	21.10%	249	2.32%	5,946	55.47%	10,719
Ray	8,187	72.95%	2,681	23.89%	355	3.16%	5,506	49.06%	11,223
Reynolds	2,360	82.60%	437	15.30%	60	2.10%	1,923	67.31%	2,857
Ripley	4,742	85.49%	704	12.69%	101	1.82%	4,038	72.80%	5,547
Saline	6,456	71.23%	2,393	26.40%	214	2.36%	4,063	44.83%	9,063
Schuyler	1,503	82.04%	277	15.12%	52	2.84%	1,226	66.92%	1,832
Scotland	1,501	82.65%	280	15.42%	35	1.93%	1,221	67.24%	1,816
Scott	13,544	80.01%	3,106	18.35%	277	1.64%	10,438	61.66%	16,927
Shannon	3,170	82.88%	581	15.19%	74	1.93%	2,589	67.69%	3,825
Shelby	2,591	83.04%	471	15.10%	58	1.86%	2,120	67.95%	3,120
St. Charles	129,727	59.47%	83,203	38.14%	5,218	2.39%	46,524	21.33%	218,148
St. Clair	3,969	80.64%	864	17.55%	89	1.81%	3,105	63.08%	4,922
St. Francois	20,508	75.07%	6,242	22.85%	568	2.08%	14,266	52.22%	27,318
St. Louis City	20,234	17.84%	90,381	79.71%	2,774	2.45%	-70,147	-61.86%	113,389
St. Louis County	195,717	39.74%	286,847	58.25%	9,900	2.01%	-91,130	-18.50%	492,464
Ste. Genevieve	6,699	72.58%	2,350	25.46%	181	1.96%	4,349	47.12%	9,230
Stoddard	11,439	86.67%	1,542	11.68%	217	1.64%	9,897	74.99%	13,198
Stone	15,198	81.72%	3,066	16.49%	333	1.79%	12,132	65.24%	18,597
Sullivan	1,987	83.21%	362	15.16%	39	1.63%	1,625	68.05%	2,388
Taney	20,757	80.03%	4,605	17.75%	576	2.22%	16,152	62.27%	25,938
Texas	9,599	85.32%	1,415	12.58%	236	2.10%	8,184	72.75%	11,250
Vernon	6,972	79.99%	1,563	17.93%	181	2.08%	5,409	62.06%	8,716
Warren	14,553	74.88%	4,452	22.91%	430	2.21%	10,101	51.97%	19,435
Washington	7,969	81.42%	1,613	16.48%	206	2.10%	6,356	64.94%	9,788
Wayne	4,784	85.35%	721	12.86%	100	1.78%	4,063	72.49%	5,605
Webster	15,682	81.26%	3,173	16.44%	444	2.30%	12,509	64.82%	19,299
Worth	866	82.09%	166	15.73%	23	2.18%	700	66.35%	1,055
Wright	7,752	87.88%	912	10.34%	157	1.78%	6,840	77.54%	8,821
Totals	1,739,626	59.78%	1,103,482	37.92%	66,878	2.30%	636,144	21.86%	2,909,986

==== By congressional district ====
Bailey won six of eight congressional districts.

District	Bailey	Gross	Representative
1st	22%	76%	Cori Bush (118th Congress)
1st	22%	76%	Wesley Bell (119th Congress)
2nd	55%	43%	Ann Wagner
3rd	64%	33%	Blaine Luetkemeyer (118th Congress)
3rd	64%	33%	Bob Onder (119th Congress)
4th	71%	26%	Mark Alford
5th	38%	59%	Emanuel Cleaver
6th	70%	28%	Sam Graves
7th	72%	26%	Eric Burlison
8th	77%	21%	Jason Smith

== Notes ==
Partisan clients
