= Tim Jones (politician) =

American politician (born 1971)

Speaker of the Missouri House of Representatives
- In office September 12, 2012 – January 7, 2015
- Preceded by: Shane Schoeller (Acting)
- Succeeded by: John Diehl

Member of the Missouri House of Representatives from the 110th district
- In office January 2007 – January 2015
- Preceded by: Jack Jackson
- Succeeded by: Kirk Matthews

Personal details
- Born: May 25, 1971 (age 55) St. Paul, Minnesota, U.S.
- Party: Republican
- Spouse: Suzanne Jones
- Children: 2 daughters
- Education: Fordham University; St. John's University
- Website: Official website

Timothy W. Jones (born May 25, 1971) is a Republican former member of the Missouri House of Representatives, representing the 110th district, which encompasses a portion of St. Louis County. Jones served as the House Majority Leader for the 96th General Assembly and as Speaker of the House from 2012-2015. Jones is a member of the American Legislative Exchange Council (ALEC), serving as Missouri state leader.

Jones currently hosts The Tim Jones Show on KFTK-FM.

== Personal life ==
Tim Jones was born in Saint Paul, Minnesota, the son of JoAnn and Dr. William C. Jones, a U.S. Army veteran. The family moved to the Greater St. Louis area in 1972, where Tim spent his childhood. After graduating from St. Louis University High School in 1989, Jones attended Fordham University where he received his Bachelor of Arts degree in 1993 with a double major in English and Russian Studies. Jones then attended St. John's University School of Law, where he received his Juris Doctor in 1996.

When not involved with his legislative duties, Jones is employed as an attorney with the Saint Louis, Missouri based law firm of DosterUllom, LLC, where he focuses on business services and litigation, as well as civil and criminal litigation.

Jones resides in Eureka, Missouri with his wife, Suzanne, and their two daughters. They attend the Most Sacred Heart Catholic Church in Eureka, where Jones is a past president of the church's Parish Council. His first cousin Caleb Jones also serves in the House and his uncle Kenny Jones is a former State Representative and former Moniteau County Sheriff.

Additionally, Jones is a member of many local civic organizations in the West St. Louis County region including the West St. Louis County Lions Club, the Eureka Historical Society, the Eureka Library Project, the Family Enrichment Resource Program, and the Eureka and Chesterfield Chambers of Commerce; he is involved in the Rockwood School District Partners in Education and in the Missouri Bar Continuing Legal Education program, where he is a frequent lecturer and published author.

== Political career ==
In 2006, Tim Jones announced his candidacy to replace the outgoing Jack Jackson in the Missouri House of Representatives. Jones garnered 53% of the vote in a 3-way Republican primary race that August, and ran unopposed in the November general election. In 2008, Jones received the endorsement of the St. Louis Post-Dispatch as he defeated Democrat George (Boots) Weber with over 72% of the vote. Tim Jones ran unopposed again in November 2010 to win his third term in the Missouri House.

During the 2010 General Election, Jones and Speaker of the House Steve Tilley worked together with other Missouri Republicans to achieve a majority of 106 Republican House Members, the largest-ever Republican majority in the Missouri House of Representatives. The previous record was 103 during the 1929 and 1930 legislative sessions. In all, Republicans gained 17 seats in the election, defeating 10 Democratic incumbents and winning 7 seats previously held by retiring Democrats.

In November 2010, fellow Republicans unanimously elected Jones as House Majority Floor Leader. In September 2011, Jones was unanimously elected by the Missouri House Republican Caucus as "Speaker-Designate". During the 2012 veto session, Jones was sworn in as Speaker of the Missouri House of Representatives, and retained the office of speaker for the 2013 and 2014 legislative sessions.

Jones was considered a probable candidate for Missouri statewide office in either 2014 (when he is term limited in the House) or in 2016. He considered running for numerous offices in 2016, including Governor, Lieutenant Governor, Attorney General, State Treasurer, Secretary of State and the State Senate, but ultimately decided to "sit out" the 2016 elections. He will instead be "keeping all options open for 2018 and beyond" and in the interim became a senior policy fellow at Lindenwood University's John W. Hammond Institute for Free Enterprise.

=== Legislative assignments ===
In addition to his post as Speaker of the Missouri House, Rep. Jones served on the following committees:

- Ex officio member, all committees of the House
- Joint Committee on Legislative Research

2008 General Election for Missouri’s 89th District House of Representatives
Party	Candidate	Votes	%	±%
Republican	Tim Jones	14,247	72.6	Winner
Democratic	George (Boots) Weber	5,370	27.4	

2006 Primary Election for Missouri’s 89th District House of Representatives
Party	Candidate	Votes	%	±%
Republican	Tim Jones	1,408	53.0	Winner
Republican	Stephen (Steve) Banton	1,159	43.6	
Republican	Scott Dickenson	92	3.5	

Political offices
Preceded by Shane Schoeller; Acting	Speaker of the Missouri House of Representatives; 2012–2015	Succeeded by John Diehl
