= Michael Ketchmark =

- Education: University of Iowa (BA, JD)
- Occupation: Attorney
- Years active: 1990–present

Michael Scott Ketchmark is an American civil trial attorney based in Leawood, Kansas. He is the president of Ketchmark & McCreight, P.C., a law firm which specializes in personal injury cases.

== Career ==
Ketchmark represented the plaintiffs in over 275 wrongful death lawsuits seeking civil damages stemming from the criminal conviction of Robert Courtney, a former pharmacist sentenced to over 30 years in federal prison for intentionally diluting prescription drugs, including chemotherapy medication, for financial gain. A jury awarded $2.2 billion on behalf of Courtney's victims in February 2002. In 2020, when Courtney was eligible to be released 7 years early due to health concerns stemming from the COVID-19 pandemic, Ketchmark and other lawyers involved in Courtney's case called on officials to reconsider their decision, which resulted in Courtney's continued prison detention.

Ketchmark has represented clients before the Supreme Court of Missouri.

=== Burnett et al v. National Association of Realtors et al ===
Beginning in 2019, Ketchmark served as the plaintiff's lead attorney in Burnett v. National Association of Realtors, a class action lawsuit involving the sellers of over 260,000 homes in Kansas, Missouri and Illinois during the period of 2015 to 2022. The lawsuit alleged that the National Association of Realtors (NAR) had anticompetitive rules that required home sellers to pay commission to the home buyer's broker, effectively resulting in inflated commissions and artificially high mortgage rates and real property values. Specifically, the plaintiffs demonstrated that the NAR required sellers to make nonnegotiable commission offers of between 5–6% before listing homes on the property database, the Multiple Listing Service, without which seller's homes would have virtually no marketplace visibility. On October 31, 2023, after a two-week trial a federal jury found the defendants guilty and held the NAR liable for $1.78 billion in damages. Additional defendants in the case included HomeServices of America and Keller Williams Realty, among others. On the same day as the jury's verdict, Ketchmark filed a larger class action lawsuit covering all home sellers in the United States who paid commissions since 2019, and is seeking $100 billion in damages.

== Political contributions ==
Ketchmark has personally and through his firm collectively donated over $1 million to Republican and Democratic political campaigns and political action committees in Missouri.

== See also ==
- Personal injury
- Robert Courtney (fraudster)
