= FBI investigation into the 2020 United States presidential election =

During the second Trump presidency, the United States Department of Justice, including the FBI, conducted a criminal investigation into "improprieties" in the 2020 United States elections which Donald Trump lost and attempted to overturn. The investigation is part of election law and voting rights under the second Trump administration.

== Background ==
=== Efforts to overturn the 2020 United States presidential election in Georgia ===
Following the 2020 United States presidential election in Georgia, in which president Donald Trump was narrowly defeated by Joe Biden, Trump repeated false claims that his loss was caused by widespread voter fraud. Trump and his allies attempted to overturn the broader election, including by pressuring Brad Raffensperger, the Georgia secretary of state, in a phone call to "find 11,780 votes"; his call with Raffensperger served as the impetus for his indictment in Fulton County, Georgia. Trump was additionally brought up on wider federal charges for election obstruction, prior to being reelected in 2024.

According to The Atlanta Journal-Constitution, unintentional errors in the initial vote counting and recount process resulted in recorded mistakes, but did not substantially affect the results.

=== Investigations into the 2020 election in Georgia ===
In August 2024, following the appointment of Janelle King to the Georgia State Election Board, the board voted to reinvestigate the vote counting process of the 2020 presidential election in Fulton County. In July 2025, the board voted to request that the United States Department of Justice assist in its investigation of the election. Harmeet Dhillon, the assistant attorney general for the Civil Rights Division, requested many of the election-related documents from Fulton County sought by the board in October. Fulton County officials rebuked the Department of Justice, arguing that the documents had been sealed by a court order. In December, the Department filed a civil rights complaint to seek access to the County's 2020 election records. That month, the Department of Justice filed a separate lawsuit to seek sensitive information on voters; the lawsuit was dismissed by a federal judge in January 2026.

== Prelude ==
According to ProPublica, the federal government began investigating the 2020 election in Georgia using research from Kevin Moncla. As Tulsi Gabbard, the director of national intelligence, began investigating electronic voting machines amid allegations that they could be hacked, Trump appointed her to oversee the FBI investigation in Georgia. An affidavit unsealed after the raid on the election center in Fulton County revealed that the Federal Bureau of Investigation was investigating allegations of impropriety in Fulton County's handling of ballots in the 2020 election and that Kurt Olsen, a special government employee investigating the 2020 election, had initiated the investigation with a criminal referral.

== Events ==
=== Georgia raid ===
FBI investigation into the 2020 United States presidential election
- Date: January 28, 2026
- Location: Fulton County, Georgia
- Participants: Federal Bureau of Investigation; Tulsi Gabbard
- Litigation: 1:26-mc-00177

On January 28, 2026, the Federal Bureau of Investigation conducted a raid at the Fulton County, Georgia election office in Union City. The FBI had obtained a warrant from Magistrate Judge Catherine M. Salinas to seize all physical ballots, ballot images, tabulator tapes, and the voter rolls of Fulton County from the 2020 United States presidential election in Georgia.

The warrant for the search cited apparent violations of federal laws against the destruction of election-related records and against the production of fraudulent voter registrations or fraudulent votes. The prosecutor listed on the warrant was Thomas Albus, the interim U.S. attorney for the Eastern District of Missouri. The search was additionally associated with a criminal investigation. According to The New York Times, federal prosecutors consulted with Ed Martin, the chair of the Weaponization Working Group who was based in Missouri.

Tulsi Gabbard, the Director of National Intelligence, joined the raid and is running her own parallel investigation, which has prompted concerns from critics who have questioned why the intelligence chief--who has no domestic law enforcement powers--would be involved. The New York Times reported that Gabbard had called President Trump to encourage the agents conducting the raid. The Times additionally reported that Trump had ordered Gabbard to go to the election center and had coordinated her response with Andrew Bailey, the co-deputy director of the Federal Bureau of Investigation.

Speaking at the World Economic Forum one week prior to the raid, Trump said that "people will soon be prosecuted for what they did", regarding his failure to win the 2020 election. The raid was criticized by Georgia Democrats, with State Representative Saira Draper referring to it as an "attack on our democracy", and U.S. Senator Jon Ossoff calling it a "sore loser's crusade".

In May 2026, Judge J. P. Boulee denied a motion by Fulton County to return the property taken by the administration.

In July 2026, the FBI requested that its offices nationwide send around 200 personnel to assist with the investigation into the 2020 election in Fulton County, Georgia. A secret document obtained by The Associated Press said the FBI should bring in 260 experts to help with this important investigation, which needs to be done quickly. The document instructed each expert to review 708 records by July 17 to support the investigation into the 2020 election in Georgia.

=== Arizona subpoena ===
In March 2026, The New York Times reported that the Federal Bureau of Investigation had issued a grand jury subpoena for Arizona Senate Republican caucus' records of their audit of Maricopa County's 2020 presidential election results.

=== Names subpoena ===
A grand jury subpoena dated April 17, 2026, sought the names and contact information of Fulton County's governmental election workers and volunteer poll workers in the 2020 election.

== Responses ==
=== Local and statewide ===
Robb Pitts, the chair of the Fulton County Board of Commissioners, told The Atlanta Journal-Constitution that he was concerned the documents would not be secure in federal custody and asserted that the 2020 election was conducted properly.

Local officials in Fulton County sued the federal government to seek the return of the ballots. In its challenge, Fulton County argued that the seizure of the ballots was a "callous disregard" of constitutional rights.

On February 7, Northern Georgia U.S. District Court judge J. P. Boulee ordered that the docket for the lawsuit be unsealed, including both the motions filed by Fulton County and the search warrant affidavit and other documents presented to the federal magistrate judge to approve the seizure of the ballots.

=== Federal ===
Tulsi Gabbard, the Director of National Intelligence, publicly testified about the raid at the Senate Intelligence Committee on March 18, 2026. She said Trump had asked her to observe the raid. She denied handling ballots, and she said the FBI evidence truck she stood in had been "empty." Senator Mark Warner, vice chairman of the Intelligence committee, has raised concerns related to the fact that Gabbard facilitated a phone call between President Trump and FBI agents who were on the ground and executed the search warrant. Warner claimed there was no justification for her actions, saying "Let’s be clear: It is inappropriate for a sitting president to personally involve himself in a criminal investigation tied to an election he lost".
