= Catherine Hanaway =

American politician (born 1963)

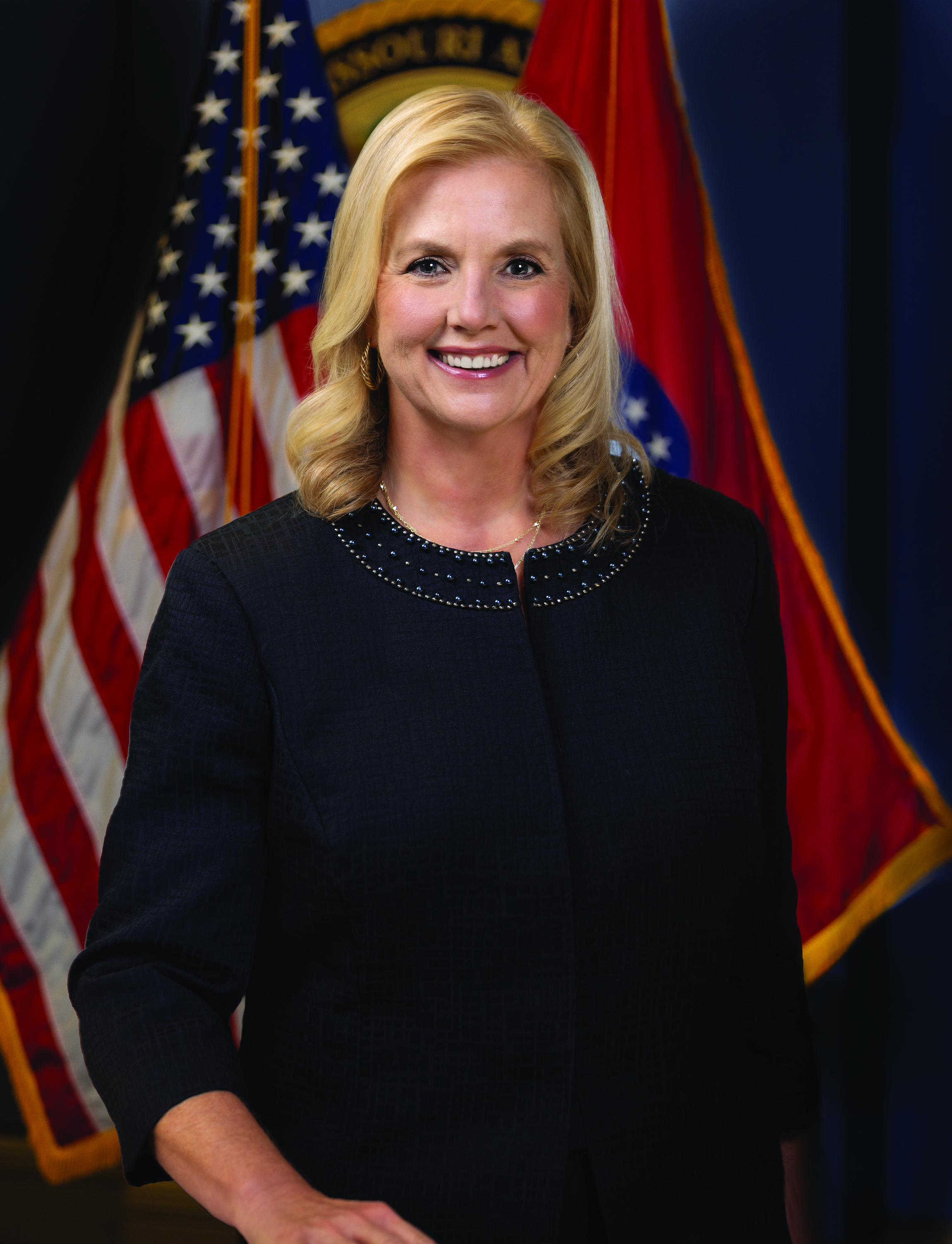
- Official portrait, 2025

45th Attorney General of Missouri
- Incumbent
- Assumed office September 8, 2025
- Governor: Mike Kehoe
- Preceded by: Andrew Bailey

United States Attorney for the Eastern District of Missouri
- In office July 19, 2005 – April 20, 2009
- President: George W. Bush; Barack Obama
- Preceded by: James Martin
- Succeeded by: Michael Reap (acting)

69th Speaker of the Missouri House of Representatives
- In office January 8, 2003 – January 2005
- Preceded by: Jim Kreider
- Succeeded by: Rod Jetton

Member of the Missouri House of Representatives from the 87th district
- In office January 1999 – January 2005
- Preceded by: Bill Hand
- Succeeded by: Scott Muschany

Personal details
- Born: November 8, 1963 (age 63) Schuyler, Nebraska, U.S.
- Party: Republican
- Spouse: Chris Hanaway
- Children: 2
- Education: University of Missouri (attended); Creighton University (BA); Catholic University (JD)

Catherine Lucille Hanaway (born November 8, 1963) is an American attorney and former federal prosecutor who has served as the Missouri Attorney General since 2025. Previously, she served as the United States Attorney for the Eastern District of Missouri from 2005 to 2009, and as the first and only female Speaker of the Missouri House of Representatives from 2003 to 2005.

== Early life and education ==
Hanaway was born in Schuyler, Nebraska on November 8, 1963. She spent the rest of her childhood growing up in rural Nebraska and Iowa. She received a marksman first class certificate from the NRA in 7th Grade and was president of her 4-H club in high school.

Hanaway attended the University of Missouri for three years before earning her Bachelor of Science degree in journalism from Creighton University, and graduated in the top 10% of her law class from the Catholic University of America. After law school, she worked in the law firm of Peper, Martin Jensen, Maichel & Hetlage, the predecessor firm to Husch Blackwell, for four years.

== Political career ==
Hanaway began volunteering for Republican campaigns in the early 1990s, and joined Senator Kit Bond's staff in 1993 where she managed his office's operations for Northeast Missouri.

Hanaway first ran for elected office in 1998 winning a seat in the Missouri House of Representatives. In 2000, she managed President George W. Bush's campaign operations for Missouri. After her first term in office, she was elected Republican Minority Leader in 2000. Throughout 2001 and 2002, Hanaway recruited candidates and raised large sums of money in a successful attempt to gain the first Republican Majority in the Missouri House in 48 years. Hanaway was elected as the first female Speaker of the Missouri House shortly afterwards. The Missouri Times described her as "Missouri's Red State Architect" who "fought on the front lines in the war for Missouri's political soul," "transforming Missouri from a national bellwether into a state that has progressively become more crimson."

=== Missouri Speaker of the House ===
During her tenure as Speaker, Hanaway successfully passed Missouri's first concealed carry law by overriding a veto from Democratic Governor Bob Holden. She also supported legislation to protect gun manufacturers from lawsuits. In addition to her pro-gun stances, she was also opposed to abortion and passed bills supported by Missouri Right-to-Life. Hanaway also rejected multiple tax increase proposals from Governor Holden as Speaker. During a 2003 budget dispute in which Holden had requested a tax increase, Hanaway publicly asked him "What part of 'No' don't you understand?"

With the 2002 death of 2-year-old Dominic James in Springfield, the need to reform Missouri's foster care system became broadly evident. Hanaway worked to pass a foster care reform bill that was named after James.

Hanaway ran for Missouri Secretary of State in 2004. She was endorsed by the National Rifle Association of America and Missouri Right to Life. In a year that Republicans carried most contested state offices, she lost to Robin Carnahan, the daughter of former Missouri governor Mel Carnahan. She was defeated in her home county of St. Louis by fourteen percentage points.

=== U.S. Attorney ===
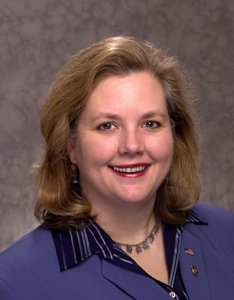
Hanaway as U.S. Attorney

After the appointment of Raymond W. Gruender to the U.S. Court of Appeals for the Eighth Circuit, Hanaway was appointed United States Attorney for the Eastern District of Missouri, taking office on July 19, 2005. As the chief federal law enforcement for half of Missouri, Hanaway prosecuted over 4,000 cases. On taking office, she made a point of visiting every local prosecuting attorney in her district, the first time in over two decades that a U.S. Attorney had done so.

One of Hanaway's focuses as U.S. Attorney was the prosecution of methamphetamine manufacturers and dealers, including illegal immigrants bringing in the drug from outside of Missouri.

Hanaway also focused on prosecuting child exploitation cases and government corruption. In a highly publicized case, she successfully sued nursing home chain Cathedral Rock Corp. for Medicaid and Medicare fraud. She also prosecuted a number of public officials, including a state representative who pleaded guilty to bribing a bank official.

=== 2016 gubernatorial race ===
On February 11, 2014, Hanaway announced that she was running for Governor of Missouri in the 2016 election. She announced her candidacy after Democratic Missouri Attorney General Chris Koster announced his, and vowed to "build the largest and best grass-roots campaign in Missouri history." She was endorsed by former U.S. Senator Kit Bond, South Carolina Governor Nikki Haley, Kansas Governor Sam Brownback, and Congresswoman Ann Wagner.

Hanaway's campaign employed Jeff Roe as a political consultant, Hanaway suspended her campaign for a month after Tom Schweich's suicide.

Hanaway was very critical of Governor Jay Nixon's response to the Ferguson unrest, feeling that he was insufficiently supportive of law enforcement. She also criticized a gubernatorial rival, state Attorney General Chris Koster, for failing to prosecute those who assaulted police officers, looted, and set fires during the unrest. Similarly, she attacked the "lawlessness" at the University of Missouri and called for the firing of Professor Melissa Click, who was caught on tape calling for "muscle" to prevent a student journalist from recording the campus protests in November 2015. Click was eventually charged with assault and fired.

On November 3, 2015, Hanaway launched a two-week statewide "Restore Conservative Values to Missouri Tour" in an RV nicknamed "Tiger One." The focus of the tour was supporting law enforcement, fighting abortion, and expanding Second Amendment rights.

Hanaway launched a second bus tour on February 25, 2016, which she called the "Safe and Strong Tour," focusing on her prosecutorial experience and rising crime rates.

In a televised debate on March 17, 2016, Hanaway criticized rival Eric Greitens for accepting a $1 million campaign contribution from venture capitalist Michael Goguen, who has been accused in a lawsuit of sexually abusing a woman who had been the victim of sex trafficking for over a decade.

Hanaway lost the Republican primary to Eric Greitens, finishing fourth with 19.95% of the popular vote.

=== Missouri Attorney General ===
On August 19, 2025, Governor Mike Kehoe announced his intention to appoint Hanaway Attorney General of Missouri after Andrew Bailey was named Co-Deputy director of the Federal Bureau of Investigation. She was sworn in as Missouri's 45th Attorney General on September 8, 2025, and is the first woman to serve in this position and the third consecutive officeholder to begin her tenure by appointment rather than by election.

On December 1, 2025, Hanaway introduced ruling promulgated under the Missouri Merchandising Practices Act requiring that “any commercial website or platform with one-third or more pornographic content must implement robust, meaningful age-verification measures” This law also includes device-specific restrictions alongside previously stated platforms and sites.

On July 22, 2026, Hanaway filed a lawsuit against Kansas City citing city programs for women and racial minority owned businesses as discriminatory toward white people and men and a violation of the 14th Amendment.

== Electoral history ==
=== State representative ===
Missouri House of Representatives Primary Election, August 4, 1998, District 87
Party	Candidate	Votes	%	±%
Republican	Catherine L. Hanaway	1,917	57.83%	
Republican	Ann Ross	990	29.86%	
Republican	James (Jim) Fiete	408	12.31%	

Missouri House of Representatives Election, November 3, 1998, District 87
Party	Candidate	Votes	%	±%
Republican	Catherine L. Hanaway	8,799	64.98%	+4.33
Democratic	John Ross	4,503	33.25%	+8.64
Libertarian	Matthew W. Peters	239	1.76%	+1.76

Missouri House of Representatives Primary Election, August 8, 2000, District 87
Party	Candidate	Votes	%	±%
Republican	Catherine L. Hanaway	3,525	83.93%	+26.10
Republican	James (Jim) Fiete	675	16.07%	+3.75

Missouri House of Representatives Election, November 7, 2000, District 87
Party	Candidate	Votes	%	±%
Republican	Catherine L. Hanaway	12,621	84.51%	+19.53
Green	Frank Eller, Jr.	1,359	9.10%	+9.10
Libertarian	John A. Wolf	955	6.39%	+4.63

Missouri House of Representatives Election, November 5, 2002, District 87
Party	Candidate	Votes	%	±%
Republican	Catherine L. Hanaway	11,578	66.89%	−17.62
Democratic	Marilyn Morton	5,732	33.11%	+33.11

=== Secretary of State ===
Missouri Secretary of State Election, November 2, 2004
Party	Candidate	Votes	%	±%
Republican	Catherine L. Hanaway	1,243,003	46.41%	−4.97
Democratic	Robin Carnahan	1,367,783	51.07%	+5.92
Libertarian	Christopher Davis	51,964	1.94%	+0.53
Constitution	Donna Ivanovich	15,576	0.58%	+0.14

=== Governor ===
Missouri Gubernatorial Primary Election, August 2, 2016
Party	Candidate	Votes	%	±%
Republican	Eric Greitens	236,481	34.56%	
Republican	John Brunner	169,620	24.79%	
Republican	Peter Kinder	141,629	20.70%	
Republican	Catherine L. Hanaway	136,521	19.95%	

== Personal life ==
After leaving office as the U.S. Attorney, Hanaway worked for The Ashcroft Group. In 2013 Missouri Lawyers Weekly reported that she had charged the highest hourly rate of any lawyer in Missouri ($793/hour in a Securities and Exchange lawsuit). She has served as a trustee at Washington University in St. Louis. She was a partner with the law firm Husch Blackwell before becoming the Attorney General. Hanaway lives in St. Louis with her husband Chris, and two children Lucy and John.

== See also ==
- List of female speakers of legislatures in the United States

Political offices
Preceded by Jim Kreider	Speaker of the Missouri House of Representatives; 2002–2005	Succeeded by Rod Jetton
Party political offices
Preceded by Matt Blunt	Republican nominee for Secretary of State of Missouri; 2004	Succeeded by Mitch Hubbard
Legal offices
Preceded by James Martin	United States Attorney for the Eastern District of Missouri; 2005–2009	Succeeded by Michael Reap; Acting
Preceded by Andrew Bailey	Attorney General of Missouri; 2025–present	Incumbent
