= Kurt Olsen =

American lawyer (born 1962)

- Born: Kurt B. Olsen; August 20, 1962 (age 64)
- Education: United States Naval Academy (BS)

Kurt B. Olsen (born August 20, 1962) is an American lawyer.

Olsen graduated from the United States Naval Academy in 1984 and was a Navy SEAL. In 2003, he founded Klafter & Olsen. Olsen's work involved defending companies in product liability cases. Following the 2020 presidential election, he became involved in litigation falsely contesting Joe Biden's victory. According to the House Select Committee to Investigate the January 6th Attack on the United States Capitol, Olsen had prepared a draft executive order to direct the Department of Justice to "take voter action" and had spoken repeatedly with Trump on January 6. He later represented the former television presenter Kari Lake in her efforts to challenge Arizona's use of electronic voting machines and to contest the results of the 2022 Arizona gubernatorial election, in which Katie Hobbs defeated Lake.

In October 2025, President Donald Trump appointed Olsen as a special government employee to investigate the results of the 2020 election.

== Early life and education (1962–1984) ==
Kurt B. Olsen was born on August 20, 1962. He graduated from the United States Naval Academy in 1984. For several years, Olsen was a Navy SEAL.

== Career ==
=== Klafter, Olsen & Lesser (2003–2021) ===
In 2003, Olsen founded Klafter & Olsen. His work involved defending companies in product liability cases. In October 2007, Maryland governor Martin O'Malley named Olsen to his Health Care Commission. In 2021, after Olsen's involvement in litigation surrounding the 2020 presidential election became apparent, the firm changed its name to Klafter Lesser and disassociated with him completely.

=== Election litigation (2021–2025) ===
After the 2020 presidential election, Olsen began involving himself with lawsuits that falsely contended Joe Biden's victory. He advised Texas attorney general Ken Paxton on his lawsuit against Pennsylvania. According to emails obtained by House Committee on Oversight and Government Reform investigators, Olsen attempted to contact Jeffrey A. Rosen, the acting U.S. attorney general, about the lawsuit. He spoke with Jeff Wall, the acting U.S. solicitor general, asserting that president Donald Trump had directed him to speak to Rosen but that he could not reach Rosen. After Rosen's chief of staff told him that Rosen was busy, Olsen drove to Washington, D.C., "in the hopes of meeting" with him. Rosen was not convinced by Olsen's arguments and challenged him on the case's merit. The lawyer William J. Olson encouraged Trump to hire Olsen.

In August 2021, the House Select Committee to Investigate the January 6th Attack on the United States Capitol sent requests to government agencies inquiring about Olsen's activities. According to a statement accompanying a subpoena sent in March 2022, the committee alleged that Olsen had prepared a draft executive order to direct the Department of Justice to "take voter action" and had spoken repeatedly with Trump on January 6. Mike Lindell, the businessman who founded My Pillow, established a network of election denialists that included Olsen. In April 2022, prior to that year's Arizona gubernatorial election, Olsen filed a lawsuit on behalf of the former television presenter Kari Lake and the politician Mark Finchem challenging Arizona's use of electronic voting machines. After Katie Hobbs defeated Lake in the election, Lake filed a lawsuit in state court to overturn the results. The 65 Project filed a complaint against Olsen in Maryland over his election litigation in August 2022 and in February 2023. The Arizona Supreme Court sanctioned Lake, the lawyer Bryan Blehm, and Olsen in May over false statements in their lawsuit. The State Bar of Arizona began investigating two charges brought against Olsen in November.

=== Special government employee (2025–2026) ===
In October 2025, The Wall Street Journal reported that Trump had requested Olsen examine the results of the 2020 presidential election as a special government employee in that past month, and that he had begun requesting information from intelligence agencies. Olsen had additionally told others he sought to remove government employees he perceived were disloyal to Trump. Speaking to Steve Bannon on War Room (2019–present) in January 2026, Ed Martin, the United States pardon attorney and the head of the Weaponization Working Group, claimed that he was working with Olsen—describing him as a White House lawyer—and "a couple of others" on election integrity, indicating that their work would cross with the Federal Bureau of Investigation's investigation into the 2020 election in Georgia. According to an affidavit released after the Federal Bureau of Investigation raided the election center in Fulton County, Georgia in January 2026, Olsen initiated the investigation with a criminal referral.

According to Politico, Olsen's work involved compiling a report summarizing an inquiry into whether Biden legitimately won the 2020 election. In investigating the election, Olsen reviewed sensitive compartmented intelligence programs and frequently contacted Trump to access information quickly. The Central Intelligence Agency publicly confirmed that it had coordinated with Olsen; since he became a special government employee, Olsen traveled several times to the headquarters of the Office of the Director of National Intelligence, the Central Intelligence Agency, and the National Security Agency, and he was in contact with the Department of Justice and the Federal Bureau of Investigation. Olsen was particularly in close contact with Andrew Bailey, the deputy director of the Federal Bureau of Investigation, and Tim Kosiba, the deputy director of the National Security Agency, and had encouraged Trump to nominate Kosiba to his position. Virginia senator Mark Warner, the vice chair of the Senate Select Committee on Intelligence, criticized Tulsi Gabbard, the director of national intelligence, for permitting Olsen's appointment. According to Reuters, Olsen sought to have the Department of Commerce declare Dominion Voting Systems's voting machines as a national security threat to ban their use, citing conspiracy theories.

=== Grand conspiracy investigation (June–September 2026) ===
In June 2026, Reuters reported that Olsen had joined the U.S. Attorney's Office for the Southern District of Florida. He was hired to work on the United States Department of Justice grand conspiracy investigation. In September, CBS News reported that Olsen had resigned.

== Works cited ==
=== Articles ===
- Banco, Erin; Landay, Jonathan; Alper, Alexandra (May 22, 2026). "Trump official tried to ban half of US voting machines, citing conspiracy theories". Reuters.
- Banco, Erin; Goudsward, Andrew (June 2, 2026). "Trump 2020 election denier Kurt Olsen joins Justice Department". Reuters.
- Barrett, Devlin; Fausset, Richard; Corasaniti, Nick (January 28, 2026). "Move to Seize Ballots Thrusts F.B.I. Into Trump's Election Conspiracy Claim". The New York Times.
- Barrett, Devlin; Corasaniti, Nick (February 10, 2026). "Georgia Ballot Inquiry Originated From Election Denier in Trump White House". The New York Times.
- Benner, Katie (June 15, 2021). "Trump Pressed Official to Wield Justice Dept. to Back Election Claims". The New York Times.
- Berzon, Alexandra; Bensinger, Ken; Homans, Charles (December 9, 2022). "Kari Lake Sues Arizona's Largest County, Seeking to Overturn Her Defeat". The New York Times.
- Broadwater, Luke (March 1, 2022). "Jan. 6 Panel Subpoenas Lawyers Who Worked to Overturn Trump's Loss". The New York Times.
- Dawsey, Josh; Collins, Eliza; Barber, C. Ryan (October 17, 2025). "White House Hires 'Stop the Steal' Lawyer to Investigate 2020 Election Claims". The Wall Street Journal.
- Haberman, Maggie; Broadwater, Luke (July 16, 2022). "Little-Known Lawyer Pitched Trump on Extreme Plans to Subvert Election". The New York Times.
- Haberman, Maggie; Swan, Jonathan; Corasaniti, Nick (October 22, 2024). "Kurt Olsen Helped Trump Fight His 2020 Defeat. Trump Is Talking to Him Again". The New York Times.
- Linskey, Annie (May 3, 2011). "Operation spotlights an elite fighting force". The Baltimore Sun.
- Lynch, Sarah; Rosen, Jacob (September 28, 2026). "Election denier Kurt Olsen has resigned from DOJ, sources say". CBS News.
- Okun, Eli (August 4, 2022). "Two arrests, an unmasking and a sentencing". Politico.
- Salganik, M. William (October 24, 2007). "O'Malley names 6 to health care panel". The Baltimore Sun.
- Sakellariadis, John (February 9, 2026). "Trump's 'Stop the Steal' lawyer probing 2020 election fraud has access to sensitive US intel". Politico.
- Sievers, Caitlin (May 4, 2023). "Supreme Court sanctions Lake in election suit". AZ Mirror.
- Sievers, Caitlin (November 16, 2023). "The State Bar of Arizona is investigating Kari Lake's election challenge attorneys". AZ Mirror.
- Timm, Jane (February 16, 2023). "Kari Lake's lawyers hit with bar complaints". NBC News.
- Woodruff Swan, Betsy; Wu, Nicholas (August 10, 2021). "Trump asked his AG about legal strategy to overturn election, Rosen tells senators". Politico.
- Wu, Nicholas; Woodruff Swan, Betsy (August 25, 2021). "Jan. 6 investigators include Trump White House in first document requests". Politico.

=== Documents ===
- "Kurt B Olsen in the U.S., Public Records Index, 1950-1993, Volume 1" (Document). Public Records Index.
