= Senator Gibbons =

Senator Gibbons may refer to:

- Michael R. Gibbons (born 1959), Missouri State Senate
- Sam Gibbons (1920–2012), Florida State Senate
