= 2008 Missouri elections =

Missouri elections, 2008
- November 4, 2008
- Turnout: 66.1%

Elections were held in Missouri on Tuesday, November 4, 2008.

== President ==
With a margin of just .13%, Missouri was the closest race in the 2008 Presidential Election.

2008 United States presidential election in Missouri
Party	Candidate	Running mate	Votes	Percentage	Electoral votes
Republican	John McCain	Sarah Palin	1,445,814	49.36%	11
Democratic	Barack Obama	Joe Biden	1,441,911	49.23%	0
Independent	Ralph Nader	Matt Gonzalez	17,813	0.61%	0
Libertarian	Bob Barr	Wayne Allyn Root	11,386	0.39%	0
Constitution	Chuck Baldwin	Darrell Castle	8,201	0.28%	0
Write-ins	Write-ins		3,906	0.13%	0
Green (write-in)	Cynthia McKinney	Rosa Clemente	80	0.00%	0
Totals			2,929,111	100.00%	11
Voter turnout (Voting age population)					66.1%

== House of Representatives ==
United States House of Representatives elections in Missouri, 2008
Party	Votes	Percentage	Seats	+/–
Democratic	1,413,016	50.08%	4	—
Republican	1,313,018	46.54%	5	—
Libertarian	82,647	2.93%	0	-
Constitution	12,747	0.45%	0	-
Independents	56	<0.01%	0	—
Totals	2,821,484	100.00%	9	—

== Governor ==
Even as Barack Obama failed to carry the state, Democratic candidate Jay Nixon won the concurrent gubernatorial election by a considerably large margin.

2008 Missouri gubernatorial election
Party	Candidate	Votes	%	±%
Democratic	Jay Nixon	1,680,611	58.4	+10.6
Republican	Kenny Hulshof	1,136,364	39.5	−11.3
Libertarian	Andrew Finkenstadt	31,850	1.1	+0.2
Constitution	Gregory Thompson	28,941	1.0	+0.6
Write-in		12	0.0	n/a
Total votes		2,877,778	100.0	n/a
Democratic gain from Republican				

== Lieutenant governor ==
2008 Missouri lieutenant gubernatorial election
Party	Candidate	Votes	%	±%
Republican	Peter Kinder (incumbent)	1,403,706	49.9	+1.0
Democratic	Sam Page	1,331,177	47.3	−1.1
Libertarian	Teddy Fleck	49,862	1.8	−0.2
Constitution	James Rensing	29,153	1.0	+0.4
Majority		72,529		
Turnout		2,813,898		
Republican hold		Swing		

== Secretary of State ==
Incumbent Secretary of State Robin Carnahan was re-elected with 61.81% of the vote, defeating Republican candidate Mitchell Hubbard.

2008 Missouri Secretary of State election
Party	Candidate	Votes	%	±%
Democratic	Robin Carnahan (incumbent)	1,749,152	61.81	+10.78
Republican	Mitchell Hubbard	1,006,088	35.55	−10.86
Libertarian	Wes Upchurch	39,296	1.39	−0.55
Constitution	Denise C. Neely	35,274	1.25	+0.67

== State Treasurer ==
2008 Missouri State Treasurer election
Party	Candidate	Votes	%	±%
Democratic	Clint Zweifel	1,394,627	50.5%	
Republican	Brad Lager	1,302,625	47.1%	
Constitution	Rodney Farthing	66,062	2.4%	
Majority		1,381,658		
Turnout		2,763,314		
Democratic gain from Republican		Swing		

== Attorney general ==
Democratic incumbent Jay Nixon was term-limited. Democratic candidate Chris Koster defeated Republican candidate Mike Gibbons 52.9% to 47.1%.

2008 Missouri State Attorney General election
Party	Candidate	Votes	%	±%
Democratic	Chris Koster	1,471,647	52.9%	
Republican	Mike Gibbons	1,312,719	47.1%	
Majority		1,392,184		
Turnout		2,784,366		
Democratic hold		Swing		
