= Robin Carnahan =

American businesswoman and politician (born 1961)

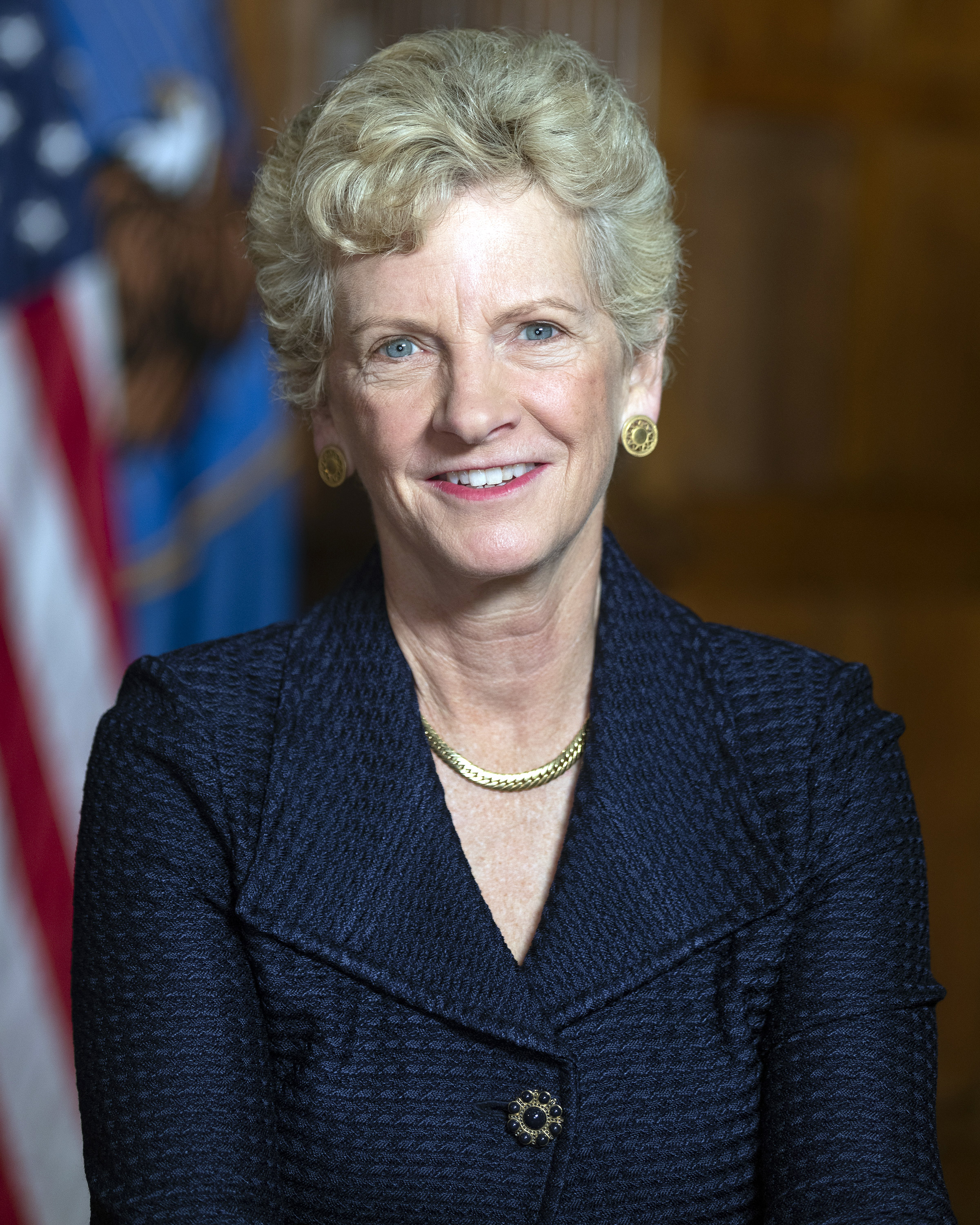
- Official portrait, 2021

Administrator of General Services
- In office July 2, 2021 – January 20, 2025
- President: Joe Biden
- Deputy: Katy Kale
- Preceded by: Emily W. Murphy
- Succeeded by: Edward Forst

38th Secretary of State of Missouri
- In office January 10, 2005 – January 14, 2013
- Governor: Matt Blunt; Jay Nixon
- Preceded by: Matt Blunt
- Succeeded by: Jason Kander

Personal details
- Born: Robin Colleen Carnahan; August 4, 1961 (age 65) Rolla, Missouri, U.S.
- Party: Democratic
- Spouse: Juan Carlos Antolinez
- Parent(s): Mel Carnahan (father); Jean Carpenter (mother)
- Relatives: Carnahan family
- Education: William Jewell College (BA); University of Virginia (JD)

Robin Colleen Carnahan (born August 4, 1961) is an American businesswoman, lawyer, and politician, who previously served as the Missouri Secretary of State and served as the Administrator of General Services in the Biden administration from 2021 to 2025. She is the daughter of Missouri politicians Mel and Jean Carnahan. In 2010, she was the Democratic nominee in the U.S. Senate election in Missouri to replace retiring Republican Senator Kit Bond but lost to Roy Blunt. She was then a senior advisor at the global strategy firm Albright Stonebridge Group. In 2013, Carnahan was named a fellow at the University of Chicago Institute of Politics. In February 2016, she joined the General Services Administration as the director of the state and local practice at 18F, a role she held until January 2020. She then became a fellow at the Beeck Center for Social Impact + Innovation at Georgetown University.

On April 6, 2021, President Joe Biden nominated her to serve as the administrator of the General Services Administration. Her nomination was confirmed by the US Senate on June 23, 2021, and she was sworn into office on July 2.

== Early life, education and career ==
Carnahan grew up near Rolla, Missouri, the only daughter in a family of four children. She attended Rolla High School and graduated, magna cum laude, from William Jewell College in Liberty, Missouri, with a Bachelor of Arts degree in economics.

Carnahan received her Juris Doctor from the University of Virginia School of Law in 1986, where she was the executive editor of the Virginia Journal of International Law.

== Career ==
=== Legal and consulting work ===
Following graduation from law school, she returned to Missouri to practice business and corporate law with the St. Louis firm of Thompson & Mitchell.

In 1990, Carnahan went to work in central Europe as part of a team from the National Democratic Institute. In this role, she helped draft voting laws, train new political leaders and monitor elections in Hungary and Czechoslovakia. Since then, she has led international election observer delegations and promoted democracy in a dozen countries and currently serves on NDI's board of directors. During the Clinton Administration, Carnahan served as special assistant to the chairman of the Export–Import Bank of the United States, working on programs to help U.S. companies increase exports of US goods and services. Later, Carnahan founded and managed an international trade and business consulting firm to advise public and privately held US companies expanding into global markets.

As of December 2005, Carnahan continued to manage her family's farm and Angus cattle operation outside of Rolla, Missouri.

=== Missouri secretary of state ===
On November 2, 2004, Carnahan was elected as Missouri's 38th secretary of state. In her first bid for elected office, she defeated then-Speaker of the Missouri House of Representatives Catherine Hanaway by over 120,000 votes. In November 2008, Carnahan was reelected with nearly 62% of the vote by receiving over 1.7 million votes, the most votes ever cast for a candidate in Missouri history. In 2005 she was named one of 24 "rising stars" in American politics by the Aspen Institute's Rodel Foundation, a leading nonpartisan think tank.

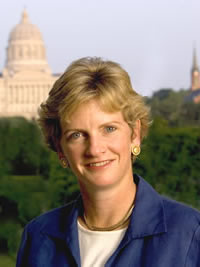
Carnahan's Missouri Secretary of State portrait, 2009

As CEO of a $50mm government agency, Carnahan emerged as a national leader in pioneering the use of innovative technology to save money and improve government service delivery for businesses and citizens. To reduce red-tape and costs for businesses, she worked closely with business leaders to identify service improvements, increase online business filings by more than 80%, streamline regulations and reduce filing fees by over $19 million. As the state's securities regulator during the 2008 financial crisis, Carnahan gained national recognition for negotiating record settlements on behalf of investors in a number of high-profile cases, including a national settlement in August 2008 in which Wachovia Securities agreed to repay over 40,000 investors who had nearly $9 billion frozen in auction-rate securities accounts.

Carnahan also worked to increase open access to public documents and data by expanding online availability of information through the Missouri State Archives and Missouri State Library.

In 2008, Carnahan worked with Missouri's local election authorities to ensure all eligible Missourians had access to the ballot box. She has been a strong advocate for early voting, paper ballots and better training for Election Day poll workers.

Carnahan served as co-chair of both the Elections and Securities Committees of the National Association of Secretaries of State. She also served on the executive committee and as Chair of the Democratic Association of Secretaries of State.

Carnahan's tenure in office focused on providing outstanding customer service to Missouri businesses, financial professionals, investors, voters, genealogists, researchers and hundreds of thousands of other customers. In the closeout audit at the end of her term in 2013, Republican State Auditor Thomas Schweich gave Carnahan's office the highest possible performance rating of "excellent".

=== 2010 U.S. Senate campaign ===
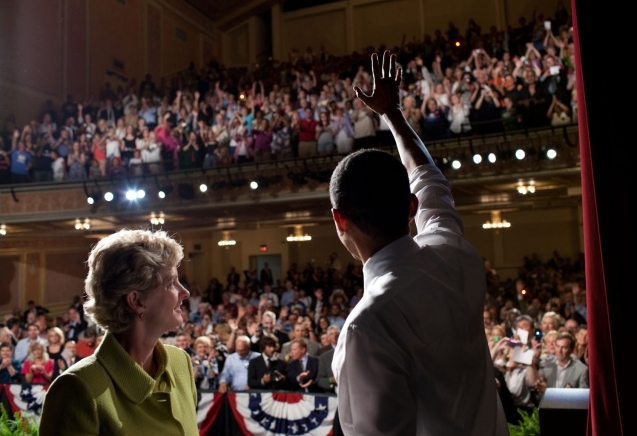
Carnahan with Barack Obama at the Folly Theater in Kansas City on July 8, 2010

On February 3, 2009, Carnahan announced she would run for the United States Senate in 2010 to replace retiring U.S. Senator Kit Bond, saying it is time to "stop the political bickering and start solving problems". She was elected the Democratic nominee in the primary election held August 3, 2010.

In October, Carnahan was endorsed by the Kansas City Star, the St. Louis Post-Dispatch, and The St. Louis American. However, Carnahan was defeated by Republican Roy Blunt as part of a Republican wave of victories in the midterm election.

=== Post-political career and public service ===
After leaving public office, Carnahan joined the global strategy firm Albright Stonebridge Group, founded by former U.S. Secretary of State Madeleine Albright. She remained in Missouri and began advising civic technology firms and organizations seeking to help government deliver better services for citizens and cut costs for taxpayers through smarter use of technology. She is a board member and serviced as a strategic adviser for LaunchCode, an organization that connects people to economic opportunity through paid apprenticeships in programming and technology. She has been regularly featured in the media and spoken before numerous national groups and congressional and legislative committees on finance, regulatory and elections issues.

In 2013 Carnahan was named a Fellow at the University of Chicago's non-partisan Institute of Politics. Carnahan also serves on the Board of Directors of the National Democratic Institute for International Affairs and on the National Advisory Committee of the Democracy Fund.

In February 2016, Carnahan joined the General Services Administration as the director of the state and local practice of 18F. There, she led a team of digital technology consultants who provide consulting and acquisition services to help state and local agencies apply the best practices of human-centered design, agile development, and modular procurement.

Carnahan often speaks about using innovation and technology to improve delivery of government services, including at Tech@State, the Code for America Summit, Personal Democracy Forum and the 2016 IT Solutions Management Conference, FedScoop named Carnahan as one of the Top Women in Tech 2017.

== Personal life ==
Carnahan comes from a family that has been active in Missouri politics for several generations. Her grandfather, A. S. J. Carnahan, was elected to the House of Representatives as a Democrat from south-central Missouri. He served only one term before being defeated in 1946, but ran again in 1948 and won. Carnahan served in the House for six more terms and in 1961 was appointed by President John F. Kennedy as the first American ambassador to Sierra Leone. Her father, Mel Carnahan, served in the state legislature, as State Treasurer, Lieutenant Governor and as Governor of Missouri from 1993 until his death in 2000 in a plane crash while campaigning for the US Senate against incumbent John Ashcroft. Her mother, Jean Carnahan, became the first woman from Missouri to serve in the United States Senate from 2001 to 2003 when she was appointed to fill the seat Gov. Carnahan won posthumously.

Her brother Russ Carnahan was a member of Congress and represented the southern portion of the St. Louis Metropolitan Area. Her brother Tom Carnahan founded Wind Capital Group. Robin Carnahan is married to Juan Carlos Antolinez.

On February 27, 2006, Carnahan announced that she had been diagnosed with breast cancer. She continued to serve as Secretary of State while undergoing treatment and her cancer is in remission.

== Electoral history ==
=== Results ===
2010 Missouri United States Senate Democratic primary election
Party	Candidate	Votes	%
Democratic	Robin Carnahan	266,349	83.9%
Democratic	Richard Charles Tolbert	33,731	10.6%
Democratic	Francis Vangeli	17,511	5.5%
Total votes		317,591	100.00%

2010 United States Senate election in Missouri
Party	Candidate	Votes	%	±%
Republican	Roy Blunt	1,054,160	54.23	−1.86
Democratic	Robin Carnahan	789,736	40.63	−2.17

2008 Missouri Secretary of State election
Party	Candidate	Votes	%	±%
Democratic	Robin Carnahan (incumbent)	1,749,152	61.81	+10.78
Republican	Mitchell Hubbard	1,006,088	35.55	−10.86
Libertarian	Wes Upchurch	39,296	1.39	−0.55
Constitution	Denise C. Neely	35,274	1.25	+0.67

2004 Missouri Secretary of State election
Party	Candidate	Votes	%	±%
Democratic	Robin Carnahan	1,367,783	51.03	
Republican	Catherine Hanaway	1,243,003	46.41	
Libertarian	Christopher Davis	51,964	1.94	
Constitution	Donna Ivanovich	15,576	0.58	

Political offices
Preceded by Matt Blunt	Secretary of State of Missouri; 2005–2013	Succeeded by Jason Kander
Party political offices
Preceded by Steve Gaw	Democratic nominee for Secretary of State of Missouri; 2004, 2008	Succeeded by Jason Kander
Preceded by Nancy Farmer	Democratic nominee for U.S. Senator from Missouri (Class 3); 2010	Succeeded by Jason Kander
