= Senator Mueller =

Senator Mueller may refer to:

- Otto Mueller (politician) (1875–1973), Wisconsin State Senate
- Walter H. Mueller (c. 1925–2011), Missouri State Senate

== See also ==
- Lauro Müller (1863–1926), Senator of the Republic in Brazil
- Filinto Müller (1900–1973), Brazilian Senator from Mato Grosso
