= 2008 Missouri Attorney General election =

- November 4, 2008
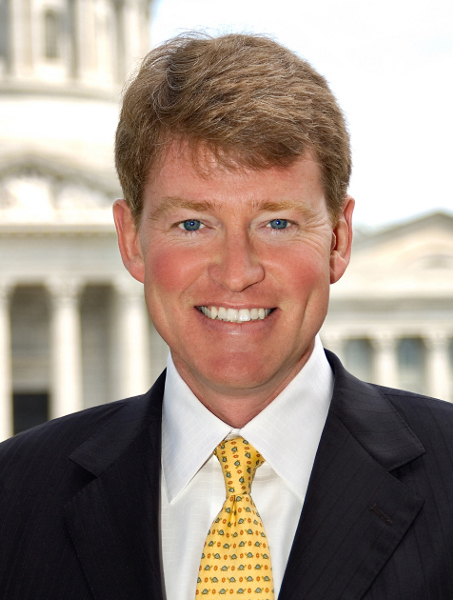

Nominee	Chris Koster	Michael R. Gibbons
Party	Democratic	Republican
Popular vote	1,471,647	1,312,719
Percentage	52.85%	47.15%
- Koster: 50–60% 60–70% 70–80% 80–90% >90% Gibbons: 50–60% 60–70% 70–80% 80–90% >90% Tie: 50% No data
Attorney General before election
Jay Nixon
Democratic
Elected Attorney General
Chris Koster
Democratic

The 2008 Missouri Attorney General election was held on November 4, 2008, in order to elect the attorney general of Missouri. Democratic nominee and incumbent member of the Missouri Senate Chris Koster defeated Republican nominee and fellow incumbent member of the Missouri Senate Michael R. Gibbons.

== General election ==
On election day, November 4, 2008, Democratic nominee Chris Koster won the election by a margin of 158,928 votes against his opponent Republican nominee Michael R. Gibbons, thereby retaining Democratic control over the office of attorney general. Koster was sworn in as the 41st attorney general of Missouri on January 12, 2009.

=== Results ===
Missouri Attorney General election, 2008
Party	Candidate	Votes	%
Democratic	Chris Koster	1,471,647	52.85
Republican	Michael R. Gibbons	1,312,719	47.15
Total votes		2,784,366	100.00
Democratic hold			

== See also ==
- 2008 Missouri gubernatorial election
