= 2016 Missouri gubernatorial election =

- November 8, 2016
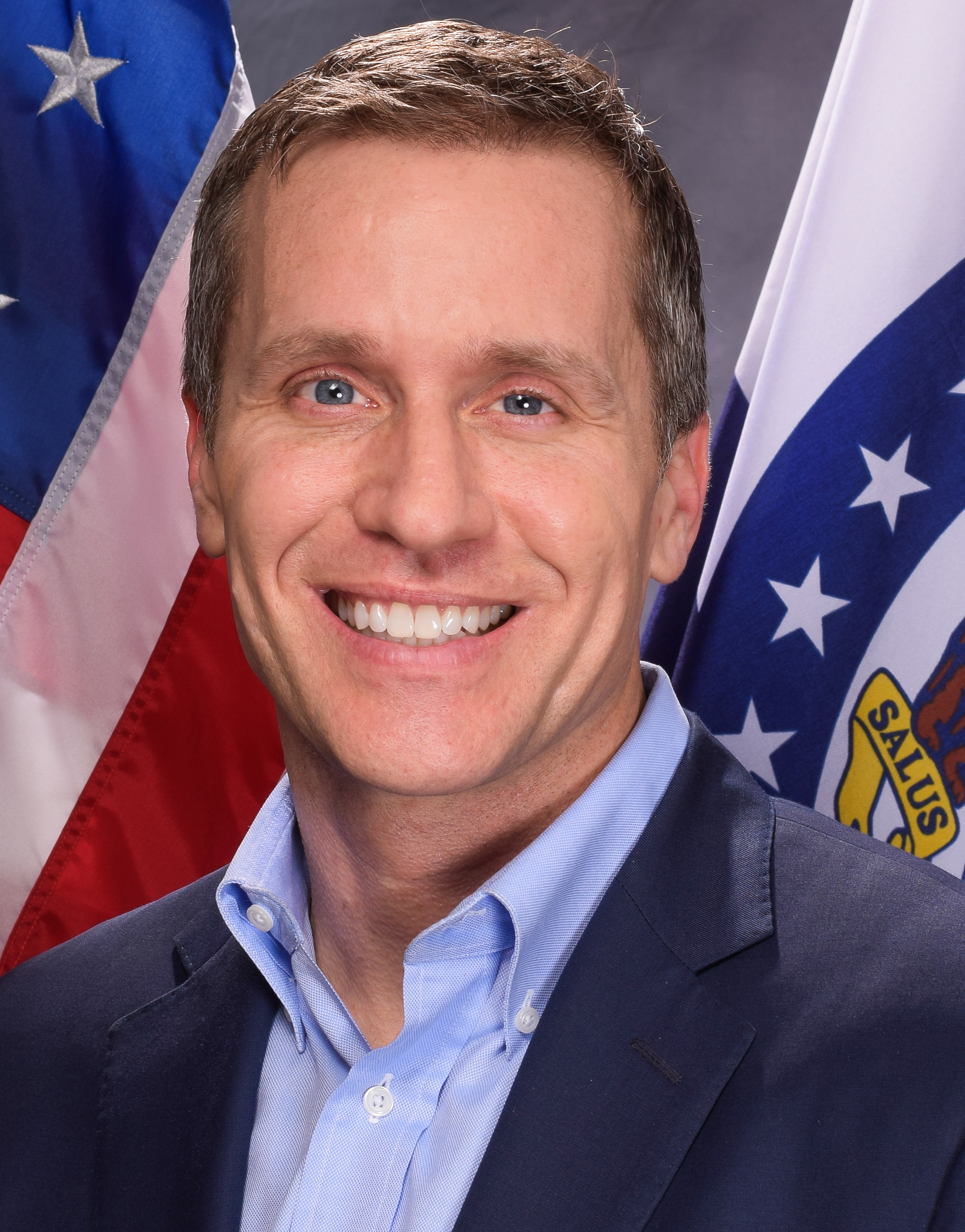

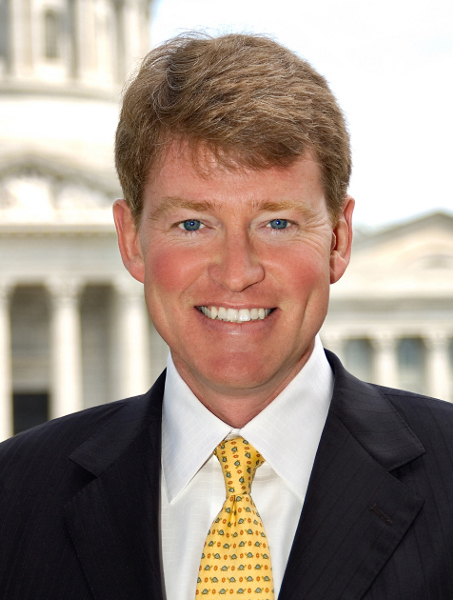
Nominee	Eric Greitens	Chris Koster
Party	Republican	Democratic
Popular vote	1,433,397	1,277,360
Percentage	51.14%	45.57%
- Greitens: 40–50% 50–60% 60–70% 70–80% 80–90% >90% Koster: 40–50% 50–60% 60–70% 70–80% 80–90% >90% Tie: 40–50% 50% No votes
Governor before election
Jay Nixon
Democratic
Elected Governor
Eric Greitens
Republican

The 2016 Missouri gubernatorial election was held on November 8, 2016, to elect the governor of Missouri, concurrently with the 2016 U.S. presidential election, as well as elections to the United States Senate, elections to the United States House of Representatives, and various state and local elections.

The primaries were held on August 2. Incumbent Democratic governor Jay Nixon was term-limited and could not run for re-election to a third term in office. State Attorney General Chris Koster and businessman, author and former U.S. Navy SEAL Eric Greitens won the Democratic and Republican primaries, respectively. On election day, November 8, 2016, the Associated Press declared Greitens the winner of the election, and Koster conceded shortly after. This was the first gubernatorial election in Missouri since 1968 in which the winner was from a different party from the presidential candidate who won the popular vote in the concurrent election (Note: While Hillary Clinton lost the election to Donald Trump, she won the popular vote.), and the first since 1940 that a Republican accomplished the feat.

== Democratic primary ==
=== Candidates ===
==== Nominee ====
- Chris Koster, Attorney General of Missouri

==== Eliminated in primary ====
- Eric Morrison, pastor, community leader
- Leonard Steinman, perennial candidate
- Charles Wheeler, former mayor of Kansas City and former state senator

==== Declined ====
- Joe Maxwell, former lieutenant governor of Missouri
- Claire McCaskill, U.S. senator, former state auditor of Missouri and nominee for governor in 2004
- Clint Zweifel, State Treasurer of Missouri

=== Endorsements ===
Chris Koster

Newspapers

- The Kansas City Star
- St. Louis Post-Dispatch

Organizations

- Missouri Farm Bureau

=== Polling ===
Poll source	Date(s) administered	Sample size	Margin of error	Chris Koster	Eric Morrison	Leonard Steinman	Charles Wheeler	Other	Undecided
St. Louis Post-Dispatch/Mason-Dixon	July 23–27, 2016	400	± 5.0%	73%	3%	1%	8%	—	15%
SurveyUSA	July 20–24, 2016	500	± 4.4%	57%	7%	3%	7%	—	26%

=== Results ===
Results by county: Koster: 50–60%; 60–70%; 70–80%; 80–90%

Democratic primary results
Party	Candidate	Votes	%
Democratic	Chris Koster	256,272	78.75%
Democratic	Eric Morrison	31,474	9.67%
Democratic	Charles Wheeler	25,756	7.92%
Democratic	Leonard Steinman	11,911	3.66%
Total votes		325,413	100.00%

== Republican primary ==
=== Candidates ===
==== Nominee ====
- Eric Greitens, businessman, author and former U.S. Navy SEAL

==== Eliminated in primary ====
- John Brunner, businessman and candidate for the U.S. Senate in 2012
- Catherine Hanaway, Missouri Attorney General appointee, former Speaker of the Missouri House of Representatives, and former United States Attorney for the Eastern District of Missouri
- Peter Kinder, lieutenant governor of Missouri

==== Deceased ====
- Tom Schweich, State Auditor of Missouri (died of suicide on February 26, 2015)

==== Withdrew ====
- Randy Asbury, former state representative
- Bob Dixon, state senator
- Mike Parson, state senator (running for lieutenant governor)

==== Declined ====
- Tim Jones, Speaker of the Missouri House of Representatives
- Bart Korman, state representative
- Blaine Luetkemeyer, U.S. representative
- Ron Richard, state senator and former speaker of the Missouri House of Representatives
- Dave Spence, businessman and nominee for governor in 2012
- Jim Talent, former U.S. senator

=== Endorsements ===
John Brunner

Indoviduals

- Mike Huckabee, former governor of Arkansas
- James E. Livingston, retired United States Marine Corps major general
- Rand Paul, U.S. senator from Kentucky

Organizations

- Gun Owners of America
Eric Greitens

Individuals

- Ben Carson, 2016 presidential candidate
- Jane Cunningham, former Missouri state senator
- Glen Klippenstein, former Missouri state representative
- John Lamping, former Missouri state senator
- Jim Lembke, former Missouri state senator
- Kirk Mathews, Missouri state representative
- Joe Maxwell, former Missouri Lieutenant Governor (Democrat)
- Robert O'Neill, Navy SEAL
- David Steelman, former Missouri House minority leader
- Sarah Steelman, former State Treasurer of Missouri
- George Herbert Walker III, former United States Ambassador to Hungary
- Nate Walker, Missouri state representative
- Bill White, Missouri state representative
Catherine Hanaway

Individuals

- Kit Bond, former U.S. senator and former governor of Missouri
- Tom Dempsey, president pro tempore of the Missouri Senate
- Nikki Haley, governor of South Carolina
- Ron Richard, majority leader of the Missouri Senate
- Ann Wagner, U.S. representative, former United States Ambassador to Luxembourg, and former chair of the Missouri Republican Party

Newspapers

- The Kansas City Star
- St. Louis Post-Dispatch
Peter Kinder
- John Danforth, former U.S. senator and former United States Ambassador to the United Nations
- Rush Limbaugh, conservative radio talk show host, long-time Cape Girardeau family friend
- Dana Loesch, conservative talk radio and television host for TheBlaze and Breitbart News, author, co-founder of the St. Louis Tea Party
- Jared Ogden, former Navy SEAL, Ultimate Survival Alaska celebrity, and Missouri resident

=== Polling ===
Poll source	Date(s) administered	Sample size	Margin of error	John Brunner	Eric Greitens	Catherine Hanaway	Peter Kinder	Undecided
St. Louis Post-Dispatch/Mason-Dixon	July 23–27, 2016	400	± 5.0%	23%	21%	21%	18%	17%
SurveyUSA	July 20–24, 2016	773	± 3.6%	21%	25%	18%	18%	18%
OnMessage Inc.	July 17–18, 2016	500	± 4.4%	23%	21%	25%	19%	12%
Public Policy Polling	July 11–12, 2016	462	± 3.2%	16%	24%	22%	15%	23%
Remington Research Group (R)/Missouri Scout	July 7–8, 2016	1,022	± 3.0%	22%	29%	16%	12%	21%

Hypothetical polling

Poll source	Date(s) administered	Sample size	Margin of error	John Brunner	Catherine Hanaway	Peter Kinder	Tom Schweich	Dave Spence	Other	Undecided
Remington Research Group	February 2–3, 2015	747	3.6%	10%	13%	—	16%	—	—	62%
Remington Research Group	February 2–3, 2015	747	3.6%	—	12%	24%	15%	—	—	48%
Remington Research Group	February 2–3, 2015	747	3.6%	—	16%	—	19%	—	18%	47%
Remington Research Group	January 2015	1,355	?	—	44%	—	56%	—	—	—
Remington Research Group	January 2015	1,355	?	—	39%	—	37%	25%	—	—

=== Results ===
Results by county: Greitens: 30–40%; 40–50%; 50–60%; Brunner: 20–30%; 30–40%; 40–50%; Kinder: 30–40%; 40–50%; 50–60%

Republican primary results
Party	Candidate	Votes	%
Republican	Eric Greitens	236,481	34.56%
Republican	John Brunner	169,620	24.79%
Republican	Peter Kinder	141,629	20.70%
Republican	Catherine Hanaway	136,521	19.95%
Total votes		684,251	100.00%

== Third party and independent candidates ==
=== Green Party ===
==== Candidates ====
===== Declared =====
- Don Fitz

=== Independent ===
==== Candidates ====
===== Declared =====
- Les Turilli Jr., businessman

=== Libertarian Party ===
==== Candidates ====
===== Declared =====
- Cisse W. Spragins, candidate for the U.S. Senate in 2010 and nominee for Missouri Secretary of State in 2012

==== Results ====
Libertarian primary results
Party	Candidate	Votes	%
Libertarian	Cisse W. Spragins	3,515	100.00%
Total votes		3,515	100.00%

== General election ==
=== Debates ===
- Complete video of debate, September 30, 2016 - C-SPAN

=== Predictions ===
Source	Ranking	As of
The Cook Political Report	Tossup	August 12, 2016
Daily Kos	Tossup	November 8, 2016
Inside Elections	Tossup	November 3, 2016
Sabato's Crystal Ball	Lean R (flip)	November 7, 2016
Real Clear Politics	Tossup	November 1, 2016
Governing	Tossup	November 4, 2016

=== Polling ===
Aggregate polls

Source of poll aggregation	Dates administered	Dates updated	Chris Koster (D)	Eric Greitens (R)	Other/Undecided (Note: Calculated by taking the difference of 100% and all other candidates combined.)	Margin
Real Clear Politics	October 28 – November 1, 2016	November 1, 2016	45.5%	46.0%	8.5%	Greitens +0.5%

View source data.

Poll source	Date(s) administered	Sample size	Margin of error	Chris Koster (D)	Eric Greitens (R)	Other	Undecided
SurveyMonkey	November 1–7, 2016	1,368	± 4.6%	48%	47%	—	5%
SurveyMonkey	October 31–Nov 6, 2016	1,119	± 4.6%	49%	46%	—	5%
SurveyMonkey	October 28–Nov 3, 2016	879	± 4.6%	49%	47%	—	4%
Public Policy Polling	November 1–2, 2016	871	± 3.4%	47%	44%	4%	6%
SurveyMonkey	October 27 – November 2, 2016	774	± 4.6%	50%	47%	—	3%
The Missouri Times/Remington Research Group (R)	October 31 – November 1, 2016	1,722	± 2.4%	45%	46%	4%	4%
DFM Research	October 27 – November 1, 2016	508	± 4.4%	45%	39%	10%	6%
SurveyMonkey	October 26 – November 1, 2016	649	± 4.6%	52%	46%	—	2%
Monmouth University	October 28–31, 2016	405	± 4.9%	46%	46%	2%	5%
SurveyMonkey	October 25–31, 2016	671	± 4.6%	54%	44%	—	2%
Missouri Scout/BK Strategies (R)	October 27–28, 2016	1,698	± 2.4%	46%	45%	—	9%
St. Louis Post-Dispatch/Mason-Dixon	October 24–26, 2016	625	± 4.0%	46%	45%	—	9%
The Missouri Times/Remington Research Group (R)	October 23–25, 2016	2,559	± 1.9%	47%	45%	4%	4%
The Missouri Times/Remington Research Group (R)	October 9–11, 2016	2,171	± 2.1%	48%	42%	5%	5%
Monmouth University	October 9–11, 2016	406	± 4.9%	46%	43%	2%	8%
The Missouri Times/Remington Research Group (R)	October 4–5, 2016	1,588	± 2.6%	44%	41%	5%	10%
The Missouri Times/Remington Research Group (R)	September 26–27, 2016	1,279	± 3.0%	51%	35%	5%	10%
The Tarrance Group (R-Greitens)	September 19–22, 2016	606	± 4.1%	45%	42%	—	13%
The Missouri Times/Remington Research Group (R)	September 19–20, 2016	1,076	± 3.2%	47%	37%	4%	13%
The Missouri Times/Gravis Marketing	September 11–13, 2016	604	± 4.0%	49%	41%	—	8%
The Missouri Times/Gravis Marketing	September 4–6, 2016	589	± 4.0%	47%	41%	3%	9%
Missouri Scout/Remington Research Group (R)	September 1–2, 2016	1,275	± 3.0%	46%	42%	—	12%
Monmouth University	August 19–22, 2016	401	± 4.9%	51%	40%	3%	6%
Remington Research Group (R)	August 5–6, 2016	1,280	± 3.0%	45%	43%	—	7%
St. Louis Post-Dispatch/Mason-Dixon	July 23–24, 2016	625	± 4.0%	52%	33%	—	15%
DFM Research	March 17–24, 2016	674	± 3.8%	41%	24%	3%	31%
Public Policy Polling	September 22–23, 2015	731	± 3.6%	37%	44%	—	20%
Public Policy Polling	August 7–9, 2015	859	± 3.3%	40%	34%	—	26%

Hypothetical polling

with John Brunner

Poll source	Date(s) administered	Sample size	Margin of error	Chris Koster (D)	John Brunner (R)	Other	Undecided
St. Louis Post-Dispatch/Mason-Dixon	July 23–24, 2016	625	± 4.0%	46%	40%	—	14%
DFM Research	March 17–24, 2016	674	± 3.8%	42%	28%	2%	28%
Public Policy Polling	August 7–9, 2015	859	± 3.3%	41%	36%	—	23%

with Catherine Hanaway

Poll source	Date(s) administered	Sample size	Margin of error	Chris Koster (D)	Catherine Hanaway (R)	Other	Undecided
St. Louis Post-Dispatch/Mason-Dixon	July 23–24, 2016	625	± 4.0%	52%	36%	—	12%
DFM Research	March 17–24, 2016	674	± 3.8%	43%	31%	3%	23%
Public Policy Polling	August 7–9, 2015	859	± 3.3%	40%	36%	—	23%
Gravius Public Polling	January 7–8, 2015	?	± 6%	29%	23%	—	48%
Wilson Perkins Allen (R-Hanaway)	January 15–19, 2014	700	± 3.7%	33%	35%	—	32%

with Peter Kinder

Poll source	Date(s) administered	Sample size	Margin of error	Chris Koster (D)	Peter Kinder (R)	Other	Undecided
St. Louis Post-Dispatch/Mason-Dixon	July 23–24, 2016	625	± 4.0%	47%	46%	—	7%
DFM Research	March 17–24, 2016	674	± 3.8%	39%	37%	2%	22%
Public Policy Polling	August 7–9, 2015	859	± 3.3%	37%	40%	—	24%

with Bob Dixon

Poll source	Date(s) administered	Sample size	Margin of error	Chris Koster (D)	Bob Dixon (R)	Other	Undecided
Public Policy Polling	August 7–9, 2015	859	± 3.3%	39%	35%	—	26%

with Bart Korman

Poll source	Date(s) administered	Sample size	Margin of error	Chris Koster (D)	Bart Korman (R)	Other	Undecided
Public Policy Polling	August 7–9, 2015	859	± 3.3%	39%	31%	—	30%

with Tom Schweich

Poll source	Date(s) administered	Sample size	Margin of error	Chris Koster (D)	Tom Schweich (R)	Other	Undecided
Gravius Public Polling	January 7–8, 2015	?	± 6%	30%	26%	—	44%

with Randy Asbury

Poll source	Date(s) administered	Sample size	Margin of error	Chris Koster (D)	Randy Asbury (R)	Other	Undecided
Public Policy Polling	August 7–9, 2015	859	± 3.3%	40%	35%	—	25%

with Claire McCaskill

Poll source	Date(s) administered	Sample size	Margin of error	Claire McCaskill (D)	Catherine Hanaway (R)	Other	Undecided
Gravius Public Polling	January 7–8, 2015	?	± 6%	19%	30%	—	51%

Poll source	Date(s) administered	Sample size	Margin of error	Claire McCaskill (D)	Tom Schweich (R)	Other	Undecided
Gravius Public Polling	January 7–8, 2015	?	± 6%	20%	34%	—	46%

=== Results ===
Missouri gubernatorial election, 2016
Party	Candidate	Votes	%	±%
Republican	Eric Greitens	1,433,397	51.14%	+8.61%
Democratic	Chris Koster	1,277,360	45.57%	−9.20%
Libertarian	Cisse Spragins	41,154	1.47%	−1.22%
Independent	Lester Benton Turilli, Jr.	30,019	1.07%	N/A
Green	Don Fitz	21,088	0.75%	N/A
Write-in		28	0.00%	0.00%
Total votes		2,803,046	100.00%	N/A
Republican gain from Democratic				

State Senate districts results

State House districts results

==== Counties that flipped from Democratic to Republican ====
- Adair (largest city: Kirksville)
- Audrain (largest city: Mexico)
- Bates (largest city: Butler)
- Buchanan (largest city: St. Joseph)
- Chariton (largest city: Salisbury)
- Clark (largest city: Kahoka)
- Clay (largest city: Liberty)
- Clinton (largest city: Cameron)
- Dunklin (largest city: Kennett)
- Franklin (largest city: Washington)
- Greene (largest city: Springfield)
- Henry (largest city: Clinton)
- Hickory (largest city: Hermitage)
- Howard (largest city: Fayette)
- Iron (largest city: Ironton)
- Jefferson (largest city: Arnold)
- Johnson (largest city: Warrensburg)
- Knox (largest city: Edina)
- Lafayette (largest city: Odessa)
- Lewis (largest city: Canton)
- Linn (largest city: Brookfield)
- Madison (largest city: Fredericktown)
- Mississippi (largest city: Charleston)
- Monroe (largest city: Monroe City)
- New Madrid (largest city: New Madrid)
- Nodaway (largest city: Maryville)
- Pemiscot (largest city: Caruthersville)
- Pettis (largest city: Sedalia)
- Pike (largest city: Bowling Green)
- Platte (largest city: Kansas City)
- Ray (largest city: Richmond)
- Reynolds (largest city: Ellington)
- Saline (largest city: Marshall)
- Scott (largest city: Sikeston)
- Shannon (largest city: Winona)
- St. Charles (largest city: O'Fallon)
- St. Francois (largest city: Farmington)
- Ste. Genevieve (largest city: Ste. Genevieve)
- Washington (largest city: Potosi)
- Wayne (largest city: Piedmont)

==== By congressional district ====
Greitens won six of eight congressional districts.

District	Koster	Greitens	Representative
1st	78%	19%	Lacy Clay
2nd	47%	51%	Ann Wagner
3rd	40%	57%	Blaine Luetkemeyer
4th	39%	57%	Vicky Hartzler
5th	60%	37%	Emanuel Cleaver
6th	40%	57%	Sam Graves
7th	32%	65%	Billy Long
8th	32%	65%	Jason Smith

== Campaign finance investigations ==
On April 28, 2017, the Missouri Ethics Commission fined Greitens' campaign $1,000 for violating state campaign ethics rules regarding campaign disclosure. Greitens did not contest the fine.

In 2018, Missouri attorney general Josh Hawley announced the opening of an investigation of Greitens' 2016 campaign financing.

On June 1, 2018, Greitens resigned from office, leaving Mike Parson, his lieutenant governor, to succeed him.
