= 2008 Missouri Secretary of State election =

- November 4, 2008
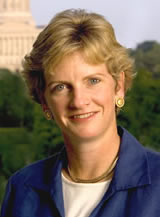

Nominee	Robin Carnahan	Mitchell Hubbard
Party	Democratic	Republican
Popular vote	1,749,152	1,006,088
Percentage	61.81%	35.55%
- County results Carnahan: 40–50% 50–60% 60–70% 70–80% 80–90% Hubbard: 40–50% 50–60% 60–70%
Secretary of State before election
Robin Carnahan
Democratic
Elected Secretary of State
Robin Carnahan
Democratic

The 2008 Missouri Secretary of State election was held on November 4, 2008, in order to elect the secretary of state of Missouri. Democratic nominee and incumbent secretary of state Robin Carnahan defeated Republican nominee Mitchell Hubbard, Libertarian nominee Wes Upchurch and Constitution nominee Denise C. Neely.

== General election ==
On election day, November 4, 2008, Democratic nominee Robin Carnahan won re-election by a margin of 743,064 votes against her foremost opponent Republican nominee Mitchell Hubbard, thereby retaining Democratic control over the office of secretary of state. Carnahan was sworn in for her second term on January 12, 2009.

=== Results ===
Missouri Secretary of State election, 2008
Party	Candidate	Votes	%
Democratic	Robin Carnahan (incumbent)	1,749,152	61.81
Republican	Mitchell Hubbard	1,006,088	35.55
Libertarian	Wes Upchurch	39,296	1.39
Constitution	Denise C. Neely	35,274	1.25
Total votes		2,829,810	100.00
Democratic hold			

== See also ==
- 2008 Missouri gubernatorial election
