= 2004 Missouri Secretary of State election =

- November 2, 2004
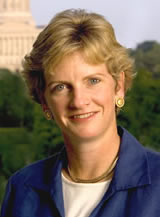

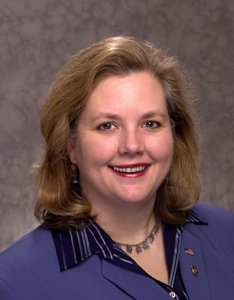
Nominee	Robin Carnahan	Catherine Hanaway
Party	Democratic	Republican
Popular vote	1,367,783	1,243,003
Percentage	51.07%	46.41%
- County results Carnahan: 40–50% 50–60% 60–70% 70–80% Hanaway: 40–50% 50–60% 60–70% 70–80%
Secretary of State before election
Matt Blunt
Republican
Elected Secretary of State
Robin Carnahan
Democratic

The 2004 Missouri Secretary of State election was held on November 2, 2004, in order to elect the secretary of state of Missouri. Democratic nominee Robin Carnahan defeated Republican nominee and incumbent speaker of the Missouri House of Representatives Catherine Hanaway, Libertarian nominee Christopher Davis and Constitution nominee Donna L. Ivanovich.

== General election ==
On election day, November 2, 2004, Democratic nominee Robin Carnahan won the election by a margin of 124,780 votes against her foremost opponent Republican nominee Catherine Hanaway, thereby gaining Democratic control over the office of secretary of state. Carnahan was sworn in as the 38th secretary of state of Missouri on January 10, 2005.

=== Results ===
Missouri Secretary of State election, 2004
Party	Candidate	Votes	%
Democratic	Robin Carnahan	1,367,783	51.07
Republican	Catherine Hanaway	1,243,003	46.41
Libertarian	Christopher Davis	51,964	1.94
Constitution	Donna L. Ivanovich	15,576	0.58
Total votes		2,678,326	100.00
Democratic gain from Republican			

== See also ==
- 2004 Missouri gubernatorial election
