= Katy Kale =

American government official

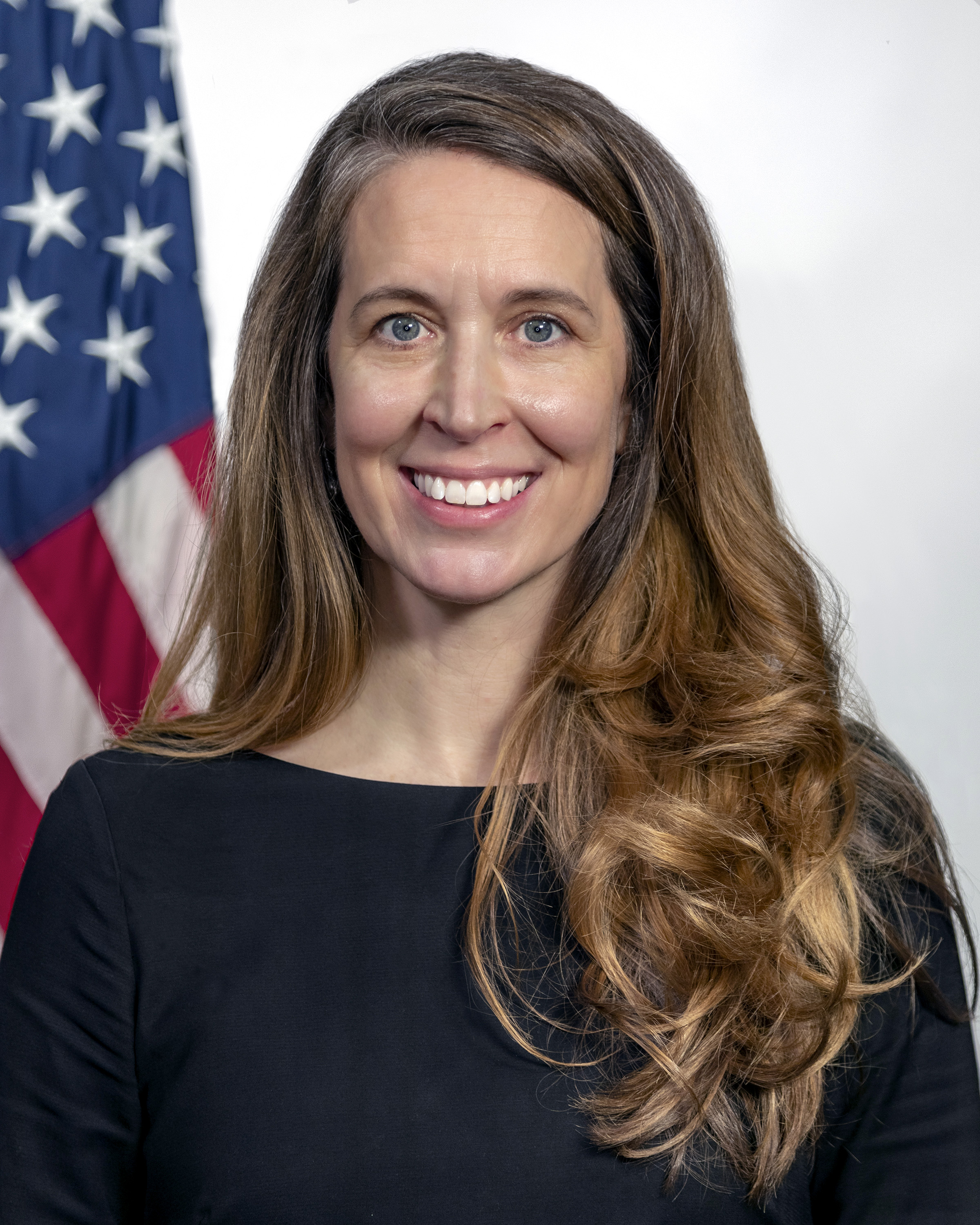

Administrator of General Services
- Acting
- In office January 20, 2021 – July 2, 2021
- President: Joe Biden
- Preceded by: Emily W. Murphy
- Succeeded by: Robin Carnahan

Personal details
- Education: George Mason University (BA)

Katy Kale is an American government official, serving as the deputy administrator at U.S. General Services Administration; she served as the acting administrator of the General Services Administration in the Biden administration prior to Robin Carnahan's nomination and Senate confirmation as administrator.

== Early life and education ==
Kale is a native of Massachusetts and earned a Bachelor of Arts degree in political science from George Mason University.

== Career ==
During the Obama administration, Kale served as chief of staff of the General Services Administration and assistant to the president for management and administration. She was also a member of the White House Council on Women and Girls. Kale was a volunteer on the Biden–Harris transition team.

Prior to joining the administration, Ms. Kale spent close to 10 years in the United States Senate working on operational and legislative issues, including time as the administrative director for both Senator Sherrod Brown and Senator Bill Nelson.
