= 2008 Indiana elections =

Indiana elections, 2008
- November 4th, 2008

Many state and local elections took place in the U.S. state of Indiana on November 4, 2008.

== Presidential ==
For the first time since 1964, the Democrats won Indiana in a presidential election. Barack Obama, a U.S. senator from the neighboring state of Illinois, won Indiana by a margin of 1.03%

== United States House of Representatives ==
The Democrats had just won a decisive victory in 2006, after picking up 3 Republican-held seats. Democrats were on to win it again.

United States House of Representatives elections in Indiana, 2008
| Party | Votes | Percentage | Seats | +/– |
|---|---|---|---|---|
| Democratic | 1,388,963 | 51.89% | 5 | - |
| Republican | 1,240,577 | 46.34% | 4 | - |
| Libertarian | 47,306 | 1.77% | 0 | - |
| Independents | 4 | <0.01% | 0 | - |
| Totals | 2,676,850 | 100.00% | 9 | - |

== Governor ==
Incumbent Mitch Daniels won re-election easily, even though Barack Obama won the state narrowly on the Presidential level.

2008 Indiana gubernatorial election
| Party | Candidate | Votes | % | ±% |
|---|---|---|---|---|
| Republican | Mitch Daniels (incumbent) | 1,563,885 | 57.8% | +4.6 |
| Democratic | Jill Long Thompson | 1,082,463 | 40.1% | −5.4 |
| Libertarian | Andy Horning | 57,376 | 2.1% | +0.8 |
| No party | Write-Ins | 27 | 0.0% | — |
| Majority | | 481,422 | | |
| Turnout | | 2,703,751 | 62% | |
| Republican hold | | Swing | | |

== Attorney General ==
Incumbent Steve Carter chose not to run for re-election, Republicans nominated Greg Zoeller, while Democrats nominated Linda Pence. Greg Zoeller won by 38,863 votes.

2008 Indiana attorney general election results
| Party | Candidate | Votes | % | ±% |
|---|---|---|---|---|
| Republican | Greg Zoeller | 1,318,147 | 50.75% | −7.43% |
| Democratic | Linda Pence | 1,279,284 | 49.25% | +9.33% |
| Total votes | | 2,597,431 | 100.00% | |
| Republican hold | | | | |

Results by county Zoeller: 50–60%; 60–70%; Pence: 50–60%; 60–70%
