= Kirk Mathews =

American politician

Member of the Missouri House of Representatives from the 110th district
- In office 2015–2019
- Succeeded by: Dottie Bailey

Personal details
- Born: c. 1957 (age 68–69)
- Party: Republican
- Spouse: Jane
- Children: 4
- Profession: businessman

Kirk Mathews (born c. 1957) is an American politician. He is a Republican former member of the Missouri House of Representatives, having served from 2015 to 2019.
