= T. Scott Muschany =

American politician

T. Scott Muschany (born April 15, 1966) was elected as a Republican in 2004 to represent the 87th District in the Missouri House of Representatives.

In August 2008, Muschany was charged with deviant sexual assault, a felony, for asking a 14-year-old girl to touch his exposed genitals. The girl was the daughter of his mistress with whom he had been having a two-year affair. At the urging of top Republican leaders, he resigned his seat and took his name off of the ballot for reelection to a third term.

In March 2009, a jury found Muschany innocent of all charges for lack of evidence.
