= Tech@State =

Tech@State was the name of a series of quarterly conferences held from 2010 to 2014 run by the U.S. Department of State that brought together individuals in the technology sector and foreign policy experts with the aim of exploring new ways of incorporating technologies into diplomacy and development.
