= Michael R. Gibbons =

American politician (born 1959)

Member of the Missouri Senate from the 15th district
- In office 2001–2009
- Preceded by: Walter H. Mueller
- Succeeded by: Eric Schmitt

Member of the Missouri House of Representatives from the 94th district
- In office 1993–2001
- Preceded by: David Klarich
- Succeeded by: Richard G. Byrd

Personal details
- Born: March 24, 1959 (age 67) Kirkwood, Missouri, U.S.
- Party: Republican
- Spouse: Elizabeth
- Profession: Attorney

Michael R. Gibbons (born 1959) is a former Republican member of the Missouri Senate, representing the 15th District from 2001 to 2009. He served as President pro tempore. Previously he was a member of the Missouri House of Representatives from 1993 through 2000. In 2008 he ran for Missouri Attorney General, losing to the Democratic nominee Chris Koster.

He is a graduate of Westminster College, Missouri and of the Saint Louis University School of Law. He has held a number of public leadership positions, including Deputy Mayor of Kirkwood, Minority Caucus Chair and Assistant Floor Leader of the Missouri House of Representatives, and Chair of the Ways and Means Committee and Majority Floor Leader in the Missouri State Senate.

He resides in Kirkwood, Missouri, and is an active Episcopalian. He married Elizabeth Weddell in 1988, and they have two children, Danny and Meredith.

Party political offices
Preceded by Chris Byrd	Republican nominee for Missouri Attorney General; 2008	Succeeded by Ed Martin
