= Ed Martin (Missouri politician) =

American politician and lawyer (born 1970)

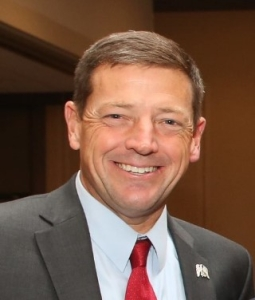
- Martin in 2025

United States Pardon Attorney
- In office May 15, 2025 – August 21, 2026
- President: Donald Trump
- Preceded by: Liz Oyer

Director of the Weaponization Working Group
- In office May 8, 2025 – February 2, 2026
- President: Donald Trump
- Preceded by: Office established
- Succeeded by: Vacant

United States Attorney for the District of Columbia
- Interim
- In office January 20, 2025 – May 14, 2025
- President: Donald Trump
- Preceded by: Matthew M. Graves
- Succeeded by: Jeanine Pirro

Chair of the Missouri Republican Party
- In office January 5, 2013 – February 21, 2015
- Preceded by: David Cole
- Succeeded by: John Hancock

Personal details
- Born: Edward Robert Martin Jr. March 19, 1970 (age 56) New York City, New York, U.S.
- Party: Republican
- Spouse: Carol Martin
- Children: 4
- Education: College of the Holy Cross (BA); Pontifical Gregorian University (BPhil); Saint Louis University (JD, MA)

Edward Robert Martin Jr. (born March 19, 1970) is an American conservative activist, politician, and lawyer who has served as the United States pardon attorney since May 2025. He previously served as interim United States attorney for the District of Columbia from January to May 2025, appointed by President Donald Trump. He was chair of the Missouri Republican Party from 2013 to 2015.

Martin has a history of incendiary claims and legal and ethical controversies. Having worked as an organizer of Stop the Steal rallies, he served as an attorney and advocate for January 6 defendants. He called claims of Russian interference in the 2016 United States elections and the results of the 2020 United States presidential election "hoaxes".

A member of the Republican Party, Martin served as chief of staff for Missouri Governor Matt Blunt from 2006 until November 2007. He was the party's nominee for Missouri's 3rd congressional district in 2010, losing to incumbent Democrat Russ Carnahan, and was the unsuccessful Republican nominee for Missouri attorney general in 2012. The president of Phyllis Schlafly Eagles, a splinter group from Eagle Forum, Martin served on the 2024 RNC Platform Committee.

In December 2024, Trump announced his intention to nominate Martin for chief of staff for the Office of Management and Budget, before appointing him instead as the interim United States attorney for the District of Columbia in January 2025. This made him the first U.S. attorney for D.C. in at least fifty years to be appointed without experience as a judge or a federal prosecutor. In May 2025, his Senate confirmation appeared unlikely to pass, after Senate Republican Thom Tillis announced his opposition, leaving Martin with too few votes to be reported out of the Judiciary Committee. On May 8, 2025, Trump announced that he would withdraw Martin's nomination, and later that day, he announced Martin was to be replaced as the interim appointee by Jeanine Pirro.

On May 13, 2025, Martin announced he would serve as pardon attorney, vowing to review the Biden administration's outgoing pardons, as well as investigate what he called "weaponization" of the justice system. That month, he was appointed to lead the Weaponization Working Group within the Department of Justice. In February 2026, The Washington Post reported that Martin had been demoted from his post as the working group's chair.

== Early life and education ==
Martin was born in New York City on March 19, 1970, the second of three children. He was raised in Whitehouse Station, New Jersey. His father was a lawyer and his mother was a nurse. He graduated from St. Peter's Preparatory School.

After high school, Martin graduated from the College of the Holy Cross with a Bachelor of Arts in English literature in 1992. As an undergraduate, he was awarded a Thomas J. Watson Fellowship to study water purification in Indonesia for a year and earned a diploma in Indonesian studies from the University of Washington while studying abroad. After graduation, he was awarded a Rotary Scholarship to study at Pontifical Gregorian University, where he earned a Bachelor of Philosophy in 1995.

After finishing postgraduate studies in Rome, Martin attended the Saint Louis University School of Law, where he earned a Juris Doctor (J.D.) in 1998 focusing on health law. As a law student, he attended Catholic Mass at the Cathedral Basilica of Saint Louis and began a friendship with cardinal Justin Rigali, who nominated him to serve as a youth representative at the Synod of the Bishops on the Americas. While working as a synod representative, he attended a Thanksgiving dinner with Pope John Paul II in 1997. In 2001, he earned a Master of Arts in healthcare ethics from Saint Louis University.

After law school, Martin worked first as director of the Human Rights Office for the Archdiocese of St. Louis.

== Legal work ==
As an attorney in private practice, Martin specialized in differing commercial and pro bono cases. Martin did legal work for the Institute for Justice, Human Action Network, Bryan Cave, LLP, Americans United for Life, Martin Simmonds, LLC, and formed his own law practice, Ed Martin Law Firm, LLC. In addition, Martin served as law clerk for the United States Court of Appeals for the Eighth Circuit under Pasco Bowman II.

In 2005 while working for Americans United for Life, Martin represented two Illinois pharmacists who sought relief from an administrative rule requiring Illinois pharmacists doing public business to dispense a certain contraceptive, levonorgestrel, also known as "Plan B" or the "morning after pill", under the state's health plan. They argued that such distribution violated their religious rights of conscience. Martin appeared on Lou Dobbs Tonight to discuss the case with Illinois Governor Rod Blagojevich. The court sided with Martin and the plaintiffs, agreeing that the Administrative Rule violated the Rights of Conscience Act; it granted the plaintiffs a permanent injunction.

In 2006 while doing pro bono work for the Institute for Justice and the Human Action Network, Martin represented a small business owner who sold caskets and funeral supplies at discounted prices. In an effort to regulate abuses in the funeral business, the State of Missouri required vendors of caskets to have a funeral director's license. Martin and other attorneys argued that the government should not prevent the businessman from selling caskets at a discount and helping people avoid inflated costs of purchasing a casket from funeral homes. Eventually, the State Board of Embalmers and Funeral Directors sided with the small business owner.

Prior to his appointment as interim attorney for the District of Columbia, Martin represented three January 6 defendants, including a member of the Proud Boys who pleaded guilty to felony charges. On January 6, he posted on social media from the Capitol area, describing the crowd as "rowdy" but "nothing out of hand". Before his appointment, Martin had been an active supporter of January 6 defendants as legal counsel. His foundation hosted a 2024 banquet at Trump's Bedminster golf club honoring Nazi sympathizer Timothy Hale-Cusanelli, a convicted Capitol riot participant, as an "extraordinary man". In April 2025, he apologized, claiming he was not aware of the full extent of Hale-Cusanelli's views.

== Political career ==
=== In Missouri ===
In 2005, Missouri Governor Matt Blunt appointed Martin as chairman of the St. Louis Board of Election Commissioners. In August 2006, Blunt appointed Martin as his chief of staff. While serving as Blunt's chief of staff, Martin was linked to the controversial firing of Scott Eckersley, then Deputy General Counsel for Blunt. In the summer of 2007, Martin's office had resisted providing his emails to an investigative reporter from the Springfield (MO) News-Leader, who was investigating whether Martin used his office to influence outside groups against political opponents. Martin claimed there were no emails that pertained to the issue. A Blunt spokesman said the administration did not have a policy of retaining emails, although the state Sunshine Law requiring retention for 3 years is widely known.

The administration claimed it had fired Eckersley because he had violated internal policies. He filed a lawsuit against Martin and Blunt for his firing, saying he had been trying to enforce the state law for retention of emails. Several major media outlets filed suit to gain access to Martin's and other emails of the administration. Martin resigned as chief of staff in November 2007, followed by Blunt's General Counsel, Henry Herschel.

After a year-long battle to gain access, in November 2008, the Kansas City Star and the St. Louis Post-Dispatch analyzed and reported on 60,000 pages of emails obtained from the administration. They found that Martin had used his state office in 2007 improperly to encourage opposition to Attorney General Jay Nixon among anti-abortion groups, as the Democrat Nixon was likely to oppose Blunt in the next election. He had also pressured political appointees of state agencies to criticize Nixon's handling of some issues as AG. In addition, the newspapers reported that Martin had encouraged outside groups to oppose the nomination of Patricia Breckenridge to an open seat on the Missouri Supreme Court, although Blunt supported her. On May 22, 2009, the Missouri Attorney General's Office announced that Eckersley's lawsuit against Blunt and others had been settled for $500,000.

In January 2008, Blunt surprised supporters by announcing he would not seek a second term. In February 2008 Governor Blunt appointed Martin as a member of the Missouri State Park Advisory Board, a position he held until April 2011.

Following Blunt's leaving office, the state completed its own investigation of possible violations of the Sunshine Law under Blunt and Martin. It found that the governor's office failed to properly disclose Mr. Martin's emails. This investigation, which cost the state $2 million, found that Martin had illegally destroyed some emails, in violation of the state's open government or Sunshine Law.

=== Advocacy projects ===
==== American Issues Project ====
In 2008, Martin founded the American Issues Project, a political group financed by Harold Simmons that ran anti-Senator Barack Obama TV ads during the 2008 United States presidential campaign. Martin appeared on The O'Reilly Factor to discuss the group's commercials.

Martin was executive director of the Missouri Club for Growth, a PAC to support certain candidates financially, and president of the Missouri Roundtable for Life, a pro-life, non-profit group. He also founded Term Limits for Missouri in 2010, which works to pass laws for term limits on all statewide elective positions in the state.

==== The Eagle Forum ====
In 2015, Martin was appointed as President of the Eagle Forum, a conservative advocacy group founded by Phyllis Schlafly, though he was removed from the position in 2016. A lawsuit was subsequently filed by a majority of the Eagle Forum's board, including the youngest daughter of Phyllis Schlafly, Anne Schlafly Cori, to bar Martin from any association with the group. During the course of the lawsuit, Martin was found liable for defamation and false light against Cori.

ProPublica in 2025 reported that after the presiding judge John Barberis issued a ruling adverse to Martin, Martin in 2016 secretly influenced Schlafly's employee Priscilla Gray to write Facebook comments criticizing the presiding judge, John Barberis, on Barberis' Facebook page. According to ProPublica, despite Martin being a lead defendant, Martin emailed Gray to: "Call what [Barberis] did unfair and rigged over and over", "Go slow and steady", and "Make it organic", as he urged Gray to write: "That is not justice but a rigged system … Shame on you and this broken legal system.".

==== Stop the Steal ====
Prior to his appointment as interim attorney for Columbia in 2025, Martin had been involved with the Stop the Steal movement. He has said that the 2020 election was "rigged" and that Trump "won the election". He spoke at a rally on January 5, 2021, where he claimed "What they're stealing is not just an election. It's our future and it's our republic." He served on the board of the Patriot Freedom Project, which raised money to support January 6 defendants and their families. He was subpoenaed by the House January 6 committee but did not testify.

Martin has been described as a conspiracy theorist by the legal news site Above the Law, which has detailed his work promoting the Stop the Steal conspiracy theory. Glenn Thrush of The New York Times described Martin as a "far-right election denier".

=== Books and television ===
In 2016, Martin co-authored The Conservative Case for Trump with Phyllis Schlafly and Brett M. Decker.

Martin was a CNN contributor in 2017. From 2016 to 2024, Martin appeared more than 150 times on RT America and Sputnik, both of which are Russian state-controlled news agencies. None of these appearances was disclosed to the Senate on a Senate Judiciary Committee questionnaire asking for a list of all media interviews. He has often appeared in far-right media. Nine days before the Russian invasion of Ukraine he said there was no evidence of military buildup on Ukraine’s borders and criticized US officials as warmongering and ignoring Russian security concerns.

=== Political campaigns ===
==== 2010 U.S. congressional election ====
In 2010, Martin challenged Democratic incumbent Russ Carnahan. Carnahan defeated Martin.

==== 2012 attorney general election ====
Martin decided to run for the U.S. Senate in 2012 against incumbent Democrat U.S. Senator Claire McCaskill. After U.S. Congressman Todd Akin and former state treasurer Sarah Steelman filed to run, Martin dropped out of the race to run from the newly redrawn Missouri's 2nd congressional district, Akin's congressional seat. On January 26, 2012, Martin announced he was dropping out of the Congressional race, and filed to run for Missouri attorney general against incumbent Democrat Chris Koster.

==== 2018 Fairfax County Board of Supervisors ====
In 2018, Martin moved to Great Falls, Virginia, where he ran unsuccessfully for the Fairfax County Board of Supervisors.

== Chair of the Missouri Republican Party ==
On January 5, 2013, Martin was elected chairman of the Missouri Republican Party, defeating incumbent chair David Cole and former Missouri State Senator Jane Cunningham. Noting that state Republican Party officials were often more conservative than most of their members, the St. Louis Post-Dispatch editorialized that Martin was an unfortunate choice for the GOP. They commented on his having cost the state "taxpayers about $2 million for an investigation spurred by his destruction of public records when he was chief of staff to Gov. Matt Blunt."

As party chairman, Martin criticized advertising in the Republican primary campaign for the 2014 United States Senate election in Mississippi, which was marked by race-based ads appearing to encourage Democrats to vote in support of candidate Thad Cochran, as well as robo-calls to African-American voters thought to be made by his opponent Chris McDaniel's campaign, which were derogatory to President Barack Obama. It was reported that Cochran and allies were "looking to increase voter turnout across the state, particularly among African Americans and Democrats who had not voted in the June 3 primary." Martin criticized Republican candidates' use of attack ads that referenced an opponent's race. "I don't know how that can be allowed in the Republican party", Martin says. "If it is, we have no credibility, we have no moral standing." In addition, Martin made a motion to censure RNC member Henry Barbour at the annual RNC August summer meeting in Chicago. This effort did not succeed, but the issue was discussed in member meetings.

== Interim US attorney for the District of Columbia ==
Martin was appointed as the interim US attorney for the District of Columbia on January 20, 2025, minutes after Donald Trump was sworn in as the forty-seventh president.

In his first weeks as interim US attorney, Martin made significant personnel changes, dismissing approximately thirty federal prosecutors who had worked on January 6 cases who were on probationary status. He eliminated the Capitol siege prosecution unit and imposed a hiring and promotions freeze. He also replaced the office's top assistant US attorney with a Republican former Senate staffer.

Martin ordered top supervisors to conduct internal reviews of the office's handling of January 6 prosecutions following President Trump's mass pardons, particularly focusing on obstruction charges that Trump had criticized. He dubbed this the "1512 Project", referring to the section of law covering obstruction charges. He also launched an inquiry involving Senate Minority Leader Chuck Schumer.

As interim US attorney, Martin initiated an internal investigation into the use of obstruction charges in January 6 cases, characterizing their application as a "great failure". He faced scrutiny for signing a motion to dismiss charges against Joseph Padilla, a January 6 defendant whom he had previously represented as defense counsel. The action drew criticism from legal experts, who noted Justice Department regulations require lawyers to recuse themselves from cases involving former clients for at least one year.

The letter sent by Martin to the Wikimedia Foundation

In February 2025, Martin publicly pledged his office's support to Elon Musk's Department of Government Efficiency (DOGE), which was charged with recommending overhauls to the federal bureaucracy. Martin posted a letter on X promising to "pursue any and all legal action against anyone who impedes your work or threatens your people". This statement came amid controversy surrounding DOGE's actions at various federal agencies, including the U.S. Agency for International Development, where DOGE representatives removed top security officials who had refused to grant them access to restricted spaces.

On February 24, 2025, Martin was criticized for referring to himself and fellow United States attorneys as "President Trump's lawyers" in a post on X. In March 2025, he was criticized for a letter telling the dean of Georgetown University’s law school, William Treanor, that he would not hire anyone who was "affiliated with a law school or university that continues to teach and utilize DEI." In March 2026, the Office of Disciplinary Counsel filed misconduct charges against Martin over the letter.

On February 28, Martin demoted prosecutors including Jason McCullough, who had been the lead prosecutor in the sedition case against Proud Boys leader Enrique Tarrio. Martin said he would not prosecute Tarrio for allegedly assaulting a woman the previous month at a protest. He further said that the police officer who arrested Tarrio should be reprimanded. "I believe he [the officer] was itching to arrest a [January] Sixer", Martin alleged. Prosecutors determined that it would be difficult to overcome a potential claim of self-defense by Tarrio, and the decision not to prosecute was consistent with other decisions in the past. On March 13, 2025, representative Jamie Raskin, the top Democrat on the House Judiciary Committee, asked the Justice Department's inspector general to launch an investigation into Martin. Raskin wrote: "In seven short weeks, the list of Mr. Martin's constitutionally, legally, and ethically indefensible actions have grown exponentially."

In April 2025, Martin sent a letter to Wikimedia Foundation. In the letter, Martin accused the Foundation of "allowing foreign actors to manipulate information and spread propaganda" and questioned its status as a 501(c)(3) nonprofit organization. It was also reported in April 2025 that Martin had sent a "vaguely threatening" letter to The New England Journal of Medicine, accusing the journal of being "partisans in various scientific debates". At least three other medical journals received similar letters from Martin.

In April 2025, an open letter criticizing Martin was signed by over one hundred former prosecutors who had worked in the Office of the US Attorney for the District of Columbia, who claimed that Martin "has butchered the position, effectively destroying it as a vehicle by which to pursue justice and turning it into a political arm of the current administration." In Missouri, the editorial board of The Kansas City Star deplored Martin as "not fit" for the job.

In May 2025, Republican Senator Thom Tillis announced his opposition to confirming Martin to the position permanently, citing in particular Martin's involvement in Stop the Steal. This left Martin with too few votes to be reported positively out of the Senate Judiciary Committee. On May 8, 2025, Trump announced that he was withdrawing Martin's nomination. Later the same day, Trump named Jeanine Pirro as Martin's replacement.

== DoJ pardon attorney ==
On May 13, 2025 Martin announced he would serve as the pardon attorney, vowing to review the Biden administration's outgoing pardons. He also announced that he would head a "Weaponization Working Group" within the United States Department of Justice, saying, "When it comes to the problem of weaponization. . . . that's what the Biden administration, they didn't tell you what they were doing they just targeted people", and "if they can be charged, we'll charge them. But if they can't be charged, we will name them . . . and in a culture that respects shame, they should be people that are ashamed." On May 22, he met with Peter Ticktin of the American Rights Alliance. Ticktin recommended full pardons for Oath Keepers leader Stewart Rhodes; for Proud Boys members Joseph Biggs, Ethan Nordean, Zachary Rehl, and Dominic Pezzola; and for Dan Wilson and Elias Costianes, former January 6 defendants who are currently in prison for unrelated charges. Separately, in a podcast episode that aired May 22, Martin said of the two men convicted of plotting in 2020 to kidnap Michigan Governor Gretchen Whitmer: "we can't leave these guys behind". On May 26, Martin described the rationale for granting pardons as "No MAGA left behind".

On August 21, 2026, Trump announced on Truth Social that Martin would step down from the Department of Justice and would "go outside to fight Legal Battles for the upcoming Midterm Election, and the Presidential Election of 2028."

== Electoral history ==
2010 Race for 3rd District Representative of Missouri
Party	Candidate	Votes	%	±%
Democratic	Russ Carnahan	99,398	48.9	
Republican	Ed Martin	94,757	46.7	
Libertarian	Steven R. Hedrick	5,772	2.8	
Constitution	Nicholas J. (Nick) Ivanovich	3,155	1.6	
Independent	Brian Wallner	3	.0	

2012 Race for Attorney General of Missouri (2012 MO SoS Election Report)
Party	Candidate	Votes	%	±%
Democratic	Chris Koster	1,482,381	55.81	+2.98
Republican	Ed Martin	1,081,510	40.71	−6.46

== Personal life ==
Martin is married to Carol R. Martin, a geriatrician-physician who works in St. Louis County and Great Falls, Virginia. He is a Catholic.

Party political offices
Preceded by Michael R. Gibbons	Republican nominee for Attorney General of Missouri; 2012	Succeeded by Josh Hawley
Preceded by David Cole	Chair of the Missouri Republican Party; 2013–2015	Succeeded by John Hancock
