= Chris Koster =

American lawyer and politician

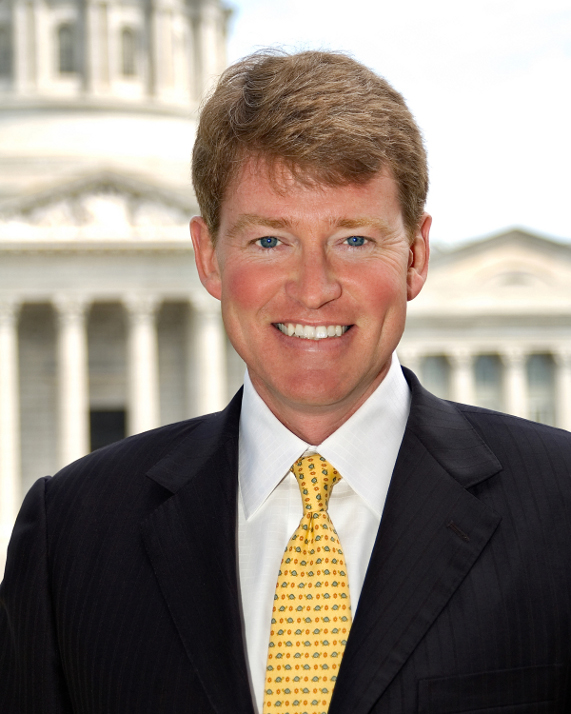

41st Attorney General of Missouri
- In office January 12, 2009 – January 9, 2017
- Governor: Jay Nixon
- Preceded by: Jay Nixon
- Succeeded by: Josh Hawley

Member of the Missouri Senate from the 31st district
- In office January 5, 2005 – January 7, 2009
- Preceded by: Harold Caskey
- Succeeded by: David Pearce

Personal details
- Born: Christopher Andrew Koster; August 31, 1964 (age 61) St. Louis, Missouri, U.S.
- Party: Republican (before 2007); Democratic (2007–present)
- Spouses: Rebecca Bowman (m. 1996; div. 2003) Jennifer Cullen (m. 2019)
- Education: University of Missouri (BA, JD); Washington University in St. Louis (MBA)

Christopher Andrew Koster (born August 31, 1964) is an American lawyer and politician who served as the 41st Attorney General of Missouri from 2009 to 2017. Before that, Koster was elected three times as prosecuting attorney of Cass County, Missouri, and served four years as state senator from Missouri's 31st Senatorial district.

In 2016, Koster was the Democratic nominee for Governor of Missouri and was defeated by Republican nominee Eric Greitens in the general election. After completing his terms as attorney general, Koster joined Centene Corporation, where he currently serves as Executive Vice President, Secretary, and General Counsel.

== Personal life ==
=== Early life and education ===
Koster was born in St. Louis, Missouri. Koster earned a liberal arts bachelor's degree from the University of Missouri - Columbia in 1987 and his Juris Doctor from the University of Missouri - Columbia School of Law in 1991. Koster also earned a master's degree in Business Administration from the Olin Business School at Washington University in St. Louis in 2002.

=== Early career ===
From 1991 to 1993, Koster served as an Assistant Attorney General for the Office of the Missouri Attorney General. From 1993 to 1994, he practiced law with the firm of Blackwell Sanders in Kansas City, Missouri.

== Political career ==
=== Cass County, Missouri Prosecuting Attorney ===
In 1994, Koster was elected Prosecuting Attorney for Cass County, Missouri, as a Republican and was re-elected in 1998 and 2002 by wide margins.

Koster supervised the Missouri investigation and prosecution of serial killer John Edward Robinson. On June 4, 2000, Koster led a group of law enforcement officers in the discovery of the remains of three female victims of Robinson's, each stored in 55-gallon drums inside a Raymore, Missouri storage facility. In conjunction with prosecutors in Kansas, John Robinson was convicted of the murders of eight women in two states, although more victims are believed to have been killed by Robinson. Robinson lured his victims over the internet, and has been called the internet's first serial killer.

=== Missouri Senate ===
Koster was elected to the Missouri Senate in 2004 as a Republican. He represented Missouri's 31st Senatorial District, which consists of Cass, Johnson, Bates and Vernon counties. During his time in the Missouri Senate, Koster played key roles in the debates over stem cell research, tort reform, and the elimination of Medicaid fraud. In 2006, he carried legislation in the Senate that overhauled Missouri's eminent domain laws.

On August 1, 2007, Koster made Missouri political history when he announced that he was leaving the Missouri Republican Party to join the Democratic party. Citing his frustration with the Republican Party's increasing intolerance on issues like stem cell research, workers' rights, cultural inclusion, and the non-partisan court plan, Koster said that the Missouri Republican Party had become too beholden to the extreme right-wing of the party. He said, "Today, Republican moderates are all but extinct."

Before his change of parties, Koster was chairman of the Republican Caucus, the majority party's fourth-ranking position in the Missouri State Senate.

While in the Senate, he served on the following Senate committees:

- Economic Development, Tourism, and Local Government
- Judiciary and Civil and Criminal Jurisprudence
- Pensions, Veterans' Affairs and General Laws
- Commerce, Energy and the Environment
- Agriculture, Conservation, Parks and Natural Resources

=== Attorney General ===
==== 2008 election ====
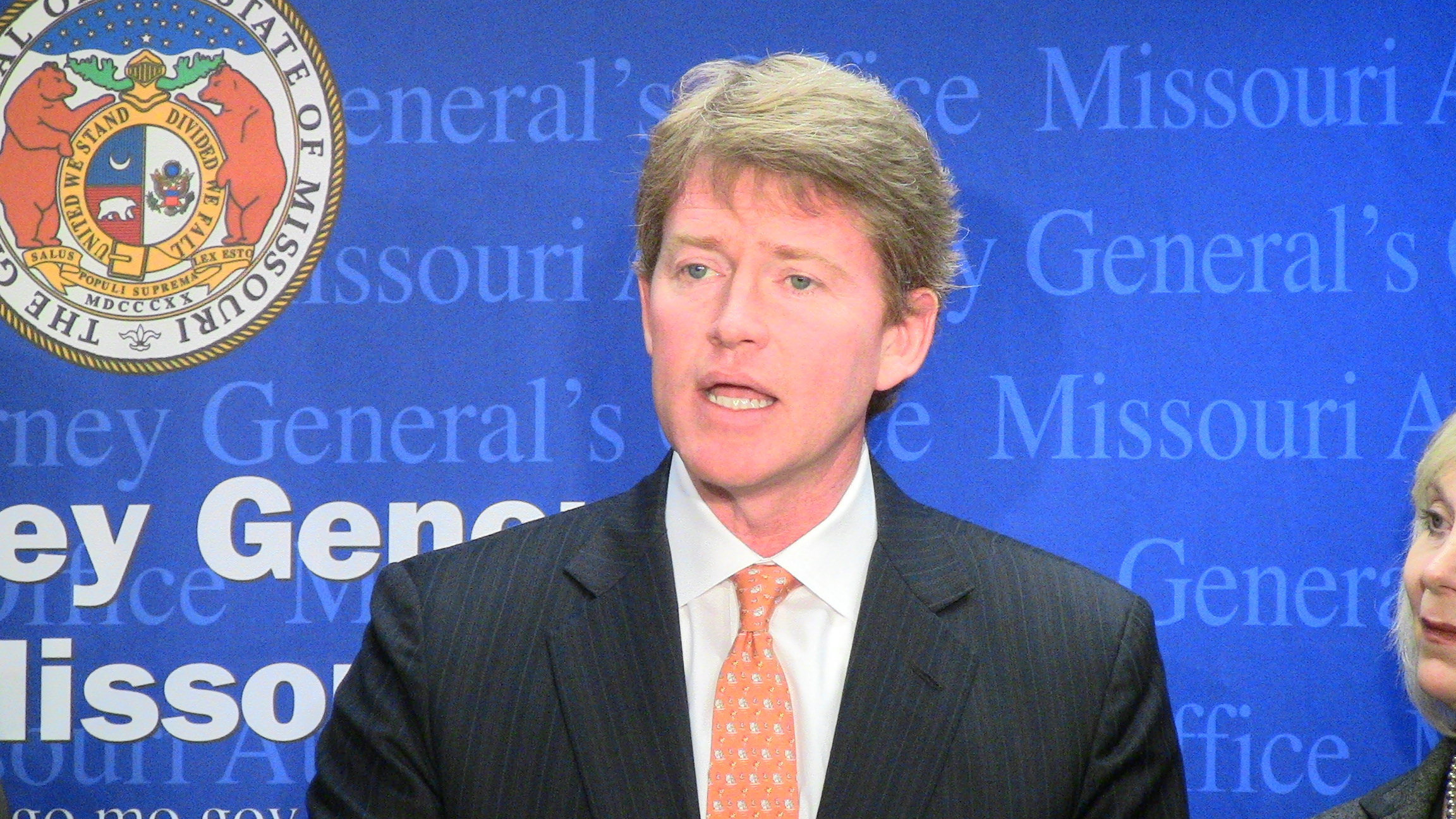
Attorney General Chris Koster speaks in 2011

In 2008, Koster defeated State Representative Margaret Donnelly and Jeff Harris in the Democratic primary for the nomination for Missouri Attorney General. Despite joining the Missouri Democratic party only a year earlier, and primary rivals calling him an opportunist for switching parties, Koster received several Democratic-leaning endorsements from law enforcement, labor unions, Democratic interest groups and elected officials. Koster won the nomination despite accusations from Donnelly and Harris that his campaign violated state law in raising money from multiple committees.

During the campaign, Koster's ex-wife Rebecca Bowman Nassikas donated $200,000 to Missourians for Honest Leadership, a political committee, which paid $187,500 to purchase air time and produce television ads in an effort to oppose Koster's candidacy for Missouri Attorney General. He went on to defeat Republican state senator Mike Gibbons in the general election, 52.83% to 47.17%. He was sworn in as attorney general on January 12, 2009, succeeding Jay Nixon.

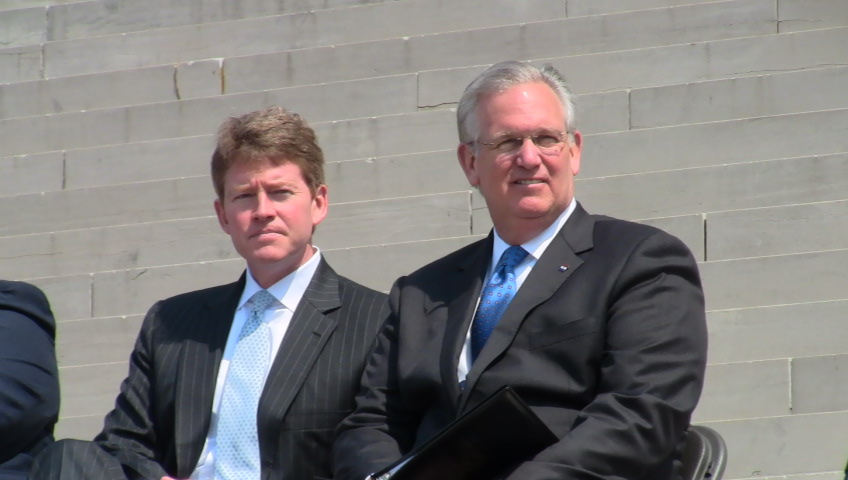
Chris Koster and Jay Nixon, 2011

==== First term, 2009–2013 ====
In 2011, Koster filed an amicus brief opposing the individual mandate in the Affordable Care Act under the Commerce Clause. He filed a second amicus brief suggesting that the individual mandate could be upheld under Congress' ability to lay and collect taxes, which is how the Supreme Court ruled on the matter in 2012.

In 2012, Koster's staff moved to the Broadway Building in Jefferson City. After this move, a request was made for "repairs, replacements and improvements" on two floors. However, Koster's office was in the Supreme Court Building. Funding for the $3.2 million request came from money recovered from consumer fraud cases. Also in 2012, a report by state auditor Tom Schweich criticized Koster for his practice of awarding contingency fee contracts to law firms that had donated to his campaign.

==== Second term, 2013–2017 ====
Koster is an advocate of the death penalty. In July 2013, there were 21 inmates on death row in Missouri whose executions he was pressing the Supreme Court of Missouri to set a date for before the drugs used for lethal injections expired. After the 21 inmates filed suit against the Missouri Department of Corrections over the use of the drug propofol for lethal injections, concerning cruel and unusual punishment, the state Supreme Court temporarily halted the further use of the death penalty until the case was decided. Missouri law allows for the use of lethal gas where lethal injection is not available. While the propofol case was before the Missouri Supreme Court, Koster argued for the use of gas chambers to execute Missouri prisoners.

During his second term, Koster's office defended U.S. District Judge Catherine D. Perry after she denied a motion for temporary restraining orders on six police officers enforcing a "5-second rule" that required demonstrators to move every five seconds or face arrest in Ferguson, Missouri, citing the need for law enforcement's protection of property and the availability of a designated protest area. However, at the time of this ruling, the designated protest area was off-limits to the public. This "5-second rule" was later determined to be unconstitutional by a different federal judge.

In February 2014, Koster filed a suit on behalf of six states challenging California's prohibition on the sale of eggs laid by caged hens kept in conditions more restrictive than those approved by California voters in a 2008 ballot initiative, Proposition 2. In October 2014, Judge Kimberly Mueller dismissed the suit, ruling that the states lacked legal standing to sue on behalf of their residents and that Koster and other plaintiffs were representing only the interests of egg farmers, rather than "a substantial statement of their populations".

Also in October 2014, House Speaker Tim Jones announced plans to investigate charges that Koster took actions in office that were designed to benefit campaign contributors. Some of the actions investigated included: the Simmons Firm donating $100,000 to Koster's campaign in 2012 and both parties suing Republic Services in 2013; Koster ending an inquiry focusing on 5-hour Energy after conversations with a lobbyist for the company who was also a Koster contributor; Koster had negotiating an agreement with Pfizer, another campaign contributor, to pay Missouri $750,000 in connection with a multi-state investigation of illegal marketing practices, about $350,000 less than what the state would have collected had it participated in a joint negotiation with other states.

In Missouri, it is legal for elected officials to accept unlimited campaign contributions and gifts from lobbyists. Despite his position on lobbying reform, Koster rejects the idea of placing limits on the amount of money a corporation or a rich person could contribute to a campaign. He instead suggests adding more transparency to the existing system. In December 2014, Koster said that he would no longer accept gifts from lobbyists.

During his second term as attorney general, Koster said that he supports same-sex marriage, but defended his state's former constitutional ban on it because voters approved it.

=== 2016 gubernatorial election ===
In February 2016, Koster filed to run for governor of Missouri. He won the August 2 Democratic primary, but lost the general election to Republican Eric Greitens.

== 2017–present ==
In February 2017, Koster was named Senior Vice President of Corporate Services at Centene Corp. In February 2020, Koster took the position of EVP, Secretary and General Counsel at Centene.

== Electoral history ==
=== 2016 Gubernatorial race ===
2016 Missouri gubernatorial election ()
Party	Candidate	Votes	%	±%
Democratic	Chris Koster	1,261,110	45.4	
Republican	Eric Greitens	1,424,730	51.3	
Libertarian	Dave Browning	92,819	3.48	

=== As Attorney General ===
2012 Race for Attorney General of Missouri (2012 MO SoS Election Report)
Party	Candidate	Votes	%	±%
Democratic	Chris Koster (incumbent)	1,491,139	55.81	+2.96
Republican	Ed Martin	1,084,106	40.63	−6.52
Libertarian	Dave Browning	92,819	3.48	

2008 Race for Attorney General of Missouri
Party	Candidate	Votes	%	±%
Democratic	Chris Koster	1,471,647	52.83	
Republican	Mike Gibbons	1,312,719	47.17	

2008 Democratic primary for Attorney General of Missouri
Party	Candidate	Votes	%	±
Democratic	Chris Koster	118,934	34.3	
Democratic	Margaret Donnelly	118,105	34.1	
Democratic	Jeff Harris	86,550	25.0	
Democratic	Molly Williams	23,140	6.7	

=== As state senator ===
2004 Race for Missouri State Senate 31st District
Party	Candidate	Votes	%	±
Republican	Chris Koster	50,328	62.9	
Democratic	Larry Snider	28,565	35.7	
Libertarian	Len Ludlam	1,086	1.4	

== Sources ==
- Official Manual, State of Missouri, 2005-2006. Jefferson City, MO: Secretary of State.

Legal offices
Preceded by Jay Nixon	Attorney General of Missouri; 2009–2017	Succeeded by Josh Hawley
Party political offices
Preceded by Jay Nixon	Democratic nominee for Missouri Attorney General; 2008, 2012	Succeeded by Teresa Hensley
Preceded by Jay Nixon	Democratic nominee for Governor of Missouri; 2016	Succeeded by Nicole Galloway
