= Walter H. Mueller =

American politician

Walter H. Mueller Jr. (c. 1925 – February 8, 2011) was an American politician who served in the Missouri Senate from 1991 until 2000 and the Missouri House of Representatives from 1973 until 1990. He was elected to the Missouri Senate by winning a special election in 1990. He was a member of the Republican Party.

Born in Springfield, Illinois, he moved to Wichita, Kansas, when he was young, where he attended Wichita High School East, Wichita State University, and the University of Kansas where he graduated with a bachelor's of science degree in marketing and business administration. He previously served in the U.S. Air Force.

Mueller had worked as a real estate agent and appraiser. He tried unsuccessfully to get the legislature to pursue a constitutional amendment for a site value tax, which would have based property taxes on the value of the land, not the buildings, feeling that it was unfair to penalize people for developing their land.
