= Weaponization Working Group =

US Department of Justice working group

- Founded: February 5, 2025; 19 months ago
- Director: Vacant

February 5, 2025 memorandum

The Weaponization Working Group is a working group of the Office of the Attorney General within the United States Department of Justice created in 2025. The working group has received criticism for itself being weaponized as part of a broad use of federal powers against the political opponents of Donald Trump; and for the appointment, actions, and strategy of its director Ed Martin.

== History ==
On February 5, 2025, hours after being sworn in as attorney general, Pam Bondi signed a memorandum establishing the Weaponization Working Group to review politicized prosecutions. The working group involved the U.S. Attorney's Office for the District of Columbia, then led on an acting basis by Ed Martin, who praised the January 6 Capitol attack and repeated false claims of fraud in the 2020 presidential election.

In May 2025, amid pressure from Republicans in the Senate to withdraw Martin's nomination for United States Attorney for the District of Columbia, President Donald Trump announced that Martin would serve as director of the Weaponization Working Group. Martin outlined a strategy to shame individuals who cannot be charged with crimes at a press conference days later. Martin received criticism for breaking Justice Department protocol in his pursuit of Trump's enemies as part of the working group, which legal experts described as being "so outside the bounds that it could undermine any criminal case".

Martin notably accused Fed governor Lisa Cook on social media of being a "crook" and posted an article accusing her of fraud despite there being no formal allegations of wrongdoing at the time. On August 12, Martin wrote a letter to Cook saying it would be seen as "good faith" if she were to resign, later appeared posing for pictures in front of her house in a trench coat for the New York Post, and then went on Fox News to discuss his actions as a prosecutor regarding his allegations against Cook. The New York Times described Martin's actions as having "stoked the base, leading them to believe that the president's perceived enemies, including Ms. James, former President Barack Obama, the former F.B.I. director James B. Comey and the former C.I.A. director John O. Brennan, will soon be punished".

== Organization ==
The Weaponization Working Group was initially led by Ed Martin. In July, The New York Times reported that Jared Wise, a former Federal Bureau of Investigation agent who was charged with encouraging January 6 Capitol attack rioters to "kill cops", had become a counselor to Martin. In February 2026, The Washington Post reported that Martin had been demoted as the working group's chair. Wise would resign in April 2026 stating that the goals of the group "will only happen from outside of government."

== Responsibilities ==
=== Prosecutions against Trump ===
Pam Bondi's memorandum tasked the Weaponization Working Group with reviewing prosecutions against Donald Trump prior to his second inauguration, including the Smith special counsel investigation, his prosecution in New York, and the New York business fraud lawsuit against the Trump Organization.

=== Other prosecutions ===
Bondi's memorandum ordered the working group to review potential "prosecutorial abuse" relating to criminal proceedings in the January 6 Capitol attack, anti-abortion protesters who obstructed access to facilities that perform abortions, and the Federal Bureau of Investigation's alleged targeting of Catholics. According to NBC News, Bondi ordered charges against Michael Kirk Moore, a Utah doctor indicted for allegedly selling fraudulent COVID-19 vaccine cards, to be dismissed after his prosecution was reviewed by the Weaponization Working Group.

== Prosecutions, investigations, and threats ==
Federal criminal indictments have been issued against:

- James Comey
- Letitia James
- John Bolton (investigation began under the first Trump Administration and continued under the Biden Administration)

Adam Schiff was reportedly under federal investigation, with Attorney General Pam Bondi demanding he apologize for serving as an impeachment manager in the first impeachment of Donald Trump.

Prosecutions were threatened against former CIA Director John O. Brennan and former Director of National Intelligence James Clapper.

== Responses ==
The establishment of the Weaponization Working Group marked a dramatic effort to utilize the United States federal government against perceived enemies of Donald Trump. Donald Voiret, the special agent who led the Federal Bureau of Investigation's Seattle field office and served as the bureau's attaché to London, criticized the working group as an attempt to politicize the Department of Justice and the Federal Bureau of Investigation.
