= 2000 Missouri Secretary of State election =

- November 7, 2000
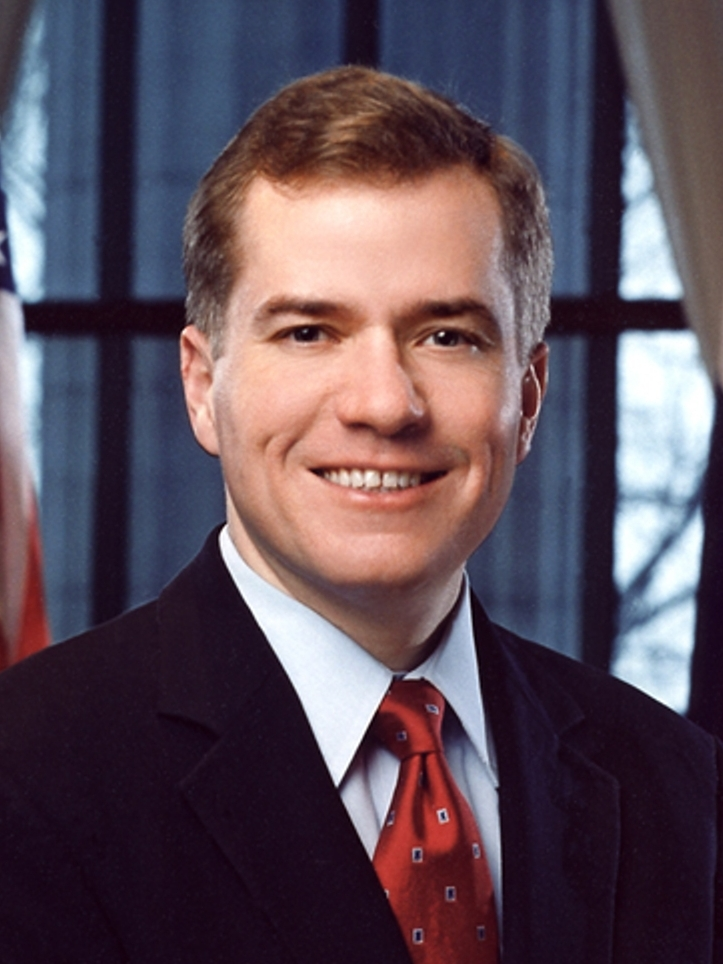

Nominee	Matt Blunt	Steve Gaw
Party	Republican	Democratic
Popular vote	1,180,236	1,037,064
Percentage	51.38%	45.15%
- County results Blunt: 40–50% 50–60% 60–70% 70–80% 80–90% Gaw: 40–50% 50–60% 60–70% 70–80%
Secretary of State before election
Bekki Cook
Democratic
Elected Secretary of State
Matt Blunt
Republican

The 2000 Missouri Secretary of State election was held on November 7, 2000, in order to elect the secretary of state of Missouri. Republican nominee and incumbent member of the Missouri House of Representatives Matt Blunt defeated Democratic nominee and incumbent speaker of the Missouri House of Representatives Steve Gaw, Libertarian nominee Jane Spence Southard, Green nominee Paula Elias, Constitution nominee Donna L. Ivanovich, Reform nominee Marvalene Pankey and Natural Law nominee Lois Benge.

== General election ==
On election day, November 7, 2000, Republican nominee Matt Blunt won the election by a margin of 143,172 votes against his foremost opponent Democratic nominee Steve Gaw, thereby gaining Republican control over the office of secretary of state. Blunt was sworn in as the 37th secretary of state of Missouri on January 3, 2001.

=== Results ===
Missouri Secretary of State election, 2000
Party	Candidate	Votes	%
Republican	Matt Blunt	1,180,236	51.38
Democratic	Steve Gaw	1,037,064	45.15
Libertarian	Jane Spence Southard	32,354	1.41
Green	Paula Elias	25,391	1.11
Constitution	Donna L. Ivanovich	10,010	0.44
Reform	Marvalene Pankey	7,101	0.31
Natural Law	Lois Benge	5,002	0.20
Total votes		2,297,158	100.00
Republican gain from Democratic			

== See also ==
- 2000 Missouri gubernatorial election
