= 1996 Missouri Secretary of State election =

- November 5, 1996
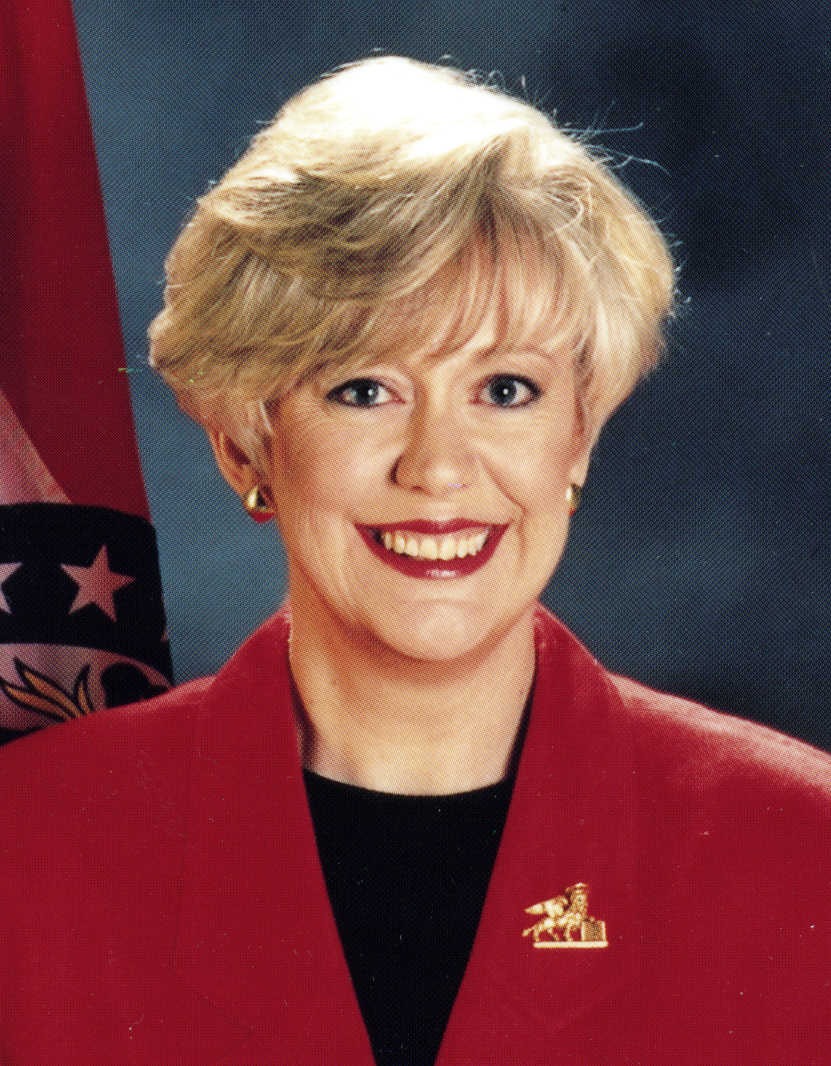

Nominee	Bekki Cook	John R. Hancock
Party	Democratic	Republican
Popular vote	1,053,681	984,613
Percentage	49.95%	46.68%
- County results Cook: 40–50% 50–60% 60–70% 70–80% Hancock: 40–50% 50–60% 60–70% 70–80%
Secretary of State before election
Bekki Cook (Acting)
Democratic
Elected Secretary of State
Bekki Cook
Democratic

The 1996 Missouri Secretary of State election was held on November 5, 1996, in order to elect the secretary of state of Missouri. Democratic nominee and incumbent acting secretary of state Bekki Cook defeated Republican nominee John R. Hancock, Libertarian nominee LaDonna Higgins and Natural Law nominee Kerry Margolis.

== General election ==
On election day, November 5, 1996, Democratic nominee Bekki Cook won the election by a margin of 69,068 votes against her foremost opponent Republican nominee John R. Hancock, thereby retaining Democratic control over the office of secretary of state. Cook was sworn in for her first full term on January 3, 1997.

=== Results ===
Missouri Secretary of State election, 1996
Party	Candidate	Votes	%
Democratic	Bekki Cook (incumbent)	1,053,681	49.95
Republican	John R. Hancock	984,613	46.68
Libertarian	LaDonna Higgins	50,944	2.42
Natural Law	Kerry Margolis	20,090	0.95
Total votes		2,109,328	100.00
Democratic hold			

== See also ==
- 1996 Missouri gubernatorial election
