= 1992 Missouri Secretary of State election =

- November 3, 1992
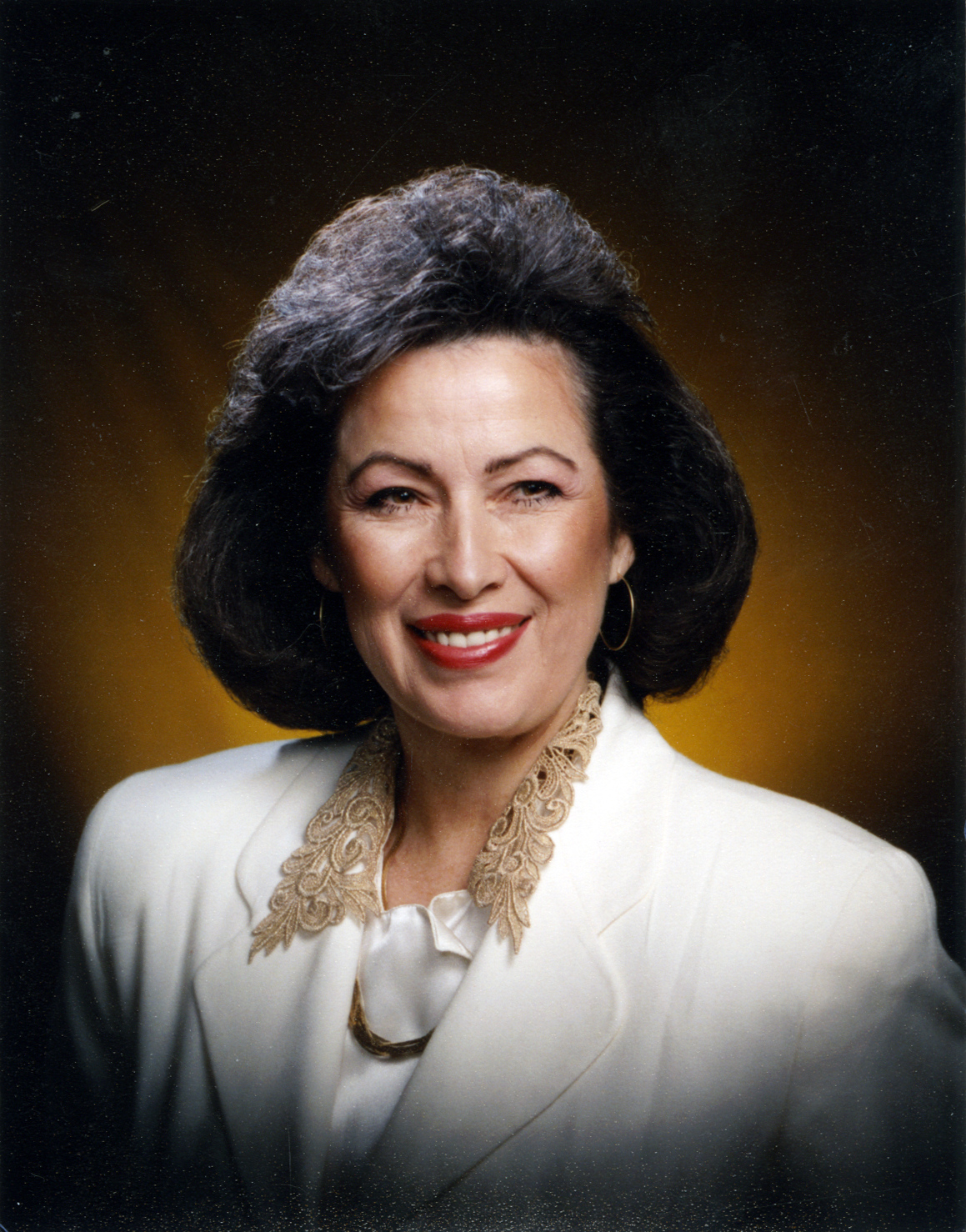

Nominee	Judith Moriarty	John R. Hancock
Party	Democratic	Republican
Popular vote	1,140,424	1,107,701
Percentage	49.42%	48.01%
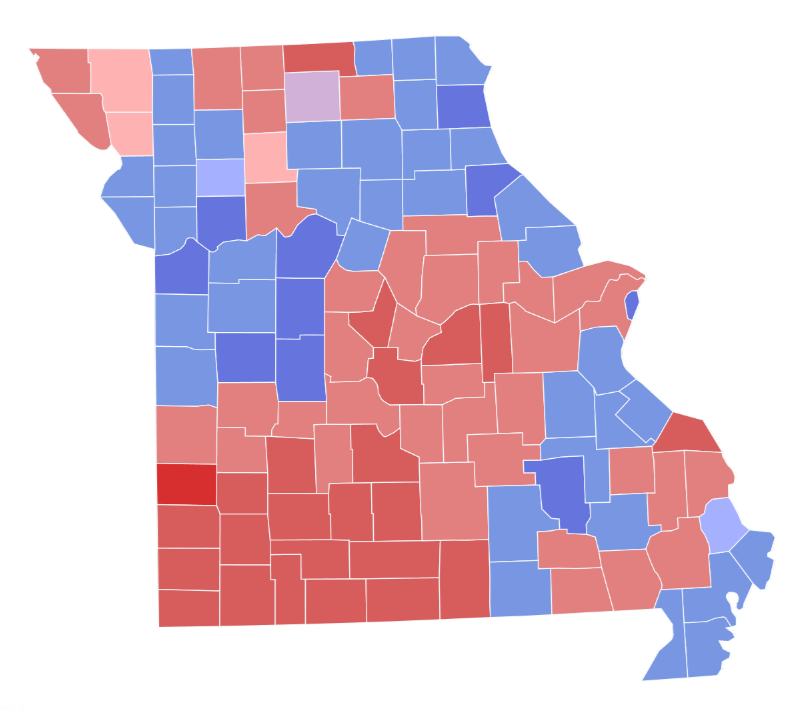
- County results Moriarty: 40–50% 50–60% 60–70% Hancock: 40–50% 50–60% 60–70% 70–80% Tie: 40–50%
Secretary of State before election
Roy Blunt
Republican
Elected Secretary of State
Judith Moriarty
Democratic

The 1992 Missouri Secretary of State election was held on November 3, 1992, in order to elect the secretary of state of Missouri. Democratic nominee Judith Moriarty defeated Republican nominee John R. Hancock and Libertarian nominee Eric Harris. Thereby becoming the first woman to be elected secretary of state of Missouri.

== General election ==
On election day, November 3, 1992, Democratic nominee Judith Moriarty won the election by a margin of 32,723 votes against her foremost opponent Republican nominee John R. Hancock, thereby gaining Democratic control over the office of secretary of state. Moriarty was sworn in as the 34th secretary of state of Missouri on January 12, 1993.

=== Results ===
Missouri Secretary of State election, 1992
Party	Candidate	Votes	%
Democratic	Judith Moriarty	1,140,424	49.42
Republican	John R. Hancock	1,107,701	48.01
Libertarian	Eric Harris	59,353	2.57
Total votes		2,307,478	100.00
Democratic gain from Republican			

== See also ==
- 1992 Missouri gubernatorial election
