= 1972 Missouri lieutenant gubernatorial election =

- November 7, 1972
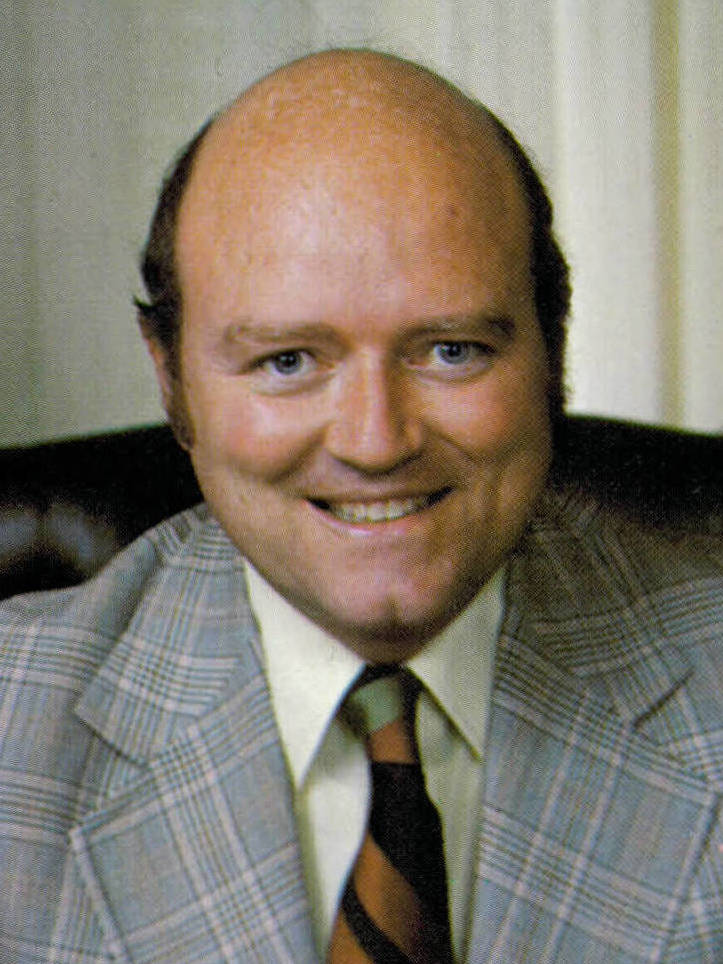

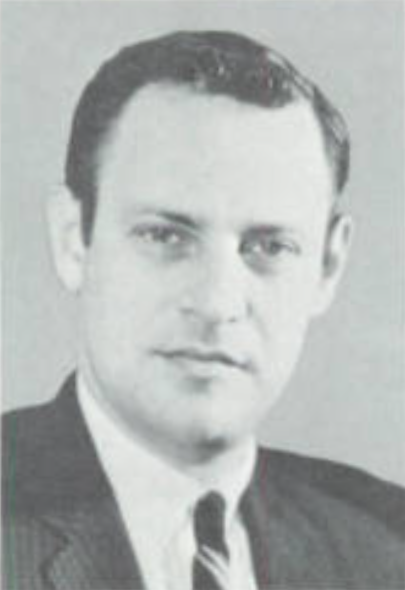
Nominee	Bill Phelps	Jack J. Schramm
Party	Republican	Democratic
Popular vote	908,346	899,423
Percentage	50.14%	49.65%
- County results Phelps: 40–50% 50–60% 60–70% 70–80% Schramm: 50–60% 60–70% 70–80%
Lieutenant Governor before election
William S. Morris
Democratic
Elected Lieutenant Governor
Bill Phelps
Republican

The 1972 Missouri lieutenant gubernatorial election was held on November 7, 1972. Republican nominee Bill Phelps narrowly defeated Democratic nominee Jack J. Schramm with 50.14% of the vote.

== Primary elections ==
Primary elections were held on August 8, 1972.

=== Democratic primary ===
==== Candidates ====
- James P. Aylward Jr.
- Leonard L. Bade
- John Owens Bond
- James E. Godfrey, speaker of the Missouri House of Representatives
- John C. McAllister
- Jack J. Schramm, state representative
- Wallace P. Wright

==== Results ====
Democratic primary results
Party	Candidate	Votes	%
Democratic	Jack J. Schramm	206,468	35.52
Democratic	James E. Godfrey	133,463	22.96
Democratic	James P. Aylward Jr.	95,759	16.47
Democratic	John Owens Bond	72,639	12.50
Democratic	John C. McAllister	45,554	7.84
Democratic	Wallace P. Wright	14,426	2.48
Democratic	Leonard L. Bade	13,014	2.24
Total votes		581,323	100.00

=== Republican primary ===
==== Candidates ====
- Joseph L. Badaracco, president of the St. Louis Board of Aldermen
- William B. "Bill" Ewald, former state representative
- Gregory Hansman
- Marvin L. Kennon, state representative
- Bill Phelps, state representative

==== Results ====
Republican primary results
Party	Candidate	Votes	%
Republican	Bill Phelps	114,286	36.17
Republican	Joseph L. Badaracco	111,791	35.38
Republican	Marvin L. Kennon	38,705	12.25
Republican	William B. "Bill" Ewald	37,700	11.93
Republican	Gregory Hansman	13,503	4.27
Total votes		315,985	100.00

== General election ==
=== Candidates ===
Major party candidates

- Bill Phelps, Republican
- Jack J. Schramm, Democratic

Other candidates

- Edward Verburg, nonpartisan

=== Results ===
1972 Missouri lieutenant gubernatorial election
Party	Candidate	Votes	%	±%
Republican	Bill Phelps	908,346	50.14%	
Democratic	Jack J. Schramm	899,423	49.65%	
Nonpartisan	Edward Verburg	3,770	0.21%	
Majority		8,923		
Turnout				
Republican gain from Democratic		Swing		
