= Joseph P. Teasdale =

American politician (1936–2014)

Joseph Teasdale
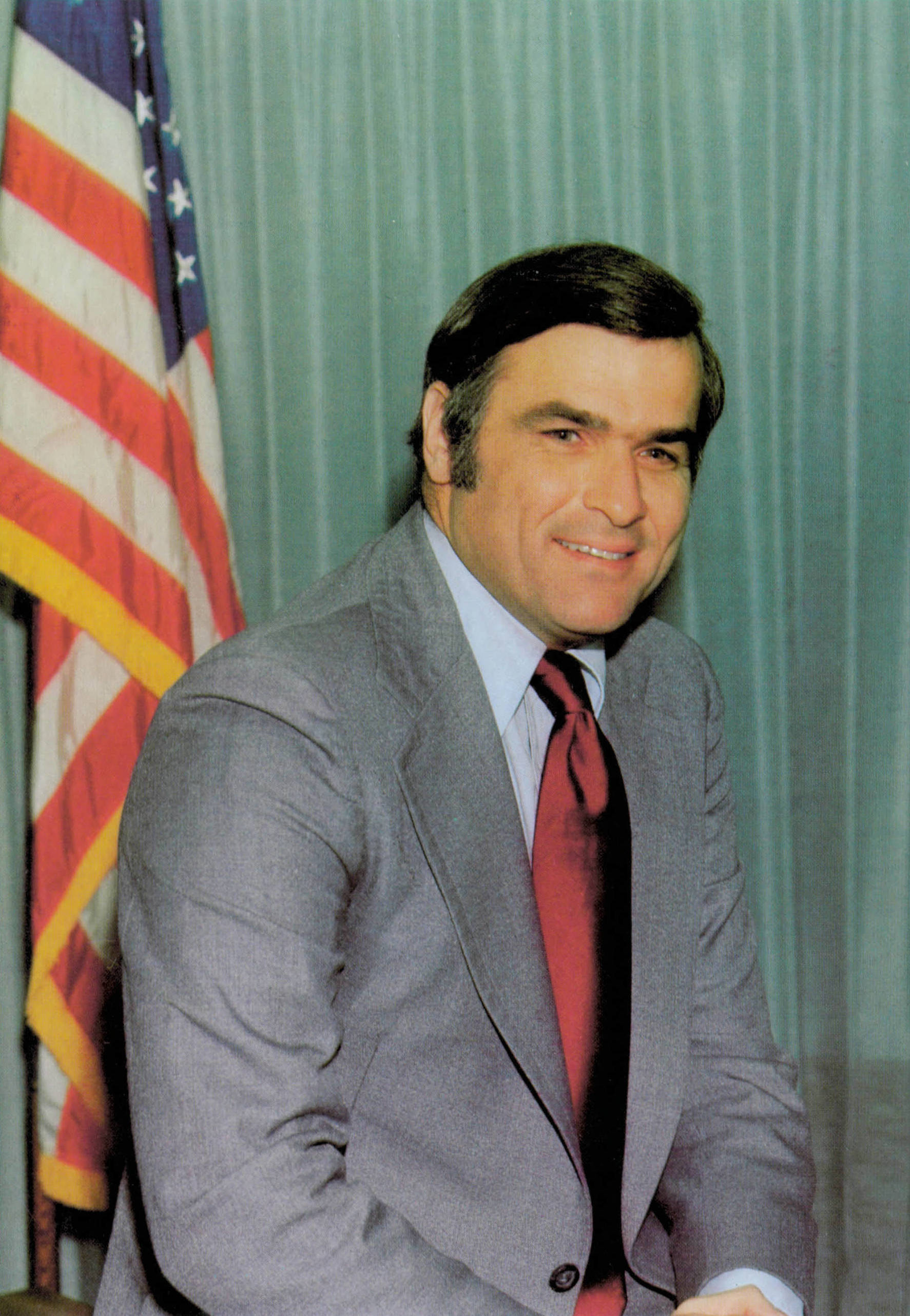
- Teasdale (c. 1977)

48th Governor of Missouri
- In office January 10, 1977 – January 12, 1981
- Lieutenant: Bill Phelps
- Preceded by: Kit Bond
- Succeeded by: Kit Bond

Prosecuting Attorney for Jackson County
- In office January 1, 1967 – January 1, 1973
- Preceded by: Lawrence F. Gepford
- Succeeded by: Ralph L. Martin

Assistant United States Attorney for the Western District of Missouri
- In office 1962–1965

Personal details
- Born: Joseph Patrick Teasdale; March 29, 1936 Kansas City, Missouri, U.S.
- Died: May 8, 2014 (aged 78) Kansas City, Missouri, U.S.
- Party: Democratic
- Spouse: Theresa Ferkenhoff (m. 1973)
- Children: 3
- Education: Rockhurst University (BA); Saint Louis University (JD)

Military service
- Allegiance: United States
- Branch/service: United States Air Force
- Years of service: 1961-1967
- Rank: Airman 3rd Class
- Unit: Reserves: 442nd Military Airlift Wing

Joseph Patrick Teasdale (March 29, 1936 – May 8, 2014) was an American politician. A Democrat, he served as the 48th governor of Missouri from 1977 to 1981. Teasdale was formerly a prosecutor for Jackson County, Missouri. In 1972, he made his first bid for governor, placing third in the Democratic primary, but attaining name recognition and the nickname "Walking Joe". In 1976, after initially running for U.S. Senate, Teasdale switched races and made a second bid for the governor's office. He won the nomination and defeated incumbent Kit Bond in an upset. In 1980, Teasdale beat back a primary challenge from State Treasurer Jim Spainhower, but was defeated by Bond in a rematch. After leaving office, Teasdale returned to practicing law until his death.

== Early life and education ==
Teasdale was born in Kansas City, Missouri, to William and Adah Downey Teasdale. Teasdale's father was a prominent Kansas City attorney. Joseph Teasdale and his three sisters were raised as devout Catholics.

He was a multi-sport athlete while attending Rockhurst High School, and would later be inducted into the school's Athletic Hall of Fame. Following graduation from high school, he attended St. Benedict's College (now Benedictine College) in Atchison, Kansas, where he was a member of the school's 1954 NAIA National Champion basketball team. He earned an undergraduate degree from Rockhurst University, and a Juris Doctor degree from Saint Louis University School of Law.

In the early 1960s, he enlisted in the U.S. Air Force Reserve, with his primary duty being at Whiteman Air Force Base where he served as an airman third class performing legal staff duties for the 442nd Military Airlift Wing. He served from 1961-1967.

== Career ==
=== Legal career ===
After law school, Teasdale worked as a law clerk for Judge Albert Ridge.

In 1962, he was appointed as assistant United States attorney for the Western District of Missouri. His duties included leading the organized crime division. Teasdale resigned from the position in 1965.

In 1966, Teasdale ran for prosecuting attorney for Jackson County, Missouri. He campaigned on combatting organized crime, which he said was a major concern. He also advocated for making the position a full-time job, increasing the office's relationship with local, state, and federal law enforcement, and hiring more investigators. In the primary, he faced Democratic incumbent Lawrence F. Gepford. Teasdale did not seek the endorsements of Democratic bosses, and described himself as an "independent" candidate for office. He was supported in this election by the Committee for County Progress, a group that supported challengers to older, entrenched incumbents. Teasdale defeated Gepford in what the Kansas City Times called a "major upset." He won the November 8 general election, defeating Republican Richard B. Globus. Teasdale's election made him the youngest person to ever hold the prosecutor's office. He was sworn in on January 1, 1967.

In office, Teasdale supported a bill in the state legislature that would have made the prosecutor's office a full time job. The bill was passed in 1967, and signed by Governor Warren Hearnes on June 30, 1967. The bill extended the office's term from two to four years, and increased Teasdale's salary from $15,000 to $22,500. He was re-elected to the office in 1968.

In 1970, he ran for Jackson County Judge, an office equivalent to a county executive, but was defeated narrowly in the Democratic primary by Harry Wiggins.

Teasdale left office in 1973, succeeded by Ralph L. Martin.

=== Gubernatorial elections ===
==== 1972 campaign ====
In 1971, Teasdale signaled his intent to run for the Democratic nomination for governor of Missouri in the 1972 election. Part of his candidacy was rooted in his youth, depicting himself as a new face of the party, echoing an appeal similar to John F. Kennedy. In the summer of 1971, Teasdale announced his intent to walk across the state to garner support for the campaign. He placed third in the primary, trailing nominee Edward L. Dowd and Lieutenant Governor William Morris. However, his campaign style earned him the nickname "Walking Joe." Teasdale appropriated the tactic from Florida politician "Walkin' Lawton Chiles. Teasdale campaign officials estimated that he had walked over 1,000 miles in the months leading up to the primary. Even though he lost the primary, he had gained name recognition and press coverage for his campaign. After the campaign was over, he hinted at a future bid for office.

==== 1976 campaign ====
In 1974, Teasdale launched a bid for the U.S. Senate seat held by Stuart Symington. During this campaign, he was critical of the policies of Henry Kissinger towards the Middle East. However, while campaigning, Teasdale found a groundswell of support for a second gubernatorial bid. Finding little support in his Senate bid, he soon dropped out, and switched to the governor's race. In the primary, Teasdale faced a challenge against Senate President Pro Tempore William Cason. Cason was the favorite amongst most Democratic groups. In spite of this, Teasdale defeated Cason in the August 3rd primary. In the November election, Teasdale faced incumbent Governor Kit Bond. Bond appeared the heavy favorite, and one poll showed Bond ahead of Teasdale 51 percent to 36 percent. Running on a platform of working for common Missourians and vowing to fight big utility company rate hikes, Teasdale painted Bond as being too friendly to big business interests. In the closing weeks, Teasdale ran a last-minute campaign of ads, outspending Bond during the period. On election night, NBC called the race for Bond minutes after polls closed. in the end, Teasdale was elected governor by 13,000 votes. His win in the 1976 Missouri gubernatorial election was considered an upset. The victory prompted CBS News anchorman Dan Rather to quip on the air, "the story in the Midwest is not Jimmy Carter, it's Walkin' Joe Teasdale!"

=== Governor of Missouri ===
Teasdale's upset caught many off-guard, including Teasdale himself, who had not assembled a transition team. The ensuing transition was marred by a lack of preparation from Teasdale, a lack of cooperation from Bond, and no official laws in place to aid the process. Three weeks before his inauguration and after an unannounced vacation to Florida, Teasdale had still not announced any picks for his staff. During this time, he avoided interactions with the press, and focused on getting a better understanding of the job.

Teasdale had been the first Missouri governor to hail from Kansas City in over 80 years. During his tenure, he fought against utility companies by appointing new members to the Missouri Public Service Commission, the state agency tasked with approving or denying rates. He also established the state's first Division of Aging, boosting funding for the Department of Mental Health and overseeing the rewriting of numerous health laws. He advocated strongly for the Nursing Home Reform Act and the removal of sales tax on prescription drugs. He proved willing to reach across party lines, supporting Republican Mel Hancock's amendment to limit state taxes. Teasdale came out strongly against the Meramec Dam project, which would have greatly affected rivers in areas southwest of St. Louis. He signed legislation reinstating the death penalty in Missouri in 1977, but later regretted the decision. In 1980, Teasdale campaigned for federal aid to deal with the year's heatwave, and was critical of federal bureaucrats who he maintained were ignoring the impact of the heat in affected states. Missouri would receive $1,250,000 in aid. Also in 1980, Teasdale had a veto overridden by the state legislature when he opposed the construction of the Harry S. Truman state office building in Jefferson City, citing the building as having too many "frills".

=== 1980 re-election campaign ===
In 1980 Teasdale faced a Democratic primary challenge from then-State Treasurer Jim Spainhower. Spainhower had been considered a potential challenger since 1977, owing to the fact he had been term-limited as state treasurer. In 1978, Teasdale met with Spainhower to discuss his plans in 1980, and came to the conclusion that Spainhower would challenge him. Spainhower made his plans official on August 15, 1979, attacking Teasdale for his failures to lead, and for cronyism. Moreover, Spainhower received support from prominent Democrats such as Senator Thomas Eagleton and St. Louis Mayor Jim Conway. Teasdale was successful in defeating Spainhower, and faced Kit Bond in a rematch of the 1976 contest. Teasdale attacked Bond as having governed for the wealthy, and Bond attacked Teasdale for not reducing utility rates. In the November election, Bond defeated Teasdale 53% to 47%.

== Post-governorship ==
After leaving the governorship in January, 1981, Teasdale returned to the Kansas City area and established a law practice. One of his most notable cases was representing victims and surviving family of the Hyatt Regency walkway collapse. An avid outdoorsman all his life, he often spent time on hunting and fishing trips.

Teasdale largely avoided politics after his defeat, telling one newspaper reporter in 1993, "I wanted to become a normal person again, and I really wasn't normal before. For 20 years I was completely consumed by politics." In 1981, he declined a bid for the open 5th congressional district vacated by Richard Bolling, due to wanting to devote time to his family and law practice, but also not wanting to incur more debts, still paying off his 1980 debts.

In 1982, he endorsed Burleigh Arnold in the Democratic primary for U.S. Senate, and criticized Harriet Woods for her stance on abortion. Woods won the primary, and Teasdale endorsed her over eventual winner John Danforth. In 1983, he endorsed Charles Curry for president, as part of a campaign to help a favorite son candidate give Missouri influence in the nomination process. In 1984, he endorsed state treasurer Mel Carnahan for governor. That same year, he also re-registered to vote, having let his voter registration lapse after leaving office.

In 1992, he managed the campaign of Judith Moriarty to be secretary of state of Missouri. Moriarty won, but was later impeached and removed from office in 1994.

In the late 1990s, his position on capital punishment having changed, Teasdale worked to achieve clemency for David Leisure, a man convicted of murder for a 1980 car bombing in St. Louis.

== Personal life ==
On October 13, 1973, Teasdale married Theresa Ferkenhoff. The couple had three sons, Bill, John, and Kevin. His middle son, John, was a multisport standout at Rockhurst High School like his father before him, and later played offensive tackle at the University of Notre Dame.

Teasdale died on May 8, 2014, in Kansas City, Missouri, of complications from pneumonia.

== Election history ==
1980 gubernatorial election, Missouri
Party	Candidate	Votes	%	±%
Republican	Kit Bond	1,098,950	52.63	+3.08
Democratic	Joseph P. Teasdale (incumbent)	981,884	47.02	−3.21
Socialist Workers	Helen Savio	7,193	0.34	+0.34
Majority		117,066	5.61	+4.93
Turnout		2,088,027	42.47	+1.13
Republican gain from Democratic		Swing		

1976 gubernatorial election, Missouri
Party	Candidate	Votes	%	±%
Democratic	Joseph P. Teasdale	971,184	50.23	+5.59
Republican	Kit Bond (incumbent)	958,110	49.55	−5.63
Nonpartisan	Leon Striler	4,215	0.22	+0.03
N/A	write-ins	46	0.00	±0.00
Socialist Workers	Helen Savio	20	0.00	±0.00
Majority		13,074	0.68	−9.86
Turnout		1,933,575	41.34	+1.45
Democratic gain from Republican		Swing		

Party political offices
Preceded by Edward Dowd	Democratic nominee for Governor of Missouri; 1976, 1980	Succeeded by Ken Rothman
Political offices
Preceded by Kit Bond	Governor of Missouri; 1977–1981	Succeeded by Kit Bond
