= 1980 Missouri lieutenant gubernatorial election =

- November 4, 1980
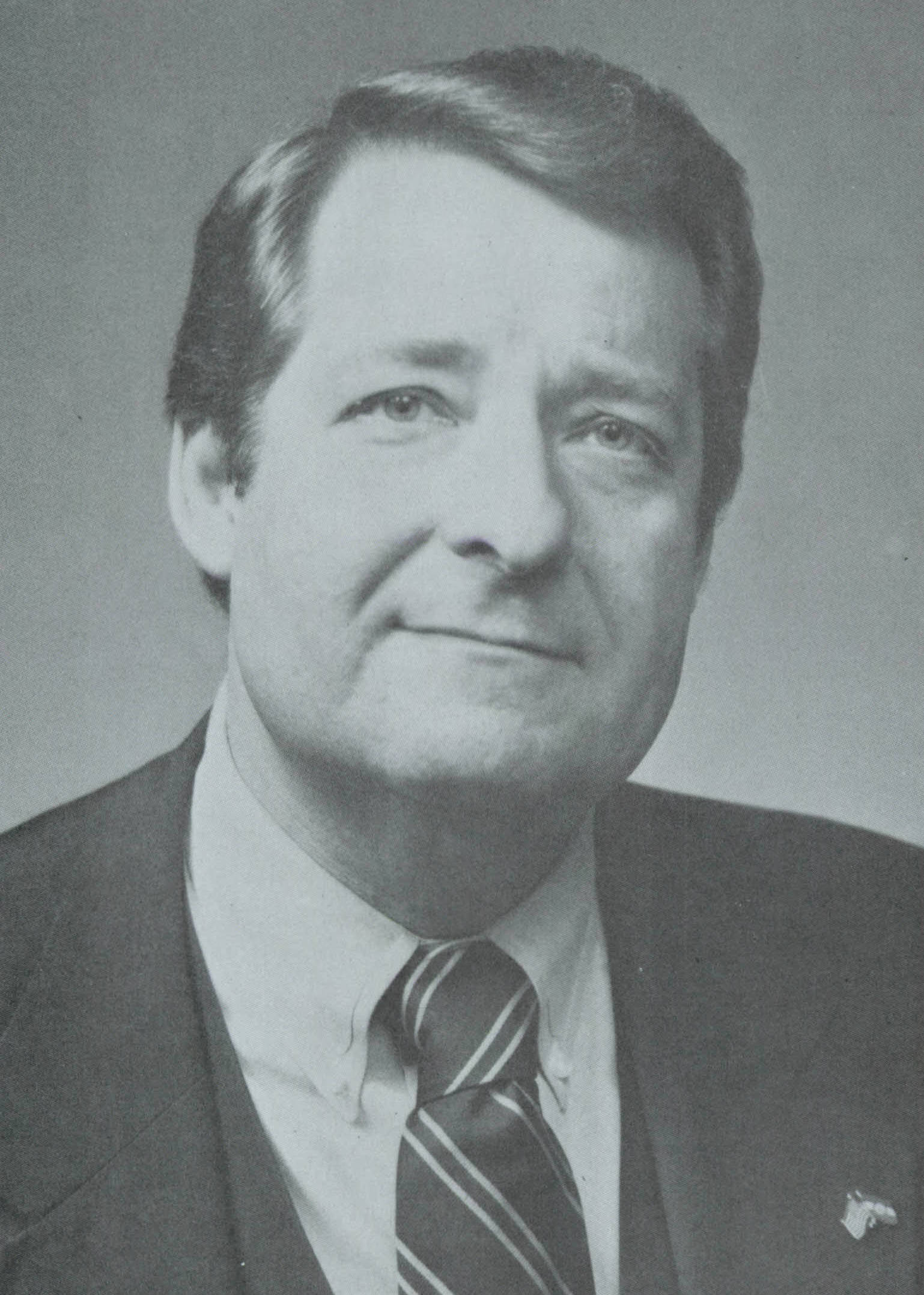

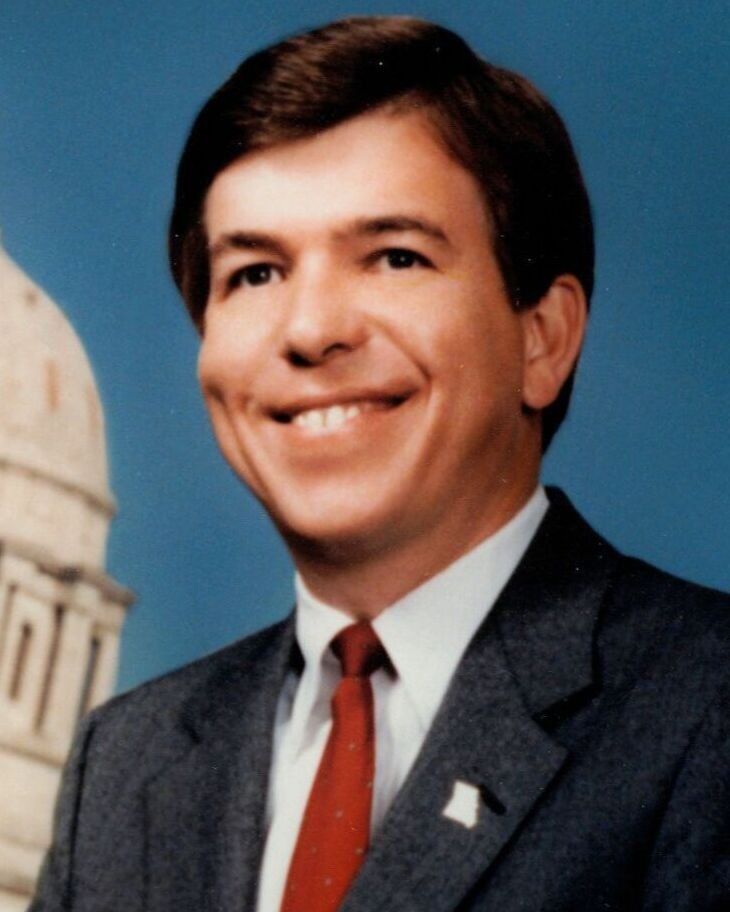
Nominee	Ken Rothman	Roy Blunt
Party	Democratic	Republican
Popular vote	1,121,208	890,006
Percentage	55.7%	44.2%
- County results Rothman: 50–60% 60–70% 70–80% Blunt: 50–60% 60–70% 70–80%
Lieutenant Governor before election
Bill Phelps
Republican
Elected Lieutenant Governor
Ken Rothman
Democratic

The 1980 Missouri lieutenant gubernatorial election was held on November 4, 1980. Democratic nominee Ken Rothman defeated Republican nominee Roy Blunt with 55.75% of the vote.

== Primary elections ==
Primary elections were held on August 5, 1980.

=== Democratic primary ===
==== Candidates ====
- William Roy Bean
- Ken Carnes
- Mickey Owen, baseball player
- Ken Rothman, Speaker of the Missouri House of Representatives
- Roy Smith

==== Results ====
Democratic primary results
Party	Candidate	Votes	%
Democratic	Ken Rothman	325,986	55.08
Democratic	Ken Carnes	113,728	19.22
Democratic	Mickey Owen	79,038	13.36
Democratic	William Roy Bean	44,546	7.53
Democratic	Roy Smith	28,537	4.82
Total votes		591,835	100.00

== General election ==
=== Candidates ===
- Roy Blunt, Republican
- Ken Rothman, Democratic

=== Results ===
1980 Missouri lieutenant gubernatorial election
Party	Candidate	Votes	%	±%
Democratic	Ken Rothman	1,121,208	55.75%	
Republican	Roy Blunt	890,006	44.25%	
Majority		231,202		
Turnout				
Democratic gain from Republican		Swing		
