= 2004 Missouri lieutenant gubernatorial election =

2004 Missouri Lieutenant gubernatorial election
- November 2, 2004
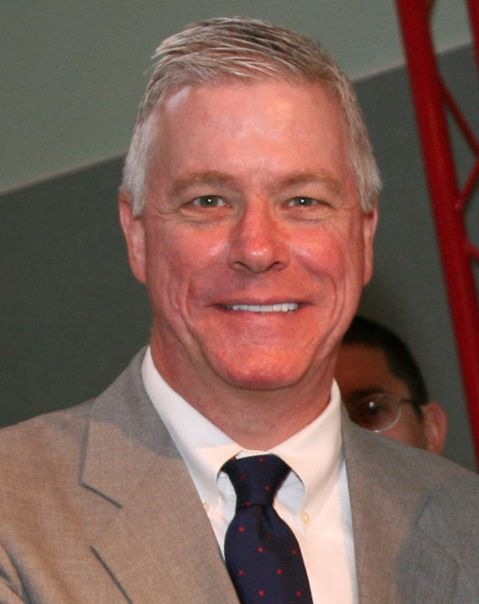

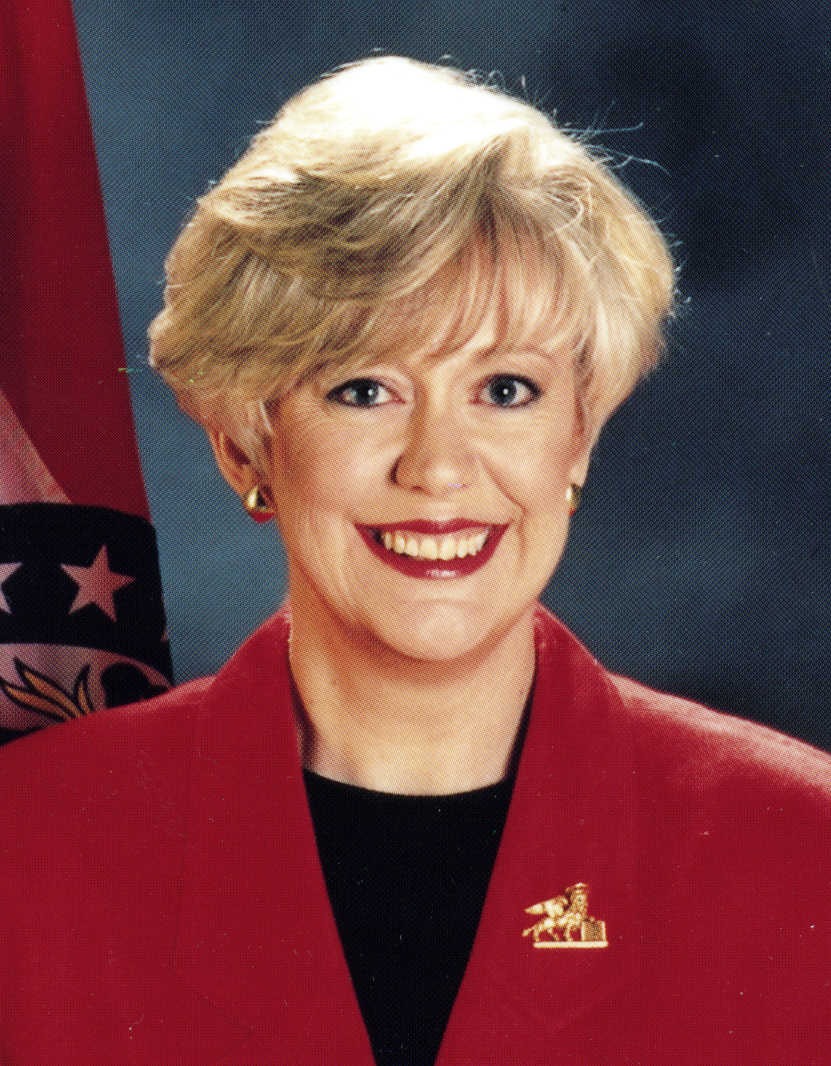
| Nominee | Peter Kinder | Bekki Cook |
| Party | Republican | Democratic |
| Popular vote | 1,300,209 | 1,286,295 |
| Percentage | 49.0% | 48.4% |
- County results Kinder: 40–50% 50–60% 60–70% 70–80% Cook: 40–50% 50–60% 60–70% 70–80%
Lieutenant Governor before election
Joe Maxwell
Democratic
Elected Lieutenant Governor
Peter Kinder
Republican

The 2004 Missouri lieutenant gubernatorial election was an election for the lieutenant governor of Missouri, held on November 2, 2004. Republican Peter Kinder won the election narrowly, becoming the first Republican to hold the office since Edward Henry Winter in 1933. As of 2025, this remains the last time that the lieutenant governorship of Missouri changed partisan control.

== Candidates ==
=== Republican ===
- Peter Kinder, Missouri state senator
- Pat Secrest, Missouri state representative

=== Democratic ===
- Bekki Cook, former Missouri secretary of state
- Ken Jacob, Missouri state senator

=== Libertarian ===
- Mike Ferguson

=== Constitution ===
- Bruce Hillis

== Primary elections ==
Democratic primary results
| Party | Candidate | Votes | % |
|---|---|---|---|
| Democratic | Bekki Cook | 493,081 | 64.28 |
| Democratic | Ken Jacob | 273,953 | 35.72 |
| Total votes | | 767,034 | 100 |

Republican primary results
| Party | Candidate | Votes | % |
|---|---|---|---|
| Republican | Peter Kinder | 313,528 | 56.16 |
| Republican | Pat Secrest | 244,699 | 43.84 |
| Total votes | | 558,227 | 100 |

Libertarian primary results
| Party | Candidate | Votes | % |
|---|---|---|---|
| Libertarian | Mike Ferguson | 3,864 | 100.00 |
| Total votes | | 3,864 | 100.00 |

== Results ==
2004 Missouri lieutenant gubernatorial election
| Party | Candidate | Votes | % | ±% |
|---|---|---|---|---|
| Republican | Peter Kinder | 1,300,209 | 48.95% | +4.95% |
| Democratic | Bekki Cook | 1,286,295 | 48.43% | −3.71% |
| Libertarian | Mike Ferguson | 53,770 | 2.02% | +1.14% |
| Constitution | Bruce Hillis | 15,935 | 0.60% | −0.08% |
| Majority | | 13,914 | 0.52% | −7.61% |
| Turnout | | 2,656,109 | | |
| Republican gain from Democratic | | Swing | | |

== See also ==
- 2004 United States gubernatorial elections
- 2004 Missouri gubernatorial election
