= Ken Rothman =

American politician and lawyer (1935–2019)

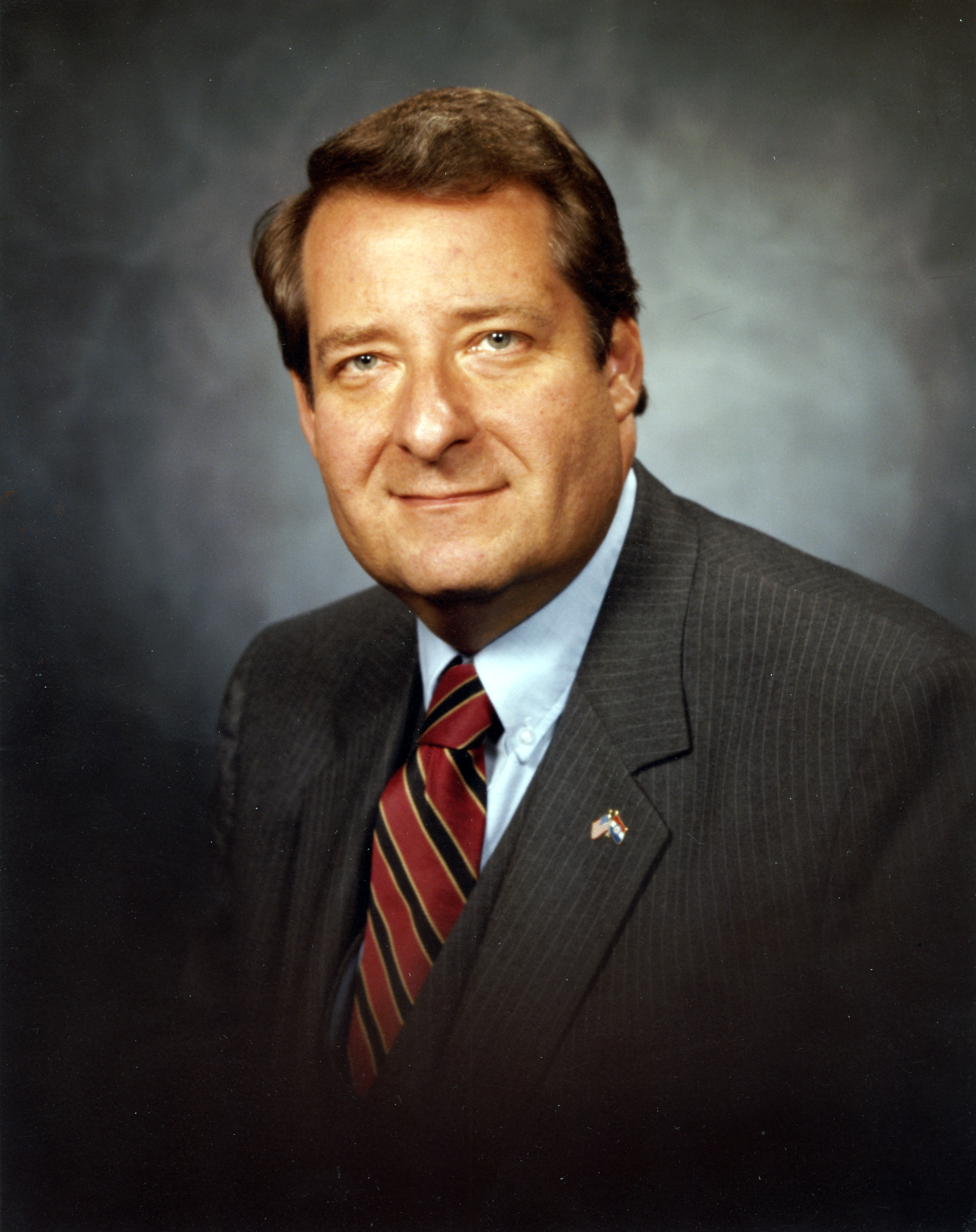

41st Lieutenant Governor of Missouri
- In office January 12, 1981 – January 14, 1985
- Governor: Kit Bond
- Preceded by: William C. Phelps
- Succeeded by: Harriett Woods

65th Speaker of the Missouri House of Representatives
- In office January 5, 1977 – January 7, 1981
- Preceded by: Richard J. Rabbitt
- Succeeded by: Bob F. Griffin

Member of the Missouri House of Representatives from the 77th district
- In office January 3, 1973 – January 7, 1981
- Preceded by: Dorothy E. Meagher
- Succeeded by: Sheila Lumpe

Member of the Missouri House of Representatives from the 36th district
- In office January 4, 1967 – January 3, 1973
- Preceded by: None (new district)
- Succeeded by: Leo McKamey

Member of the Missouri House of Representatives from St. Louis district 8
- In office January 9, 1963 – January 4, 1967
- Preceded by: Alfred A. Speer
- Succeeded by: None (district eliminated)

Personal details
- Born: Kenneth Joel Rothman; October 11, 1935 St. Louis, Missouri, U.S.
- Died: April 26, 2019 (aged 83) St. Louis, Missouri, U.S.
- Party: Democratic
- Spouse: Geraldine Jaffe (divorced)
- Children: 4
- Education: Washington University in St. Louis

Military service
- Allegiance: United States
- Branch/service: United States Air Force
- Years of service: 1953-1962
- Unit: Missouri Air National Guard

Kenneth Joel Rothman (October 11, 1935 – April 26, 2019) was an American lawyer and politician from Missouri. He served as the 41st Lieutenant Governor of Missouri from 1981 to 1985.

== Biography ==
Rothman was born and raised in St. Louis and attended public schools. He graduated from Washington University in St. Louis with a Bachelor of Arts in history and political science and also received his law degree from Washington University School of Law.

Rothman served in the Missouri Air National Guard from 1953 to 1962 and was called to active duty during the Berlin Crisis of 1961. He worked as a prosecutor for St. Louis County before entering private law practice. Rothman's political career began with his election to the Missouri House of Representatives in 1962 representing the Clayton area. He was re-elected eight times. In 1973 he was chosen as Majority Leader and in 1976 he became Speaker of the House.

In 1980 Rothman was elected Lieutenant Governor, defeating Roy Blunt. In 1984, he was the Democratic nominee for Governor of Missouri but was defeated by Republican John Ashcroft.

From 2001, he served of counsel to the law firm of Capes, Sokol, Goodman and Sarachan PC.

Rothman's ex-wife, Geri Rothman-Serot, was the Democratic nominee for the United States Senate against Kit Bond in 1992. Ken Rothman was the first Jew elected to statewide office in the history of Missouri.

Rothman died on April 26, 2019, in St. Louis, at the age of 83. His ex-wife politician Geri Rothman-Serot, a three-time survivor of breast cancer, died a few months later in Florida on July 2, 2019, of a rare form of bone cancer.

Party political offices
Preceded by Richard J. Rabbitt	Democratic nominee for Lieutenant Governor of Missouri; 1980	Succeeded by Harriett Woods
Preceded by Joseph P. Teasdale	Democratic nominee for Governor of Missouri; 1984	Succeeded by Betty Cooper Hearnes
Political offices
Preceded by Bill Phelps	Lieutenant Governor of Missouri; 1981-1985	Succeeded by Harriett Woods
Preceded by Richard J. Rabbitt	Speaker of the Missouri House of Representatives; 1977– 1980	Succeeded by Bob F. Griffin
