= Senator Cason =

Senator Cason may refer to:

- Thomas J. Cason (1828–1901), Indiana State Senate
- William J. Cason (1924–2017), Missouri State Senate
