= 1976 Missouri lieutenant gubernatorial election =

- November 2, 1976
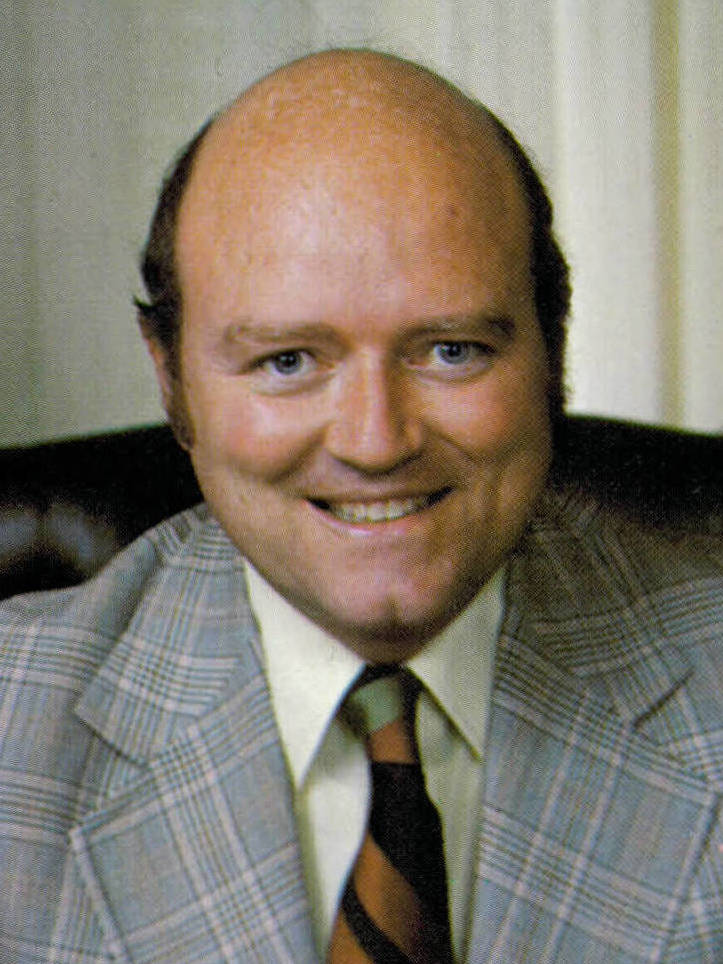

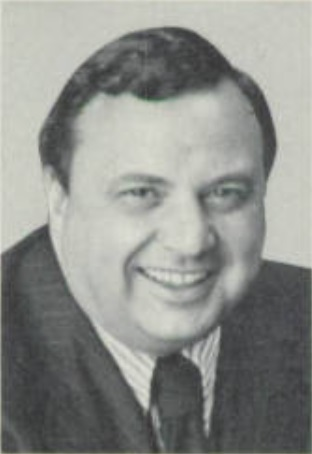
Nominee	Bill Phelps	Richard J. Rabbitt
Party	Republican	Democratic
Popular vote	946,890	936,527
Percentage	50.0%	49.4%
- County results Phelps: 40–50% 50–60% 60–70% 70–80% Rabbitt: 50–60% 60–70% 70–80%
Lieutenant Governor before election
Bill Phelps
Republican
Elected Lieutenant Governor
Bill Phelps
Republican

The 1976 Missouri lieutenant gubernatorial election was held on November 2, 1976. Incumbent Republican Bill Phelps defeated Democratic nominee Richard J. Rabbitt with 50.0% of the vote.

== Primary elections ==
Primary elections were held on August 3, 1976.

=== Democratic primary ===
==== Candidates ====
- Richard J. Rabbitt, Speaker of the Missouri House of Representatives
- John C. McAllister
- Alberta Slavin
- Leonard L. Bade

==== Results ====
Democratic primary results
Party	Candidate	Votes	%
Democratic	Richard J. Rabbitt	413,181	54.55
Democratic	John C. McAllister	168,108	22.20
Democratic	Alberta Slavin	144,507	19.08
Democratic	Leonard L. Bade	31,600	4.17
Total votes		757,396	100.00

== General election ==
=== Candidates ===
Major party candidates

- Bill Phelps, Republican
- Richard J. Rabbitt, Democratic

Other candidates

- Leo J. Fischer, Nonpartisan

=== Results ===
1976 Missouri lieutenant gubernatorial election
Party	Candidate	Votes	%	±%
Republican	Bill Phelps (incumbent)	946,890	50.00%	
Democratic	Richard J. Rabbitt	936,527	49.45%	
Nonpartisan	Leo J. Fischer	10,529	0.56%	
Majority		10,363		
Turnout				
Republican hold		Swing		
