= 1980 Missouri gubernatorial election =

- November 4, 1980
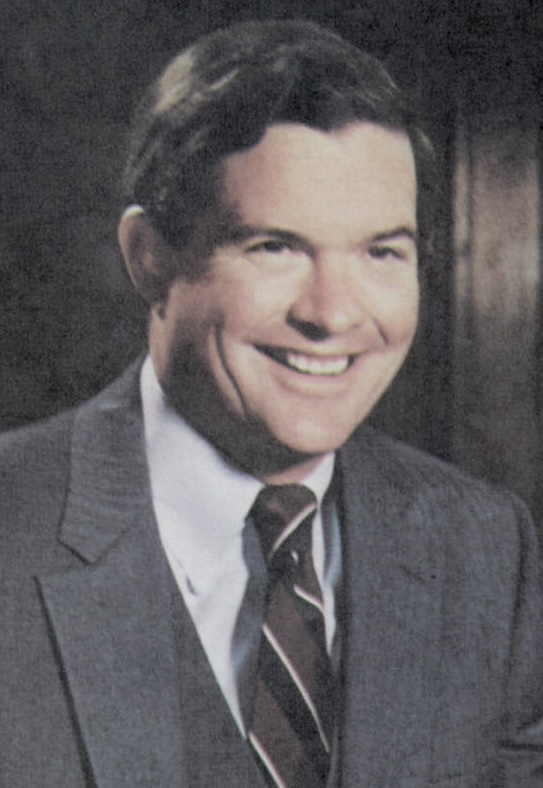

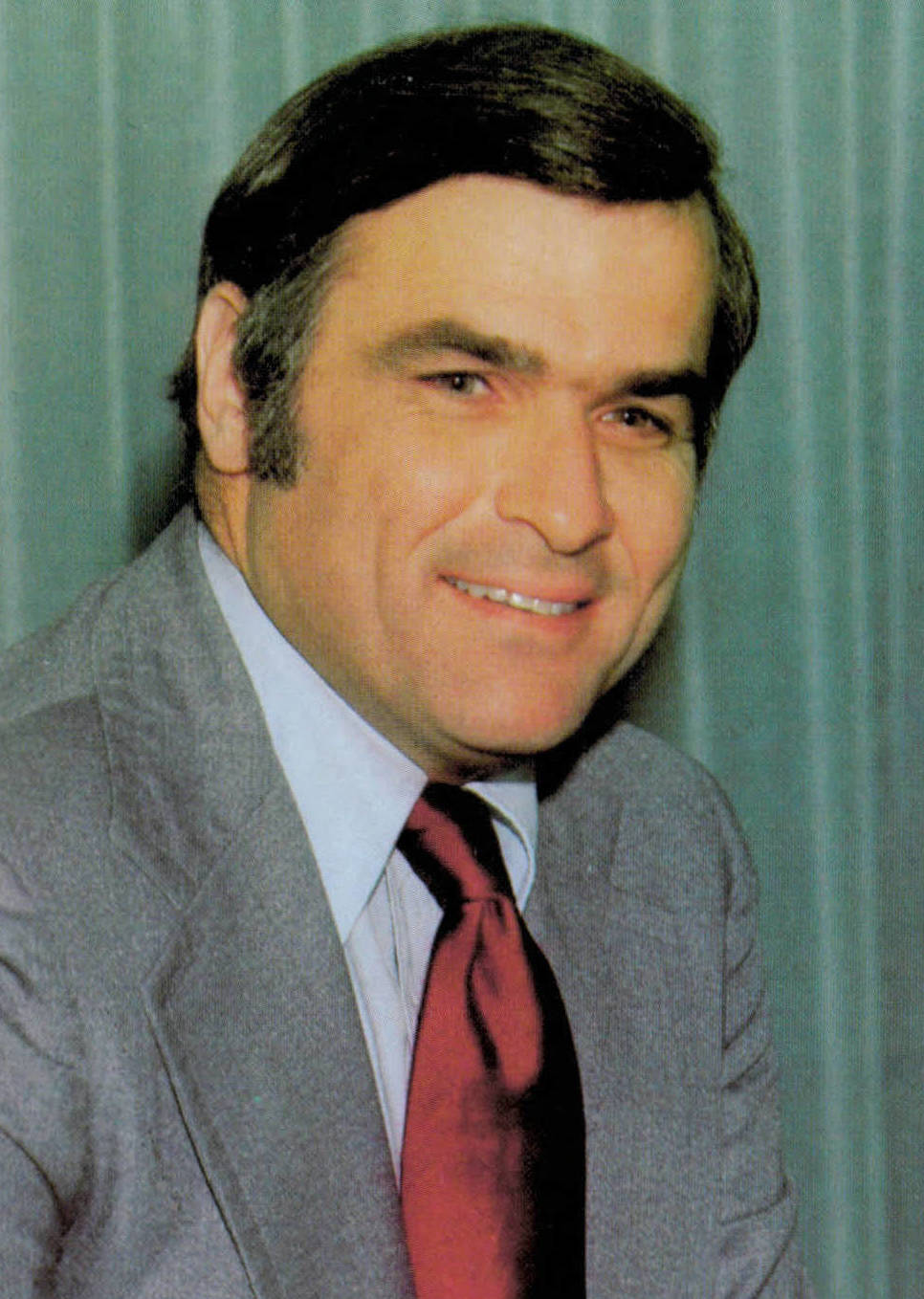
Nominee	Kit Bond	Joseph Teasdale
Party	Republican	Democratic
Popular vote	1,098,950	981,884
Percentage	52.63%	47.02%
- County results Bond: 50–60% 60–70% Teasdale: 40–50% 50–60% 60–70%
Governor before election
Joseph Teasdale
Democratic
Elected Governor
Kit Bond
Republican

The 1980 Missouri gubernatorial election was held on November 4, 1980 and resulted in a victory for the Republican nominee, former Governor Kit Bond, over the Democratic candidate, incumbent Governor Joseph P. Teasdale, and Socialist Workers candidate Helen Savio.

This election was the second in which Kit Bond and Joseph Teasdale faced off, and the third consecutive Missouri gubernatorial election in which Kit Bond was the Republican nominee. To date, this was the last time an incumbent Governor of Missouri lost re-election until Bob Holden was defeated in the 2004 Democratic primary.

== Democratic primary ==
=== Candidates ===
- Milton Morris
- James Spainhower, State Treasurer
- Joseph P. Teasdale, incumbent governor since 1977

=== Results ===
1980 Democratic gubernatorial primary
Party	Candidate	Votes	%
Democratic	Joseph P. Teasdale (incumbent)	359,263	53.98%
Democratic	James Spainhower	294,917	44.31%
Democratic	Milton Morris	11,377	1.71%
Total votes		665,557	100.00%

== Republican primary ==
=== Candidates ===
- Paul Binggeli
- Kit Bond, former governor (1973-1977)
- Bill Phelps, lieutenant governor since 1973
- Troy Spencer

=== Results ===
1980 Republican gubernatorial primary
Party	Candidate	Votes	%
Republican	Kit Bond	223,678	63.53%
Republican	Bill Phelps	122,867	34.90%
Republican	Troy Spencer	3,532	1.00%
Republican	Paul Binggeli	2,002	0.57%
Total votes		352,079	100.00%

== General election ==
=== Results ===
1980 gubernatorial election, Missouri
Party	Candidate	Votes	%	±%
Republican	Kit Bond	1,098,950	52.63%	▲3.08
Democratic	Joseph P. Teasdale (incumbent)	981,884	47.02%	▼3.21
Socialist Workers	Helen Savio	7,193	0.34%	▲0.34
Majority		117,066	5.61	+4.93
Turnout		2,088,027	42.47	+1.13
Republican gain from Democratic		Swing		
