= Richard J. Rabbitt =

American politician (1935–2011)

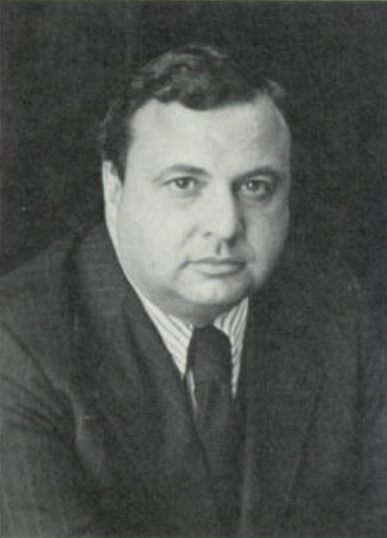

Member of the Missouri House of Representatives
- In office 1960–1976

Personal details
- Born: October 30, 1935 St. Louis, Missouri, US
- Died: December 9, 2011 (aged 76) St. Louis, Missouri, US
- Party: Democratic
- Education: St. Louis University

Richard J. Rabbitt (October 30, 1935 – December 9, 2011) was an American Democratic politician from St. Louis, Missouri who was Speaker of the Missouri House of Representatives from 1973 to 1976.

Rabbitt was born in St. Louis and graduated from Christian Brothers College High School, a local Catholic school. He earned a B.S. in political science and an LL.B. from St. Louis University in Missouri and began to practice law in St. Louis. He married and had six children.

Richard Rabbitt was elected to the Missouri House of Representatives in 1960 and remained a member of the House until 1976. He served as majority floor leader from 1967 through 1972, when he became Speaker of the House. He remained Speaker until he resigned in 1976 to campaign as a candidate for Missouri Lieutenant Governor which he narrowly lost to Bill Phelps.

Rabbitt's responsibilities as majority floor leader included establishing the time of meeting and order of business of the House of Representatives. As Speaker, Rabbitt presided over the house-assembly, appointed all the members of all committees, including the chairmen of the committees, assigned all bills to committees, and performed other miscellaneous duties.

He served as a member of the National Legislative Leaders Conference from 1967 to 1975. Among his numerous legislative achievements, in 1976 he signed into law the Nurse Practice Act, the first time in a century in Missouri that a Speaker signed a bill into law following an override of a governor's veto. He also helped secure funding for the establishment of the Japanese Garden at the Missouri Botanical Garden. A lifelong lover of opera and classical music, he served on the Board of Directors of the St. Louis Symphony. Following his distinguished career in public service, he was the Deputy Executive Director of the St. Louis Housing Authority, worked in the Law Department of Unigroup, Inc., and continued practicing law into his retirement. Among his many accomplishments, he was honored with the Spirit of Life award by the City of Hope in 1975, at the testimonial establishing a fellowship in his name at the City of Hope - a pilot medical center. He was also awarded in 1973 the Distinguished Service Citation by the Optimist Club West, St. Louis for being a loyal member and exemplifying the high ideal of service to others that all Optimist Clubs encourage.

In 1977, the United States District Court for the Eastern District of Missouri delivered a verdict which convicted Richard Rabbitt on eleven counts of violation of 18 U.S.C. § 1341 (1976), and four counts in violation of the Hobbs Act, 18 U.S.C. § 1951 (1976). Upon appeal in 1978, the United States Court of Appeals for the Eighth Circuit reversed and dismissed 11 counts, but sustained one count of mail fraud and three of extortion.

The four counts that were upheld were based on 2 charges: (1) that Rabbitt had requested indirect payment of $20,000 from an automobile dealers association in return for favorable treatment of legislation and (2) that Rabbitt had threatened to give unfavorable treatment to a bill addressing the trucking industry unless he received legal business. In his defense, with respect to the first charge, Rabbitt asserted that John Connaghan was the party that had actually received payment from the automobile dealers association and that Rabbitt had only received referrals fees from John Connaghan for cases referred to him. The court, however, decided that there was sufficient evidence to deliver a verdict finding that fees paid to Connaghan had then been paid over to Rabbitt.

After time served for the sustained counts, Rabbitt was later re-admitted to the Missouri State Bar and resumed the practice of law.

Rabbitt was of Irish descent and a member of the Ancient Order of Hibernians in St. Louis. He died of heart failure in December 2011.

Party political offices
Preceded by Jack J. Schramm	Democratic nominee for Lieutenant Governor of Missouri; 1976	Succeeded by Ken Rothman
Political offices
Preceded by James E. Godfrey	Speaker of the Missouri House of Representatives; 1973–1976	Succeeded by Ken Rothman
