= Lem T. Jones Jr. =

American politician from Missouri

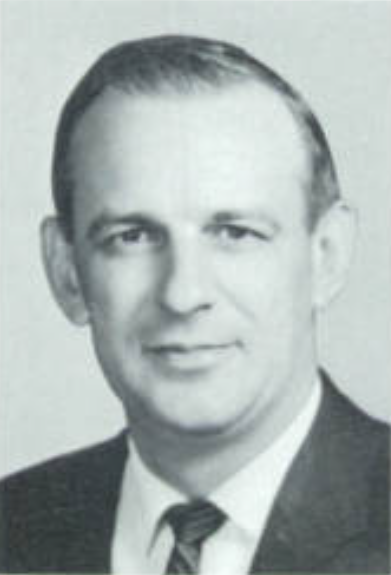

Member of the Missouri Senate from the 10th district
- In office 1965–1975

Personal details
- Born: Lemuel Theophilus Jones Jr. March 15, 1924 Chicago, Illinois, U.S.
- Died: December 17, 1995 (aged 71) Kansas City, Missouri, U.S.
- Party: Republican
- Spouse: Laverne Boes
- Children: 2
- Education: University of Iowa (LLB)
- Occupation: Politician; lawyer

Military service
- Branch/service: United States Navy
- Years of service: 1942–1947 (active)
- Rank: Lieutenant commander
- Battles/wars: World War II

Lemuel Theophilus Jones Jr. (March 15, 1924 – December 17, 1995) was an American politician in the state of Missouri. He served in the Missouri State Senate as a Republican from 1965 to 1975.

== Early life ==
Lemuel Theophilus Jones Jr. was born on March 15, 1924, to Lemuel and Jessie Jones in Chicago, Illinois. They moved to Kansas City, Missouri in his childhood, where Jones attended local schools, including Southwest High School, Kansas City Junior College, and the University of Kansas. After graduating, Jones was commissioned as an officer in the United States Navy, where he served as a pilot during World War II, reaching the rank of Lieutenant Commander.

After the war, he attended the University of Iowa, studying for his LLB. There, he married Laverne Boes, and the two would go on to have two children, David and Marcia. He then moved back to Kansas City and started a law practice, where he entered local politics with the Republican Party.

== Political career ==
Jones' first foray into politics was when he ran for U.S. Congress in 1956 from Missouri's 5th congressional district, but he lost the election to Richard W. Bolling. Despite his loss, he persisted in local politics, serving on the Jackson County Republican Committee from 1962 to 1964 and the St. Louis 9th Ward Republican Committee from 1962 to 1966. He then was elected to the State Senate in a special election taking place in the 10th district. He was re-elected in 1966 and 1970 but lost his bid for a third term to Democrat Harry Wiggins in 1974.

In 1968, Jones ran for Lieutenant Governor of Missouri, winning the Republican primary with 55 percent of the vote. However, he lost the general election to Democrat William S. Morris.

== Later life ==
After leaving office, Jones returned to private life. He was as a trustee of Research Medical Center from 1957 to 1991 and a Chairman of the Board of the Research Medical Center College of Nursing until his retirement in 1994. He was also a founder and Chairman of the Board of CGI Long Distance Company, headquartered in Mission, Kansas. He died on December 17, 1995, at age 71. He was interred at Mount Moriah Cemetery in Kansas City, Missouri.

== Electoral history ==
Missouri's 5th congressional district: 1956 Republican primary
Year	Subject	Votes	%	Opponent	Votes	%	Opponent	Votes	%
1956	Lem T. Jones	7,605	72.71	Kenneth Dickey	1,983	57.22	Elizabeth B. Caulk	872	8.34

Missouri's 5th congressional district: Results 1956
Year	Subject	Party	Votes	%	Opponent	Party	Votes	%
1956	Lem T. Jones	Republican	57,778	42.78	Richard W. Bolling (inc.)	Democratic	77,287	57.22

Missouri's 10th State Senate district: August 1965 special election
Year	Subject	Party	Votes	%	Opponent	Party	Votes	%
1965	Lem T. Jones	Republican	9,895	59.27	John P. Ryan	Democratic	6,800	40.73

Missouri's 10th State Senate district: Results 1966-1974
Year	Subject	Party	Votes	%	Opponent	Party	Votes	%
1966	Lem T. Jones	Republican	18,271	53.02	John A. Biersmith	Democratic	16,189	46.98
1970	Lem T. Jones (inc.)	Republican	22,004	55.12	Reynolds D. Rodgers	Democratic	17,918	44.88
1974	Lem T. Jones (inc.)	Republican	14,967	40.56	Harry Wiggins	Democratic	21,931	59.44

Missouri Lieutenant Governor: 1968 Republican primary
Year	Subject	Votes	%	Opponent	Votes	%	Opponent	Votes	%
1968	Lem T. Jones	115,179	55.91	George R. Hart	69,978	33.97	James Pirtle	20,858	10.13

Missouri Lieutenant Governor: Results 1968
Year	Subject	Party	Votes	%	Opponent	Party	Votes	%
1968	Lem T. Jones	Republican	733,850	43.03	William S. Morris	Democratic	971,684	56.97

Party political offices
Preceded by Jewett M. Fulkerson	Republican nominee for Lieutenant Governor of Missouri; 1968	Succeeded by Bill Phelps
