= Cincinnati, Missouri =

Unincorporated community in Missouri, United States

Coordinates: 39°33′48″N 91°35′40″W

Cincinnati is an unincorporated community in Ralls County, in the U.S. state of Missouri. The community is on the Salt River approximately 3.5 miles downstream from the Mark Twain Lake dam.

== History ==
A post office called Cincinnati was established in 1835, and remained in operation until 1907. The community was named after Cincinnati, Ohio, the native home of a first settler.

== Notable people ==
- James H. Whitecotton (1854–1944), politician
