= Richard Hanson (Missouri politician) =

American politician

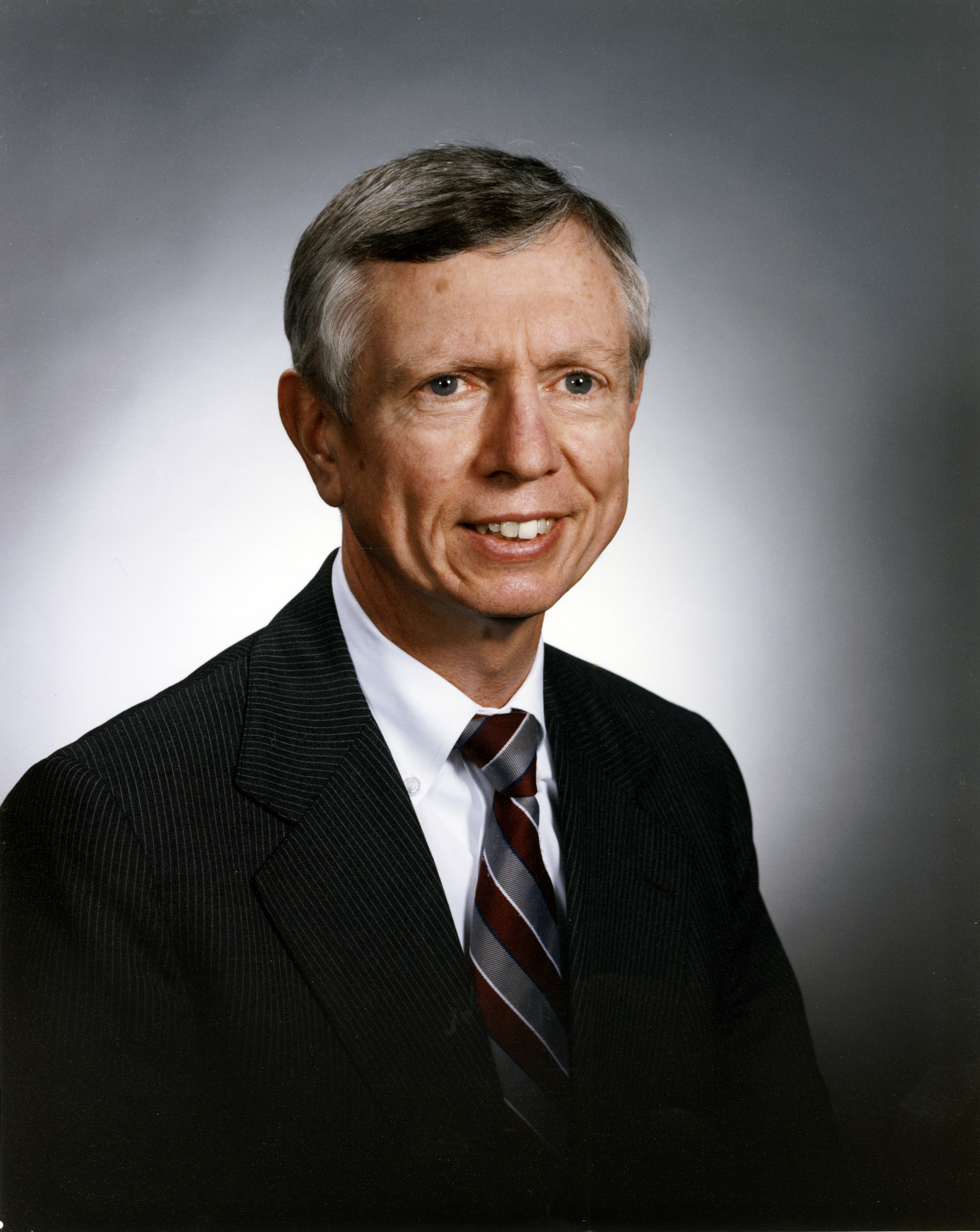

Missouri Secretary of State
- In office 1994–1994
- Governor: Mel Carnahan
- Preceded by: Judith Moriarty
- Succeeded by: Bekki Cook

Richard Hanson (born February 20, 1940) served as secretary of state of Missouri in 1994 following the removal from office of his predecessor, Judith Moriarty.

A Democrat from Cole County, Hanson served on an interim basis in 1994 from the time of Moriarty's removal from office by the Missouri Supreme Court following her impeachment by the Missouri House of Representatives until Governor Mel Carnahan appointed Bekki Cook to serve until the following scheduled election for the office.

Political offices
Preceded by Judith Moriarty	Missouri Secretary of State; 1994	Succeeded by Bekki Cook
