= 1968 Missouri lieutenant gubernatorial election =

- November 5, 1968
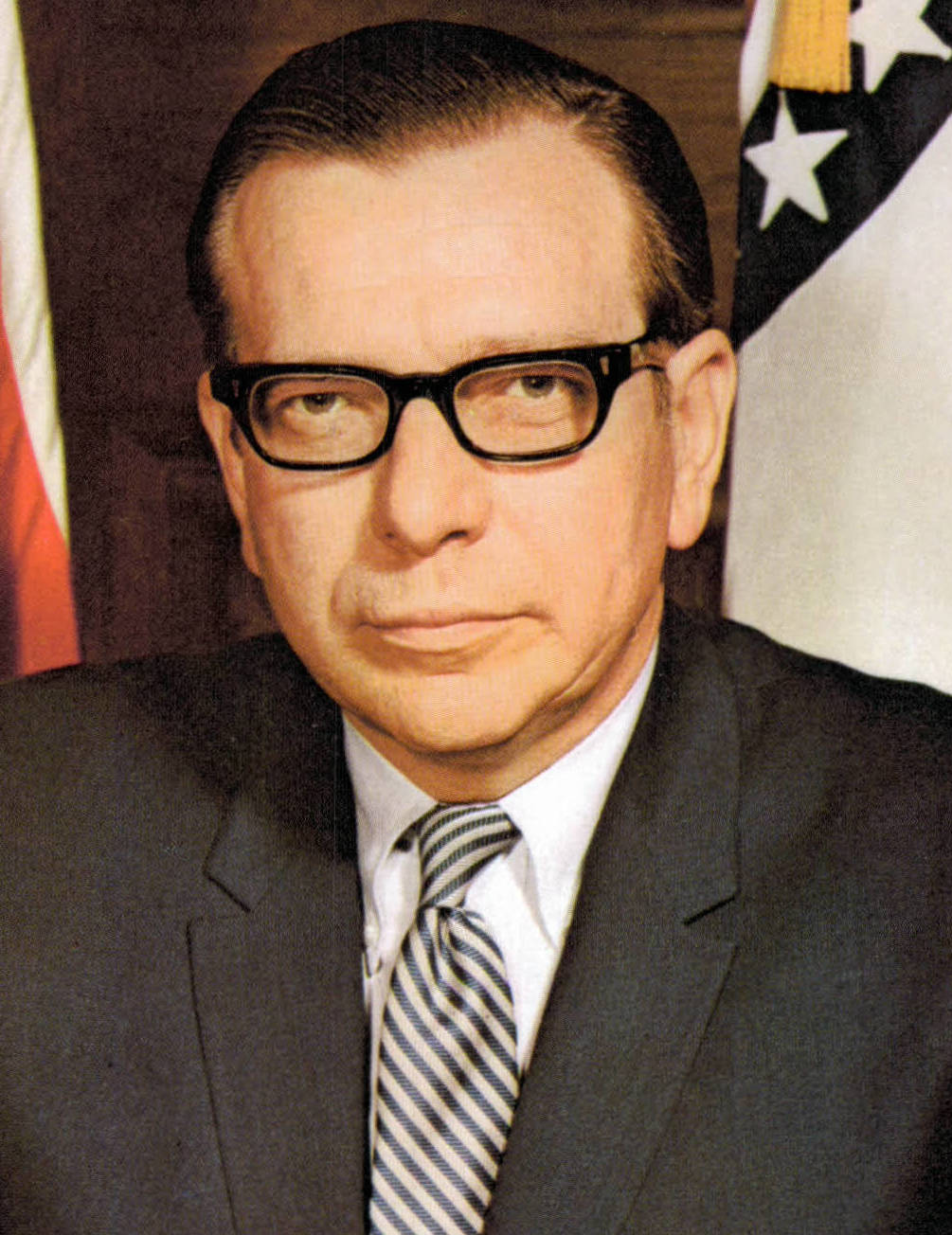

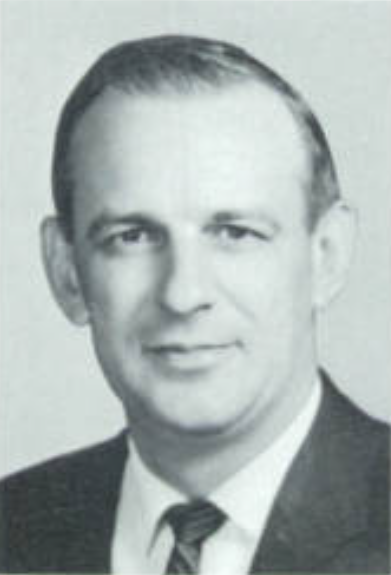
Nominee	William S. Morris	Lem T. Jones Jr.
Party	Democratic	Republican
Popular vote	971,684	733,850
Percentage	56.97%	43.03%
- County results Morris: 50–60% 60–70% 70–80% Jones: 50–60% 60–70% 70–80%
Lieutenant Governor before election
Thomas Eagleton
Democratic
Elected Lieutenant Governor
William S. Morris
Democratic

The 1968 Missouri lieutenant gubernatorial election was held on November 5, 1968. Democratic nominee William S. Morris defeated Republican nominee Lem T. Jones Jr. with 56.97% of the vote.

== Primary elections ==
Primary elections were held on August 6, 1968.

=== Democratic primary ===
==== Candidates ====
- William S. Morris, Public Administrator of Jackson County
- Edward L. Dowd
- John E. Down, State Senator
- James W. "Jim" Shaffer
- Bill Beeny
- Daniel Preston Williams
- Bill Bangert
- Scott Ousley

==== Results ====
Democratic primary results
Party	Candidate	Votes	%
Democratic	William S. Morris	207,680	37.40
Democratic	Edward L. Dowd	189,177	34.07
Democratic	John E. Downs	75,193	13.54
Democratic	James W. "Jim" Shaffer	47,686	8.59
Democratic	Bill Beeny	12,479	2.25
Democratic	Daniel Preston Williams	9,801	1.77
Democratic	Bill Bangert	8,096	1.46
Democratic	Scott Ousley	5,147	0.93
Total votes		555,259	100.00

=== Republican primary ===
==== Candidates ====
- Lem T. Jones Jr., State Senator
- George R. Hart
- James Pirtle

==== Results ====
Republican primary results
Party	Candidate	Votes	%
Republican	Lem T. Jones Jr.	115,179	55.91
Republican	George R. Hart	69,978	33.97
Republican	James Pirtle	20,858	10.13
Total votes		206,015	100.00

== General election ==
=== Candidates ===
- William S. Morris, Democratic
- Lem T. Jones Jr., Republican

=== Results ===
1968 Missouri lieutenant gubernatorial election
Party	Candidate	Votes	%	±%
Democratic	William S. Morris	971,684	56.97%	
Republican	Lem T. Jones Jr.	733,850	43.03%	
Majority		237,834		
Turnout				
Democratic hold		Swing		
