= 1976 Missouri gubernatorial election =

- November 2, 1976
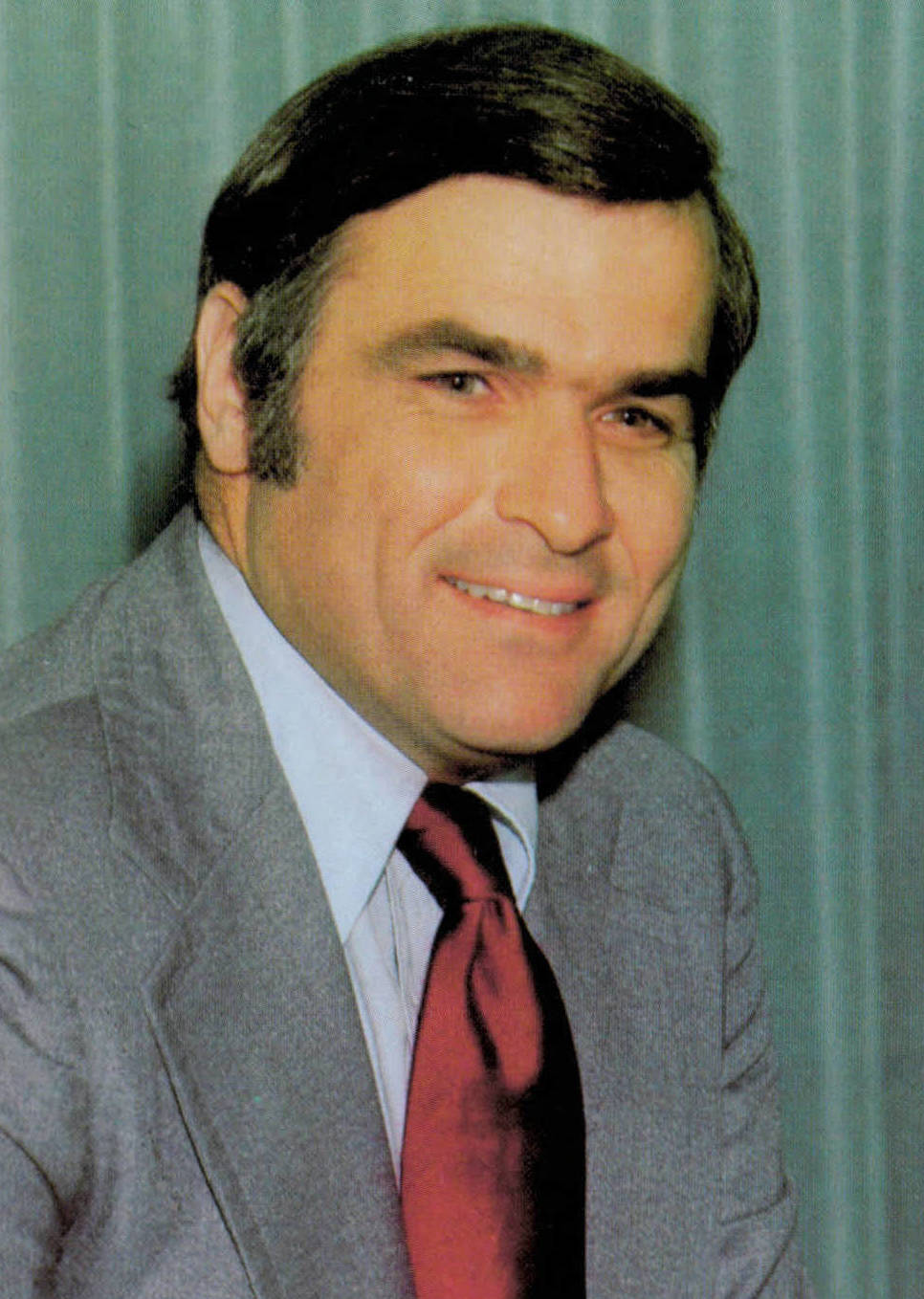

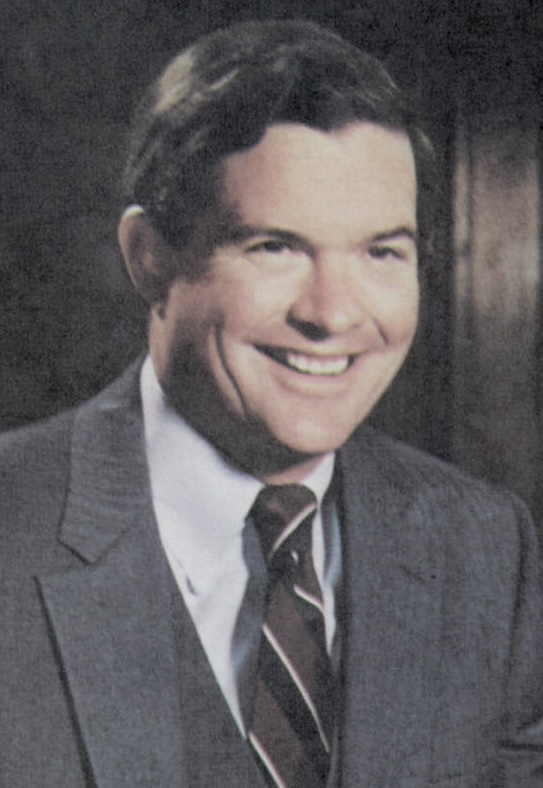
Nominee	Joseph Teasdale	Kit Bond
Party	Democratic	Republican
Popular vote	971,184	958,110
Percentage	50.23%	49.55%
- County results Teasdale: 50–60% 60–70% Bond: 50–60% 60–70%
Governor before election
Kit Bond
Republican
Elected Governor
Joseph Teasdale
Democratic

The 1976 Missouri gubernatorial election was held on November 2, 1976, and resulted in a narrow victory for the Democratic nominee, Joseph P. Teasdale, over the Republican candidate, incumbent Governor Kit Bond, and two other candidates. Teasdale defeated William J. Cason and George D. Weber for the Democratic nomination.

== Results ==
1976 gubernatorial election, Missouri
Party	Candidate	Votes	%	±%
Democratic	Joseph P. Teasdale	971,184	50.23%	+5.59%
Republican	Kit Bond (incumbent)	958,110	49.55%	−5.63%
Nonpartisan	Leon Striler	4,215	0.22%	+0.03%
N/A	write-ins	46	0.00%	±0.00%
Socialist Workers	Helen Savio	20	0.00%	±0.00%
Majority		13,074	0.68%	−9.86%
Turnout		1,933,575	41.34%	+1.45%
Democratic gain from Republican		Swing		
