= James H. Whitecotton =

American politician (1854–1944)

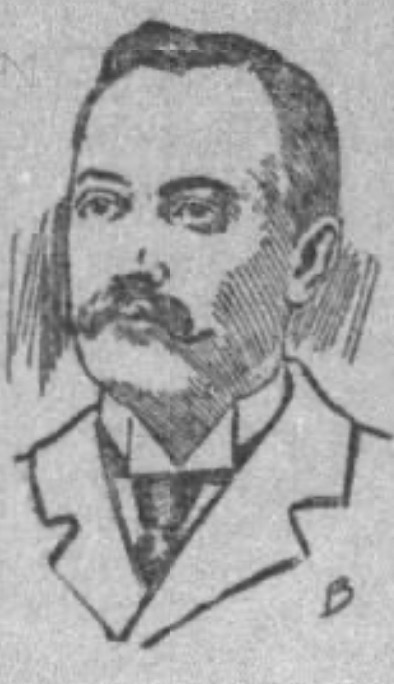

Member of the Missouri Senate from the 13th district
- In office 1921–1932

Speaker of the Missouri House of Representatives
- In office 1901–1904
- Preceded by: William J. Ward
- Succeeded by: David W. Hill

Member of the Missouri House of Representatives from the Monroe County district
- In office 1897–1906
- In office 1907–1908

Personal details
- Born: June 9, 1854 Cincinnati, Missouri, US
- Died: September 11, 1944 (aged 90) Kansas City, Missouri, US
- Party: Democratic
- Relations: William E. Whitecotton (brother)
- Education: Missouri State Teachers College; University of Missouri School of Law
- Occupation: Politician

James H. Whitecotton (June 9, 1854 – September 11, 1944) was an American politician. A Democrat, he was Speaker of the Missouri House of Representatives and later a member of the Missouri Senate.

== Early life and education ==
Whitecotton was born on June 9, 1854, in Cincinnati, Missouri, the son of George A. Whitecotton and Mary Zerelda (née Spalding) Whitecotton. His brother was politician William E. Whitecotton, who served in the Missouri House of Representatives.

Whitecotton was educated at public schools in Ralls County, later attending Rensselaer Academy and the Missouri State Teachers College. He began attending the University of Missouri School of Law in 1885, graduating the following year. He worked as a public schoolteacher from 1872 until his graduation from the University of Missouri.

== Career ==
Whitecotton was a farmer and lawyer, and from 1889 to 1893, was prosecuting attorney of Monroe County. In 1904, he was found guilty of altering a court record of the Supreme Court of Missouri, and as a result was threatened with disbarment by Missouri Attorney General Edward Coke Crow.

Whitecotton was a Democrat. He represented Monroe County in the Missouri House of Representatives from 1897 to 1906, and again in 1907 and 1908; he was Speaker of the House from 1901 to 1904, and at the time was the longest-serving Speaker. He served in the Missouri Senate from 1921 to 1932, representing the 13th district; he was at the time the longest-serving senator from in the district's history. While in the Senate, he was chairman of the Committee on Fees and Salaries.

== Personal life and death ==
On May 24, 1879, Whitecotton married Zora Almanza Wilson; they had four children together. In 1902, he attempted to stop the lynching of Abe Witherup by persuading the mob not to attack him; he failed to persuade them and Witherup was lynched. He died on September 11, 1944, aged 90, in Kansas City, Missouri. He was buried at Walnut Grove Cemetery, in Paris.
