= Jim Kreider =

American politician (born 1955)

68th Speaker of the Missouri House of Representatives
- In office January 3, 2001 – January 8, 2003
- Preceded by: Steve Gaw
- Succeeded by: Catherine Hanaway

Member of the Missouri House of Representatives from the 142nd district
- In office January 6, 1993 – January 8, 2003
- Preceded by: Beth Long
- Succeeded by: Jerry Bough

Personal details
- Born: James Andreas Kreider; June 24, 1955 (age 71) Nuremberg, Germany
- Died: August 1, 2023
- Party: Democratic
- Spouse: Deborah Joan Neil (m. 1976)
- Children: 2
- Education: Southwest Missouri State University (BS)
- Profession: Farmer and rancher

James Andreas Kreider (June 24, 1955 – August 1, 2023) was an American Democratic Party politician who served as Speaker of the Missouri House of Representatives.

Kreider was born in Nuremberg, Germany. He graduated from Nixa Public High School in 1973 and received a degree in agricultural business and economics from Southwest Missouri State University.

He was elected to the Missouri House of Representatives after redistricting in 1992, defeating longtime Republican legislator Don Gann. He was the first Democrat to represent Christian County, Missouri, since 1904 and the first Democrat to represent heavily Republican southwest Missouri since 1955.

He became Speaker pro tempore in 1997 and Speaker in 2001. In 2002, he ran for the 20th district seat in the Missouri Senate, losing to Republican Dan Clemens. To date, Kreider is the last Democrat to serve as Speaker of the Missouri House of Representatives.

Jim Kreider died on August 1, 2023 due to cancer at the age of 68.

Political offices
Preceded by Steve Gaw	Speaker of the Missouri House of Representatives; 2001–2003	Succeeded by Catherine Hanaway
