= Steve Gaw =

American politician

67th Speaker of the Missouri House of Representatives
- In office January 10, 1996 – January 3, 2001
- Preceded by: Bob F. Griffin
- Succeeded by: Jim Kreider

Member of the Missouri House of Representatives from the 22nd district
- In office January 6, 1993 – January 3, 2001
- Succeeded by: Nancy Copenhaver

Personal details
- Born: Robert Steven Gaw; July 7, 1957 (age 69) Moberly, Missouri, U.S.
- Party: Democratic
- Spouse: Fannie Bowdish
- Education: Northeast Missouri State University (BS); University of Missouri (JD)

Robert Steven Gaw (born July 7, 1957) is Democratic Party politician who served as Speaker of the Missouri House of Representatives.

== Personal information ==
Gaw grew up in Moberly, Missouri where he graduated from high school in 1974. He received a bachelor's degree from Truman State University in 1978, where he majored in physics. He received a Juris Doctor degree from the University of Missouri in 1981. He is married to Fannie Bowdish Gaw.

== Professional Experience ==
Steve Gaw has had the following professional experience:

- Law Offices of Schirmer, Suter, and Gaw, Partner
- Formerly served as a city attorney

== Organizations ==
Steve Gaw has been a member of the following organizations:

- American Saddle Horse Association
- Moberly Area Chamber of Commerce, Board of Directors
- Governmental Affairs Council, former Vice-president
- American Horse Show Association
- Moberly Rotary Club
- American Diabetes Society, Moberly Chapter former Board Member
- Missouri Bar
- KIDS COUNT Advisory Committee
- Westsiders Gospel Quartet
- National Guard Association, 'Charles Dick Medal of Merit,' 1995
- Missouri Bar Association, 'Award for Legislative Service,' 1995

== Politics ==
He was elected to the Missouri House of Representatives representing Moberly in 1992 and was Speaker from 1996 to 2000. In 2000 he lost to Matt Blunt in a bid for the position of Missouri Secretary of State. He was on the Missouri Public Service Commission from 2001 to 2007, serving as chairman from 2003 to 2005. In 2008 he lost a primary bid for the Ninth U.S. Congressional District.

=== Political experience ===
Steve Gaw has had the following political experience:

- Candidate, United States House of Representatives, District 9, 2008
- Candidate, Secretary of State, Missouri, 2000
- Missouri Democratic Party
- Speaker of the House, Missouri

Party political offices
Preceded by Bekki Cook	Democratic nominee for Secretary of State of Missouri; 2000	Succeeded by Robin Carnahan
Political offices
Preceded by Bob F. Griffin	Speaker of the Missouri House of Representatives; 1996– 2000	Succeeded by Jim Kreider
