= Fairfield, Missouri =

- Township
- Interactive map of Fairfield, Missouri
- Coordinates: 38°09′14.4″N 93°23′36.9″W
- Country: United States
- State: Missouri
- County: Benton

Area
  - Total: 36.7 sq mi (95.0 km^{2})
  - Land: 36.7 sq mi (95.0 km^{2})
  - Water: 0.039 sq mi (0.1 km^{2})
- Elevation: 705 ft (215 m)

Population (2000)
  - Total: 194
  - Density: 5.2/sq mi (2/km^{2})
- Time zone: UTC-6 (Central (CST))
  - Summer (DST): UTC-5 (CDT)
- FIPS code: 29-23302
- GNIS feature ID: 0717733

Fairfield is a former unincorporated community in Benton County, Missouri, USA. Fairfield and much of its surrounding township, Alexander, is now covered by water, as part of the Harry S. Truman Dam and Reservoir. It was located about seven miles south of Warsaw just west of Route 83. The Fairfield Public Use Area is on the shore near the location of the former community.

One of the earliest residents of Fairfield was Judge George T. Alexander, a pioneer in Missouri since 1816, who built the town's covered bridge, and operated its mill. He arrived in Fairfield in 1832 and purchased an Indian village for $60. He obtained a ferry license for the Pomme de Terre River at that spot in 1836 and was elected as a county judge. The township was named for Alexander.

Fairfield in 1962 still had the remains of the old mill and the pillars from the old covered bridge. Fairfield had a post office with the town bar in the same building, side by side. There also was an old country church on the north end of town and a bait shop in the center of town with a walkway to the banks of the river bank and the docks that provided john boat rentals. There was a small local country store with food, hardware and clothing, as well as a gasoline station with a repair garage.

== Famous people from Fairfield ==
- James M. Scott, Senior Olympian, inventor
- Judith Moriarty, former Missouri Secretary of State
