= Bob F. Griffin =

American politician (1935–2021)

Speaker of the Missouri House of Representatives
- In office January 7, 1981 – January 10, 1996
- Preceded by: Ken Rothman
- Succeeded by: Steve Gaw

Member of the Missouri House of Representatives from the 6th (10th; 1973–1993) (85th; 1971–1973) district
- In office January 6, 1971 – January 31, 1996
- Preceded by: Robert H. Frost
- Succeeded by: Randall Relford

Personal details
- Born: August 15, 1935 Braymer, Missouri, U.S.
- Died: July 7, 2021 (aged 85) Columbia, Missouri, U.S.
- Party: Democratic

Bob F. Griffin (August 15, 1935 – July 7, 2021) was an American politician who served in the Missouri House of Representatives from 1971 to 1996 and as Speaker of the Missouri House of Representatives from 1981 to 1996, longer than any other speaker in state history.

Griffin was convicted on federal corruption charges in 1998 and was sentenced to forty eight months in prison.

== Early life ==
Griffin was born in Braymer, Missouri, and received a B.S. in Business Administration in 1957 and his law degree in 1958 from the University of Missouri. He served a stint in the U.S. Air Force judge advocate general corps where he rose to the rank of captain. In 1962 he was elected prosecuting attorney of Clinton County, Missouri, and opened a private law practice in Cameron, Missouri, and also served with the Kansas City law firm of Linde Thompson Fairchild Kohn and Vandyke. He was re-elected in 1966.

In 1970 he was elected as a Democrat to the House from the 10th District which included portions of Clay County, Missouri, Clinton, DeKalb County, Missouri, and Caldwell County, Missouri.

== Speaker ==
From 1977 to 1980 he was speaker pro tempore. Griffin, noted for his genial demeanor, rose to the Speaker status in 1981—the first speaker from western Missouri since 1955. He increased the number of committees from 36 to 45 and installed several chairmen from western Missouri and Kansas City, Missouri. Griffin would steer numerous projects to western Missouri including the Western Missouri Correctional Center in his hometown in Cameron (located on Pence Rd. on the edge of Cameron).

In 1989 he was accused of steering business to his new Kansas City law firm of Kraft Fridkin and Ryhne. He was challenged for the Speaker position by St. Louis, Missouri, Democrat Tony Ribaudo.

== Corruption charges ==
In January 1992 after endorsing a 6 percent gasoline tax to improve the state highway system, Griffin was accused of meeting with members of the Heavy Constructors Association of Kansas City and the Associated General Contractors of Missouri at a Jefferson City, Missouri, hotel where he told them they should hire Cathryn Simmons to lobby for the tax. The contractors paid Simmons $200,000, who reportedly paid Griffin $5,000. After the proposed tax passed the House, Simmons was said to have paid Griffin another $5,000.

In August 1992 Simmons was working for Health Midwest when she asked Griffin to remove Bill Skaggs from a committee overseeing the proposed construction of a hospital in eastern Jackson County, Missouri, which Health Midwest opposed. After Skaggs was removed and the hospital cancelled, Simmons was said to have paid Griffin $10,000.

In 1993 Griffin was arrested on a DWI charge.

After the Great Flood of 1993 Griffin pushed legislation to repair Missouri's roads. Griffin again pushed the construction companies to hire Simmons, this time for $90,000. Simmons then hired Griffin's son for $5,000.

In March 1994 Griffin was alleged to receive a $21,000 check from Simmons. Griffin defended the payment by saying he was doing private law work for Simmons.

=== Resignation and conviction ===
In 1994 Griffin worked with Simmons to get Sahara Casino built in Parkville, Missouri, which would require a referendum to be passed to allow slot machines. It was alleged Griffin was pushing for Simmons to receive a 20 percent stake in the casino with a secret 1 percent stake for Griffin. The casino was never built and The Kansas City Star published articles on Griffin's actions prompting state and federal prosecutors to review Griffin's activities.

On January 26, 1996, Griffin tendered his resignation effective January 31, 1996. He was indicted on October 31, 1996 on six bribery violations, two mail fraud violations, and one violation of the Racketeer Influenced and Corrupt Organizations Act. In the first trial he was found innocent on three charges and the jury could not reach a verdict on six other charges including the RICO charge.

In the second trial, Simmons testified against him. Griffin pleaded guilty on the second day of the second trial, to two counts of bribery and mail fraud in conjunction with the original highway scheme. He was sentenced to 48 months in prison, a $7,500 fine, and a $100 special penalty assessment.

In January 2001 President Bill Clinton commuted (or lessened) what was left of his sentence without negating his conviction.

He died on July 7, 2021, in Columbia, Missouri, at age 85.

Political offices
Preceded by Ken Rothman	Speaker of the Missouri House of Representatives; 1981– 1996	Succeeded by Steve Gaw
