= William J. Cason =

American politician

Member of the Missouri Senate from the 31st district
- In office 1960–1976

Personal details
- Born: October 1, 1924 Higginsville, Missouri
- Died: January 4, 2017 (aged 92) Clinton, Missouri
- Party: Democratic
- Education: University of Missouri
- Occupation: attorney

William J. Cason (October 1, 1924 – January 4, 2017) was an American politician who served in the Missouri State Senate. He was born in Higginsville, Missouri and attended the University of Missouri in Columbia, studying law (LLB 1951). Cason was admitted to the Missouri bar in 1951. He served in the Missouri State Senate for the 31st district (Henry County) from 1960 to 1976. He was a member of the Democratic Party. He would become the President Pro Tempore of the Senate. In 1976, he ran for the Democratic nomination for Governor, but lost in an upset to Kansas City lawyer and eventual winner Joseph Teasdale.

== Issues in state senate ==
- Civil rights
- Environmental protection
- Women's rights
