= Judith Moriarty =

American politician (born 1942)

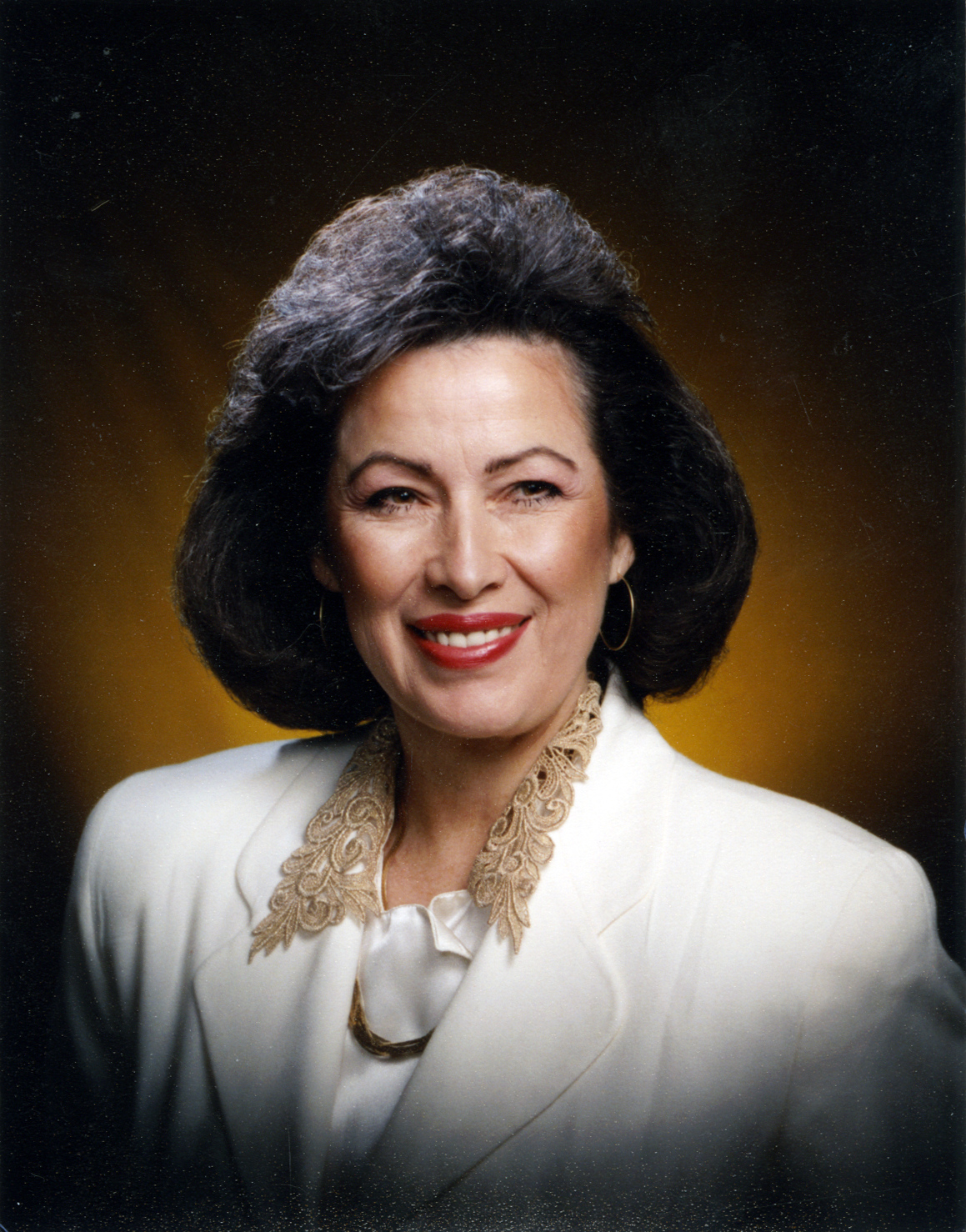
- Moriarty in 1992

34th Missouri Secretary of State
- In office January 11, 1993 – December 12, 1994
- Governor: Mel Carnahan
- Preceded by: Roy Blunt
- Succeeded by: Richard Hanson

Personal details
- Born: February 2, 1942 (age 84) Fairfield, Missouri, U.S.
- Party: Libertarian (since 2005)
- Other political affiliations: Democratic (before 2005)

Judith K. Moriarty (born February 2, 1942) is an American politician from Missouri. She was the first woman to serve as Missouri Secretary of State. She was impeached in 1994 for conduct issues, and forced from office. She was a member of the Democratic Party, until 2005, switching to the Libertarian Party.

== Early life ==
Moriarty was born Judith Spry in Fairfield, Missouri, the daughter of Earl and Blanch (McDavitt) Spry. She had four sisters and one brother. She graduated from high school in Warsaw, Missouri, and attended Central Missouri State University in Warrensburg.

Moriarty settled in Sedalia, Missouri, and became active in state and local politics. She was appointed to run the local license fee office by Governor Joe Teasdale in 1977. In 1982, Moriarty was elected county clerk of Pettis County. She was re-elected in 1986 and 1990.

== Secretary of state ==
In 1992, Moriarty ran for Missouri Secretary of State. Her campaign was managed by former Governor Teasdale. She won a four way primary, spending less than $20,000. She campaigned on increasing voter registration in the state. Moriarty was elected by about 30,000 votes. She was sworn into office January 11, 1993, becoming the first woman to hold that position. She caused a stir early in her term when she announced that the Official Manual State of Missouri, published by the secretary of state and often referred to as the "Blue Book" because of its traditional blue cover, would instead be published with a mauve cover as a tribute to the role of women in Missouri politics. During her tenure, she pushed for legislation that allowed voter registration by postcard.

== Impeachment ==
In 1994, Moriarty was the subject of investigations due to financial practices, such as making long distance calls to family members. She also faced charges of cronyism, improper use of resources, and harassment of employees. Moriarty was also accused of using her position as secretary of state to help her son file for political office after the deadline had passed by back-dating a form issued by her office. In spite of calls for her resignation, Moriarty refused to resign, proclaiming her innocence, and saying that she was being railroaded by a disgruntled employee. Consequently, Governor Mel Carnahan called for a special session on September 22, 1994, so that the Missouri House of Representatives could consider impeaching Moriarty. They voted to impeach Moriarty on October 6, 1994, on a bipartisan vote. During her suspension, she was replaced by Richard Hanson. In spite of this, Moriarty refused to leave, and returned to her office the next day. She was suspended on October 12. Her impeachment trial was held before the Missouri Supreme Court. On December 12, 1994, the court voted unanimously that Moriarty had committed impeachable offenses, forcing her from the office. Carnahan appointed Bekki Cook as Moriarty's successor.

== Post-impeachment career ==
She considered a comeback bid in 1996 for Secretary of State, but did not go through with it. In 1998, she ran for the Democratic nomination for the Pettis County Recorder of Deeds. In 2002, Moriarty attempted a political comeback, running for the Missouri House of Representatives seat representing the Sedalia area but was defeated in the November election.

In 2005, she left the Democratic Party and aligned with the Libertarian Party. Moriarty reportedly considered running for governor in 2008, but did not meet the filing deadline.

Party political offices
Preceded by James J. Askew	Democratic nominee for Secretary of State of Missouri; 1992	Succeeded by Bekki Cook
Political offices
Preceded by Roy Blunt	Missouri Secretary of State; 1993–1994	Succeeded by Richard Hanson
