= Leo McKamey =

American politician

Member of the Missouri House of Representatives
- Incumbent
- Assumed office 1973
- Constituency: 36th district

Personal details
- Born: 1915 St. Louis, Missouri, US
- Died: 2009 (aged 93–94)
- Party: Democratic
- Spouse: Lucille Moore
- Children: 2
- Occupation: labor organization manager

Leo McKamey (June 13, 1915 - 2009) was an American Democratic politician who served in the Missouri House of Representatives. He was born in St. Louis, Missouri, and was educated at Vashon High School, Stowe Teachers College, Lincoln University, and Chicago University. In 1945, he married Lucille Moore in Kansas City, Missouri. He worked at several different jobs and briefly served in the United States Army.
