= Bekki Cook =

American politician

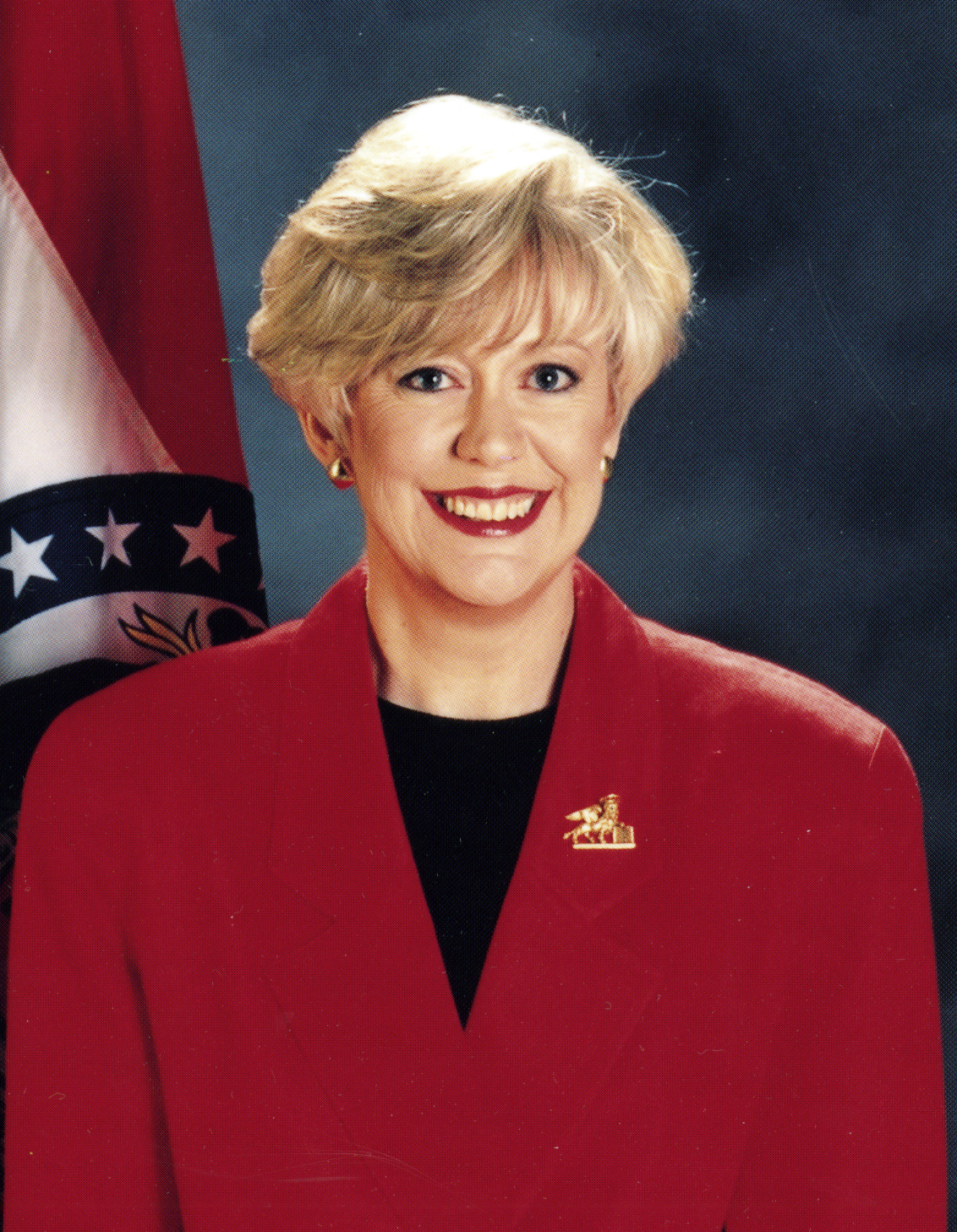

36th Missouri Secretary of State
- In office December 1994 – January 2001
- Appointed by: Mel Carnahan
- Governor: Mel Carnahan; Roger Wilson
- Preceded by: Richard Hanson
- Succeeded by: Matt Blunt

Personal details
- Born: Rebecca McDowell Cook; July 18, 1950 (age 76)
- Party: Democratic
- Education: University of Missouri

Rebecca McDowell "Bekki" Cook (July 18, 1950) is an American politician from Missouri, United States. She served as the 36th Missouri Secretary of State from December 1994 to January 2001.

Cook was raised in Jackson, Missouri, and attended public schools. She graduated from the University of Missouri in 1972 with a degree in political science. She received her J.D. degree from the University of Missouri in 1975 and practiced law in Cape Girardeau.

While working in private law practice, Cook was appointed to the Missouri State Board of Education by Governor John Ashcroft. She was subsequently re-appointed by Governor Mel Carnahan. In December 1994, Carnahan appointed Cook as Missouri's Secretary of State. Cook succeeded Judi Moriarty who had been impeached and removed from office following a scandal.

In 1996, Cook was elected to a full term as Secretary of State. She chose not to seek re-election in 2000. In 2004, Cook ran for Lieutenant Governor of Missouri and won a contested primary to become the Democratic nominee. However, she was defeated by less than 1% of the vote in the general election by Republican Peter Kinder who is also from Cape Girardeau County, Missouri.

== Personal life ==
Cook is married to Cape Girardeau attorney John Larkin Cook. They have two children.

Party political offices
Preceded by Judith Moriarty	Democratic nominee for Secretary of State of Missouri; 1996	Succeeded by Steve Gaw
Preceded by Joe Maxwell	Democratic nominee for Lieutenant Governor of Missouri; 2004	Succeeded by Sam Page
Political offices
Preceded by Richard Hanson	Missouri Secretary of State; 1994–2001	Succeeded by Matt Blunt
