= Bill Phelps =

American politician and lawyer (1934–2019)

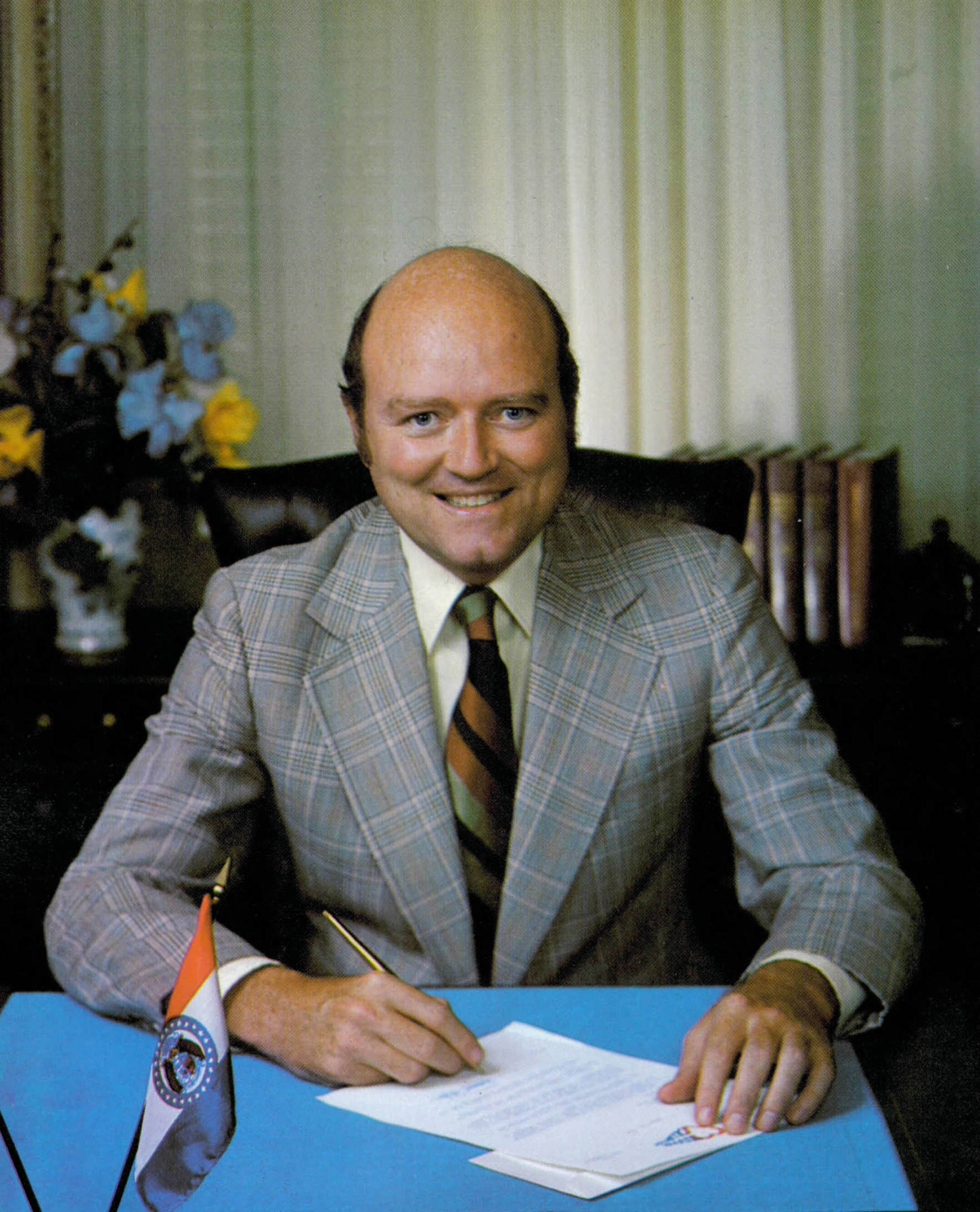
- Phelps in 1975

40th Lieutenant Governor of Missouri
- In office January 8, 1973 – January 12, 1981
- Governor: Kit Bond; Joseph P. Teasdale
- Preceded by: William S. Morris
- Succeeded by: Ken Rothman

20th Chair of the National Lieutenant Governors Association
- In office 1979–1980
- Preceded by: Thomas P. O'Neill III
- Succeeded by: Chuck Robb

Personal details
- Born: William Cunningham Phelps; April 5, 1934 Nevada, Missouri, U.S.
- Died: March 19, 2019 (aged 84) Houston, Texas, U.S.
- Party: Republican
- Spouse: Joanne

William Cunningham Phelps (April 5, 1934 – March 19, 2019) was an American Republican politician and lawyer from Missouri. Phelps was born and raised in Nevada, Missouri.

== Biography ==
Phelps attended the University of Missouri and graduated with a degree in economics in 1956 and a law degree in 1959. Following graduation he began practicing law with a Kansas City firm.

Phelps was elected to the Missouri House of Representatives from the Kansas City area in 1960 and was re-elected five times. In 1972, he was elected the 40th Lieutenant Governor of Missouri and was re-elected in 1976. Phelps campaigned on a pledge to be Missouri's first "full time" Lieutenant Governor and upon his election to that office, he gave up the practice of law. In 1980 Phelps was an unsuccessful candidate for the Republican nomination for Governor of Missouri. He lost the Republican primary election to former Governor Kit Bond.

After a sixteen-year absence from public life, in 1996 Phelps ran for Congress in Missouri's 4th congressional district. Phelps won the primary, but was defeated in November by the incumbent, Ike Skelton. Phelps worked as the national spokesman for Americans for Fair Tax, a group that advocates replacing the income tax with a national sales tax.

Phelps died in Houston, Texas following a short illness. He was 84.

Party political offices
Preceded by Lem T. Jones Jr.	Republican nominee for Lieutenant Governor of Missouri; 1972, 1976	Succeeded by Roy Blunt
Political offices
Preceded by William S. Morris	Lieutenant Governor of Missouri; 1973–1981	Succeeded by Ken Rothman
