= William S. Morris =

American politician

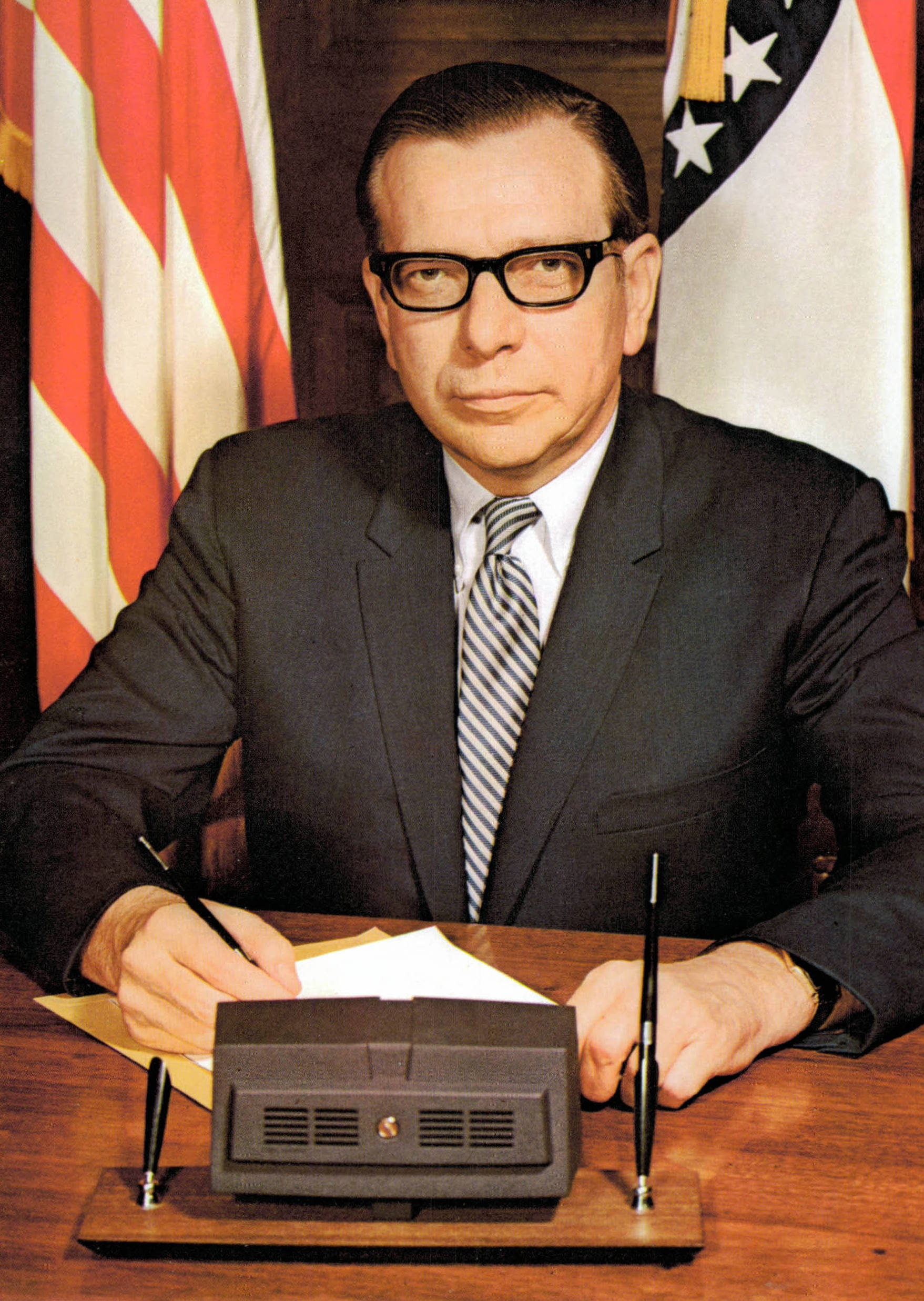
- Morris in 1969

39th Lieutenant Governor of Missouri
- In office January 1969 – January 1973
- Governor: Warren E. Hearnes
- Preceded by: Thomas Eagleton
- Succeeded by: Bill Phelps

Personal details
- Born: November 8, 1919 Higginsville, Missouri, U.S.
- Died: March 4, 1975 (aged 55)
- Party: Democratic

Military service
- Allegiance: United States
- Branch/service: United States Army
- Rank: Major
- Battles/wars: World War II
- Awards: Bronze Star Medal; Silver Star Medal; Air Medal

William S. Morris (November 8, 1919 – March 4, 1975) was an American politician who served as the 39th Lieutenant Governor of Missouri. He was a member of the Democratic Party.

== Biography ==
Morris was born in Higginsville, Missouri, to mother Elizabeth Jung and father Cyrus Morris, with brothers Conrad "Jack" and Donald and sisters Mildred and Eunice. Morris went on to serve in the U.S. Army during World War II. He was awarded the Bronze Star, the Silver Star and the Air Medal. He was discharged at the rank of Major. Following his discharge from the Army, he returned to Missouri and began working in the mail room of the former Union National Bank in Kansas City, Missouri and attended the University of Kansas City (now UMKC) School of Law at night, earning a law degree. He rose to the position of Vice-President in charge of the Trust Division at the bank before leaving to become the manager of the Phillips family properties located throughout the United States, one of which was the Phillips Hotel in downtown Kansas City. He was a partner in the Kansas City law firm of Morris & Foust. He was an owner of the Kansas City Area Transportation Authority prior to its sale to the City of Kansas City.

Morris founded the Kansas City Blues Hockey Club in 1967 as the top minor-league affiliate of the National Hockey League's St. Louis Blues and worked tirelessly to bring NHL hockey to Kansas City. Morris headed up one of four local groups who placed bids for a Kansas City franchise in 1972 while also pursuing the Democratic nomination for Missouri governor. Morris ultimately was not awarded the NHL team and lost the primary race to Edward Dowd of St. Louis. Dowd was defeated by Republican Christopher Bond in the November general election. (Icing on the Plains: The Rough Ride of Kansas City's NHL Scouts, pp. 22–23)

He was appointed Public Administrator of Jackson County, Missouri by former Missouri Governor John M. Dalton. Morris served as the 39th Lieutenant Governor of Missouri from January 1969 to January 1973 under Governor Warren Hearnes.

Morris was a Methodist and a member of the Veterans of Foreign Wars, the Freemasons, and the Shriners.

Morris suffered a heart attack in November 1974. On January 27, 1975, Morris underwent open heart surgery at St. Luke's Hospital in Kansas City but never recovered. (p. 138)

Morris was married to the former Lucile Albers, also of Higginsville, Missouri and had one daughter, Lisa.

Party political offices
| Preceded by Thomas Eagleton | Democratic nominee for Lieutenant Governor of Missouri; 1968 | Succeeded by Jack J. Schramm |
Political offices
| Preceded by Thomas Eagleton | Lieutenant Governor of Missouri; 1969–1973 | Succeeded by Bill Phelps |
