= List of speakers of the Missouri House of Representatives =

Speakers of the Missouri House of Representatives are (listed by year they assumed office):

- 1820 James Caldwell Democratic-Republican - St. Genevieve
- 1821 Henry S. Geyer Democratic-Republican - St. Louis
- 1826 Alexander Stuart Democratic-Republican - St. Louis
- 1828 John Thornton D - Clay
- 1832 Thomas Reynolds D - Howard
- 1834 John Jameson D - Callaway
- 1838 Thomas H. Harvey D - Saline
- 1840 Sterling Price D - Chariton
- 1844 Claiborne F. Jackson D - Saline
- 1848 Alexander M. Robinson D - Platte
- 1850 Nathaniel W. Watkins D - Scott
- 1852 Reuben Shelby D - Perry
- 1854 William Newland Whig - Ralls
- 1856 Robert C. Harrison Whig - Cooper
- 1857 James Chiles D - Jackson
- 1858 John T. Coffee D - Dade
- 1860 Christian Kribben D - St. Louis
- 1860 John McAfee D - Shelby
- 1862 L. C. Marvin R - Henry
- 1864 Walter L. Lovelace R - Montgomery
- 1865 Andrew J. Harlan R - Andrew
- 1869 John C. Orrick R - St. Charles
- 1871 Robert P.C. Wilson D - Platte
- 1873 Mortimer McIlhaney D - Audrain
- 1875 Banton G. Boone D - Henry
- 1877 John F. Williams D - Macon
- 1879 J. Edwin Belch D - Cole
- 1881 Thomas P. Bashaw D - Monroe
- 1883 Joseph S. Richardson D - Stoddard
- 1885 John M. Wood D - Clark
- 1887 Joshua W. Alexander D - Daviess
- 1889 Joseph J. Russell D - Mississippi
- 1891 Wilbur F. Tuttle D - Pettis
- 1893 Thomas W. Mabrey D - Ripley
- 1895 B.F. Russell R - Crawford
- 1897 John W. Farris D - Laclede
- 1899 William J. Ward D - Stoddard
- 1901 James H. Whitecotton D - Monroe
- 1905 David W. Hill R - Butler
- 1907 J.M. Atkinson D - Ripley
- 1909 Alfred A. Speer R - Cole
- 1911 John T. Barker D - Carroll
- 1913 James H. Hull D - Platte
- 1915 James P. Boyd D - Monroe
- 1917 Drake Watson D - Ralls
- 1919 S. F. O'Fallon R - Holt
- 1923 Oak Hunter D - Randolph
- 1925 Jones H. Parker R - St. Louis
- 1927 E.H. Winter R - Warren
- 1929 Jones H. Parker R - St. Louis
- 1931 Eugene W. Nelson D - Marion
- 1933 Willis H. Meredith D - Butler
- 1935 John G. Christy D - Jefferson
- 1941 Morris E. Osborn D - Shelby
- 1943 Howard Elliott R - St. Louis
- 1947 Murray E. Thompson R - Webster
- 1949 Roy Hamlin D - Marion
- 1953 L. A. Vonderschmidt R - Holt
- 1954 Richard M. Webster R - Jasper
- 1955 Roy Hamlin D - Marion
- 1959 Richard H. Ichord D - Texas
- 1961 Thomas D. Graham D - Cole
- 1967 James E. Godfrey D - St. Louis
- 1973 Richard J. Rabbitt D - St. Louis
- 1977 Kenneth J. Rothman D - St. Louis
- 1981 Bob F. Griffin D - Clinton
- 1996 Steve Gaw D - Randolph
- 2001 Jim Kreider D - Christian
- 2003 Catherine Hanaway R - St. Louis
- 2005 Rod Jetton R - Bollinger
- 2009 Ron Richard R - Jasper
- 2011 Steven Tilley R - Perry
- 2012 Tim Jones R - St. Louis
- 2015 John Diehl R - St. Louis
- 2015 Todd Richardson R - Butler
- 2019 Elijah Haahr R - Greene
- 2021 Rob Vescovo R - Jefferson
- 2023 Dean Plocher R – St. Louis
- 2025 Jonathan Patterson R – Lee's Summit

== See also ==
- List of Missouri General Assemblies
