= List of Missouri secretaries of state =

Secretary of State of Missouri
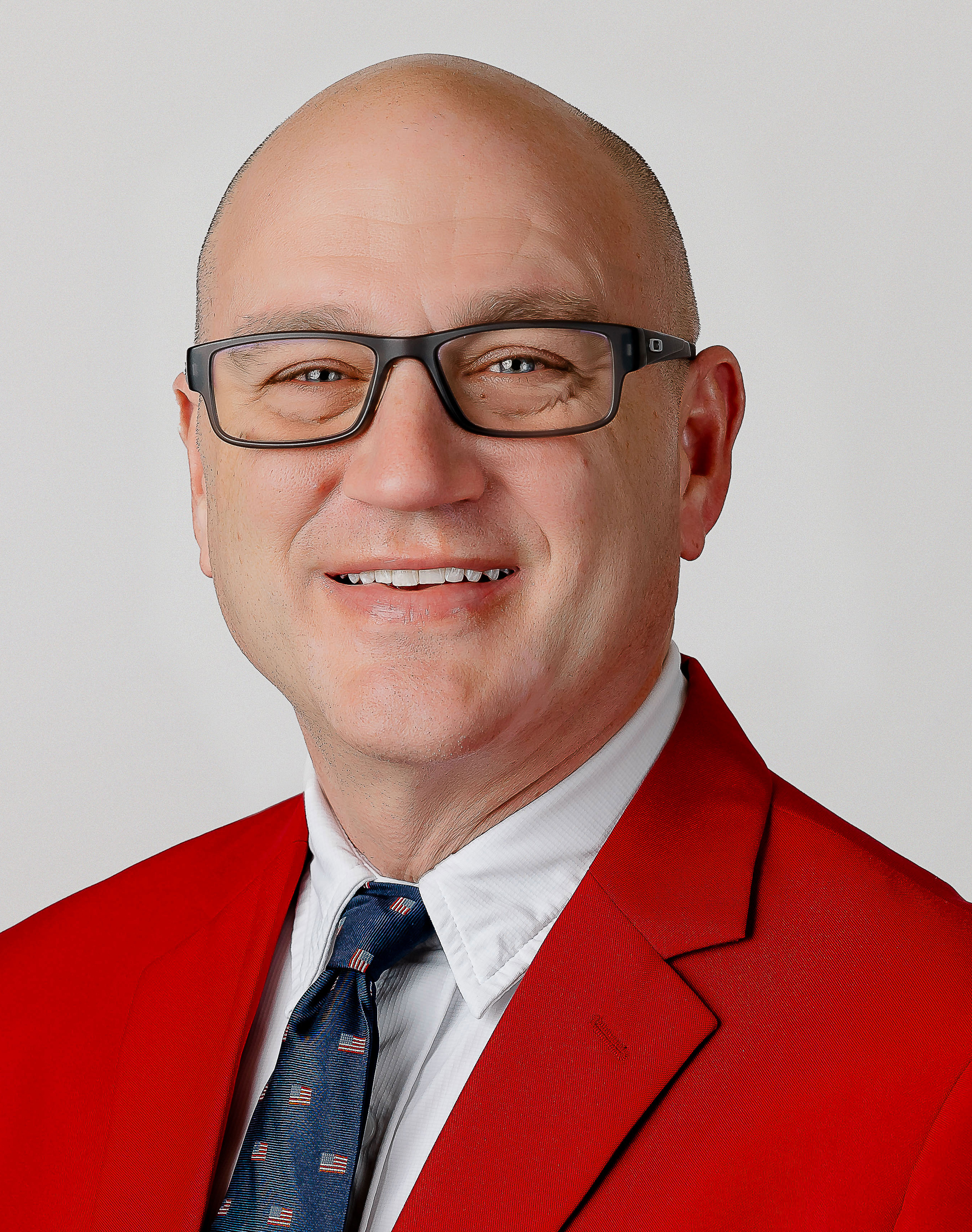
- Incumbent; Denny Hoskins since January 13, 2025
- Term length: 4 years, no term limits
- Succession: Fourth
- Salary: $107,256
- Website: https://www.sos.mo.gov/

The people below have served as the secretary of state of the U.S. state of Missouri.

== List ==
#	Image	Name	Party	Term	Home county
1		Joshua Barton	Democratic-Republican	1820–1821	St. Louis
2		William Grymes Pettus	Democratic-Republican	1821–1824	St. Charles
3		Hamilton Rowan Gamble	Democratic-Republican	1824–1826	St. Louis
4		Spencer Darwin Pettis	Democratic	1826–1828	St. Louis
5		Priestly H. McBride	Democratic	1829–1830	Boone
6		John C. Edwards	Democratic	1830–1835	Cole
7		Henry Shurlds	Democratic	1835–1837	Washington
8		John C. Edwards	Democratic	1837	Cole (now Callaway)
9		Peter Garland Glover	Democratic	1837–1839	Callaway
10		James Lawerence Minor	Democratic	1839–1845	Marion
11		Faulkland Heard Martin	Democratic	1845–1849	Jefferson
12		Ephraim Brevard Ewing	Democratic	1849–1853	Ray
13		John M. Richardson	Democratic	1853–1857	Greene
14		Benjamin Franklin Massey	Democratic	1857–1861	Jasper
15		Mordecai Oliver	Unionist	1861–1865	Greene
16		Francis A. Rodman	Republican	1865–1871	Buchanan
17		Eugene F. Weigel	Democratic	1871–1875	St. Louis
18		Michael Knowles McGrath	Democratic	1875–1889	St. Louis
19		Alexander A. Lesueur	Democratic	1889–1901	Lafayette
20		Sam Baker Cook	Democratic	1901–1905	Audrain
21		John Ephraim Swanger	Republican	1905–1909	Sullivan
22		Cornelius Roach	Democratic	1909–1917	Jasper
23		John Leo Sullivan	Democratic	1917–1921	Pettis
24		Charles U. Becker	Republican	1921–1933	Polk
25		Dwight H. Brown	Democratic	1933–1944	Butler
26		Gregory C. Stockard	Republican	1944–1945	Cole (now Callaway)
27		Wilson Bell	Democratic	1945–1947	Washington
28		Edgar C. Nelson	Democratic	1947–1949	Cooper
29		Walter H. Toberman	Democratic	1949–1960	St. Louis
30		Robert W. Crawford	Democratic	1960–1961	Vernon
31		Warren E. Hearnes	Democratic	1961–1965	Mississippi
32		James Kirkpatrick	Democratic	1965–1985	Henry; Barton; Cole (now Callaway)
33		Roy Blunt	Republican	1985–1993	Greene
34		Judith Moriarty	Democratic	1993–1994	Pettis
35		Richard Hanson	Democratic	1994	Cole (now Callaway)
36		Rebecca McDowell Cook	Democratic	1994–2001	Cape Girardeau
37		Matt Blunt	Republican	2001–2005	Greene
38		Robin Carnahan	Democratic	2005–2013	Phelps
39		Jason Kander	Democratic	2013–2017	Jackson
40		Jay Ashcroft	Republican	2017–2025	Cole
41		Denny Hoskins	Republican	2025–present	Cole
