= History of the Jews in Milwaukee =

The history of Jews in Milwaukee began in the early 1840s with the arrival of Jewish immigrants from German-speaking states and the Austro-Hungarian empire. Throughout the 19th century, Milwaukee was the hub of Wisconsin's Jewish population with 80% of the state's Jews living there. As of 2011, it is home to 25,800 Jewish people, or 78% of Jews in Wisconsin, and is the 42nd largest Jewish community in the United States.

== 19th Century ==
Congregation Emanu-El B'ne Jeshurun, the first synagogue in Wisconsin, was founded as Congregation Imanu-Al in Milwaukee in 1850. Two other congregations, Ahavath Emunah (1854) and Anshe Emeth (1855) would later merge into it. During the 1860s, the majority of services were conducted in German with a few rare ones held in English. Plenty of the Jewish immigrants were atheists or secular: in 1859, only 50% of the families in Milwaukee belonged to the congregation. Most of the German Jews in Milwaukee practiced Reform Judaism, while the Jews from Eastern Europe practiced Orthodox Judaism.

Due to an influx of immigrants from Central Europe fleeing discrimination, poverty and pogroms, the Jewish community increased from 70 families in 1850 to 2,074 in 1875. Russian Jews were an estimated 39% of the city's Jewish population. Most German-speaking Jews settled in the downtown and East Side regions of Milwaukee.

Jews dominated the city's clothing and footwear manufacturing. Of the fourteen merchant tailors and clothiers in Milwaukee in 1862, five were Jewish-owned and operated. By 1895, nearly all of Milwaukee's clothing factories were Jewish-owned. Many charitable and fraternal organizations were also established during the 1800s, such as the B'nai B'rith fraternal organization, the Milwaukee Jewish Mission and the Jewish Alliance School. Multiple relief organizations were created to aid destitute veterans and their families after the American Civil War. The Settlement Cook Book was compiled by Lizzie Kander in 1901 to raise funds for "The Settlement", a community center for children and adults.

== 20th Century ==
Due to its religious tolerance, industry and German roots, Milwaukee was considered a good place for Jews. By the early 20th century, many of the community's early Jewish founders had assimilated into the city's educated German elite. In 1912, the last German-language temple in Milwaukee voted to switch to English as a reflection of the community's adoption of English as the majority language.

By 1925, the Jewish population in Milwaukee had grown to 22,000, which was eleventh largest concentration of Jews in the United States at the time. Secondary waves of Jewish immigrants came to the city in the hundreds after the rise of the Nazi party in Germany in the 1930s and the end of the Soviet Union in the late 1970s into the 1990s. These Eastern European immigrants settled on the West Side of Milwaukee in the Haymarket, Sherman Park, Upper East Side and Shorewood neighborhoods.

Milwaukee was home to multiple Jewish newspapers, including two Yiddish newspapers: the Wochenblat (1914-1932) and the Yidishe Shtimme (1930-1931). In 1921, the Wisconsin Jewish Chronicle was founded as a newspaper that was published weekly and continues into the present day to be published online.

Jews in Milwaukee became heavily involved in entrepreneurship in various industries, such as grocery stores, clothes-making, recycling, meatpacking and manufacturing. Kohl's, ManpowerGroup, Master Lock, Sigma-Aldrich and the MGIC Investment Corporation were all founded in Milwaukee during this time. The Jewish Vocational Service, the first rehabilitation agency in the United States to help veterans retrain and find jobs, opened in 1938.

By 1951, although Jews made up only 3% of Milwaukee's population, 20% of the doctors and 17% of the attorneys in the city were Jewish. The Jewish population was estimated at 23,000 in 1968.

In addition to synagogues in other parts of the city, the West Side neighborhood of Milwaukee had 5 orthodox synagogues from 1956 to 1985, each of which had its own afternoon Hebrew school until the establishment of the Hillel community day school in the 1960s. Among the Orthodox rabbis were Rabbi David Shapiro of Congregation Anshe Sfard, Rabbi Israel Feldman of Congregation Agudas Achim and Rabbi Jacob Twerski of Beth Yehuda. In the 21st century, these congregations had all closed or moved to the new northern neighborhood of Mequon, except for Congregation Beth Yehuda which remained on the West Side under the leadership of Rabbi Michel Twerski.

The Milwaukee Jewish Film Festival, held annually in October to showcase local and international Jewish films, began in 1997.

== 21st Century ==
In April 2008, the Jewish Museum Milwaukee opened to the public. It grew out of the Milwaukee Jewish Archives and features oral histories, films, and artifacts related to the Jewish community in Milwaukee.

A 2015 study by the Center for Urban Initiatives and Research at the University of Wisconsin-Milwaukee estimated that there were approximately 25,800 Jewish people living in the Greater Milwaukee area in 2011, which is 1.8% of the general population. 24% of respondents never attended synagogue, 49% attended a few times a year and 8% attended about once a month.

Hillel Milwaukee serves the community's young adult and student population. There is also a Chabad center and a Jewish Studies department at the University of Wisconsin-Milwaukee.

== Relevant buildings ==
- Congregation Beth Israel Ner Tamid: Conservative synagogue founded in 1884
- Lake Park Synagogue: Modern Orthodox synagogue
- Congregation Beth Jehudah: Orthodox synagogue
- Harry & Rose Samson Family Jewish Community Center
- Jewish Museum Milwaukee
- Milwaukee Jewish Federation
- Rabbi Ronald and Judy Shapiro Museum of Judaica
- Wisconsin Institute for Torah Study

== Notable Jews from Milwaukee ==
- Dick Chudnow, comedian and co-founder of ComedySportz
- Herb Kohl, former Wisconsin senator and founder of Kohl's
- Lizzie Black Kander, progressive activist and writer
- Golda Meir, fourth prime minister of Israel
- Newton N. Minow, attorney and former Chair of the Federal Communications Commission
- Bud Selig, baseball executive and former owner and team president of the Milwaukee Brewers
- Harry Soref, founder of the Master Lock company
- Meredith Tax, writer and activist
- Michel Twerski, Hasidic rabbi
- Elmer Winter, lawyer and co-founder of ManpowerGroup
- Zucker, Abrahams and Zucker, comedy filmmaking trio best known for Airplane!
- Gene Wilder, (né Jerome Silberman), beloved comedy actor, writer, and director during late 20th century
- Jodi Habush Sinykin, Wisconsin state senator

== See also ==
- History of Milwaukee
- Germans in Milwaukee
