= Simon Kander =

American businessman and politician

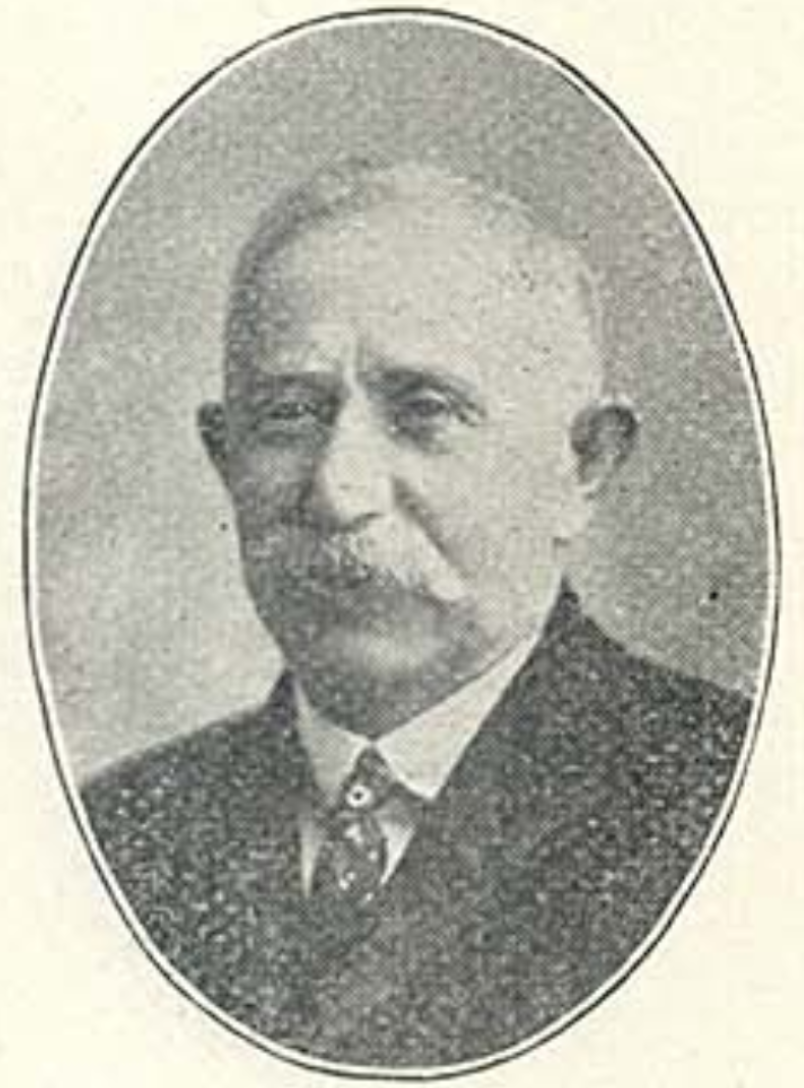

Member of the Wisconsin State Assembly from the Milwaukee 8th district
- In office January 1, 1907 – January 1, 1909
- Preceded by: Oscar F. Thieme
- Succeeded by: Fred R. Zimmerman

Personal details
- Born: Simon Kander; December 21, 1848 Baltimore, Maryland
- Died: March 13, 1931 (aged 82) Milwaukee, Wisconsin
- Resting place: Greenwood Cemetery; Milwaukee, Wisconsin
- Party: Republican
- Spouses: Elizabeth Black; (m. 1881; died 1940)
- Children: none

Simon Kander (December 21, 1848 – March 13, 1931) was an American businessman and politician. He served one term in the Wisconsin State Assembly.

== Biography ==
Born in Baltimore, Maryland, Kander went to Dickinson Seminary in Williamsport, Pennsylvania, and then moved to Titusville, Pennsylvania. In 1868, Kander moved with his parents to Milwaukee, Wisconsin. Kander was in the real estate business and was also a traveling salesman for a clothing firm. His wife was Lizzie Black Kander who was a progressive reformer. Kander served on the Milwaukee School Board. In 1907, Kander served in the Wisconsin State Assembly and was a Republican. Kander died in Milwaukee, Wisconsin, after a long illness.

He and his wife are distant relatives of former Missouri Secretary of State Jason Kander.
