= Germans in Milwaukee =

Ethnic German diaspora in the city of Milwaukee

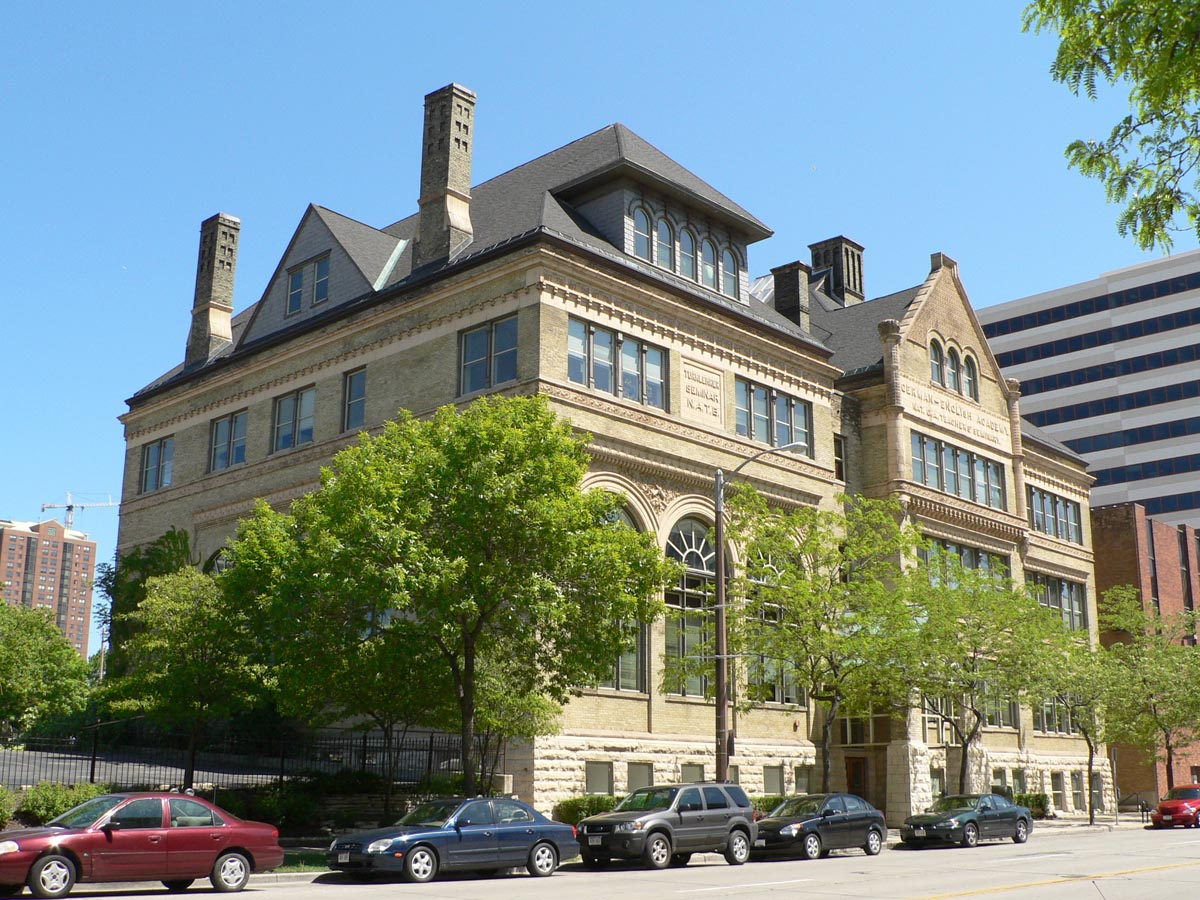
German-English Academy Building

Germans in Milwaukee are German Americans and their descendants who settled in Milwaukee, Wisconsin. German immigrants had strongly influenced Milwaukee starting in the mid-19th century, and the Milwaukee metropolitan area retains many of their institutions and celebrations.

== History ==
Most German immigrants came to Wisconsin in search of inexpensive farmland. However, immigration began to change in character and size in the late 1840s and early 1850s, due to the 1848 revolutionary movements in Europe. After 1848, hopes for a united Germany had failed, and revolutionary and radical Germans, known as the "Forty-Eighters", turned their attention to the United States.

Milwaukee began to grow as a city as high numbers of immigrants, mainly German, made their way to Wisconsin during the 1840s and 1850s. Scholars classify German immigration to the United States in three major waves, and Wisconsin received a significant number of immigrants from all three. The first wave from 1845 to 1855 consisted mainly of people from Southwestern Germany, including the multiple Hessen duchies, the Grand Duchy of Hesse chief among them; the second wave from 1865 to 1873 was mainly from Northwestern Germany; and the third wave from 1880 to 1893 came from Northeastern Germany. In the 1840s, the number of people who left German-speaking lands was 385,434; it reached 976,072 in the 1850s, and an all-time high of 1.4 million immigrated in the 1880s. In 1890, the 2.78 million first-generation German Americans represented the second-largest foreign-born group in the United States. Of all those who left the German lands between 1835 and 1910, 90 percent went to the United States, most of them traveling to the Mid-Atlantic states and the Midwest.

Many Germans chose Milwaukee due to its geographic position on Lake Michigan's west coast. It eventually became known as "the German Athens" (German: Das deutsche Athen). Radical Germans trained in politics in the old country dominated the city's Socialists political scene. Skilled workers dominated many crafts, while entrepreneurs created the brewing industry: the most famous brands included Pabst, Schlitz, Miller, and Blatz. By the late 19th century, the Germania Publishing Company was established in Milwaukee, a publisher of books, magazines, and newspapers in German. As of 1993, 52% of the Milwaukee metropolitan area's population claimed German descent, the largest European percentage in a major U.S. metropolitan area.

== Culture ==
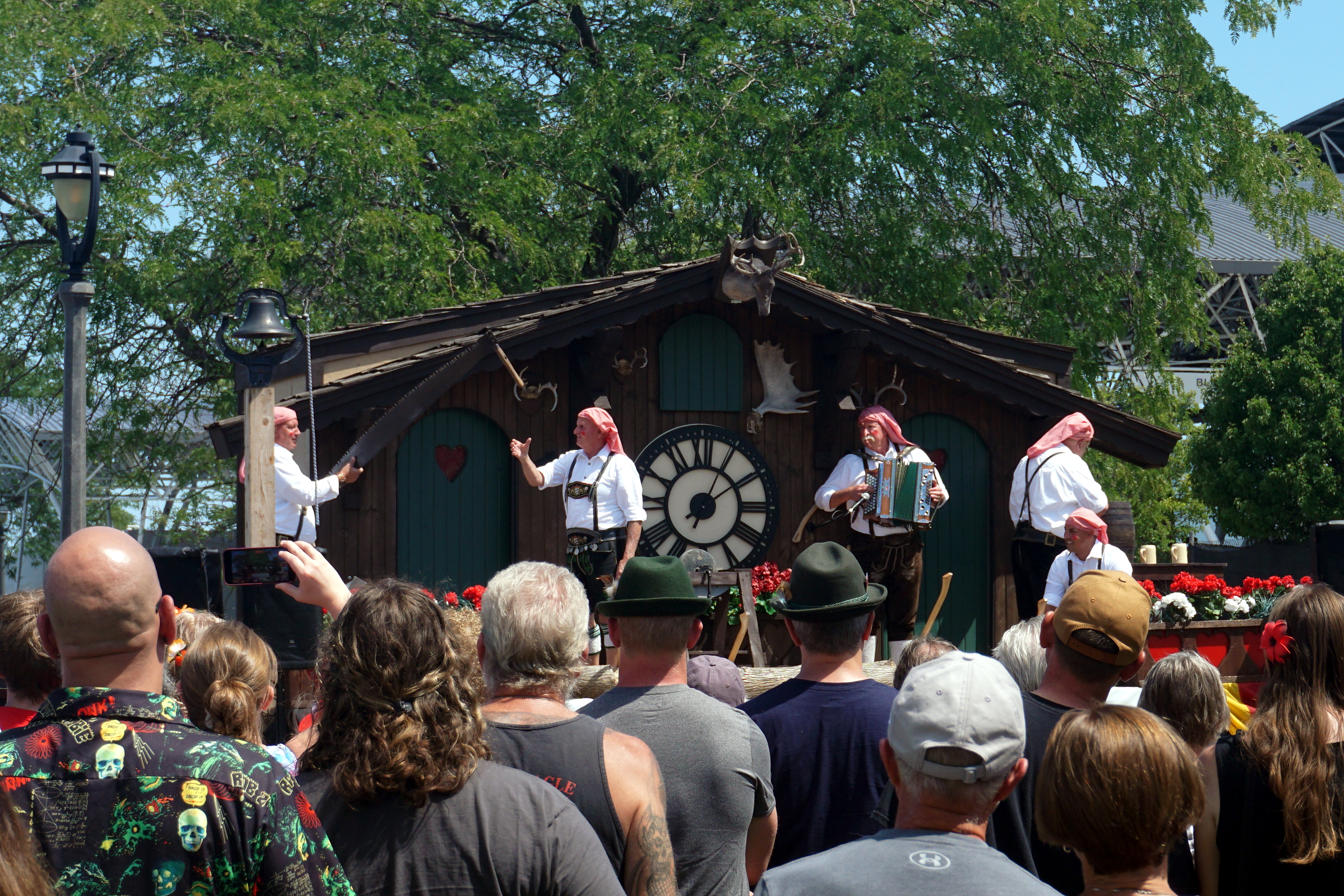
The Glockenspiel Show at German Fest 2023

Milwaukee and its suburbs have many festivals devoted to their German heritage, including Oktoberfests and German Fest. The genesis of German Fest occurred when Mayor Henry Maier challenged the local German-American community during a speech on May 20, 1980, at the 20th Anniversary of the German American National Congress (DANK) to organize a German festival.

Milwaukee retains several German restaurants, as well as a traditional German beer hall. A German language immersion school is offered for children in grades K-5.

Both MLB's Milwaukee Brewers and its minor league forerunner were inspired in large part by Milwaukee's beer brewing heritage. Former German Chancellor Helmut Kohl visited Milwaukee with U.S. President Bill Clinton in 1996 as part of a friendship tour between Germany and the U.S.

== See also ==
- History of Milwaukee
- Jews in Milwaukee
