= 2019 Kansas City mayoral election =

- June 18, 2019
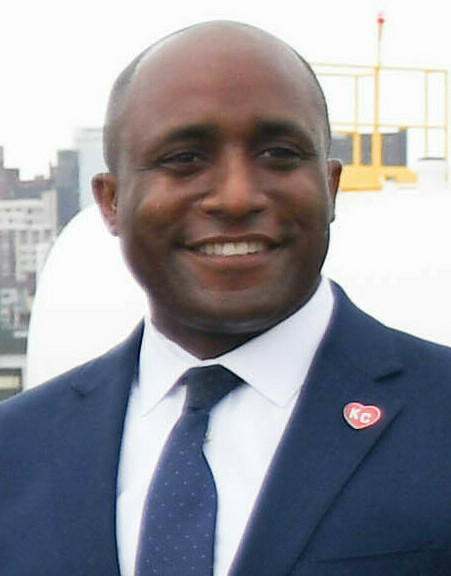

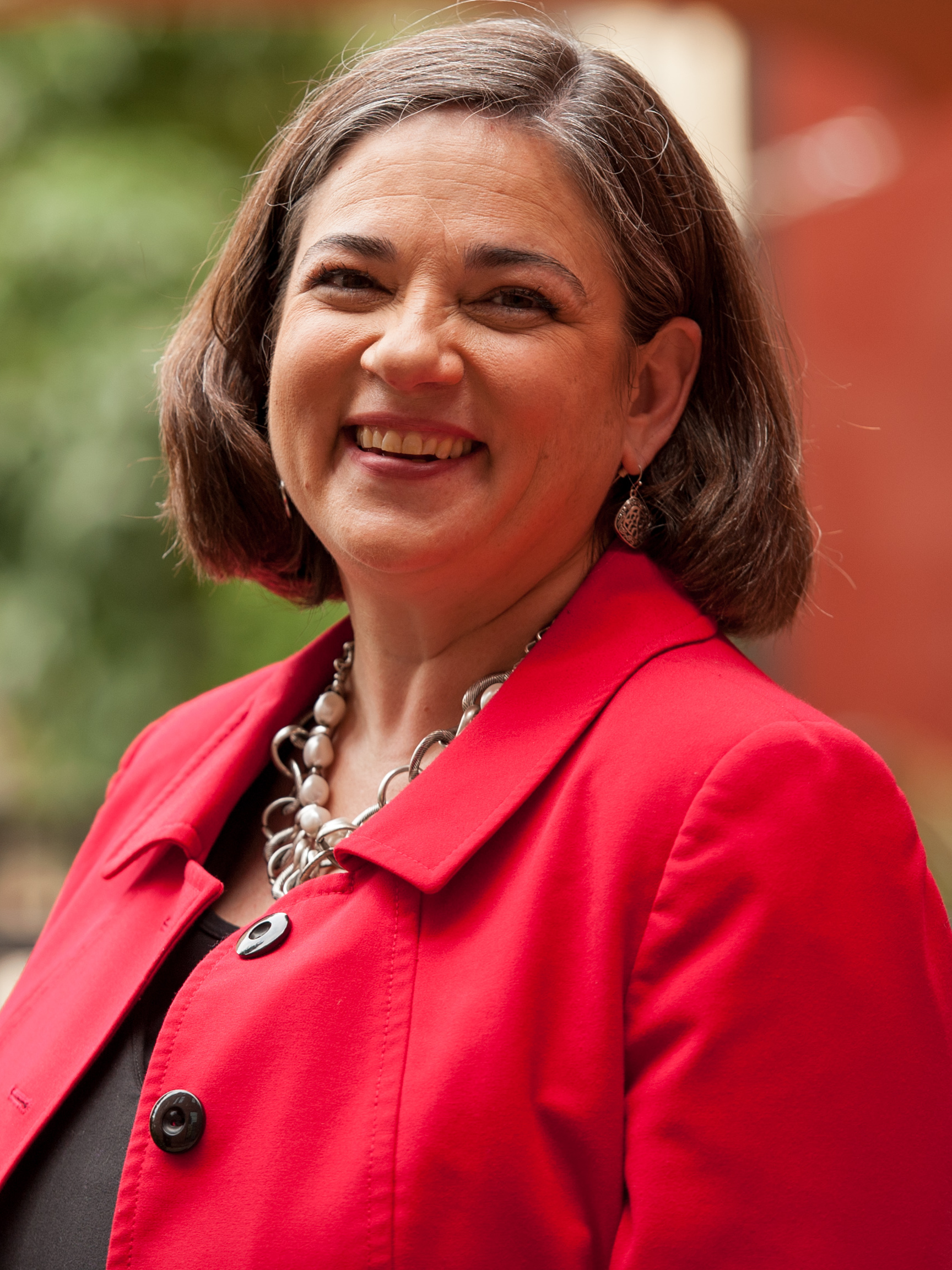
Candidate	Quinton Lucas	Jolie Justus
Popular vote	39,216	27,747
Percentage	58.56%	41.44%
Mayor before election
Sly James
Democratic
Elected mayor
Quinton Lucas
Democratic

The 2019 Kansas City mayoral election took place on June 18, 2019, to elect the next mayor of Kansas City, Missouri. The election was held concurrently with various other local elections, and was officially nonpartisan.

Incumbent mayor Sly James, in office since 2011, was term-limited and could not seek the office again.

In the nonpartisan primary held on April 2, 2019, city council members Jolie Justus and Quinton Lucas were the top-two vote winners with 23 and 18 percent of the vote, respectively. In the general election on June 18, 2019, Lucas got 59 percent vs. 41 percent for Justus.

== Candidates ==
The filing deadline was January 8.

=== Declared ===
- Alissia Canady, city councilwoman
- Clay Chastain, electrical engineer and home renovator who currently lives in Bedford, Virginia
- Phil Glynn, businessman, affiliated with the Democratic Party
- Jolie Justus, city councilwoman, former member of the Missouri Senate
- Henry Klein, charity chairman
- Vincent Lee, real estate broker
- Quinton Lucas, city councilman, affiliated with the Democratic Party
- Steve Miller, attorney, affiliated with the Democratic Party
- Jermaine Reed, city councilman
- Scott Taylor, city councilman
- Scott Wagner, city councilman, Mayor Pro Tem

=== Withdrew ===
- Rita Berry, businesswoman
- Roi Chinn
- Jason Kander, former Missouri Secretary of State (endorsed Justus)

=== Declined ===
- Austin Petersen, businessman and Libertarian candidate for presidential nomination in 2016, Republican candidate for U.S. Senate in 2018

=== Endorsements ===
==== Primary ====
Jolie Justus
- Sly James, Mayor of Kansas City
- Jason Kander, former Secretary of State of Missouri and US Senate candidate
- Kay Barnes, former Mayor of Kansas City
- Mamie Hughes, former Jackson County Legislator, Community Activist
- Gail McCann Beatty, former Missouri State House Democratic Leader
- Greg Razer, Missouri State Representative
- Scott Burnett, Jackson County Legislator
- Jeremy LaFaver, former Missouri State Representative
- CiCi Rojas, Business Leader, Former Hispanic Chamber of Commerce CEO
- Patty Garney, Northland Community Leader, Philanthropist
- Kite Singleton, Public Transportation Advocate
- LGBTQ Victory Fund
Jason Kander (withdrew)

Statewide and local politicians

- Kay Barnes, former Mayor of Kansas City
- Jon Carpenter, state representative
- Jolie Justus, City Councilwoman, and former State Senator
- Gail McCann Beatty, Minority Leader of the Missouri House of Representatives
- Kevin McManus, City Councilman, former state representative
- John Rizzo, state senator

== Primary election ==
=== Polling ===
Poll source	Date(s) administered	Sample size	Margin of error	Alissia Canady	Clay Chastain	Phil Glynn	Jolie Justus	Henry Klein	Vincent Lee	Quinton Lucas	Steve Miller	Jermaine Reed	Scott Taylor	Scott Wagner	Undecided	Other
Missouri Scout	March 27–28	497	±4.4%	14%	-	10%	18%	-	-	12%	15%	5%	6%	5%	14%	1%
SurveyUSA	February 26–March 13	610	±5.3%	8%	2%	1%	13%	1%	1%	4%	9%	7%	5%	4%	44%	-
Remington	February	485	±4%	6%	3%	-	18%	-	-	7%	15%	7%	7%	7%	29%	-
Missouri Scout	January 23–24	555	±4.2%	10%	-	5%	15%	-	-	5%	4%	8%	7%	6%	34%	7%

Hypothetical runoff polling

with Justus and Miller

Poll source	Date(s) administered	Sample size	Margin of error	Jolie Justus	Steve Miller	Undecided
Remington	February	485	±4%	33%	25%	41%

=== Results ===
Kansas City mayoral primary election, 2019
Party	Candidate	Votes	%
Nonpartisan	Jolie Justus	12,630	22.59
Nonpartisan	Quinton Lucas	10,287	18.40
Nonpartisan	Alissia Canady	7,514	13.44
Nonpartisan	Steve Miller	6,800	12.16
Nonpartisan	Scott Wagner	5,044	9.02
Nonpartisan	Scott Taylor	4,875	8.72
Nonpartisan	Phil Glynn	4,358	7.79
Nonpartisan	Jermaine Reed	3,228	5.77
Nonpartisan	Clay Chastain	514	0.92
Nonpartisan	Henry Klein	364	0.65
Nonpartisan	Vincent Lee	204	0.36
Nonpartisan	Write-in	100	0.18
Total votes		55,918	100

== General election ==
=== Polling ===
Poll source	Date(s) administered	Sample size	Margin of error	Jolie Justus	Quinton Lucas	Undecided
Remington	May 15–16	610	±3.7%	30%	38%	32%

=== Results ===
Kansas City mayoral general election, 2019
Party	Candidate	Votes	%
Nonpartisan	Quinton Lucas	39,216	58.56%
Nonpartisan	Jolie Justus	27,747	41.44%
Total votes		66,963	100%
