= Jason Kander =

American attorney and politician (born 1981)

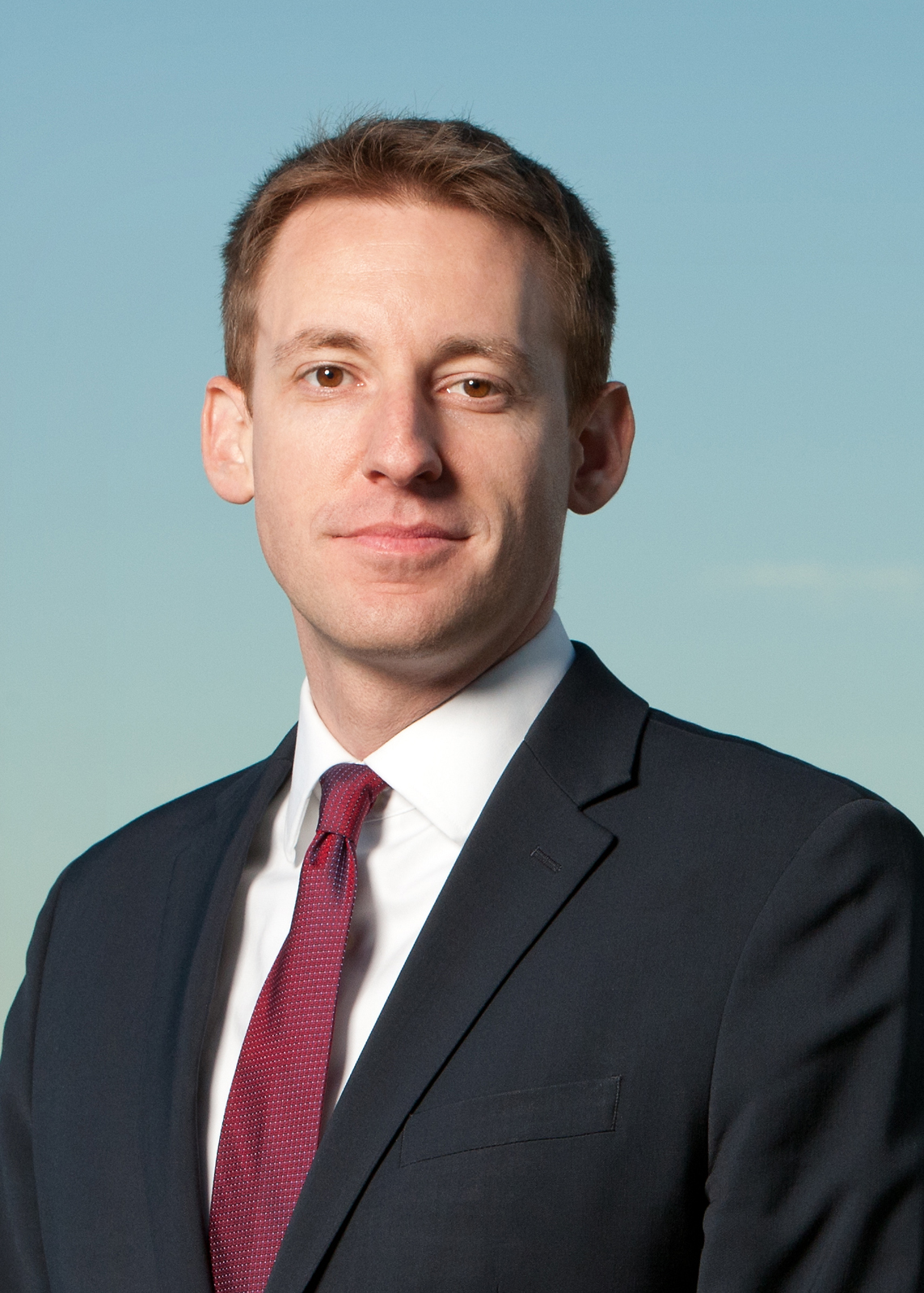
- Kander in 2012

39th Secretary of State of Missouri
- In office January 14, 2013 – January 9, 2017
- Governor: Jay Nixon
- Preceded by: Robin Carnahan
- Succeeded by: Jay Ashcroft

Member of the Missouri House of Representatives from the 44th district
- In office January 12, 2009 – January 14, 2013
- Preceded by: Jenee Lowe
- Succeeded by: Caleb Rowden

Personal details
- Born: Jason David Kander; May 4, 1981 (age 45) Overland Park, Kansas, U.S.
- Party: Democratic
- Spouse: Diana Kagan (m. 2003)
- Children: 2
- Relatives: John Kander (grand-uncle)
- Education: American University (BA); Georgetown University (JD)
- Website: Official website

Military service
- Allegiance: United States
- Branch/service: United States Army
- Years of service: 2003–2011
- Rank: Captain
- Unit: Missouri National Guard
- Battles/wars: War in Afghanistan

Jason David Kander (born May 4, 1981) is an American attorney and former politician. A Democrat, he served as the 39th secretary of state of Missouri from 2013 to 2017. He had previously served as a member of the Missouri House of Representatives from 2009 to 2013. Before entering politics, he was an intelligence officer in the Army Reserve. He served in Afghanistan and achieved the rank of captain.

He was the Democratic nominee for the United States Senate for Missouri in 2016, losing the election to Republican incumbent Roy Blunt. After the Senate election, Kander founded an organization called Let America Vote, a group focused on addressing alleged voter suppression. Though he was a rumored 2020 presidential candidate, making frequent trips to early primary states, he instead declared as a candidate in the 2019 Kansas City mayoral election before dropping out on October 2, 2018, while revealing that he suffered from PTSD and depression stemming from his service in Afghanistan.

Since 2019, Kander has served as president of national expansion at Veterans Community Project (VCP), a non-profit organization providing homeless and at-risk veterans with housing, support services, and emergency assistance.

After the U.S. military withdrew from Afghanistan, Kander led a group of U.S. military veterans in orchestrating "Operation Bella," a private rescue mission named after his then-infant daughter. Kander's initial goal was to evacuate his translator's family. He was successful in doing so. Operation Bella involved a fake wedding to fool the Taliban in the process of flying 383 Afghan allies out of the country and beyond the reach of the Taliban. Kander founded Afghan Rescue Project, a 501c3 non-profit which evacuated thousands of Afghans who assisted the United States and would have otherwise faced Taliban retribution.

== Early life and education ==
Kander was born on May 4, 1981, in Overland Park, Kansas, the son of Janet (née Secor), a juvenile probation officer, and Steve Kander, a police officer who later ran a small business. He is the nephew of composer John Kander, best known for writing the scores of Cabaret and Chicago. His father is Jewish, and Kander was brought up in a Jewish household that he describes as "Reform but not very observant." He was raised in Shawnee, Kansas, with his younger brother, Jeff, and several troubled children that his parents fostered. He graduated from Bishop Miege High School in 1999, where he played on the baseball team and was a nationally competitive debater who won two state championships.

He attended American University in Washington, D.C., where he studied political science.

== Military service ==
After the September 11 attacks, Kander enlisted in the Army National Guard. While earning his JD degree at Georgetown University Law Center in the capital, he earned his commission as a second lieutenant through the university's ROTC battalion.

He completed law school in 2005, and volunteered for a tour in Afghanistan. There he served as an intelligence officer. While serving, his main responsibilities included investigating groups and individuals suspected of corruption, espionage, drug trafficking, and facilitating Al Qaeda and the Taliban.

When he returned home, Kander took a position as an instructor at the Missouri Army National Guard's Officer Candidate School at Fort Leonard Wood. He taught 'leadership skills in combat' to hundreds of students. He also worked as an adjunct instructor in political science at the University of Missouri–Kansas City, and as an attorney at local law firms. In 2010, he was named one of ten finalists for the Army Reserve Association's Major General Strom Thurmond Outstanding Junior Officer of the Year Award. He was honorably discharged at the rank of captain in 2011.

== Political career ==
=== Heartland Democrats of America ===
Heartland Democrats of America (HDA) was a political action committee founded in 2005 in Kansas City, Missouri, by Kander and his wife, Diana. He served as the treasurer until 2007. HDA raised over one hundred thousand dollars from special interest groups and individuals in support of Democratic candidates and causes. Notable supporters included current and former state and city elected officials, along with national figures, such as Terry McAuliffe, the former Democratic National Committee (DNC) chairman and former Virginia governor; George Lakoff, an author and professor at the University of California, Berkeley; John Halpin, a senior fellow at the liberal Center for American Progress; and Mark Talisman, an author, Democratic activist, and president of the Project Judaica Foundation.

HDA's mission was to "recognize the need for Democrats to engage in, expand, and ultimately win the 'values debate.' HDA members understand that progress cannot wait for the next campaign season, because Democrats need to start changing minds now. HDA champions strong Democratic values in Missouri and throughout America's Heartland. The era of the apologetic Democrat in middle America is being laid to rest forever – replaced by a unifying values message worthy of the hard-working people of middle America." HDA was officially terminated in 2008.

=== Missouri House of Representatives ===
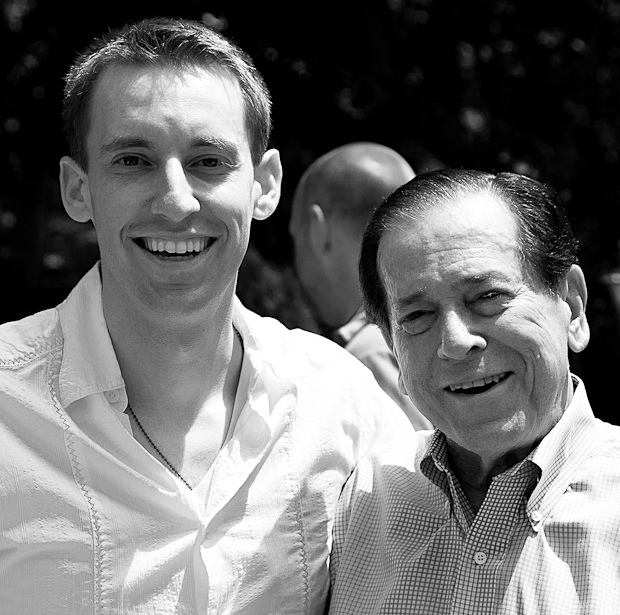
Kander with former Kansas City Mayor Richard L. Berkley in July 2011

Kander was elected to the Missouri House of Representatives in 2008, representing the 44th district. He easily defeated two other Democrats in the primary election, and was unchallenged in the general election.

Serving on the Budget Committee, Kander fought against no-bid contracts and worked to pass balanced budgets without raising taxes. He helped pass legislation strengthening Missouri's human trafficking laws, as well as a law that enabled authorities to prevent kidnappings during custody battles. In addition to his legislative duties, he was appointed in 2009 to serve on the Missouri Veterans Commission, which oversees all services for the state's veterans. In 2010, Kander worked with Republican colleague Tim Flook to pass the first major ethics reform bill in Missouri since 1991. Later that year, he ran for re-election to his seat and won 69.6% of the vote to defeat Republican Sally Miller.

During his time in the Missouri House, Kander was the chief sponsor of 28 bills, none of which became law.

=== Missouri Secretary of State ===
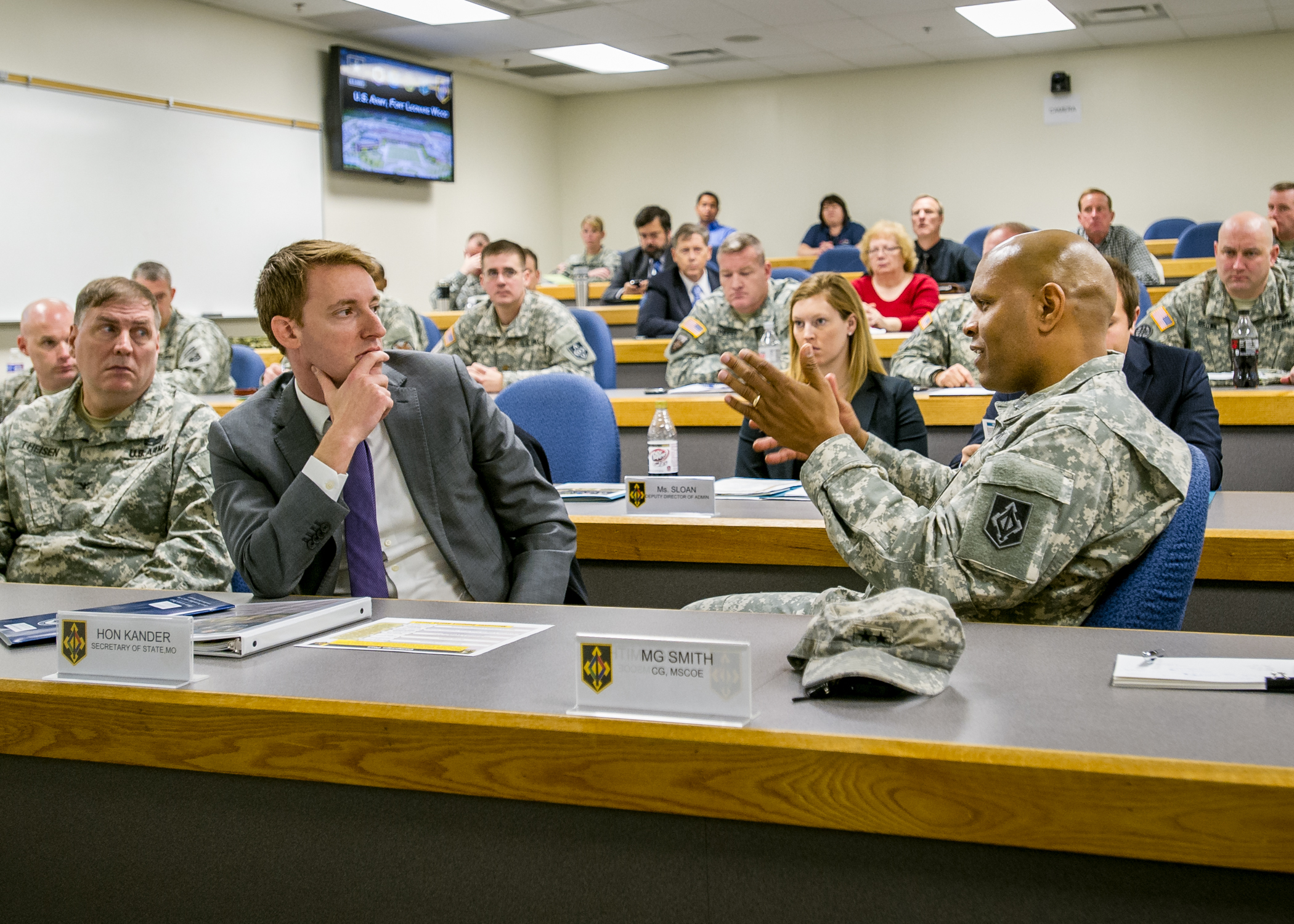
Kander visiting Fort Leonard Wood in November 2013

Kander announced his candidacy for the Missouri secretary of state after Robin Carnahan announced she would not seek reelection. He defeated MD Rabbi Alam in the primary election, winning the Democratic nomination.

In the general election, Kander faced the speaker pro tempore of the Missouri House, Shane Schoeller. Schoeller ran on a platform of implementing stricter voter identification rules. By contrast, Kander opposed harsher voter identification rules, instead focusing on reforming the state's campaign finance laws.

On November 6, 2012, Kander narrowly defeated Schoeller and was elected Missouri secretary of state. At 32 years old, he was the youngest statewide elected official in the nation at the time, as well as the first millennial.

While in office, Kander made ethics reform one of his top priorities. He admitted this could be "an uphill battle' given that Missouri has had some of the weakest ethics laws in the country and Republicans had supermajorities in both chambers of the state legislature. "I am realistic about the fact that it is not easy to get any legislative body to police itself. There is no interest group in Jefferson City called Big Ethics. I just remind legislators of both parties that this is something that the public expects of all of us," he said in 2014.

=== 2016 U.S. Senate election ===
On February 19, 2015, Kander entered the race to represent Missouri in the United States Senate against Roy Blunt, the Republican incumbent. He won the Democratic primary against three other candidates on August 2, 2016. During the campaign, he positioned himself as a Washington, D.C., outsider and touted his experience as an Army Intelligence officer. He accused Blunt of being well connected to DC lobbyists (Blunt's wife and three children are in fact lobbyists). Blunt in turn accused Kander of being too liberal.

Still from Kander's "Background Checks" ad of him assembling a rifle while blindfolded

In September, Kander's campaign received national attention when it released an advertisement explaining his support for gun control measures. Titled "Background Checks", it showed him assembling an AR-15 rifle while blindfolded and then challenging Blunt to attempt the same thing. The advertisement quickly went viral, and as of November 2016, the original YouTube video had earned more than 1.3 million views. Initially, Kander was well behind in the race, but polls started to show a tightening in the fall. In response to this, Blunt campaign began attacking Kander for being a national co-chair for presidential candidate Hillary Clinton.

During the campaign, Kander received endorsements from Americans for Responsible Solutions (later merged into Giffords Law Center to Prevent Gun Violence), Daily Kos, the League of Conservation Voters, Planned Parenthood Action Fund, and the Sierra Club.

Kander was defeated by Blunt in the general election, receiving 46.4% of the vote to Blunt's 49.2%. In spite of the loss, Kander received the most votes of any Democrat running statewide in Missouri that year, outperforming Clinton, gubernatorial candidate Chris Koster, and other Democrats.

=== 2019 mayoral election ===
Mayoral campaign logo

On June 25, 2018, Kander announced that he was running for mayor of Kansas City in 2019 to replace incumbent Sly James, who was term limited.

Prior to his announcement, Kander had been repeatedly mentioned as a possible contender for the Democratic nomination in the 2020 U.S. presidential election. Speculation about his presidential ambitions had been fueled by his frequent visits to the early primary states of Iowa and New Hampshire, and Kander had suggested he would consider exploring a bid after the 2018 midterm elections were finished. His campaign for mayor effectively put that speculation to rest. In January 2021, Kander confirmed via Twitter that he had been intending to run for president in 2020.

Kander dropped out of the mayoral race on October 2, 2018, citing the need to get treatment for symptoms of PTSD and depression. He also announced that he would be stepping away temporarily from his work with Let America Vote as he receives treatment.

=== Cabinet speculation ===
In November 2020, Kander was named as a potential candidate for Secretary of Veterans Affairs in the Biden administration. Later in December, Denis McDonough was announced as the nominee. Kander later confirmed that he had withdrawn himself from consideration for cabinet roles.

== Other work ==
In 2017, Kander became a CNN contributor. He hosts the Wonder Media Network podcast Majority 54 with Jason Kander & Ravi Gupta: he and his guests explore how Democrats can talk about divisive issues with people who voted for Donald Trump. In 2018, he published his first book, Outside the Wire: 10 Lessons I've Learned in Everyday Courage, reflecting on the period of his time in the military, to when he launched his first political campaign. He also explores how the Democratic Party should proceed following the 2016 U.S. presidential election. In 2022, he published his memoir, Invisible Storm: A Soldier's Memoir of Politics and PTSD, about his journey to post-traumatic growth. Both books were named New York Times Bestsellers.

Kander has also lent his support to other Democrats running for office, such as Jon Ossoff, Phil Murphy, Conor Lamb, Stacey Abrams, and Kyrsten Sinema.

=== Let America Vote ===
In 2017 Kander founded Let America Vote, a political action organization. Its mission is to end voter suppression and gerrymandering across the country. The group raised approximately $2.4 million in its first year. Notable members of its advisory board include human rights activist Martin Luther King III, actor Bradley Whitford, and former White House officials Josh Earnest, Jon Favreau, and Dan Pfeiffer. In his capacity as president of Let America Vote, Kander also serves as chairman of the DNC's Commission on Protecting American Democracy from the Trump administration. Congresswoman Terri Sewell serves as vice chair.

== Political positions ==
=== Campaign finance ===
He considers overturning Citizens United v. FEC a political priority. In addition to helping pass ethics reform while a state representative, while serving as secretary of state, he forbade his office employees from taking any gifts from lobbyists.

=== Education ===
Kander supported the Every Student Succeeds Act of 2015, which replaced the No Child Left Behind Act of 2001.

For higher education, he supports capping interest rates on federal student loans and expanding Pell Grants to provide more aid to low-income students. He believes students who have graduated need should be able to refinance their loans at lower rates.

=== Fiscal policy ===
Kander supports tax breaks for the middle class and closing tax loopholes for corporations. He is in favor of increasing the federal minimum wage, and for ensuring equal pay for equal work. He is supportive of adding a balanced budget amendment to the United States Constitution.

Ahead of the August 7, 2018, referendum on Proposition A to adopt right-to-work laws in Missouri, Kander made social media posts in opposition to the proposition.

=== Foreign relations ===
Kander is skeptical of the Iran nuclear deal. He is pro-Israel and has called on Congress to stop the Boycott, Divestment and Sanctions movement.

=== Gun control ===
In 2009, Kander voted against a bill that would have extended to renters the Castle Doctrine (a doctrine that allows a homeowner to use deadly force against a perceived intruder). The bill would have also lowered the age requirement for a concealed carry permit and would have removed a ban on carrying a gun on a college campus. The NRA Political Victory Fund gave Kander an "F" rating and spent nearly $1 million against him in 2016 (the most money against any candidate that year outside of Ohio).

=== Healthcare ===
Kander supports improving the Patient Protection and Affordable Care Act. He has proposed changing the 30-hour workweek used to define full-time employees, allowing cheaper plans for people who do not require medical care, and repealing the long-delayed Cadillac tax. He is in favor of a public health insurance option, but also supports single-payer healthcare. He believes states should take advantage of the Medicaid expansion the law provided.

Kander is pro-choice but is in favor of retaining the Hyde Amendment.

=== Judiciary ===
Kander was critical of Republican senators who refused to meet with Supreme Court nominee Merrick Garland, citing it as an example of Washington dysfunction. He believes senators should meet with all Supreme Court nominees.

=== LGBT rights ===
Kander supports the 2015 United States Supreme Court ruling in Obergefell v. Hodges that deemed the Defense of Marriage Act unconstitutional. While a state legislator, he co-sponsored the Missouri Non-discrimination Act (MONA); the bill never became law. As secretary of state, he implemented a non-discrimination policy for the office's hiring practices that would have conformed to MONA had it become law. He supports passing the federal Equality Act into law.

=== National security ===
On immigration policy, Kander was supportive of the bipartisan immigration bill of 2013 that passed the Senate but was never considered by the House. He was opposed to closing the detention camp at Guantanamo Bay but also voted against a measure to prevent Missouri from housing, transporting, or providing medical care to any prisoners suspected of terrorism.

=== Trade ===
Kander opposes the Trans-Pacific Partnership, believing it hurts working-class families and encourages sending jobs overseas. He is, however, in favor of modernizing the Cuban embargo to allow American farmers and ranchers to sell their goods into Cuba.

=== Welfare ===
Kander is against privatizing Social Security. On Medicare, he believes the government should be using its marketplace clout to negotiate lower prescription drug prices. He also believes both programs can be strengthened by eliminating wasteful government spending in other sectors.

== Awards ==
On April 19, 2018, Kander was honored for his commitment to integrity in government with the James C. Kirkpatrick Excellence in Governance Award by the student government association at the University of Central Missouri. At the ceremony, he encouraged the audience to remain confident in the promise of America and to serve wherever they find the opportunity.

On May 8, 2023, Kander received the Truman Foundation's Good Neighbor Award. Previous honorees include Supreme Court justices, top journalists, humanitarians, and even U.S. presidents.

On May 19, 2023, Georgetown University bestowed upon Kander an honorary doctorate in humane letters in conjunction with his delivery of that year's commencement address.

== Personal life and family ==
Kander married his high school sweetheart, entrepreneur and author Diana Kander (née Kagan) in 2003. Diana and her family emigrated from Odesa in the Soviet Union in 1989. The couple has one son, who was born in September 2013, and one daughter, who was born in September 2020.

Kander is the grand-nephew of musical composer John Kander, whose best-known works include Cabaret and Chicago. He is a distant relative of Lizzie Black Kander, author of The Settlement Cook Book. He is an avid fan of the Kansas City Royals.

Kander also plays centerfield for the Kansas City Hustlers of the National Men's Adult Baseball League.

== Bibliography ==
- Kander, Jason (2018). Outside the Wire: 10 Lessons I've Learned in Everyday Courage. Twelve Books. ISBN 978-1538747599.
- Kander, Jason (2022). Invisible Storm: A Soldier's Memoir of Politics and PTSD. Mariner Books. ISBN 978-0358658962.

Party political offices
Preceded by Robin Carnahan	Democratic nominee for Secretary of State of Missouri; 2012	Succeeded by Robin Smith
Preceded by Robin Carnahan	Democratic nominee for U.S. Senator from Missouri (Class 3); 2016	Succeeded by Trudy Busch Valentine
Political offices
Preceded by Robin Carnahan	Secretary of State of Missouri; 2013–2017	Succeeded by Jay Ashcroft
