= Jewish Museum Milwaukee =

Museum in Milwaukee, Wisconsin, USA

- Established: 2008
- Location: Milwaukee, Wisconsin, United States
- Coordinates: 43.0479°N 87.8947°W
- Public transit access: MCTS; The Hop
- Website: www.jewishmuseummilwaukee.org

Jewish Museum Milwaukee is located in Milwaukee, Wisconsin, USA. The Jewish Museum Milwaukee's mission is to preserve and present the Jewish experience through the lens of Greater Milwaukee, and to celebrate the continuum of Jewish heritage and culture. The archives, exhibitions, programs and publications inspire public appreciation for the diversity of Jewish life in a local and global historic context.

== Description ==
Jewish Museum Milwaukee, a program of the Milwaukee Jewish Federation, was founded in 2008. This milestone marked over twenty years of collecting, archiving, and exhibiting. The Museum's archives was established by the Milwaukee Jewish Federation Women's Division's Archives/Roots Committee in the 1980s, which drove the establishment of the Milwaukee Jewish Historical Society in 1997.

Jewish Museum Milwaukee's core exhibit explores the history of the Jewish experiences from both a local and global perspective. Each year the museum curates up to three special exhibits based on cultural, historic or artistic significance. The Museum's tag line is "Where Conversations Happen". The Museum builds bridges to and with diverse groups based on shared historical experiences and explores contemporary issues through the lens of history, art and culture. Based on the Jewish tenet of Tikkun Olam (repair the world) the museum focuses on social justice issues through its exhibits and programs.

Jewish Museum Milwaukee's archives house a significant collection of photographs, manuscripts, oral histories and newspaper clippings that record the organizational, educational, cultural, social, philanthropic and business activities of the Jewish community in Milwaukee. Primarily donated by local residents, these materials tell the story of the Jewish immigrant experience, from the first arrival of German and Eastern European Jews in the 1800s to those who left the former Soviet Union and settled in Milwaukee in the 1970s.

Jewish Museum Milwaukee is located in the Milwaukee Jewish Federation's Helfaer Community Service Building designed by Edward Durell Stone, architect of the John F. Kennedy Center for the Performing Arts in Washington D.C.

Jewish Museum Milwaukee is closed on Saturdays and for Jewish festivals and holy days: Rosh Hashana, Yom Kippur, Sukkot, Shemini Atzeret, Simchat Torah, first two and last two days of Passover, and Shavuot.

== Location ==
Jewish Museum of Milwaukee is located at 1360 N Prospect Avenue in Milwaukee. The Museum and Archives are situated within Milwaukee's museum district north of the downtown area, and a ten-minute walk from the Milwaukee Art Museum, the Charles Allis Art Museum, Discovery World, and the Betty Brinn Children's Museum.

== Exhibits ==
=== Stitching Histories from the Holocaust ===
This exhibit tells the story of Hedwig Strnad and her husband Paul through letters sent to a cousin in Milwaukee from Nazi-occupied Prague. Strnad created and included dress designs in the letters in the hope of obtaining visas. Both Strands were murdered in the Holocaust, but Hedwig's dress designs survived and have been created by the Milwaukee Repertory Theater's costume shop and are included in the exhibit.

=== Sara Spira postcards ===
Presented with Stitching Histories from the Holocaust is a series of postal cards written by Sara Spira, a Polish-German Jewish woman who perished in the Holocaust. Spira lived in Leipzig, Germany for some time in the early interwar period. She lived in Leipzig with her husband Max until his death in 1920. While living in Leipzig, the couple's only child, a daughter named Mary, was born in 1918. After her husband's death, Spira made a living operating a dry goods store.

Spira left Leipzig for Gorlice, Poland sometime before the outbreak of World War II, in the mid to late 1930s. Spira was deported from Germany to the Gorlice Ghetto in Poland from where she continued to write a series of postcards to her daughter who had emigrated to Wisconsin in 1938, until Spira perished in the holocaust.

The postcards written by Spira have also been used as examples of the experience of a specific individual experiencing the Holocaust in a course taught at the University of Wisconsin.

=== Degenerate! Hitler's War on Modern Art ===
Running from February 24 to June 4 2023, this exhibit talks about the war on degenerate art by Adolf Hitler and the Nazi Party, featuring many pieces of art that were confiscated and condemned under Nazi Germany and the campaign to discredit modernist art through an exhibition.
