= Oscar F. Thieme =

American politician (1869–1926)

Member of the Wisconsin State Assembly from the Milwaukee 8th district
- In office January 1, 1905 – January 1, 1907
- Preceded by: Reinhold Thiessenhusen
- Succeeded by: Simon Kander

Personal details
- Born: May 28, 1869 Milwaukee, Wisconsin
- Died: 1926 (aged 56–57)
- Resting place: Forest Home Cemetery; Milwaukee, Wisconsin
- Party: Republican
- Spouses: Mary H. Thieme; (died 1944)
- Children: none

Oscar F. Thieme (May 28, 1869 – 1926) was an American businessman and politician from Milwaukee, Wisconsin. He served one term as a member of the Wisconsin State Assembly.

== Biography ==
Oscar Thieme was born in Milwaukee, Wisconsin. He was educated and lived most of his life there. He worked in real estate and insurance, and, for a time, was employed as a clerk for Milwaukee County judges Emil Wallber, James M. Pereles, and John E. Mann. He was elected to the Assembly as a Republican, representing Milwaukee County's 8th district (the 9th ward of the city of Milwaukee) in a three-way race, defeating Democrat David Geraghty and Social Democrat William Baumann.

He died in 1926 and was buried at Milwaukee's Forest Home Cemetery.
