= Seal of Milwaukee =

Munincipal seal of Milwaukee, Wisconsin

Seal of the City of Milwaukee
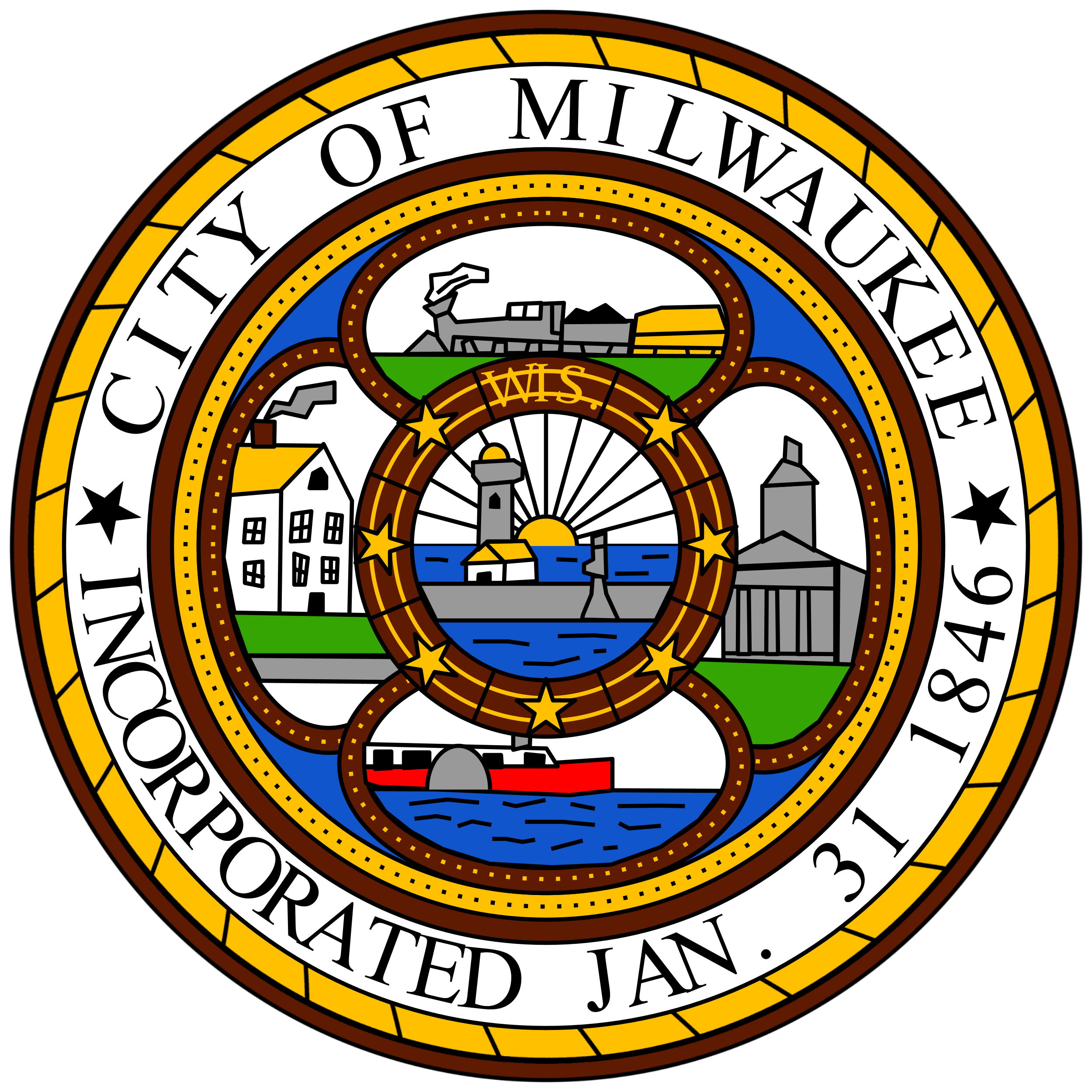
- Armiger: Cavalier Johnson, Mayor of Milwaukee
- Adopted: 1846
- Supporter: None
- Use: Official correspondence, insignia of city agencies and institutions

The Seal of the City of Milwaukee is a civic seal that displays various symbols of the city of Milwaukee, Wisconsin.

The first version of Milwaukee's seal was developed around the time of the city's incorporation in 1846 and was used on land deeds. The original seal, depicting the city's first lighthouse, appears on at least one deed that predates the city's actual incorporation. The original now resides in the collection of the Milwaukee County Historical Society, having been donated by the "Old Settlers’ Club", a group formed in 1869 consisting of people who lived in Milwaukee prior to January 1839 and who were devoted to preserving the city's early history.

The seal was later revised to include other elements. At the center of the current version is a lighthouse scene showing a sunrise over Lake Michigan. This image is surrounded by seven stars and an abbreviation for Wisconsin, WIS. Other images on the seal are a railroad train, the original city hall, a steamboat, and a house. The words CITY OF MILWAUKEE appear at the top of the outer circle, and INCORPORATED JAN. 31 1846 appears at the bottom.

In 1939 a stained glass version of the seal was created by Conrad Schmitt Studios as part of the Works Progress Administration, and in 1978 this piece of public art was restored and placed inside the Common Council chamber.

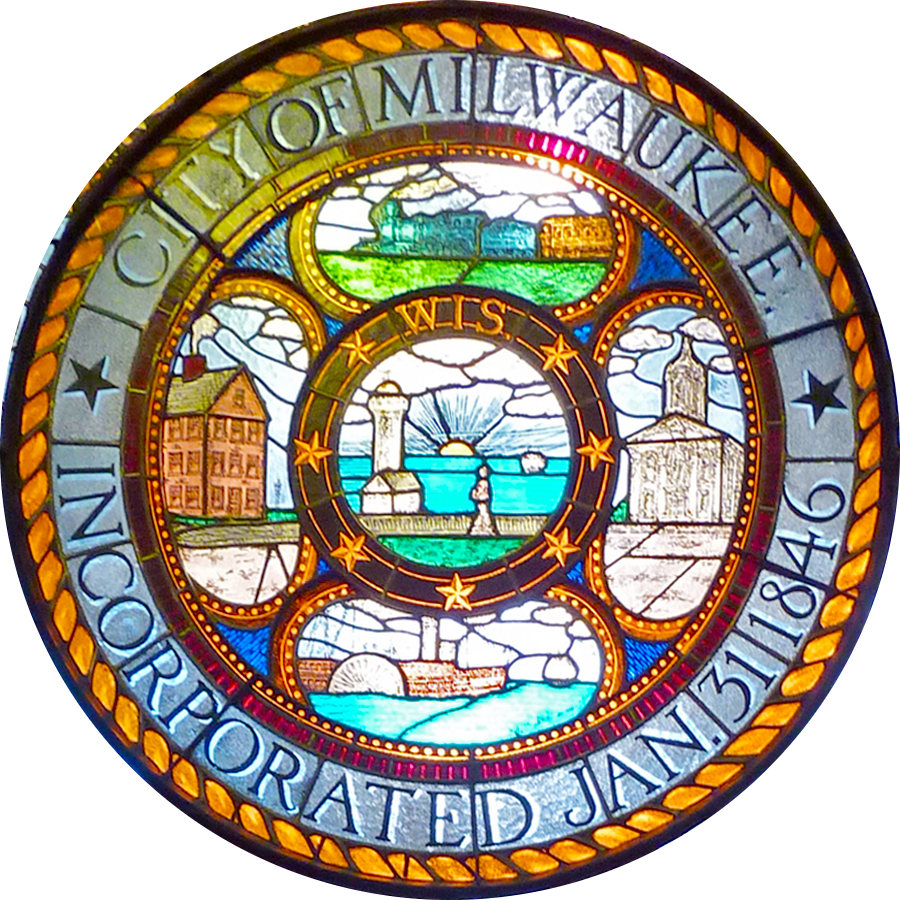
1939 stained glass seal

In 1944, Milwaukee's entry in the All-American Girls Professional Baseball League wore a uniform patch based on the city seal.

== See also ==
- History of Milwaukee
