= Jermaine Reed =

American public official from Kansas City, Missouri

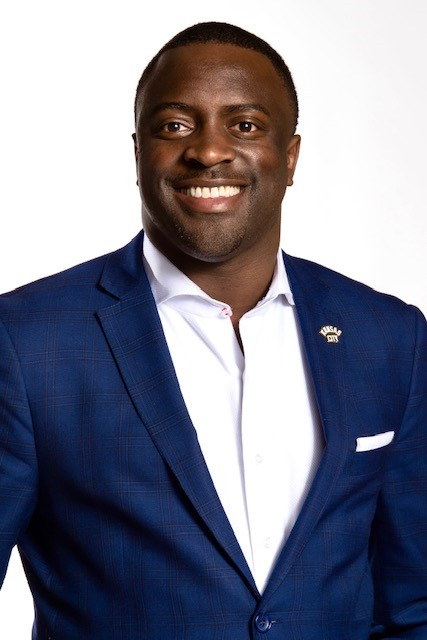

Member of the Kansas City, Missouri City Council
- In office 2011–2019
- Constituency: 3rd District

Member of the Metropolitan Community College Board of Trustees
- Incumbent
- Assumed office June 12, 2020
- Constituency: Subdistrict 2

Personal details
- Education: University of Missouri (B.A., Political Science); University of Missouri–Kansas City (Executive M.P.A.)
- Occupation: Public official

Jermaine Reed is an American public official who served on the Kansas City, Missouri City Council, where he represented the city's 3rd District from 2011 to 2019. Reed unsuccessfully ran for Mayor of Kansas City in 2019.

== Early life and education ==
Reed grew up in Kansas City, Missouri. Reed experienced homelessness as a teenager, later becoming involved in civic groups and student media. Reed earned a bachelor's degree in political science from the University of Missouri.

== Career ==
=== Kansas City Council (2011–2019) ===
In 2011, Reed was elected to represent the 3rd District on the Kansas City Council at age 25 and was described by KCUR as the youngest councilman to serve in elected office. He was re-elected in 2015.

Reed supported development initiatives. After his election, Reed worked to attract full-service grocery stores to "food desert" neighborhoods. In 2014, an Aldi Süd grocery store was opened at 39th Street and Prospect Avenue, with Reed voicing approval. Later, a Sun Fresh grocery opened at the Linwood Shopping Center.

In 2017, Reed announced his candidacy for mayor of Kansas City in the 2019 election to succeed Mayor Sly James.

Reed participated in the selection and approval process for the new Kansas City International Airport terminal as a member of the selection committee and later voted with the City Council to approve Edgemoor for the project.

== Metropolitan Community College Board of Trustees ==
Since 2020, Reed has served on the Metropolitan Community College Board of Trustees (Subdistrict 2).

Reed was reelected to the Metropolitan Community College Board of Trustees for Subdistrict 2 in April 2026.

== Election results ==
=== 2011 City Council election ===
==== General ====
2011 Kansas City Council General – 3rd District
Candidate	Party	Vote %	Votes
Jermaine Reed	Nonpartisan	64.98%	5,156
Sharon Brooks	Nonpartisan	35.02%	2,779
Total votes		100.00%	7,935

Source: Kansas City Board of Election Commissioners, Municipal General Election Official Results, March 22, 2011.

=== 2015 City Council election ===
==== Primary ====
2015 Kansas City Council Primary – 3rd District
Candidate	Party	Vote %	Votes
Jermaine Reed (incumbent)	Nonpartisan	57.04%	2,752
Jamekia Kendrix	Nonpartisan	17.45%	842
Rachel Riley	Nonpartisan	11.09%	535
Bryan Dial	Nonpartisan	7.52%	363
Shaheer Akhtab	Nonpartisan	6.61%	319
Write-ins	—	0.29%	14
Total votes		100.00%	4,825

Source: Kansas City Board of Election Commissioners, Past Election Results (see "April 7, 2015 — Municipal Primary & School Board Election").

==== General ====
2015 Kansas City Council General – 3rd District
Candidate	Party	Vote %	Votes
Jermaine Reed (incumbent)	Nonpartisan	72.05%	3,701
Jamekia Kendrix	Nonpartisan	27.95%	1,436
Total votes		100.00%	5,137

Source: Kansas City Board of Election Commissioners, Past Election Results (see "June 23, 2015 — Municipal General Election").

== Education ==
Reed holds a degree in political science from the University of Missouri and an Executive Master of Public Administration from the University of Missouri–Kansas City.

== Awards ==
- 2025 Alvin Brooks Award from the Kansas City Metropolitan Crime Commission at its 76th Annual Law Enforcement Appreciation Luncheon
