= Milwaukee Jewish Film Festival =

The Milwaukee Jewish Film Festival is an annual, publicly-attended film festival hosted by the Harry & Rose Samson Family Jewish Community Center and held in Milwaukee, Wisconsin. The multi-day festival celebrates local, national and international Jewish films and filmmaking. Established in 1997, the film festival is held in a hybrid format, streaming online and offering in-person screenings.
