= Jenee Lowe =

American politician

Jenee Lowe (born September 5, 1955) is a former American Democrat politician from Kansas City, Missouri, who served in the Missouri House of Representatives.

Born in Kansas City, Missouri, she attended Ruskin High School, Avila College, and Longview Community College.
