= Lizzie Black Kander =

American writer, reformer and philanthropist

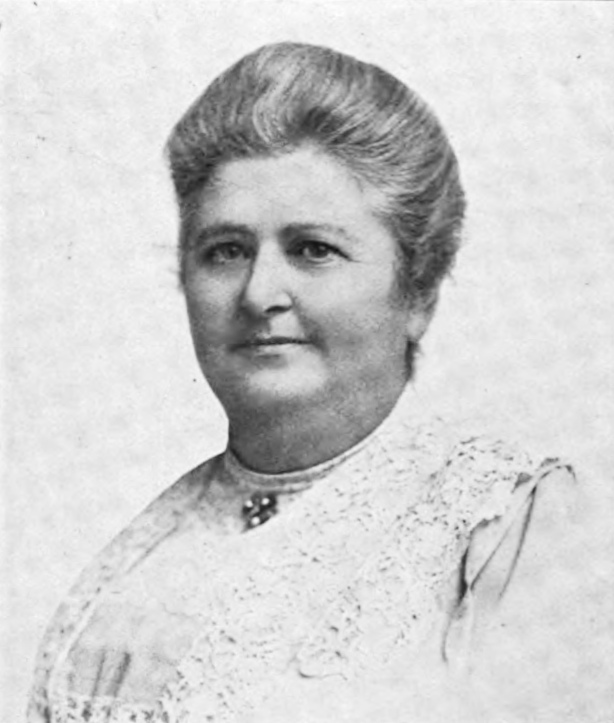
Lizzie Black Kander

Elizabeth Black Kander (1858–1940) was an American progressive reformer, philanthropist and author, founder of a settlement house in Milwaukee, where she originated her best-known work, The Settlement Cookbook.

== Early life ==
Elizabeth Black was born on May 28, 1858, to John and Mary (Perles) Black, who were from Jewish families from England and Bavaria. The Black family had previously lived in Green Bay, Wisconsin before their 1844 move to the South Side of Milwaukee. John Black opened a dry goods store to support the family. At this time, the Blacks were one of over two hundred German Jewish families who lived as merchants in the Milwaukee area. Kander's parents were founding members of the Reform temple Temple Emanu-El and believed in reconciling religion with the progressive ideas of the age. At a young age, Kander was taught from her mother that "home reigned supreme." This concept would carry throughout all of her progressive work.

She attended and graduated valedictorian from Milwaukee East High School. In her valedictorian speech, she “spoke of the need to restore economic individualism and political democracy to American cities”. She believed that “social decay could not be entirely blamed on the effects of rapid industrialization, urbanization, or capitalism, but from the general wiliness of women to escape personal responsibility”. Although Kander had progressive ideas, she did not agree with the women's suffrage movement. It had become an unproductive distraction. Like other female reformers of her time, Kander believed in “municipal housekeeping”. Women could use their natural housekeeping ability to manage the larger home of the city. An increasing belief was that the center of home life was responsible for the moral tone of the community.

Soon after her graduation, she joined the Ladies Relief Sewing Society. This became the foundation of her future reform work. She met Simon Kander, a native of Baltimore who had moved to Milwaukee in 1868, through their mutual interest in public school reform. Black and Kander were married on May 17, 1881; the couple never had children.

== Progressive work ==
From 1890 to 1893, Kander worked as truancy officer to view the home conditions of Milwaukee's Russian immigrant families. The conditions were ““a deplorable situation, threatening the moral and physical health of the people”. Kander reported her finding to her women club members and challenged them to get involved in reforming the area. She developed a program to have volunteers visit homes and assess the extent of need for each immigrant family. This was done to help “Americanize hard to reach immigrant mothers isolated in their home as well as channel immigrant mother[s] to other Jewish charitable services”.

Because Kander refused to accept social reform as essentially Christian, she joined the Milwaukee Chapter of the National Council of Jewish Women (NCJW) which was established to provide sewing, cooking and English classes to Russian immigrants. Kander believed Jewish women had an obligation to have a role in “advancing the history and customs of their forefathers.” Settlement achieved the greatest amount of success with Jewish communities because they oriented towards achieving middle class status through education; and settlement houses could help them “achieve this goal.” Settlement house was “their celebration of immigrant culture was meant to be a temporary way station along the road to eventual Americanization.” Kander was able to target this amongst the Jewish community in Milwaukee. In 1895 she founded the Keep Clean Mission at B'ne Jeshurun Temple in Milwaukee. Kander founded it with $75 of her own money. The Mission served one hundred children from ages five to ten years old. They were given a short sermon on cleanliness in all aspects of their life.

== Settlement house and cookbook ==
The Ladies Relief Sewing Society's mission was to “alleviate the suffering of the poor and needy by furnishing them with clothing.” The women would collect clothing and repair them from needy families. She was elected President of the Society in 1894.

The particular poor in mind were the increasing number of Jews from the increased immigration from Eastern Europe particularly. The women soon realized providing clothing was not enough. They set to “improve sanitary conditions, maintain school attendance among immigrant children, and help speed acculturation through recreation and skills class in sewing, darning, mending, crocheting, embroidery, painting, and drawing.” This was later renamed Milwaukee Jewish Mission at Emanu-El Guild Hall.

On March 27, 1900, Kander's Milwaukee Jewish Mission was combined with the Sisterhood of Personal Service to establish a settlement house on North 5th Street. The Settlement was financially supported by Milwaukee's business elite. Her husband, Simon, with his real estate business and short tenure as a Republican State Representative, had many connections which gave her the opportunity to solicit contributions for her settlement work.

Kander was elected president; in addition to her administrative duties, she taught cooking classes. These cooking classes were used to help Americanize the family and educate immigrants on nutrition. The immigrant girls would bring “American practices and values back from the settlement house into their homes.” These cooking classes helped break poor cultural diets through nutritional education of the young women.

To keep the Settlement House in operation longer, it had to find a more stable source of funding. Kander suggested creating a cookbook with her cooking class’ recipes supplemented with recipes by her fellow club-women. However the Settlement's Board of Directors refused to provide the $18 needed to publish the book. Kander approached Metron Yewdlale, a Milwaukee printer, to help publish the cookbook, and he agreed to undertake the work, which was supported by selling advertisements. Although the complete title of the book was The Way to A Man's Heart ... The Settlement Cook Book, it is generally known as The Settlement Cook Book. She compiled a 174-page collection of recipes, household hints, and advice on housekeeping. The book also served as a tool for its audience to better assimilate into the American way of life.

The Settlement was funded by the cookbook for nine years. At this point, the Settlement had outgrown its original location. The proceeds of the book funded the building of the Abraham Lincoln House in 1911 which became the new location of the Settlement House. It later help provide the funds to expand the Jewish Community Center through the purchase of the Milwaukee University High School building.

None of the women were paid until 1917 when Settlement House had sufficient funds to begin hiring a staff. Only in 1921 did Kander agree to accept a royalty of 20 cents per book. At this point when demand for The Settlement Cook Book outgrew supply, Kander and her committee formed the Settlement Cook Book Company, a philanthropic company which guided the book to forty editions.

The first Settlement Cook Book was published in 1901 and its 1,000 copies sold out within one year. The book proved so popular that 34 subsequent editions—totaling 2 million copies—followed the original edition.

== Other work ==
In April 1907, Kander was one of the first women to win election to the Milwaukee School Board (Wisconsin's Women).

During World War I, Kander led Milwaukee's Food Conservation Council, and established a food exchange to provide meals to folks at minimal cost - among the first in the country.

She was able to translate her settlement house programs into the public schools by leading an investigation of Milwaukee's first public program of industrial education for girls. At Kander's influence, the Milwaukee Public School Board passed her resolution and established a Girls’ Trade School. This allowed “American” housekeeping to be taught through extension courses in the public school and could reach a wider audience of Milwaukee's working-class women.

She joined with other women to form a pro-social center alliance to improve conditions for the whole community.

== Later life and legacy ==
Lizzie Black Kander died on July 24, 1940, of a stroke.

From 1914 to her death in 1940, Kander would edit and revise each new edition of the cookbook. In 1939, Kander was “honored at the New York World’s fair with a special invitation to attend as one of the state’s outstanding women.”

In 1995, the Settlement Foundation turned the book and its assets over to the Greater Milwaukee Foundation, which continues to make donations to women's and children's groups in Milwaukee.

She and her husband are distant relatives of former Missouri Secretary of State Jason Kander.

In 2023, with an endowment of from anonymous donor, the Harry & Rose Samson Family Jewish Community Center created the Lizzie Kander Heart of Community Scholarship, an annual award for a graduating high school senior impacted by a JCC program, honoring Kander’s legacy of community leadership and service.
