= German Fest =

- Interactive map of German Fest
- Location: Henry Maier Festival Park, Milwaukee, Wisconsin, USA
- Coordinates: 43.032°N 87.899°W
- Opened: July 24, 1981
- General manager: Eric Radue
- Theme: German Ethnic festival
- Slogan: A Milwaukee Tradition
- Website: www.germanfest.com

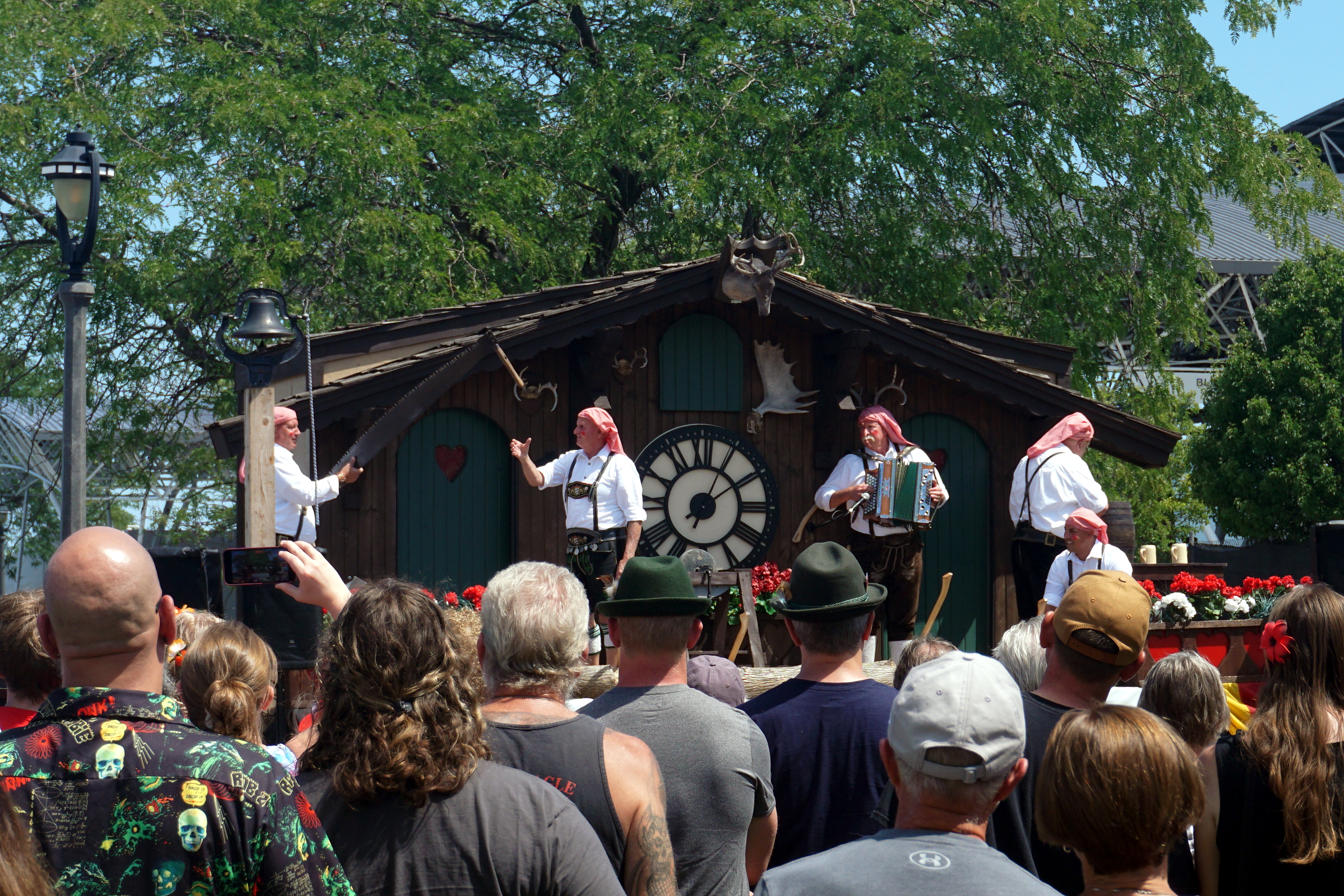
The Glockenspiel Show at German Fest 2023

German Fest is an ethnic festival in Milwaukee, Wisconsin, US at the Henry Maier Festival Park, on the Lake Michigan lakefront. The genesis of German Fest occurred when Mayor Henry Maier challenged the local German-American community during a speech on May 20, 1980, at the 20th anniversary of the German American National Congress (DANK) to organize a German festival. Shortly thereafter, Walter Geissler, then President of D.A.N.K., chaired a committee of five members that laid the foundation for the Fest. The charter of German Fest was subsequently written in January 1981. The first German Fest was held in August 1981. It is billed as the "Largest German celebration in North America" and "A Milwaukee Tradition". It currently occurs during the last full weekend in July. As of 1993, 52% of Milwaukee's population claimed German descent, which is the largest European percentage in a major U.S. metropolitan area.

German Fest celebrates the culture, food, travel and history of Germany, as well as Switzerland, Austria, Liechtenstein, South Tyrol, and German-speaking communities around the world.

One attraction is the cultural tent, where one can see the various groups, including both former and current provinces that proudly call themselves "German." They range from Bavarians (Bayern), and Hessians (Hessen), to other German speaking nations such as the Austrians (Österreich), and groups displaced by World War II whose homelands are now located in Poland (Polen), Hungary (Ungarn), and the former Czechoslovakia and Yugoslavia (Tschechoslowakei & Jugoslawien).

In the center area of the grounds a parade periodically passes by, showcasing 38 German-American heritage organizations, local German immersion schools, and others celebrating their German heritage.

German cuisine is also featured at German Fest. German restaurants and food services in the area are present at the fest, including Mader's, and the Schwabenhof, as well as the biggest sausage maker in Milwaukee, Usinger's. Usinger's celebrated its 125th anniversary in 2005, in a joint anniversary of German Fest's 25th anniversary.
