= The Settlement Cook Book =

1901 cookbook

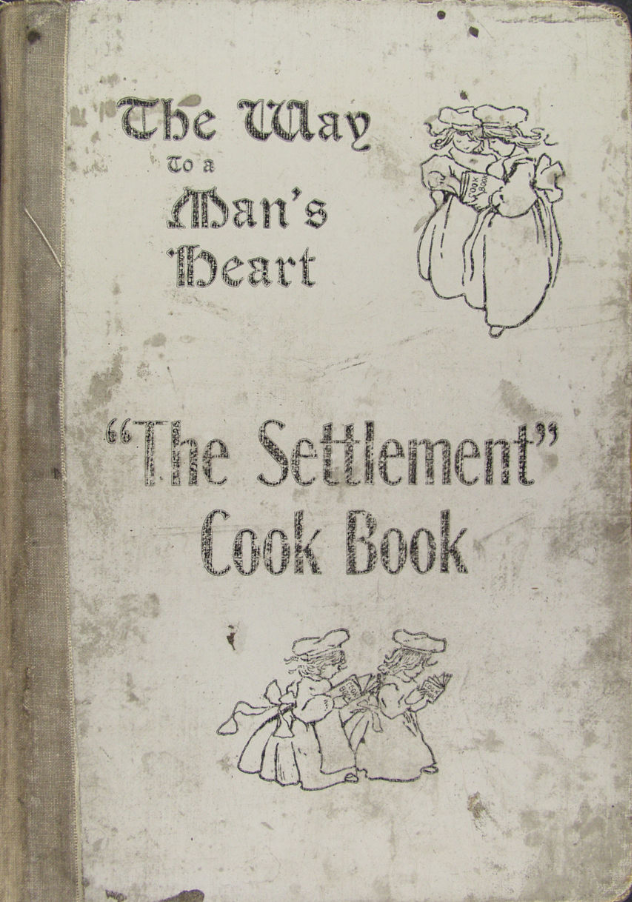
- c1901 (6th edition) cover
- Author: Lizzie Black Kander
- Language: English
- Genre: Cookbook
- Publisher: Settlement House of Milwaukee, Wisconsin
- Publication date: c1901 (1912?)
- Publication place: United States
- Media type: Print (hardcover)
- ISBN: 978-0671220877

The Settlement Cook Book is a complete cookbook and guide to running a household, compiled by Lizzie Black Kander, first published in 1901. The compendium of recipes, cooking techniques, nutrition information, serving procedures and other useful information was intended to support young women raising their families. The context for the cookbook was the Settlement House of Milwaukee, Wisconsin, which served the needs of recent immigrants including many Jewish families arriving from Europe.

The vast scope of the content, and the re-writing process engaged in each year, results in a series of books that contains fascinating information about American culture throughout the 20th century. It was enormously popular within its target audience and became a classic across the U.S., selling two million copies.

The Settlement Cook Book preserved the traditional European dishes (including substantially Jewish dishes), and made them American and modern. Jewish immigrants from Europe found in this book the way to both assimilate and also preserve their culture.

The format of the Settlement book quickly changed from classroom lessons to recipes themselves, arranged by type of food. In addition, instructions were presented, as the audience for this book was new immigrants in the early 1900s. It continued to be reprinted every year for decades, and then was printed every several years for some time after that. The final, 43rd, edition was printed in 1991 by Simon & Schuster, edited by New York food writer Charles Pierce and included an expanded set of recipes.

== History ==
The waves of immigrants (mainly Jewish) arriving in the Milwaukee area prompted various responses. The Settlement House and Lizzie Black Kander responded by doing everything possible to help their new neighbors assimilate successfully and become upstanding citizens. The immigrant community was understood to be a reflection on the more-established Jewish community, so the well-being of the two was connected.

The cookbook was initially printed by Yewdale and Sons on April 1, 1901, in a pamphlet format containing 24 cooking lessons and 500 recipes. The cooking lessons were from cooking classes presented by the Settlement House of Milwaukee, Wisconsin, which served the needs of recent immigrants from Europe, many of whom were Jewish or Italian.

The Board of Trustees refused to pay the original $18 to print 1,000 copies, so Lizzie Black Kander worked with the publisher directly to sell advertisements. Those initial copies (at 50 cents each) sold out, and a new edition with incremental changes was printed again the next year, with advertisements again. The 1,500 copies of the second edition also sold out. The following year, another edition was printed with improvements. Funds raised by sales of the Settlement Cook Book were used to fund activities of the Settlement House activities, provide scholarship funds for students, and support a nursery school.

The Settlement House moved to a bigger space in 1911 and was named the Abraham Lincoln house (later renamed the Milwaukee Jewish Center). By 1925, cookbook royalties added up to $25,000. Community program support was continued, and the building was renamed the Jewish Community Center in 1931. The new location for the Jewish Community Center was financed largely by the Settlement Cook Book sales.

The Settlement Cook Book was intended for the people who were served by the Settlement house, so many dishes were from Eastern Europe. Kander herself was Jewish, and many of the Settlement house population was Jewish, and the cookbook became associated with Jewishness. However its focus was on assimilation, and the contents always included non-kosher foods. In later years, it did include more specifically Jewish content as well, such as Passover recipes in the 1947 edition.

Kander sought to improve The Settlement Cook Book with every new edition, in order to both assist the reader and strengthen the Settlement House itself. Editions sold out, and the book became a classic.

== Contents ==
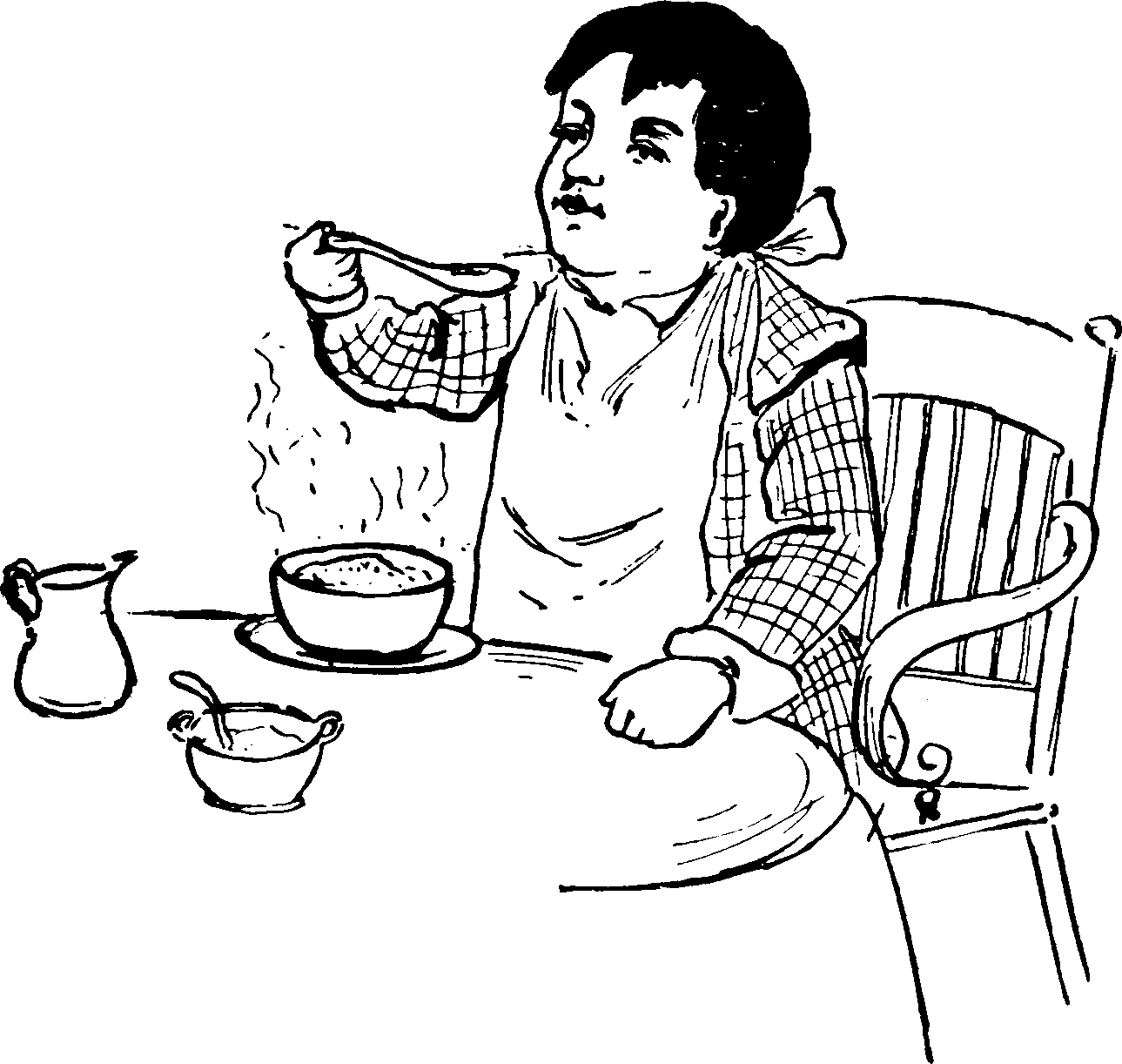
Child eating hot cereal from the 10th edition

=== General ===
The goal of The Settlement Cook Book was to educate recent immigrants on everything necessary to create a healthy kitchen and home. (Note: “..’’The Settlement Cookbook,’’ a classic culinary manual, the purpose of which was to teach American etiquette and gustatory contentions to the impoverished, frequently Jewish immigrants served by settlement houses.”)The book included not only recipes, but also 'Rules for the Household,' with information on cleanliness and logistics. Every step was presented in simple language, and instructions were aimed at the inexperienced cook. Kander and her team actually prepared every recipe, in order to determine actual measurements for each ingredient (which had often not been specified before that time), and to ensure quality. The Settlement Cook Book taught assimilation as well – how ideal Americans should cook and eat their food.

The family focus of the cookbook reflected the belief that a strong, happy family was integral to economic, community and personal happiness. Kander's Jewish background and her commitment to the well-being of the readers led her to create a hybrid cookbook based in regular, American eating habits that included Jewish food as well as non-kosher ingredients. Jewish recipes including kishke, kreplach, meat and dairy borscht, farfel, and cabbage pudding made with goose fat were the essential, eternal menu options. Alongside those were recipes that included pork and shellfish. Readers who wanted to completely assimilate could do that, and readers for whom traditional dishes were meaningful were also addressed. The varied options included chili con carne, chop suey and chow mein.

Kander revised each edition until her death in 1940, and the organization continued publishing it until the 1970s. Since the book was modified each year that it was printed, consecutive editions present a glimpse into the changes in American Life in the 20th century. The recipes themselves spanned both the reader's traditional recipes from their (mainly Jewish) heritage such as 'carrot tzimmes' and 'potato kugel,' as well as the more diverse American menu including 'chicken chop suey for 15 people' and 'Mexican tamales.' Menus were designed for the working-class family with limited means, but there were also "company dishes" that included more expensive ingredients such as lobster. The continually-updated text reflected the path of Jewish cooking in the U.S.

=== Household rules ===
In the 1920 edition, there was not yet a list of utensils, but part of the Household rules section described the 'Window Cold Box' as a means of keeping food cold - a box attached to the home outside of the kitchen window. In that section were also directions for building a fire, and how to use a fireless cooker. In the 1926 edition, the 'List of Utensils' included approximately 100 items, from baking and cooking to utensils, packaging, and cleaning supplies. In the Household rules section were directions for keeping the ice box in working condition (including how to keep the pipes free from sediment from the melting ice). Also included were how to make soap, and instructions regarding window box use.

The 1938 edition's 'List of Utensils' included these sections: 'Pots and Kettles', Baking Utensils', Cooking Utensils', 'Molds' (for desserts mainly), 'Food Containers', 'For Ice Box or Refrigerator', 'Miscellaneous' (mainly cleaning items), 'Canning Equipment', and 'Electric Equipment' with the mixer, roaster, toaster, sandwich toaster and waffle iron. The 'Care of Refrigerator' section in that edition addressed optimal temperature and where to store which foods for electrical refrigerators, defrosting the freezing compartments of iceless refrigerators, and cleaning instructions for ice boxes and refrigerators. There were separate sections on 'Window Box For Keeping Food Cool', 'How to Make Soap', 'A Home Made Fireless Cooker', 'To Use A Fireless Cooker', 'To Start A Wood And Coal Fire', 'Directions For Use Of Modern Gas Range', 'Tanked Or Bottled Gas For Country Homes', 'Directions For Use Of Oil Stove', 'Directions For Use Of Electric Range', and 'Electric Equipment' which addressed the electric roaster, electric beater, and waffle iron. The 'Directions For Use of The Modern Gas Range' included specifics for the top burners, the oven section, and the broiler, efficient use of gas, care of range, and use of a portable thermometer in cases when the oven doesn't have a heat regulator. The section 'To Start A Wood And Coal Fire' was significantly expanded, and included information about the combustible materials, how to coordinate maintaining the fire with cooking/baking activities; and maintenance of the fire-box/stove.

In the 1940 edition the 'iceless refrigerator' mentioned in 'Care of the Refrigerator' became 'Mechanical Refrigerator'. From 1940 to 1944 the Utensil section called 'For Ice Box or Refrigerator' was updated to 'For Refrigerator', and hydrator was added to that section (along with 'Covered Glass Dish for brick butter', 'Covered Ice Box Dishes', Granite or Heavy Glass Pitcher', and 'Glass Water Bottles'.

New in the 1944 edition's 'Tables of Weights And Measures' portion, the equivalent of a 'peck' of additional foods was included, in pounds. The additional foods included were spinach, peas in pods, and tomatoes (potatoes had already been included). As in the past, bushels were translated to pounds for plums, pears, peaches and apples. In the 'Terms Used In Cooking' section, additional terms this edition were marinating (allowing food to stand in French dressing, lemon juice, or in an oil and water mixture), masking (completely covering food with sauce or mayonnaise), and scoring (making light cuts in lines on outer surface). The 'Care of Vacuum Cleaner' section was removed. In the 'Household Rules' section the Refrigerator content continued to be expanded, and specified use of Mechanical Refrigerators, ice refrigerators and ice-boxes. The 1944 edition also had revised content in the section about Use of Electric Range: the surface unit section was expanded and broken into further detail regarding boiling, frying, and 'deep well, or thrift cooker' (which had been its own section). The oven section was updated, and information on the broiler was split out into its own section.

New 'Terms Used in Cooking' in the 1951 edition included dredging (coating lightly with flour), parboiling (boiling until food is partially cooked), and 'to puree' - (pressing food through sieve or ricer). In the 'List of Cooking Utensils' - 'For Refrigerator' section, the hydrator was omitted, and the 'Granite or Heavy Glass Pitcher' became 'Enameled or Heavy Glass Pitcher'.

=== Specific editions ===
The 1915 edition contained a special Liberty supplement with recipes addressing the expected food shortages of World War I. Some examples are meat-less entrees like Vegetable Hash and Mutton with Eggplant and desserts reconstituted to avoid wheat and sugar.

There was a beverage section during prohibition with various creations, and then after prohibition the cook book included mixed drinks and punch recipes.

The 1944 (26th) edition was the 'Victory' edition.

As the book continued to have a loyal audience, the quantity of Jewish recipes increased. Dishes were added such as brisket and carrot tsimmes, chremsel (matzo fritters), matzo spice sponge cake, and kishke.

== Reception ==
The focus of The Settlement Cook Book was always on simple effectiveness in the kitchen and the whole household. All techniques were explained in every edition, terms were defined, nutritional information was also included. The techniques provided were useful not only for cooking, but for fitting in to the American ethos. It taught how to belong in the U.S.

The result was widespread popularity over the years that also extended to well-known cooks such as M. F. K. Fisher, Joan Nathan and Leah Koenig. (Note: Marcus noted its generational popularity in 1981 by stating, “It is no great exaggeration to maintain that this book rivals beer as Milwaukee's most notable product.”) (Note: Joan Nathan, Jewish cooking archivist, journalist, and cookbook author has 18 copies (plus or minus) because "It was the cookbook my mother always used.") (Note: Joan's mother was given a copy in 1937 as a wedding gift. "She always looks at it for recipes, even though I've written nine cookbooks," Nathan says. "She considers it her Bible.") (Note: Leah Koenig, Jewish cookbook author and food writer, grew up with a well-worn copy of Settlement Cookbook always nearby, that her grandmother received as a wedding shower gift in Minneapolis 1940. "It was the gift to give back then" her mother said.")

For the Jewish community, it was a recognition that their culture was included in American culture. Nora Rubel, who teaches the history of religion at the University of Rochester in New York, says, ".. there's something very compelling about that. This is our tradition and it's part of this grand tapestry of American culinary ideas." Lauren Hoffman, for the Jewish online magazine Hey Alma, commented that the cookbook wants to be both American and Jewish, "it wants to be elegant and refined, it wants to be heimish and it wants — needs — to be useful, above all. [...] It distills the deep fear about — and earnest desire for — assimilation and its requirements. This book was a how-to guide for American Hyphenate survival, anxiously pursued and guided by women on behalf of their families."

The cookbook has forty editions and over two million copies sold.

James Beard, when asked for the name of his favorite cookbook, replied "If I consult a cookbook at all, it is likely to be one of these sensible, flat-heeled authors like the famous Mrs. Kander."

== Publication history ==
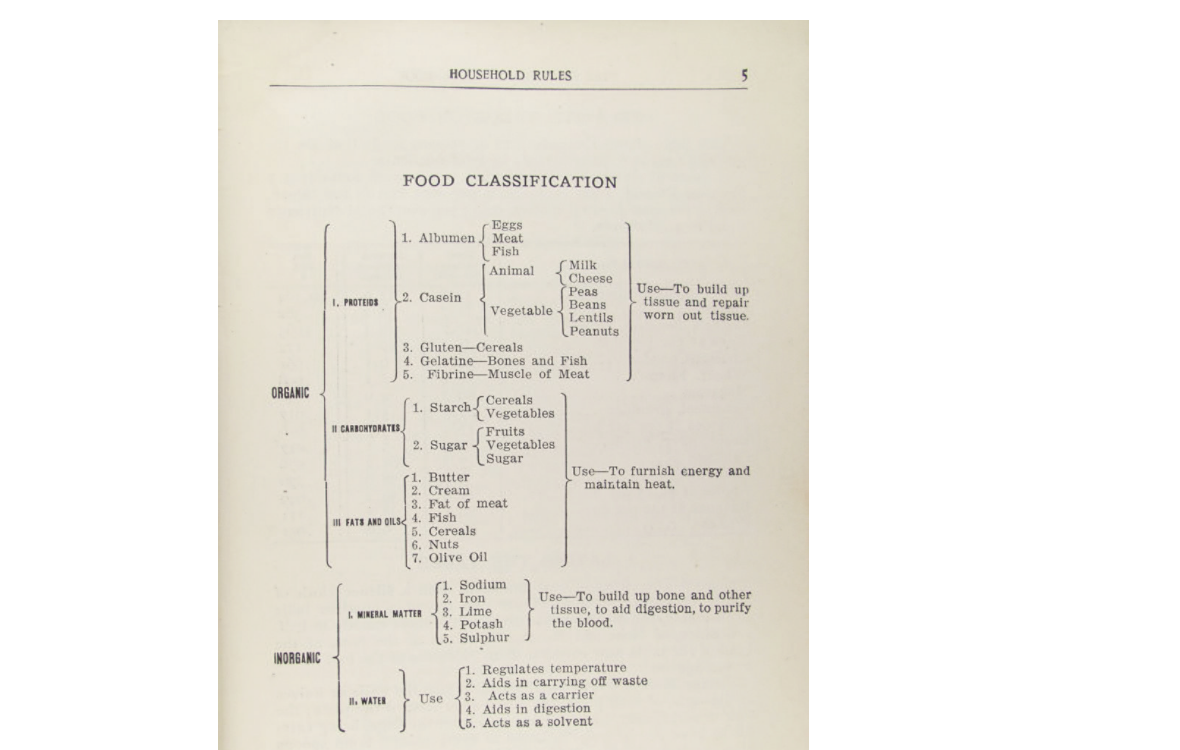
Nutrition Info T.S.C

- Kander, Mrs. Simon, The Settlement cook book : containing many recipes used in Settlement cooking classes, the Milwaukee public school cooking centers and gathered from various other reliable sources 1901
- Kander, Mrs. Simon, The Settlement Cook Book: The way to a man's heart (1901)
- Kander, Mrs. Simon and Mrs. Henry Schoenfeld, The "Settlement" cook book : The way to a man's heart (1903) 2nd ed 182 p.
- Kander, Mrs. Simon, Mrs. Nathan Hamburger and Mrs. I.D. Adler, The Settlement cook book (1907) 3rd ed 391 p.
- Kander, Mrs. Simon, Mrs. Nathan Hamburger and Mrs. I.D. Adler, The Settlement cook book (1910) 4th ed 452 p.
- Kander, Mrs. Simon, Mrs. Nathan Hamburger, Mrs. Henry Schoenfeld, and Mrs. Isaac D. Adler, The Settlement cook book (1912) 5th ed 452 p.
- Kander, Mrs. Simon, Mrs. Nathan Hamburger and Mrs. I.D. Adler The Settlement cook book (1915) 7th ed 488 p.
- Kander, Mrs. Simon, Mrs. Nathan Hamburger, Mrs. I.D. Adler and Mrs. Sol Cantrovitz, The Settlement cook book (1915) 8th ed enlarged and revised 509 p.
- Kander, Mrs. Simon, Mrs. Nathan Hamburger, Mrs. I.D. Adler and Mrs. Sol Cantrovitz, The Settlement cook book (1915) 9th ed w/ Liberty supplement 534 p.
- Kander, Mrs. Simon, The Settlement cook book (1920) 10th ed enl and rev 563 p.
- Kander, Mrs. Simon, The Settlement cook book (1921) 11th ed enl and rev 596 p.
- Kander, Mrs. Simon, The Settlement cook book (1921) 12th ed enl and rev 596 p.
- Kander, Mrs. Simon, The Settlement cook book (1924) 13th ed enl and rev 623 p.
- Kander, Mrs. Simon, The Settlement cook book (1925) 14th ed enl and rev 624 p.
- Kander, Mrs. Simon, The Settlement cook book (1926) 15th ed enl and rev 624 p.
- Kander, Mrs. Simon, The Settlement cook book (1927) 16th ed enl and rev 624 p.
- Kander, Mrs. Simon, The Settlement cook book (1928) 17th ed enl and rev 624 p.
- Kander, Mrs. Simon, The Settlement cook book (1930) 18th ed enl and rev 624 p.
- Kander, Mrs. Simon, The Settlement cook book (1931) 19th ed enl and rev 624 p.
- Kander, Mrs. Simon, The Settlement cook book - 'repeal' recipes (1933) 16 p.
- Kander, Mrs. Simon, The Settlement cook book (1934) 20th ed enl and rev 624 p.
- Kander, Mrs. Simon, The Settlement cook book (1936) 21st ed enl and rev 623 p.
- Kander, Mrs. Simon, The Settlement cook book (1938) 22nd ed enl and rev 623 p.
- Kander, Mrs. Simon, The Settlement cook book (1940) 23rd ed enl and rev 623 p.
- Kander, Mrs. Simon, The Settlement cook book (1941) 24th ed enl and rev 623 p.
- Kander, Mrs. Simon, The Settlement cook book (1943) 25th ed enl and rev 623 p.
- Kander, Mrs. Simon, The Settlement cook book (1944) 26th ed enl and rev 623 p.
- Kander, Mrs. Simon, The Settlement cook book (1945) 27th ed enl and rev 623 p.
- Kander, Mrs. Simon, The Settlement cook book (1947) 28th ed enl and rev 623 p.
- Kander, Mrs. Simon, The Settlement cook book (1949) 29th ed enl and rev 623 p.
- Kander, Mrs. Simon, The Settlement cook book (1951) 30th ed enl and rev 624 p.
- Kander, Mrs. Simon, The Settlement cook book (1954) 31st ed enl and rev 676 p.
- Kander, Mrs. Simon, The heart of The settlement cook book; a special selection of home-tested recipes compiled from the omnibus edition famous for three generations. (1958) 32nd ed 312 p.
- Kander, Mrs. Simon, The Settlement cook book: treasured recipes of six decades; the famous all-purpose cook book for beginner and expert (1965) 33rd ed 535 p.
- Kander, Mrs. Simon, and Mrs. Henry Schoenfeld, The Settlement cookbook, 1903 : the way to a man's heart (1987) fascim. ed. 182 p.
- Pierce, Charles, The New settlement cookbook (1991) completely rev. and updated ed. 814 p.
