= Andrew Blunt =

American political consultant

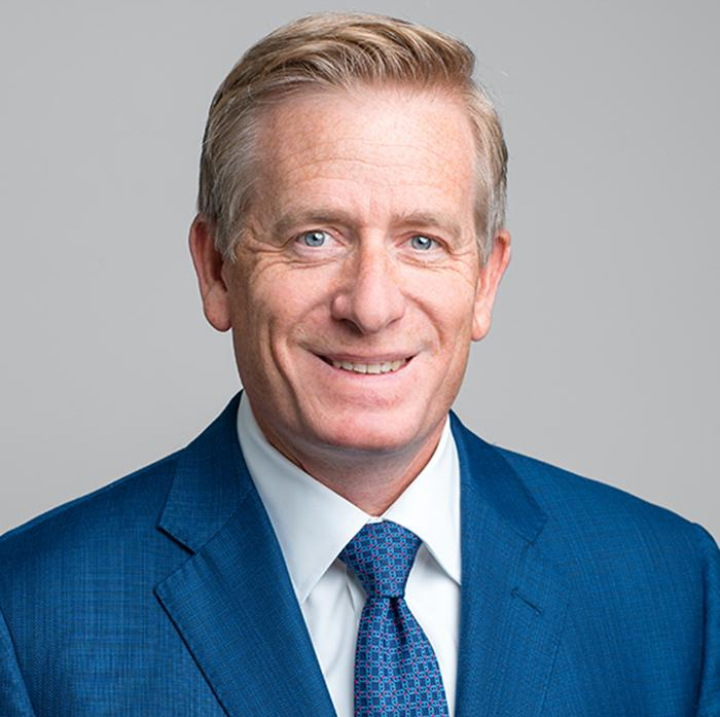
- Born: Andrew Blunt; Springfield, Missouri, U.S.
- Education: Southwest Baptist University (BS); University of Missouri (JD)
- Occupations: Political consultant, lobbyist, attorney
- Years active: 2000–present
- Employer: Husch Blackwell Strategies
- Known for: Political consulting and government affairs
- Title: Chief Executive Officer and Executive Chairman
- Parent: Roy Blunt
- Relatives: Matt Blunt (brother)

Andrew Blunt is the chief executive officer and executive chairman for HBS: Hartley Blunt Strategies, formerly HB Strategies and Husch Blackwell Strategies. He is the son of former U.S. Senator Roy Blunt and the brother of former Missouri Governor Matt Blunt.

== Early life and education ==
Born in Springfield, Missouri, Andy moved to Jefferson City with the rest of the Blunt family when his father, Roy Blunt, was elected as Missouri Secretary of State. When Andy was in college, his father Roy ran for the United States Congress. Simultaneous to building his business, Blunt has served as the principal political advisor to his brother and father as well as to Mike Kehoe. Andy holds a Juris Doctor degree from the University of Missouri School of Law in Columbia, Missouri. He received a Bachelor of Science degree from Southwest Baptist University in Bolivar, Missouri.

== Professional life ==
=== Hartley Blunt Strategies ===
Blunt is the CEO of HBS, a national lobbying and public affairs. The firm was established in 2018 as Husch Blackwell Strategies with the merger of three government affairs practices of Husch Blackwell LLP, Statehouse Strategies LLC, and Cloakroom Advisors LLC. In February 2025 the firm was at the time affiliated with Husch Blackwell LLP became independent and rebranded as Hartley Blunt Strategies.

HBS has twelve offices nationwide, in Arizona, Arkansas, Colorado, Kansas, Maryland, Missouri, Nebraska, Oklahoma, Texas, Wisconsin, and a federal practice group in Washington, as well as the HBS Public Affairs group. U.S. Senator Roy Blunt chairs the firmʻs Leadership Strategies Advisory Services group in Washington.

Bloomberg Government included HBS in its annual list of Top-Performing Lobbying Firms in Washington ranking it 51 of 360 firms that reported $1.3 million or more in annual revenue. HBS has been included on the list since the firm was established in 2018 when Bloomberg named it Top New Startup that year.

=== Lawyer and lobbyist ===
In 2000, Andy Blunt began his career as a political strategist, leading his brother Matt's successful bid for Secretary of State of Missouri. In 2002, Blunt became a founding partner of law firm Schreimann, Rackers, Francka & Blunt, LLC. In 2016 Blunt began Statehouse Strategies LCC, a lobbying firm that focused on the Missouri General Assembly. In 2018, Statehouse Strategies and Cloakroom Advisors, LCC announced a joint venture, Husch Blackwell Strategies, LLC, a national government relations firm headquartered in Jefferson City, Missouri.

The Missouri Times named Blunt one of the 100+ people to know in Missouri politics for the previous four years, stating, "If this list was the 5+ [people to know], Andy Blunt would still be on it." Blunt's extensive client list has been credited by some to his diverse range of experiences and relationships at the Missouri state capital, while others assert that his clients are attracted to the influence he has on his father. Blunt has been named as one of the top lobbyists in Washington, D.C. by The Hill on its annual list since 2021.

=== Campaign manager ===
In 2004, Blunt built on his campaign management electoral success by managing his brother's successful campaign for governor. In 2010, Blunt managed his father's campaign for U.S. Senate, featuring two notable families in Missouri politics. Then Congressman Roy Blunt defeated then-Secretary of State Robin Carnahan by 14 points. The campaign carried 112 of Missouri's 114 counties, leading Senator Blunt to a winning margin of 14 percent, the largest midterm win in a Missouri Senate race since 1994. Politico called it one of the Top 10 campaigns in the country in 2010. Andy Blunt managed his father's successful campaign for re-election to the United States Senate in 2016. The 2016 race was one of the most competitive in the country where Senator Roy Blunt defeated a rising star in the Democratic Party that featured three visits to the state by then Vice President Joe Biden.

== FEC inquiry ==
In 2016, the Federal Election Commission has asked questions pertaining to Blunt's management of two Political Action Committees that contributed to his father's 2016 Senate re-election campaign. The FEC dismissed those assertions finding no wrongdoing.
