= 2004 Missouri gubernatorial election =

- November 2, 2004
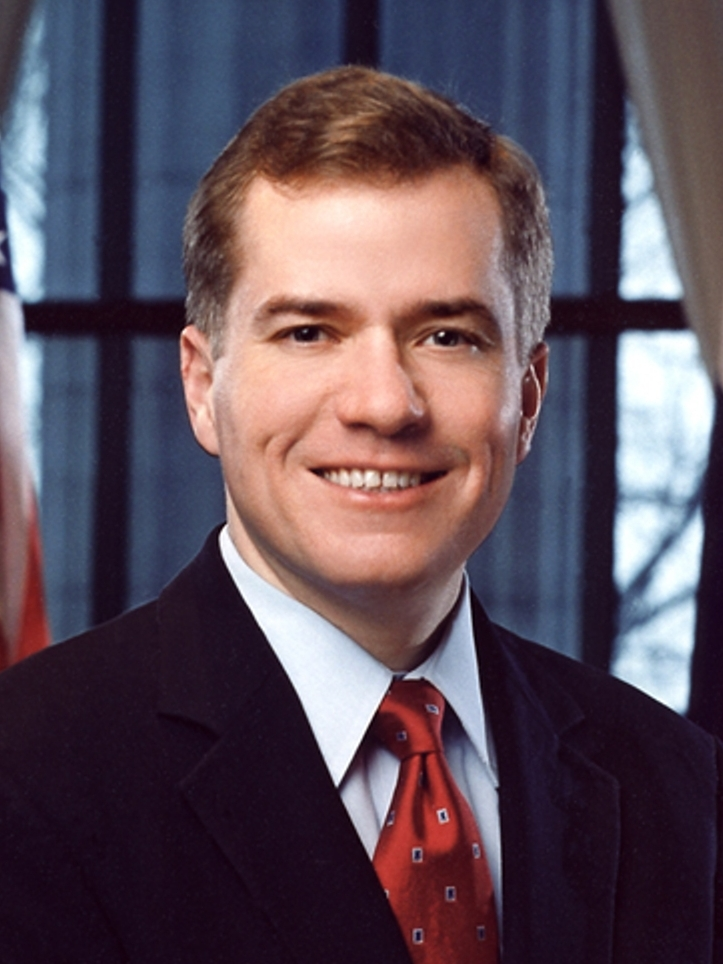

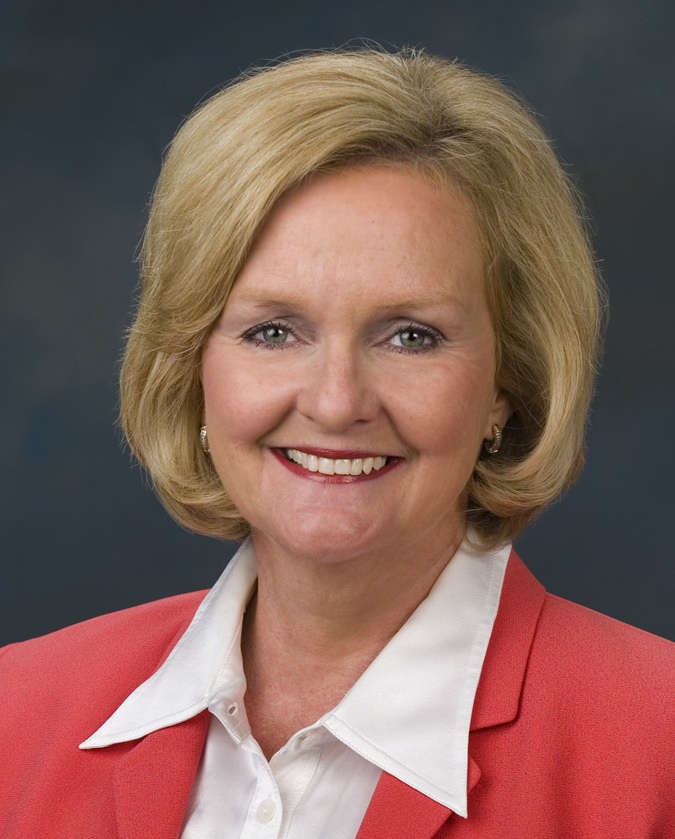
| Nominee | Matt Blunt | Claire McCaskill |
| Party | Republican | Democratic |
| Popular vote | 1,382,419 | 1,301,442 |
| Percentage | 50.83% | 47.85% |
- County results Blunt: 50–60% 60–70% 70–80% McCaskill: 40–50% 50–60% 60–70% 70–80%
Governor before election
Bob Holden
Democratic
Elected Governor
Matt Blunt
Republican

The 2004 Missouri gubernatorial election was held on November 2, 2004, for the post of Governor of Missouri. The Republican nominee, Missouri Secretary of State Matt Blunt, defeated Democratic State Auditor Claire McCaskill. This gave the Republican Party control of both the governorship and the Missouri General Assembly for the first time in 80 years.

McCaskill had earlier defeated incumbent Governor Bob Holden in the Democratic primary. This was the first time a sitting governor of Missouri had ever been defeated in a primary, and the first time any United States governor had lost in a primary since the 1994 elections.

Coincidentally, McCaskill's mother Betty Anne had previously been defeated by Blunt's grandfather, Leroy Blunt, in a 1978 election for the state house. Blunt's father, Roy Blunt, was a U.S. representative and later served with McCaskill in the U.S. Senate from 2011 to 2019.

== Republican primary ==
=== Campaign ===
Missouri Secretary of State Matt Blunt faced only token opposition in the Republican primary, easily defeating several lesser known opponents.

=== Results ===
Republican primary results
| Party | Candidate | Votes | % |
|---|---|---|---|
| Republican | Matt Blunt | 534,393 | 68.28 |
| Republican | Karen Skelton-Memhardt | 126,089 | 20.85 |
| Republican | Jen Sievers | 18,733 | 3.10 |
| Republican | Jeff Killian | 10,423 | 1.72 |
| Republican | Roy W. Lang | 8,750 | 1.45 |
| Republican | Martin Lindstedt | 6,369 | 1.05 |
| Total votes | | 604,757 | 100 |

== Democratic primary ==
=== Campaign ===
Bob Holden had a difficult term as Missouri governor, starting at his inauguration on January 8, 2001, which cost $1 million, and which he struggled to pay for. The state economy suffered a downturn forcing him to make budget cuts and the Republican party gained control of the State Senate for the first time in 50 years. Holden was nicknamed by his opponents as "One Term Bob".

Holden announced that he would run for re-election in March 2003, blaming the Republican party for many of the problems during his term as governor. However, Holden was challenged by State Auditor Claire McCaskill for the Democratic nomination, who said that she would be a stronger candidate in the general election against Blunt.

McCaskill attacked Holden for delays in education funding, the state's deteriorating roads and increases in tuition fees at Missouri's universities. Holden sought to defend his term in office and attacked McCaskill for the people she accepted campaign contributions from. McCaskill picked up most newspaper endorsements during the primary, and won the primary on August 3 against Holden.

=== Results ===
Democratic primary results
| Party | Candidate | Votes | % |
|---|---|---|---|
| Democratic | Claire McCaskill | 437,780 | 51.64 |
| Democratic | Bob Holden (incumbent) | 383,734 | 45.27 |
| Democratic | Jim LePage | 16,761 | 1.98 |
| Democratic | Jeffery A. Emrick | 9,473 | 1.12 |
| Total votes | | 847,748 | 100 |

== General election ==
=== Campaign ===
After the primaries finished Holden and McCaskill met to unite the Democratic party for the general election for what was always seen as being a close race against Blunt.

The first of two debates between Blunt and McCaskill was held on 18 October. McCaskill compared her experience to Blunt's inexperience, while Blunt said that McCaskill would not support the marriage protection amendment to the State Constitution. In the two debates, Blunt described himself as bringing change to Missouri and was assisted by President George W. Bush during the campaign. McCaskill kept her distance from Democratic presidential candidate John Kerry, due to Bush's lead in Missouri.

In the end, Blunt narrowly defeated McCaskill, with surveys showing that his conservative stance on social issues and the strong showing of President Bush in Missouri helped him to victory. Blunt obtained strong leads in the rural parts of the state, as well as the large cities of southwest Missouri, Springfield and Joplin, which was sufficient to overcome McCaskill's leads in St. Louis and Jackson County. Blunt thus became Missouri's second youngest governor.

=== Predictions ===
| Source | Ranking | As of |
|---|---|---|
| Sabato's Crystal Ball | Lean R (flip) | November 1, 2004 |

=== Polling ===
| Poll source | Date(s) administered | Sample size (Note: Key: A – all adults RV – registered voters LV – likely voters V – unclear) | Margin of error | Claire McCaskill (D) | Matt Blunt (R) | Other / Undecided |
|---|---|---|---|---|---|---|
| SurveyUSA | October 29–31, 2004 | 689 (LV) | ± 3.8% | 47% | 47% | 5% |

=== Results ===
Missouri gubernatorial election, 2004
| Party | Candidate | Votes | % | ±% |
|---|---|---|---|---|
| Republican | Matt Blunt | 1,382,419 | 50.83% | +2.63% |
| Democratic | Claire McCaskill | 1,301,442 | 47.85% | −1.27% |
| Libertarian | John Swenson | 24,378 | 0.90% | +0.42% |
| Constitution | Robert Wells | 11,299 | 0.42% | +0.28% |
| Majority | | 80,977 | 2.98% | +2.06% |
| Turnout | | 2,719,538 | 64.8 | +4.0 |
| Republican gain from Democratic | | Swing | | |

==== Counties that flipped from Republican to Democratic ====
- Platte (largest city: Kansas City)

==== Counties that flipped from Democratic to Republican ====
- Audrain (largest city: Mexico)
- Clark (largest city: Kahoka)
- Monroe (largest city: Monroe City)
- Gentry (largest city: Albany)
- Oregon (largest city: Thayer)
- Buchanan (largest city: St. Joseph)
- St. Francois (largest city: Farmington)
- Reynolds (largest city: Ellington)
- Washington (largest city: Potosi)
- Iron (largest city: Ironton)
- Shannon (largest city: Winona)
- Bates (largest city: Butler)
- Chariton (largest city: Salisbury)
- Dunklin (largest city: Kennett)
- Nodaway (largest city: Maryville)
- Pike (largest city: Bowling Green)
- Howard (largest city: Fayette)
- Henry (largest city: Clinton)
- Hickory (largest city: Hermitage)
- Ralls (largest city: Hannibal)
- Randolph (largest city: Moberly)
- Linn (largest city: Brookfield)
- Callaway (largest city: Fulton)
