= Busiek =

Busiek is a surname. Notable people with the surname include:

- Kurt Busiek (born 1960), American comic book writer
- Paul Busiek (1923–2016), American doctor and politician
