= Matt Blunt =

American politician (born 1970)

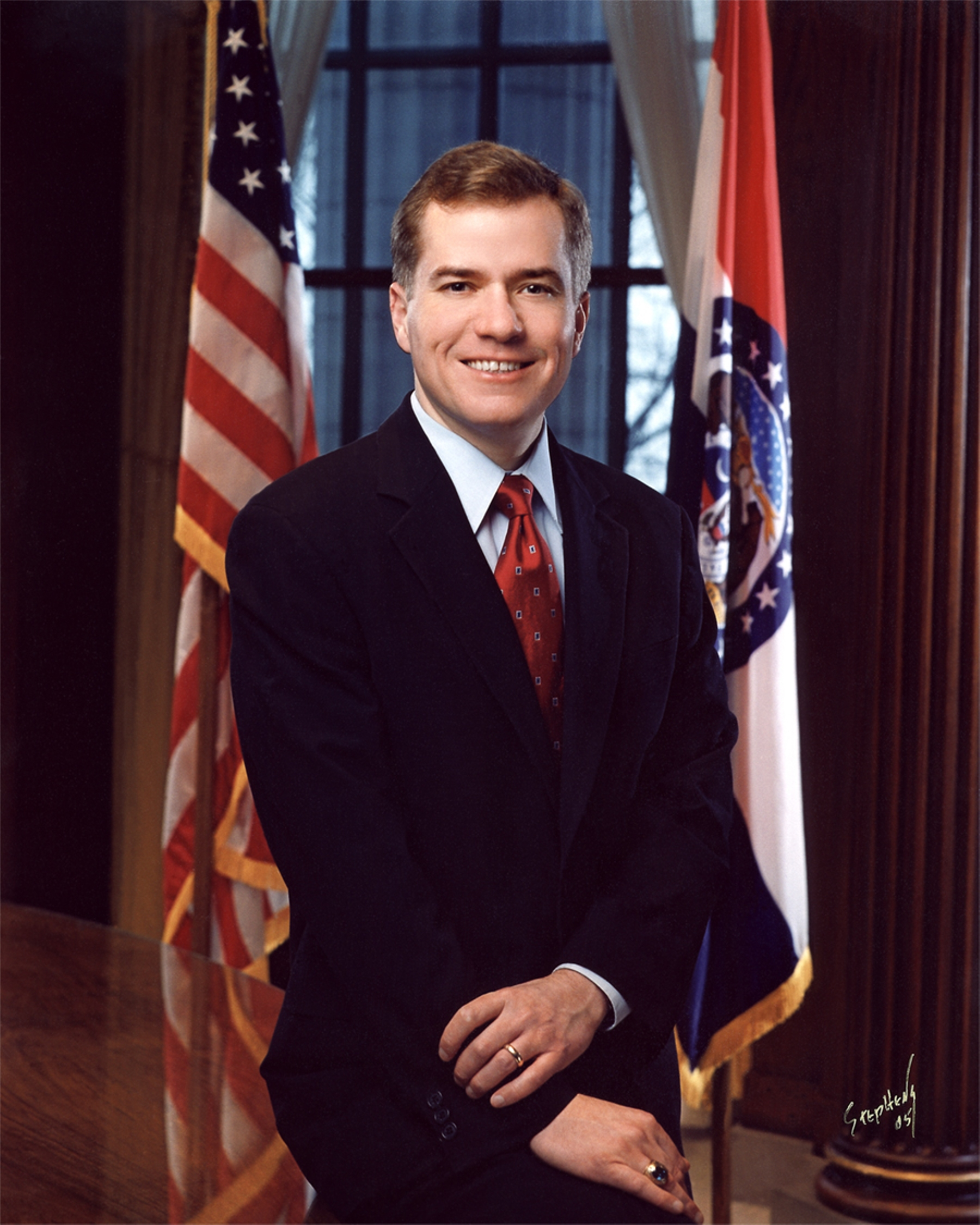
- Official portrait, 2005

54th Governor of Missouri
- In office January 10, 2005 – January 12, 2009
- Lieutenant: Peter Kinder
- Preceded by: Bob Holden
- Succeeded by: Jay Nixon

37th Secretary of State of Missouri
- In office January 8, 2001 – January 10, 2005
- Governor: Bob Holden
- Preceded by: Bekki Cook
- Succeeded by: Robin Carnahan

Member of the Missouri House of Representatives from the 139th district
- In office January 6, 1999 – January 8, 2001
- Preceded by: Phillip Wannemacher
- Succeeded by: Brad Roark

Personal details
- Born: Matthew Roy Blunt; November 20, 1970 (age 55) Greene County, Missouri, U.S.
- Party: Republican
- Spouse: Melanie Anderson (m. 1997)
- Children: 2
- Relatives: Roy Blunt (father); Andrew Blunt (brother); Leroy Blunt (grandfather)
- Education: United States Naval Academy (BS)

Military service
- Allegiance: United States
- Branch/service: United States Navy
- Rank: Lieutenant Commander
- Battles/wars: Operation Support Democracy; Operation Enduring Freedom
- Awards: Navy and Marine Corps Achievement Medal (4)

Matthew Roy Blunt (born November 20, 1970) is an American politician who served as the 54th governor of Missouri from 2005 to 2009. He previously served ten years in the United States Navy and as Missouri secretary of state.

Blunt won the 2004 Missouri gubernatorial election as the Republican nominee against Democratic nominee Claire McCaskill. The election coincided with elections in the Missouri General Assembly, where Republicans maintained their majority; this made Blunt the first Republican governor of Missouri to serve with a Republican legislature in 84 years, making his policy proposals easier to accomplish. At age 33, he also became the second-youngest person ever elected governor of Missouri after Kit Bond. Blunt did not seek a second term as governor, announcing his decision on January 22, 2008. Blunt was the only Republican to be elected Governor from 1988 to 2016.

After working as a consultant, Blunt was hired as the president of the American Automotive Policy Council in 2011, representing the auto lobby in Washington, D.C. His father, Roy Blunt, has served in a variety of political offices, including as Missouri secretary of state and congressman, and in the U.S. Senate from 2011 to 2023.

== Early life and education ==
Born in 1970 in Greene County, Missouri, Blunt is the son of politician Roy Blunt and his first wife Roseann Ray Blunt. The senior Blunt was first elected to office in 1984 as secretary of state for Missouri. He was elected as U.S. representative in 1997 and as U.S. senator in 2010. After graduating from Jefferson City High School in Jefferson City, Missouri, Matt Blunt was accepted into the United States Naval Academy, where he received a bachelor's degree in history in 1993.

Blunt and his wife Melanie were married in May 1997. The couple has two sons. Blunt is a member of the State Historical Society of Missouri, the American Legion, and the Missouri Farm Bureau.

== Naval career ==
As an officer in the United States Navy, Blunt served as an engineering officer aboard the USS Jack Williams and as the navigator and administrative officer on the destroyer USS Peterson.

His active duty service included participation in Operation Uphold Democracy, involving the United Nations blockade of Haiti, missions to interdict drug traffic off the South American coast, and on duties involved in the interdiction of Cuban migrants in 1994. During his Naval career, Blunt received numerous commendations, including four Navy and Marine Corps Achievement medals. He entered the Navy Reserve.

Following the September 11, 2001 attacks, Blunt was called back into active naval service, after he had been elected to the office of secretary of state for Missouri. He completed a six-month tour of duty in Great Britain during Operation Enduring Freedom, during which time he continued to work full-time for the state as well. He was a Lieutenant Commander in the Navy Reserve.

== Early political career ==
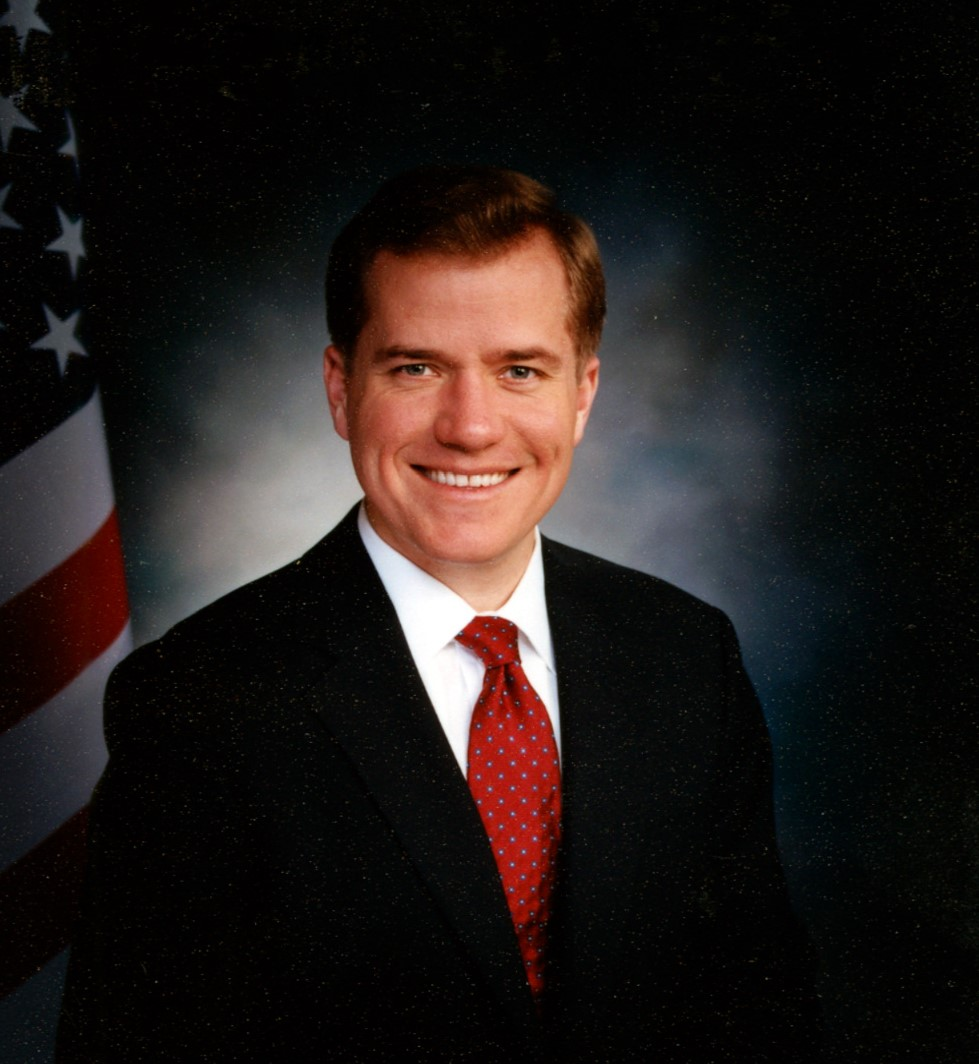
Portrait of Blunt, 2003

In 1998, Blunt was elected as a Republican to the Missouri House of Representatives to represent the 139th legislative district for a two-year term. In 2000, he was elected Missouri Secretary of State; although only a first-term state representative, Blunt defeated the Democratic Speaker of the Missouri House of Representatives, Steve Gaw, with 51.4% of the vote to Gaw's 45.1%. Blunt was 29 on election day, November 7, 2000, and 30 at the time he assumed office, making him the youngest person ever to win statewide office in Missouri. His father had been elected to the same office at age 34. Blunt was the only Republican elected to statewide office in Missouri in 2000.

In August 2001, as secretary of state, Blunt traveled to Israel along with a delegation of Republicans led by his father, Roy, to meet with Israeli prime minister Ariel Sharon. He promoted a state election reform bill in 2002, which won support of the Republican-controlled Senate and Democratic House. In 2004, Blunt required all electronic voting machines purchased by the state to produce a voter-verified paper ballot.

== Governor of Missouri ==
=== 2004 election ===
Blunt faced only token opposition in the Republican primary, which he won with 534,393 votes (68.28%). In the general election, he faced Missouri State Auditor Claire McCaskill, who had defeated incumbent governor Bob Holden in the Democratic primary.

The first of two debates between Blunt and McCaskill was held on 18 October where McCaskill compared her experience to Blunt's inexperience; while Blunt said that McCaskill would not support the Marriage protection amendment to the State Constitution. In the two debates Blunt described himself as bringing change to Missouri and was assisted by President George W. Bush during the campaign. McCaskill kept her distance from Democratic presidential candidate John Kerry due to Bush's lead in Missouri.

In the end Blunt narrowly defeated McCaskill with surveys showing his conservative stance on social issues and the strong showing of President Bush in Missouri helped him to victory. Blunt obtained strong leads in the rural parts of the state which was sufficient to overcome McCaskill's leads in St. Louis and Jackson County. Blunt defeated McCaskill by 1,382,419 votes (50.83%) to 1,301,442 (47.85%) and thus became Missouri's second-youngest Governor.

=== Tenure ===
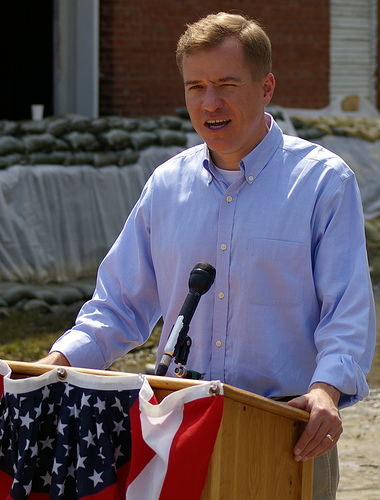
Governor Matt Blunt visits Louisiana

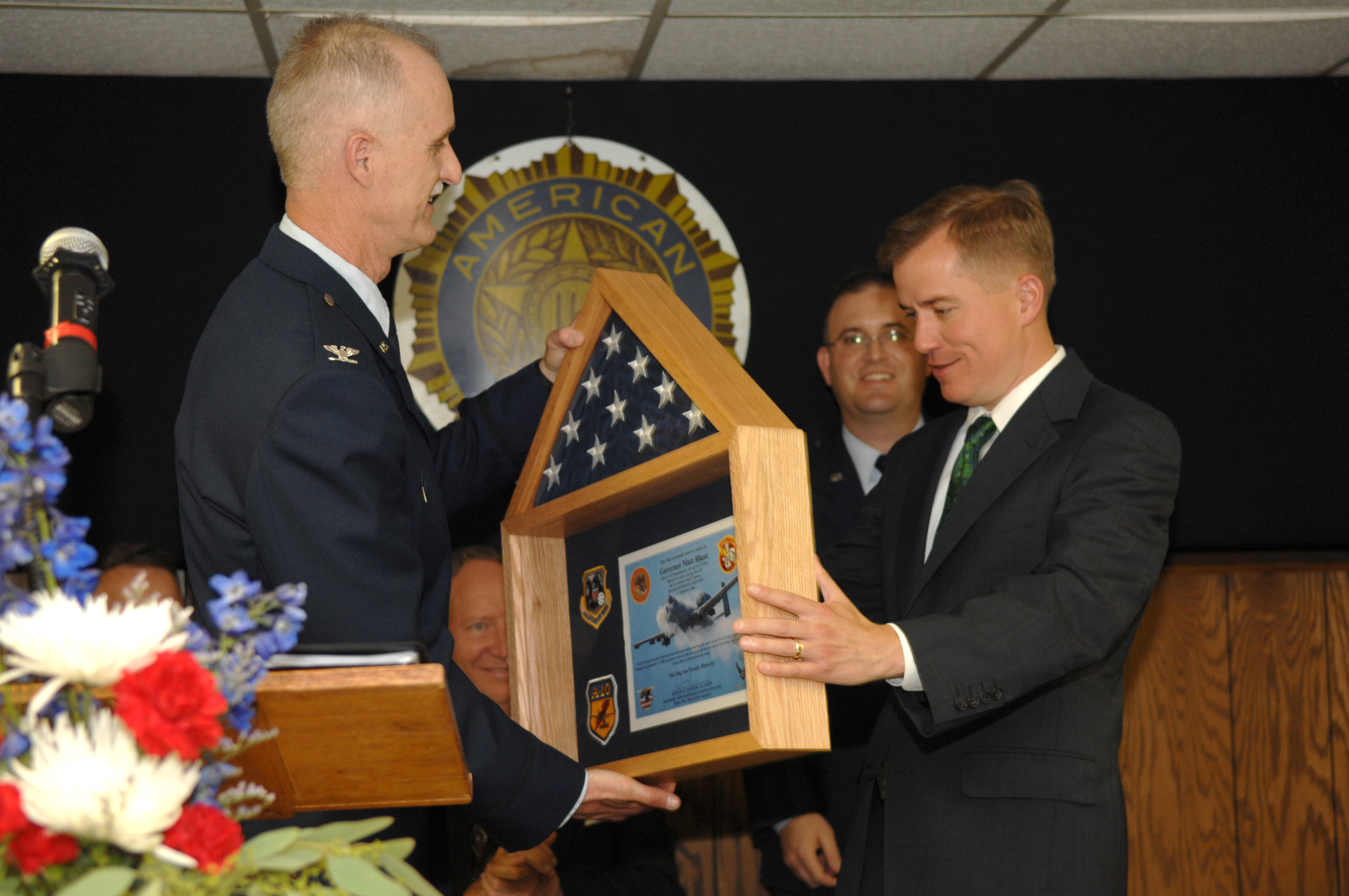
Col. Steve Arthur presents Missouri Governor Matt Blunt with an American flag flown on a combat mission over Afghanistan and certificate following a bill-signing ceremony in Warrensburg, Missouri in 2008

When Blunt took office on January 10, 2005, it was the first time in Missouri since 1921 that a Republican held the governor's office with Republican majorities in both houses of the state legislature. Blunt and his allies in the Missouri General Assembly moved quickly to enact legislation that they said would create a positive business climate in the state and result in job growth.

With legislative support, Blunt claimed in 2009 that he had enacted almost all of his policy proposals. Among the legislation passed were tort reform measures that overhauled the state's legal system, and changes in the state's workers compensation laws.

Blunt's first year in office was difficult, and he was criticized by both the right and the left. In February 2006, a poll conducted by SurveyUSA showed him with a 33% job approval rating, the fifth lowest of any governor in the nation. His approval among Republicans polled was 62%, but his rating among Democrats was only 12%. This was one of the greatest partisan divides of any governor.

In September 2009, the state insurance agency issued a report showing medical malpractice claims in Missouri at a 30-year low in 2008, believed to result from Blunt's restriction of injury settlements under tort reform in 2005. "...Missouri's medical malpractice insurers made a profit for the fifth straight year in 2008. It also shows an increase in the number of medical providers getting insurance through nonprofit coalitions."

=== Fiscal policy ===
Blunt believed he had to reduce spending to deal with what he described as a state financial crisis. He trimmed state spending in order to keep the budget balanced without raising taxes. Particularly controversial were provisions reducing coverage of programs created by state legislation to provide a social net, especially to families.

Two years later, with an election almost a year away, Governor Blunt implemented the MO HealthNet Initiative, Senate Bill SB577. This was intended to offer residents more choices and rewards for healthy behavior. Some citizens were deemed qualified again for Medicaid coverage.

In July 2007, Blunt signed an executive order launching the Missouri Accountability Portal (MAP), which provides Missourians with free, immediate, online information about how the state spends taxpayer money.

Blunt signed into law tax cuts. Blunt created the Quality Jobs program, an initiative has been expanded by his successor, Governor Jay Nixon.

In 2005, Blunt and the Republican-controlled Missouri General Assembly enacted an overhaul of the state workers' compensation system, making it more difficult for employees to obtain workers' compensation benefits. The overhaul was supported by business interests and opposed by labor unions. Also in 2005, Blunt signed into law "tort reform" legislation that limited the damages that juries could award in medical malpractice, placed a cap on punitive damages, lowered the maximum amount that juries could award in non-economic damages, and repealed Missouri's shared liability law. In 2012, the Missouri Supreme Court struck down the cap on medical malpractice damages, ruling that the measure infringed "on the jury's constitutionally protected purpose of determining the amount of damages sustained by an injured party."

=== Legislative initiatives ===
Blunt provided annual increases in state funding for K-12 education, signed legislation authorizing $335 million for college construction, expanded college scholarships, and enacted a new school funding method. Blunt proposed selling Missouri's student loan agency, known as MOHELA, and using the proceeds to pay for endowments and new construction for the state's public universities. In the area of elementary and secondary education, Blunt proposed that school districts be required to spend at least 65% of their budgets on student instruction. After the proposal was criticized, Blunt suggested that the 65% threshold should be a goal, rather than a mandate.

Blunt signed bills to expand Missouri's right-to-carry firearms. At the NRA's annual meeting, held in St. Louis in 2007, Blunt signed legislation prohibiting the seizure of firearms during declared states of emergency.

Blunt opposed abortion except in cases of rape, incest, and to save the life of the mother. He supported measures to prevent the ban on research regarding somatic cell nuclear transfer. There were efforts to pass such a ban in the Missouri General Assembly during the 2005 session. Disagreements among Republicans over the stem cell issue held up efforts to pass restrictions on abortion, such as a 24-hour waiting period, and a restriction on helping minors cross state lines to avoid Missouri's parental consent requirement. In September 2005, Blunt called a special session of the General Assembly specifically to address abortion. The General Assembly passed the above-noted restrictions, and Blunt signed them into law. Blunt supported measures that would allow pharmacists to refuse to fill prescriptions for emergency contraception, in contrast to Illinois, which enacted legislation requiring pharmacies as public businesses to fill such prescriptions.

In 2005, Blunt signed legislation to limit sales of pseudoephedrine and ephedrine products, the key ingredients needed to make methamphetamine. In the 2006 legislative session, Blunt's stated priorities included enacting a version of "Jessica's Law," requiring a minimum 25-year sentence for child sex offenders, as one of his legislative priorities. In 2008, Blunt signed legislation requiring ignition interlocks for drunk drivers who commit two or more drunk driving offenses. He signed legislation to lower the legal intoxication limit for boaters from .10 to .08 percent.

Blunt ended localities' reliance on requiring many victims of sexual assault or rape to pay for their own forensic examinations; he secured $2.8 million in the state budget to pay for the rape kits. Blunt secured funding which led to the creation of the new Springfield Crime Lab.

Blunt signed an immigration bill prohibiting "sanctuary cities" in Missouri; requiring verification of legal employment status for public employees through E-verify; allowing cancellation of state contracts for contractors that hire illegal immigrants; requiring public agencies to verify the legal status of applicants before providing welfare benefits; criminalizing the transportation of illegal immigrants for exploitative purposes; and enacting provisions to punish employers who willfully hire illegal immigrants.

In 2006, Blunt signed legislation requiring gasoline sold in Missouri to contain 10% ethanol. Blunt has supported the development of biomass, biofuels, wind power and solar energy as alternative energy sources. Air quality continues to be a problem for the state, which has a high rate of air pollution due to burning of coal.

In his 2008 State of the State address, Blunt proposed a one-week state sales tax exemption on Energy Star-certified new appliances. Missouri became the fourth state in the nation to enact such a tax break. Also in 2008, Blunt and Arkansas Democratic governor Mike Beebe signed an historic bi-state water quality agreement to protect watersheds and aquifers that cross state lines.

=== Executive actions ===
Blunt issued Executive Orders and programs to encourage university cooperation, tax relief, research funds and seed capital for "life science" start-up firms, and an innovative program to reward insurance companies and other large institutional investors for investing in funds that hold biotech stocks.

Blunt has promoted Missouri as a potential hotspot for bioscience. He was criticized for limiting science funding for research related to stem cells; this was considered to discourage the science community at large from working in the state. In 2005 Governor Blunt created the Missouri Life Sciences Trust Fund, to accept transfers of monies from the Tobacco Settlement fund and apply them to biotech efforts. In January 2006 Gov. Blunt created the Lewis and Clark Discovery Initiative (LCDI), designed to spread biotechnology across the state. The LCDI was funded initially by the Missouri higher-education learning assistance fund (MOHELA).

=== Alleged misuse of state offices ===
In August 2007, a reporter for the Springfield News-Leader filed to gain access to emails by Ed Martin, Blunt's chief of staff, under the state's Sunshine Law. He was investigating whether Martin had used his office to try to influence anti-abortion groups in relation to opposition to state Attorney General Jay Nixon, a Democrat. Nixon was expected to run against Blunt in the 2008 gubernatorial election. Martin responded on September 4 that he had no such emails, but the reporter later said someone gave him a copy of one, showing that Martin's claim was false.

At the same time, "Blunt spokesman Rich Chrismer insisted to reporters that 'there is no statute or case that requires the state to retain individual's e-mails as a public record.' Blunt himself told reporters that his staffers would not be required to save e-mails for three years," although this was "widely understood to be state law" (known as the Sunshine Law). It was later revealed that Scott Eckersley, a deputy chief counsel, provided copies of language in the state employees' handbook to general counsel Henry Herschel on September 10 about this state requirement to save such materials. Eckersley was soon locked out of his office by order of Martin.

On September 28, 2007, the governor's office fired Eckersley, a political appointee. It distributed packets of emails and documents to four major newspapers in Missouri to support its claims that the attorney had made inappropriate use of a state computer. Eckersley said he was terminated for other reasons, related to trying to ensure employees complied with the state's email retention policy under its Sunshine Law. In the first known "whistleblower" case against the Missouri state government, Eckersley filed suit for wrongful termination and defamation of character against Blunt and his senior appointees.

Due to concerns expressed to his office in November 2007 that there were actions underway to overwrite email tapes and the governor's office was not complying with the Sunshine Law, AG Jay Nixon appointed special investigators on November 15 to study what was taking place. Nixon's team had to go to court in the spring of 2008 to get a ruling on whether the governor's office was required to comply with their requests for information, at the expense of the state. Through various legal maneuverings, the court ruled in favor of the investigation, appointing two Special Attorneys General to lead it. The governor never was deposed. Eventually the completion of the investigation was extended to February 2009 because of the volume of materials that needed to be reviewed. The Kansas City Star, St. Louis Post-Dispatch and Associated Press filed petitions in August 2008 as intervening plaintiffs to gain preliminary and injunctive relief, declaratory judgment that the emails were public records under the state Sunshine Law, and access to the emails under discussion.

Martin resigned in November 2007 as chief of staff, without explanation. Blunt's General Counsel Henry Herschel left soon after. On January 22, 2008, Blunt surprised voters, "staffers and supporters" by announcing he would not run for another term, although he reportedly already had millions of dollars in a war chest for his upcoming campaign. More than a year later and after Blunt had left office, "An investigation by state officials later found that the governor's office failed to properly disclose Mr. Martin's emails." This investigation, which cost the state $2 million, found that Martin had illegally destroyed some emails, in violation of the state's open government or Sunshine Law. It also found he had used his office to influence outside groups against opponents of Blunt.

After a year-long legal effort, in November 2008, the Kansas City Star and St. Louis Post Dispatch reported having gained access to 60,000 pages of Blunt administration emails. Their analysis showed that Ed Martin, former chief of staff to Blunt, had used his state office to try to influence outside political groups, among other internal problems. In addition to trying to encourage opposition to AG Jay Nixon, Martin worked with political groups to oppose the appointment of Patricia Breckenridge to an open seat on the Missouri Supreme Court. (Blunt has supported her and she later gained the seat.) Emails indicate that Leonard Leo was one of the influences corresponding with Martin, as a part of a strategy to dismantle the Missouri Plan.

On May 22, 2009, the Missouri Attorney General's office announced that Eckersley's lawsuit against Blunt and others had been settled for $500,000.

=== Favorability ===
His approval ratings gradually rose during his term in office. A February – March 2008, poll by the Republican polling firm American Viewpoint showed Blunt with an approval rating of 57%. On January 22, 2008, Blunt surprised the GOP when he announced he would not run for re-election. Polls showed that he was running behind the presumptive Democratic nominee, Attorney General Jay Nixon.

== Other activities ==
As Governor, Blunt was a member of the National Governors Association, Southern Governors' Association, and the Republican Governors Association.

As Commander-in-Chief of the Missouri National Guard, Governor Blunt visited Missouri National guard troops serving in Afghanistan, Iraq, Kosovo, Kuwait, and on the Mexican border.

Because he had been called for active duty while serving as secretary of state, Blunt's office responded to questions about what would happen if the governor were called to service. In accordance with Pentagon regulations and the Missouri Constitution, if Blunt was called for military duty while governor, he would have been required to either transfer his gubernatorial powers to Lieutenant Governor Peter Kinder, or resign from the Naval Reserve.

== Career after governorship ==
Prior to his appointment as president of the American Automotive Policy Council in 2011, Blunt served as a member of the board of Copart, an auto salvage company in Fairfield, California; an advisor for Solamere Capital, a suburban Boston private equity firm started by Tagg Romney; a consultant for Cassidy & Associates, a Washington, D.C., lobbying firm, and a partner with The Ashcroft Group, the Washington, D.C., and St. Louis-based consulting firm founded by former U.S. Attorney General John Ashcroft. Blunt has continued to advocate for greater transparency in government spending, state and national lawsuit reform and improving public education.

Blunt has been critical of cuts to education funding, arguing that they will erode Missouri's future. He wrote, "States will either be welfare states that protect welfare programs, or they will be education states that prepare for the future." He has also questioned the proposal to cut state scholarship funding for private colleges, writing in an op-ed, "I have been surprised to see those private schools and their students become a scapegoat as the state cuts education funding and scholarships."

=== President of the American Automotive Policy Council ===
In February 2011, Matt Blunt was selected as president of the American Automotive Policy Council (AAPC). The AAPC is a trade association created by General Motors, Ford and Chrysler. The council is based in Washington, D.C., and its mission is to promote the public image and lobby for the interests of these "Big Three" American automobile companies. Blunt's governorship of one of the United States' top automobile and automobile-component producing states was given as a major reason for him being chosen to lead the council.

Party political offices
Preceded by John Hancock	Republican nominee for Secretary of State of Missouri; 2000	Succeeded by Catherine Hanaway
Preceded by Jim Talent	Republican nominee for Governor of Missouri; 2004	Succeeded by Kenny Hulshof
Political offices
Preceded by Bekki Cook	Secretary of State of Missouri; 2001–2005	Succeeded by Robin Carnahan
Preceded by Bob Holden	Governor of Missouri; 2005–2009	Succeeded by Jay Nixon
U.S. order of precedence (ceremonial)
Preceded by Bob Holden as Former Governor	Order of precedence of the United States	Succeeded by Jay Nixon as Former Governor
