= Rely on Your Beliefs Fund =

The Rely on Your Beliefs Fund (ROYB Fund) is an American Political Action Committee associated with Rep. Roy Blunt. Since its inception, the fund has collected and spent more than $1.8 million.

On May 23, 2002, the ROYB Fund was forced to enter into a consent decree with the Missouri Ethics Commission for failing to comply with Missouri law by not filing a statement of organization and required reports in a timely fashion.

== People ==
- Roy Blunt – honorary chairman.
- Jim Ellis – founding staffer

== Notable contributors ==
- AbbVie
- Altria (one of the top corporate contributors in 2001-02 according to ; Blunt's current wife was previously a lobbyist for the company)
- American Airlines
- American Beverage Association
- American Crystal Sugar Company
- American Dental Association
- Amgen
- Anheuser-Busch
- Anthem Insurance
- AT&T
- Enron
- Facebook
- Koch Industries
- Merck
- Microsoft PAC
- National Association of Broadcasters
- Pfizer
- Travellers
- Time-Warner
- T-Mobile
- Waste Management
- Walmart
- In March 2002, the Tigua tribe began making political contributions on request of Jack Abramoff in hopes of getting a casino approved.

== Payees ==
- J.W. Ellis Co. (roughly $88,000 in consulting fees)
