= Paul Busiek =

American politician

Member of the Missouri House of Representatives from the 145th district
- In office 1976–1978
- Preceded by: Margaret (Peg) Miller
- Succeeded by: Leroy Blunt

Personal details
- Born: Paul Joseph Busiek; April 1, 1923 Springfield, Missouri, U.S.
- Died: April 18, 2016 (aged 93) Springfield, Missouri, U.S.
- Party: Republican
- Spouses: Cynthia Stephenson; Mavis Troxel
- Children: 4
- Education: Drury College (BS); Washington University (MD)
- Occupation: Pediatrician; politician

Military service
- Branch/service: United States Army; Army Air Forces
- Battles/wars: World War II
- Awards: Good Conduct Medal

Paul Joseph Busiek (/ˈbjuːsɪk/, April 1, 1923 – April 18, 2016) was an American doctor and politician who served in the Missouri House of Representatives. Busiek attended Drury College and Washington University in St. Louis, earning his medical degree at the latter. He did an internship in Rochester, New York and at a children's hospital in St. Louis before opening up a private practice in Springfield, Missouri. Busiek was elected to the Missouri House of Representatives in 1976 and served one term, retiring in 1978.
