= Leroy Blunt =

American politician (1921–2016)

Member of the Missouri House of Representatives
- In office January 3, 1979 – January 3, 1987
- Preceded by: Paul Busiek
- Succeeded by: Tommy MacDonnell
- Constituency: 145th district (1979–1983); 140th district (1983–1987)

Personal details
- Born: Herschel Leroy Blunt; December 3, 1921 Webster Co., Missouri, U.S.
- Died: March 21, 2016 (aged 94) Marshfield, Missouri, U.S.
- Party: Republican
- Spouses: Neva Letterman (m. 1942; died 1993); Dora Blankenship Hyde (m. 1995)
- Children: 2, including Roy
- Education: University of Missouri
- Occupation: Farmer; politician

Herschel Leroy Blunt (December 3, 1921 – March 21, 2016) was an American farmer and politician who served in the Missouri House of Representatives. He was also the father of U.S. Senator from Missouri and former U.S. Representative Roy Blunt. Roy's son, Matt Blunt, is a former Governor of Missouri.

Blunt was born near Marshfield, Missouri, in Webster County, the son of Bessie J. (Muncy) and Benjamin Lee Blunt. He attended public schools in Conway, Missouri, and the University of Missouri. In 1942, he married Neva Letterman, and he lived on a farm near Marshfield, Missouri. He first won election to the state house in 1978 as a Republican, succeeding Paul Busiek as representative for the 145th district. His opponent in the race was Betty Anne McCaskill, mother of future Senator Claire McCaskill, who would later unsuccessfully run against Matt Blunt in the 2004 gubernatorial election, and serve with Roy in Senate from 2011 to 2019. He was reelected in 1980, and, after redistricting, he was elected to two more terms, representing the new 140th district. He retired in 1987 and was succeeded by Democrat Tommy MacDonnell. After Neva died in 1993, Blunt married Dora Blankenship Hyde in 1995. He died on March 21, 2016, at Marshfield Care Center in Marshfield, Missouri.

Missouri House of Representatives
Preceded by Paul Busiek	Member of the Missouri House of Representatives from the 145th district 1979–1983	Succeeded by R. B. Grisham
Preceded by Eddie G. Williams	Member of the Missouri House of Representatives from the 140th district 1983–1987	Succeeded by Tommy MacDonnell
