= Roy Blunt =

American politician (born 1950)

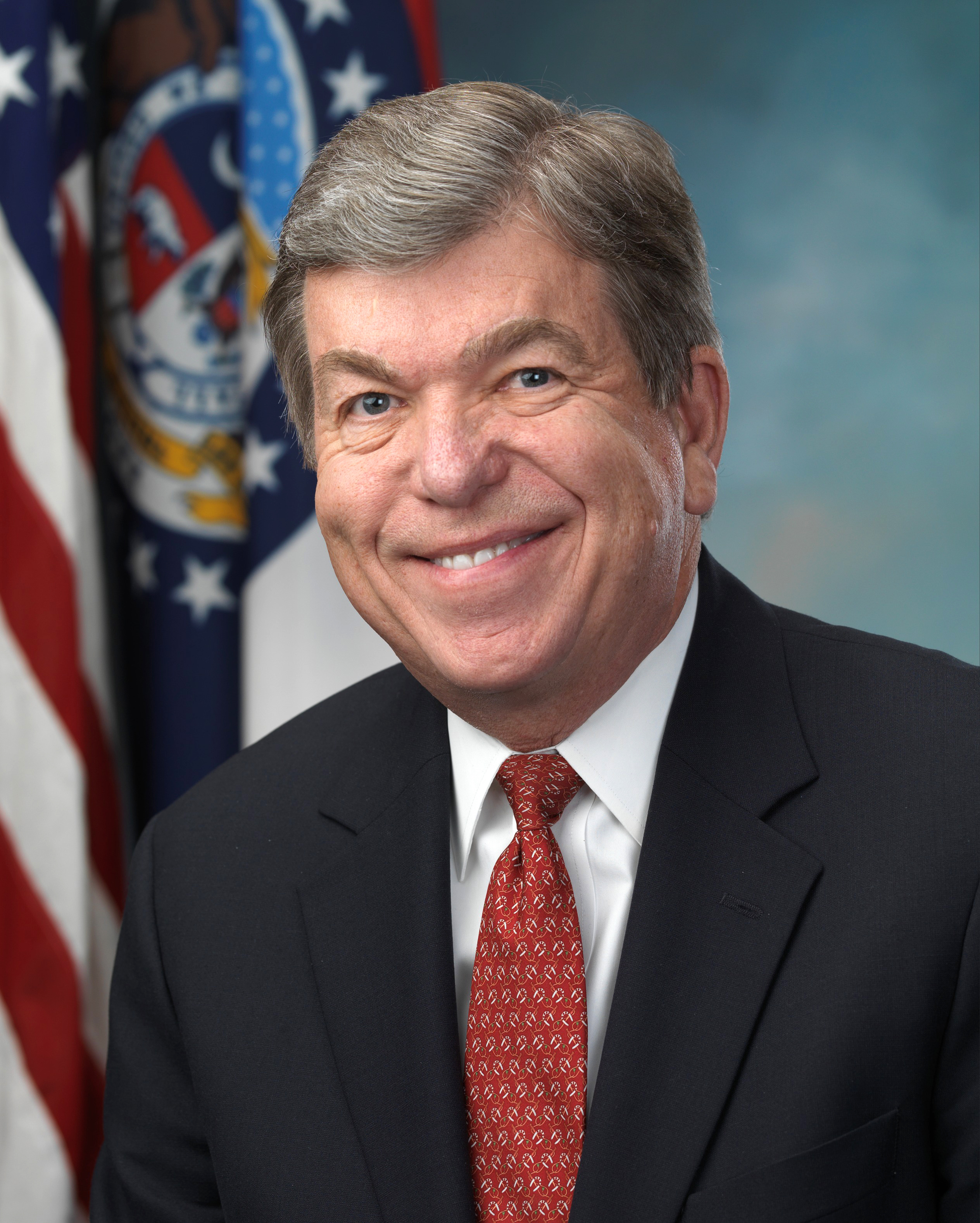
- Official portrait, 2011

United States Senator from Missouri
- In office January 3, 2011 – January 3, 2023
- Preceded by: Kit Bond
- Succeeded by: Eric Schmitt
Senate positions
Chair of the Senate Republican Policy Committee
In office January 3, 2019 – January 3, 2023
Leader	Mitch McConnell
Preceded by	John Barrasso
Succeeded by	Joni Ernst
Ranking Member of the Senate Rules Committee
In office February 3, 2021 – January 3, 2023
Preceded by	Amy Klobuchar
Succeeded by	Deb Fischer
Chair of the Senate Rules Committee
In office April 10, 2018 – February 3, 2021
Preceded by	Richard Shelby
Succeeded by	Amy Klobuchar
In office January 3, 2015 – January 3, 2017
Preceded by	Chuck Schumer
Succeeded by	Richard Shelby

Member of the U.S. House of Representatives from Missouri's 7th district
- In office January 3, 1997 – January 3, 2011
- Preceded by: Mel Hancock
- Succeeded by: Billy Long
House positions
House Minority Whip
In office January 3, 2007 – January 3, 2009
Leader	John Boehner
Preceded by	Steny Hoyer
Succeeded by	Eric Cantor
Acting House Majority Leader
In office September 29, 2005 – February 2, 2006
Speaker	Dennis Hastert
Preceded by	Tom DeLay
Succeeded by	John Boehner
House Majority Whip
In office January 3, 2003 – January 3, 2007
Leader	Dennis Hastert
Preceded by	Tom DeLay
Succeeded by	Jim Clyburn
House Republican Chief Deputy Whip
In office January 3, 1999 – January 3, 2003
Leader	Dennis Hastert
Preceded by	Dennis Hastert
Succeeded by	Eric Cantor

23rd President of Southwest Baptist University
- In office December 30, 1992 – October 21, 1996
- Preceded by: Wayne Gott (acting)
- Succeeded by: C. Pat Taylor

33rd Secretary of State of Missouri
- In office January 14, 1985 – January 11, 1993
- Governor: John Ashcroft
- Preceded by: James Kirkpatrick
- Succeeded by: Judi Moriarty

Personal details
- Born: Roy Dean Blunt; January 10, 1950 (age 76) Niangua, Missouri, U.S.
- Party: Republican
- Spouses: Roseann Ray (m. 1967; div. 2003); Abigail Perlman (m. 2003)
- Children: 4, including Matt and Andrew
- Parent: Leroy Blunt (father)
- Education: Southwest Baptist University (BA); Missouri State University (MA)
- Blunt's voice Blunt on the Budget Control Act of 2011 in relation to the FY2020 Department of Education budget request. Recorded March 29, 2019

Roy Dean Blunt (born January 10, 1950) is an American politician and lobbyist who served as a United States senator from Missouri from 2011 to 2023. A member of the Republican Party, he previously served as the 33rd Missouri Secretary of State (1985–1993) and U.S. Representative for Missouri's 7th congressional district (1997–2011).

Born in Niangua, Missouri, Blunt is a graduate of Southwest Baptist University and Southwest Missouri State University (now Missouri State University). After serving as Missouri Secretary of State from 1985 to 1993, he was elected to the U.S. House of Representatives for Missouri's 7th congressional district in 1996. There, he served as Republican Whip from 2003 to 2009.

Blunt successfully ran for the U.S. Senate in 2010. The next year, he was elected vice chairman of the Senate Republican Conference. Blunt, who was the dean of Missouri's congressional delegation, was elected to serve as Policy Committee chairman in November 2018. On March 8, 2021, he announced that he would not seek reelection in 2022. He was succeeded in the U.S. Senate by Missouri Attorney General Eric Schmitt.

After leaving Congress, Blunt began working for the lobbying firm Husch Blackwell Strategies. He also joined as a member of Southwest Airlines' board of directors.

== Early life ==
Blunt was born on January 10, 1950, in Niangua, Missouri, the son of Neva Dora (née Letterman) and Leroy Blunt, a politician. He earned a B.A. degree in history in 1970 from Southwest Baptist University.

== Education ==
Two years later, he earned a master's degree in history from Southwest Missouri State University. During his time in college, he received three draft deferments from the Vietnam War. Blunt was a high school history teacher at Marshfield High School in the city of Marshfield from 1970 to 1972; he later taught at Southwest Baptist University and as a member of the adjunct faculty at Drury University.

He went on to serve as president of Southwest Baptist University, his alma mater, from 1993 to 1996.

== Early political career (1972–1997) ==
=== Greene county clerk ===
Blunt entered politics in 1973, when he was appointed county clerk and chief election official of Greene County, Missouri. He was subsequently elected to the position three times and served a total of 12 years.

=== 1980 lieutenant gubernatorial election ===
In 1980 incumbent Republican Lieutenant Governor Bill Phelps ran for governor. Blunt, the Greene County Clerk, decided to run for the open seat and won the Republican primary, but lost the general election to State Representative Ken Rothman 56%–44%.

=== Secretary of State ===
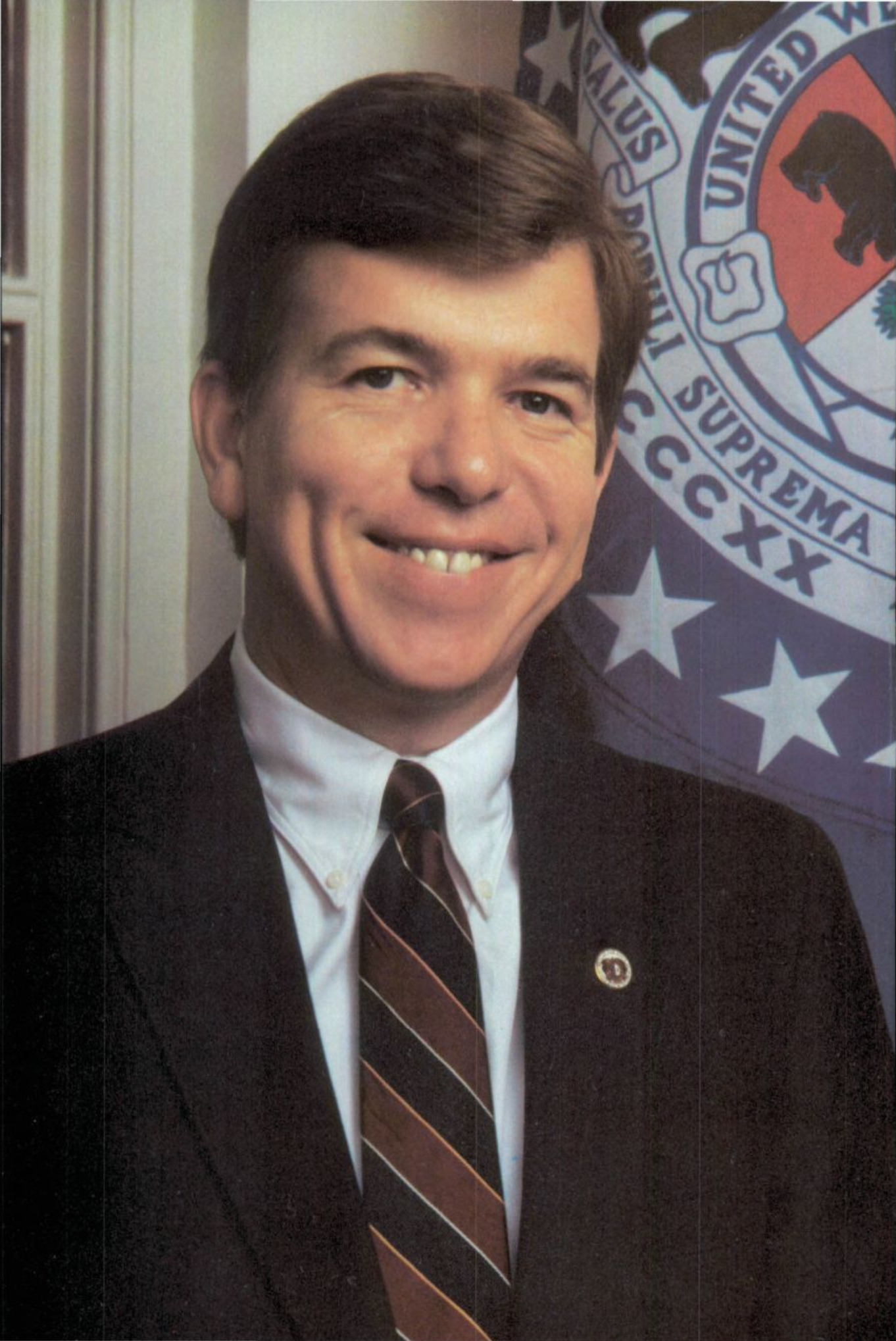
Roy Blunt as Missouri Secretary of State in 1990

In 1984, after incumbent Democratic Missouri Secretary of State James Kirkpatrick decided to retire, Blunt ran for the position and won the Republican primary with 79% of the vote. In the general election, he defeated Democratic State Representative Gary D. Sharpe 54%–46%. He became the first Republican to hold the post in 50 years.

In 1988, he won reelection against Democrat James Askew 61%–38%.

=== 1992 gubernatorial election ===
Since incumbent Republican Governor John Ashcroft was term-limited, Blunt ran for the governorship in 1992. Missouri Attorney General William Webster won the Republican primary, defeating Blunt and Missouri Treasurer Wendell Bailey 44%–40%–15%. Webster lost the general election to Mel Carnahan.

== U.S. House of Representatives (1997–2011) ==
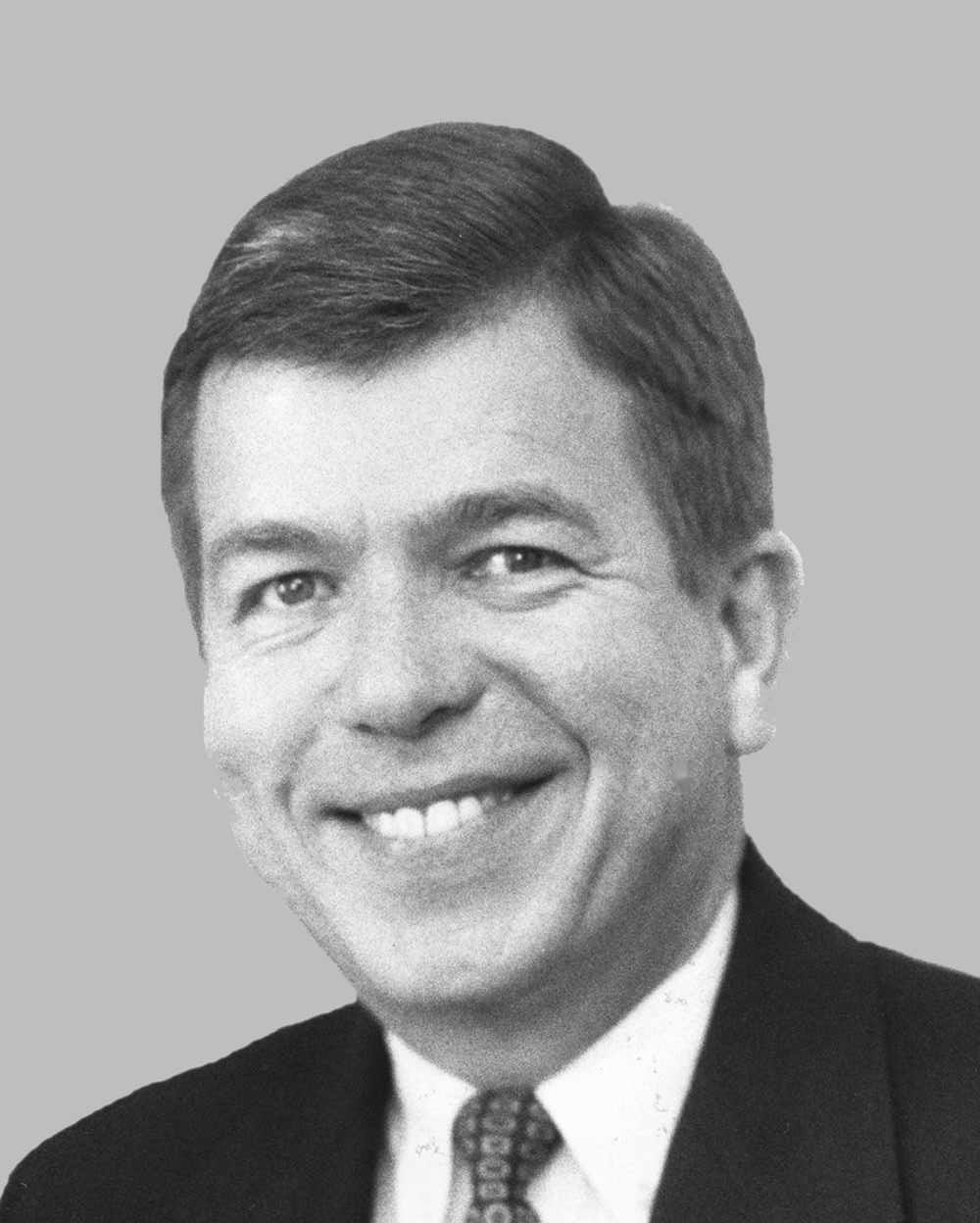
Blunt in his first term in the U.S. House of Representatives

=== Elections ===
In 1996 Blunt decided to run for the United States House of Representatives after incumbent U.S. Representative Mel Hancock honored his pledge to serve only four terms. Blunt ran in Missouri's 7th congressional district, the state's most conservative district, in the Ozark Mountains in the southwest. Blunt's political action committee is the Rely on Your Beliefs Fund.

On August 6, 1996, he won the Republican primary, defeating Gary Nodler 56%–44%. In the general election, he defeated Democrat Ruth Bamberger 65%–32%.

=== Tenure ===
==== Education ====
Blunt voted in favor of school prayer and supported the No Child Left Behind Act. He voted in favor of school vouchers within the District of Columbia but against broader legislation allowing states to use federal money to issue vouchers for private or religious schools. He received a 17% rating from the National Education Association in 2003.

==== Fiscal issues ====
Blunt received a 97% rating from the United States Chamber of Commerce. He supported efforts to overhaul U.S. bankruptcy laws, requiring consumers who seek bankruptcy protection to repay more of their debts.

Blunt opposes federal cap and trade legislation and supports drilling for oil on the U.S. coastline. He does not believe in man-made global warming, stating: "There isn't any real science to say we are altering the climate or path of the Earth."

==== Gun policy ====
Blunt voted to prohibit lawsuits against gun manufacturers and dealers if the guns they manufacture or sell are later used in a crime. He has also voted to require anyone who purchases a gun at a gun show to go through a background check that must be completed within 24 hours. He has received an "A" rating from the NRA Political Victory Fund (NRA-PVF).

==== Health policy ====
Blunt chaired the House Republican Health Care Solutions Group.

In 2006, Blunt successfully advocated for legislation that placed restrictions on over-the-counter cold medicines that could be used in the production of methamphetamines. The legislation, called the Combat Meth Act, was opposed by retail and drug lobbyists.

In August 2009, Blunt stated in two separate newspaper interviews that, because he was 59 years old, "In either Canada or Great Britain, if I broke my hip, I couldn't get it replaced." He stated he had heard the statement in Congressional testimony by "some people who are supposed to be experts on Canadian health care." The PolitiFact service of the St. Petersburg Times reported that it could not find any such testimony.

==== Minimum wage ====
Blunt voted against HR 2007-018, which raised the federal minimum wage to $7.25 per hour.

==== Social issues ====
He has voted to ban partial-birth abortions and to restrict or criminalize transporting minors across state lines for the purpose of getting an abortion. He opposes federal funding for elective abortions in accordance with the Hyde Amendment.

He voted in favor of the unsuccessful Federal Marriage Amendment which sought to place a national ban on same-sex marriage, and has voted against gay adoption. He received 94% lifetime and 96% 2004 ratings from the conservative American Conservative Union, a 14% rating from the ACLU, and a 92% rating from the conservative Christian Coalition.

==== Social Security and Medicare ====
In 2005, Blunt supported President George W. Bush's proposal to partially privatize Social Security for those under the age of 55.

=== Leadership ===
After only one term, Blunt was appointed Chief Deputy Whip, the highest appointed position in the House Republican Caucus. In that capacity, he served as the Republicans' chief vote-counter. In 2002, when Dick Armey retired and fellow Texan Tom DeLay was elected to succeed him, Blunt was elected to succeed DeLay as House Majority Whip.

Blunt served as Majority Leader on an acting basis starting in September 2005, after DeLay was indicted on felony charges involving campaign finance. On January 8, 2006, one day after DeLay announced that he would not seek to regain his position, Blunt announced he would run to permanently replace DeLay.

On January 14, 2006, Blunt issued a release claiming that the majority of the Republican caucus had endorsed him as DeLay's successor. But when the election was held by secret ballot on February 2, 2006, U.S. Representative John Boehner of Ohio won on the second ballot, with 122 votes to 109 for Blunt. In November 2006, House Republicans elected Blunt to their second-highest position during the 110th Congress, Minority Whip. Blunt handily defeated U.S. Representative John Shadegg of Arizona for the position. He announced he would step down from the position in late 2008, following two successive election cycles where House Republicans had lost seats, avoiding a difficult battle with his deputy, Eric Cantor, who was urged by some to challenge Blunt for the position.

=== Committee assignments ===
Upon entering the U.S. House, Blunt served on the House International Relations Committee, the House Committee on Agriculture, and the House Transportation Committee. In 1999, he gave up seats on the latter two committees and joined the Committee on Energy and Commerce. In addition he became a member of the Permanent Select Committee on Intelligence.

== U.S. Senate (2011–2023) ==
=== 2010 election ===
On February 19, 2009, Blunt announced he would seek the Republican nomination for the U.S. Senate election for the seat being vacated by incumbent Republican U.S. Senator Kit Bond. He successfully ran against Democratic nominee Secretary of State Robin Carnahan, Constitution Party nominee Jerry Beck, Libertarian nominee Jonathan Dine, and write-in candidates Mark S. Memoly, Frazier Miller, Jeff Wirick and Richie L. Wolfe.

=== Tenure ===
According to the St. Louis Post-Dispatch, Blunt "has one of the Senate's most conservative voting records, yet he generally avoids the confrontational, firebrand style" and during his tenure in the U.S. Senate "Blunt's most significant legislative accomplishments all had Democrat co-sponsors." The Lugar Center and Georgetown's McCourt School of Public Policy's Bipartisan Index ranked Blunt the 11th most bipartisan senator in the first session of the 115th United States Congress.

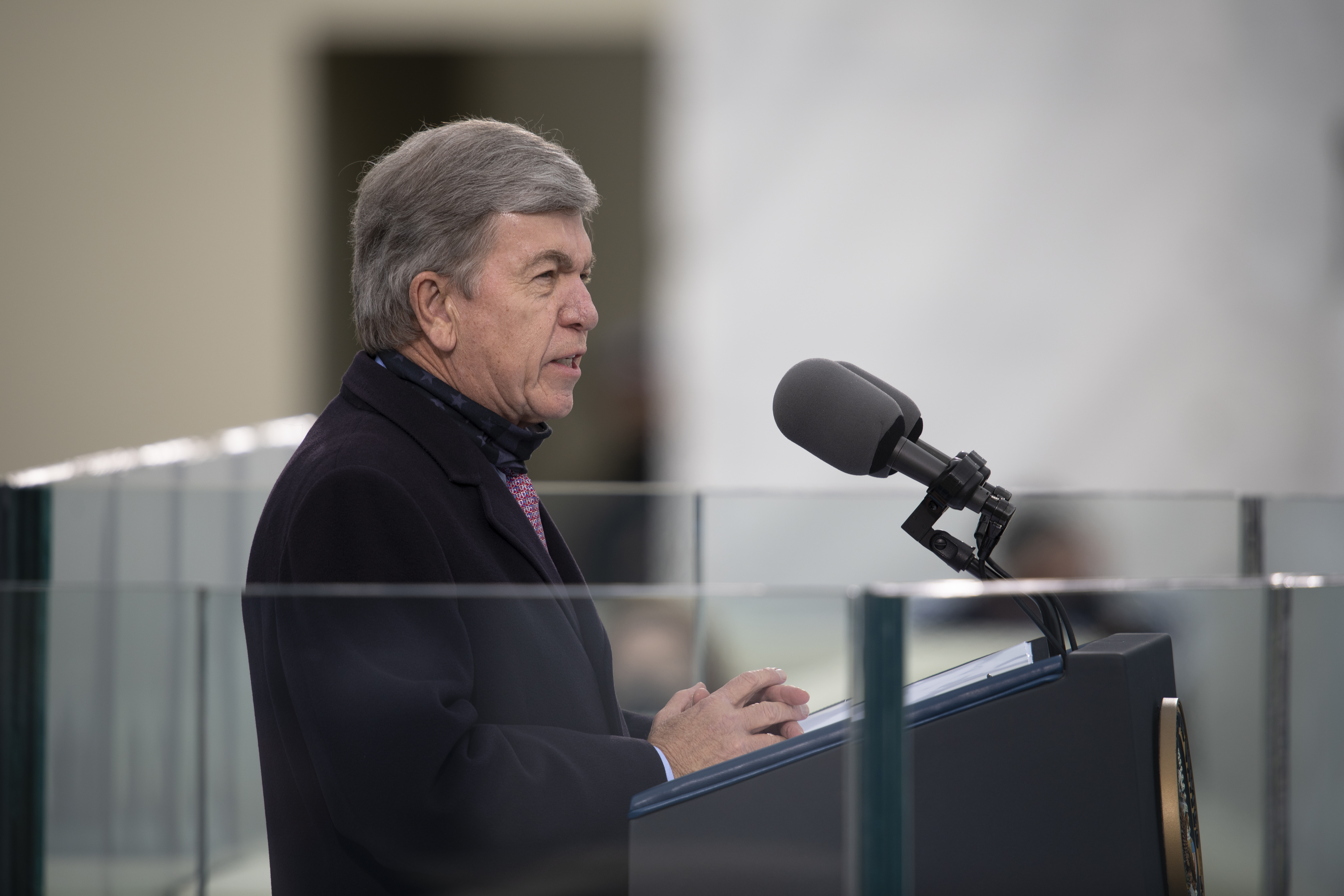
Blunt speaking at the inauguration of Joe Biden

Blunt was at the U.S. Capitol when Trump supporters attacked it on January 6, 2021, serving as a teller for the 2021 United States Electoral College vote count certification, alongside Senator Amy Klobuchar, Representative Rodney Davis, and Representative Zoe Lofgren. Before the certification, Blunt said he would support the certification of the election, in contrast to his fellow Missouri senator Josh Hawley. While Blunt observed the deliberations over the objection to counting Arizona's votes, led by Ted Cruz, the Capitol was breached. Along with other senators, Blunt was removed from the Senate floor to an undisclosed location as the insurrectionists moved closer to the Senate chambers. He tweeted during the attack that the "violence and destruction" needed to stop and that "This is not who we are as a nation." Blunt stated that Trump "was a part of it", referring to the insurrection.

In the wake of the attack, Blunt said he would not support impeaching Trump and that there was "no time" to do so. He also called it a "disappointment" that Democrats were considering impeachment. In an interview with Face the Nation, Blunt said, "the president touched the hot stove on Wednesday and is unlikely to touch it again."

As master of ceremonies for the inauguration of Joe Biden as president, Blunt delivered a short speech expounding the Constitution's Preamble, noting that unlike the Articles of Confederation or the Magna Carta, it roots and establishes law and authority in "We the People". Blunt remarked that the endeavor to create a "more perfect Union" is a continuing project and said, "we are more than we have been and we are less than we hope to be".

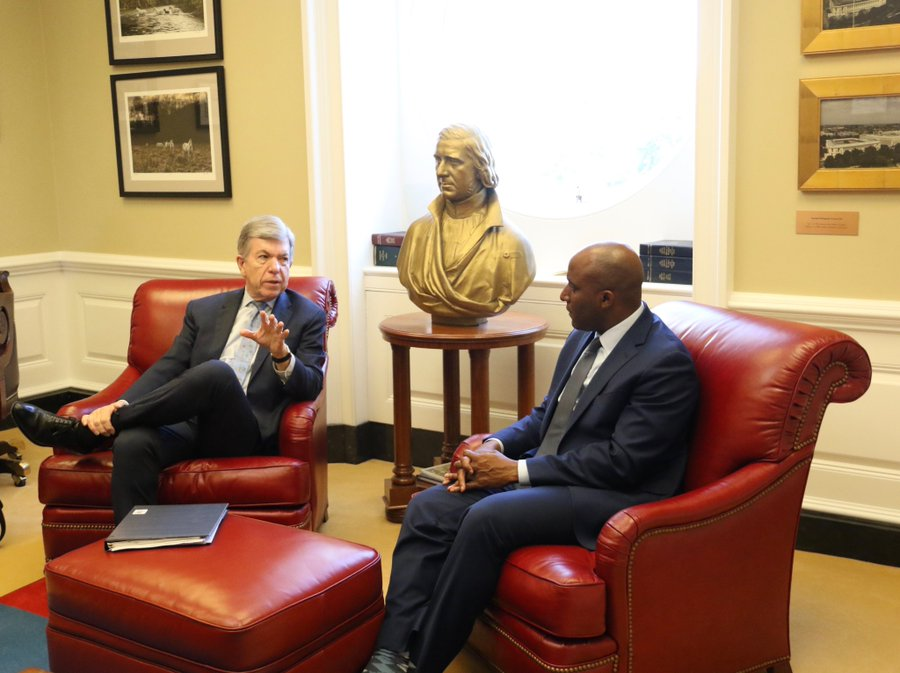
Blunt with Kansas City Mayor Quinton Lucas in October 2021

Senate assignments

During the 117th Congress, Blunt's committee and subcommittee appointments are as follows.

- Committee on Appropriations
  - Subcommittee on Agriculture, Rural Development, Food and Drug Administration, and Related Agencies
  - Subcommittee on Department of Defense
  - Subcommittee on Department of the Interior, Environment, and Related Agencies
  - Subcommittee on Departments of Labor, Health and Human Services, and Education, and Related Agencies (Ranking Member)
  - Subcommittee on State, Foreign Operations, and Related Programs
  - Subcommittee on Transportation, Housing and Urban Development, and Related Agencies
- Committee on Commerce, Science, and Transportation
  - Subcommittee on Aviation and Space
  - Subcommittee on Communications, Technology, Innovation, and the Internet
  - Subcommittee on Security
  - Subcommittee on Transportation and Safety
- Committee on Rules and Administration (Ranking Member)
- Joint Committee on Printing (Vice Ranking Member)
- Joint Committee on the Library (Vice Ranking Member)
- Select Committee on Intelligence

=== Political positions ===
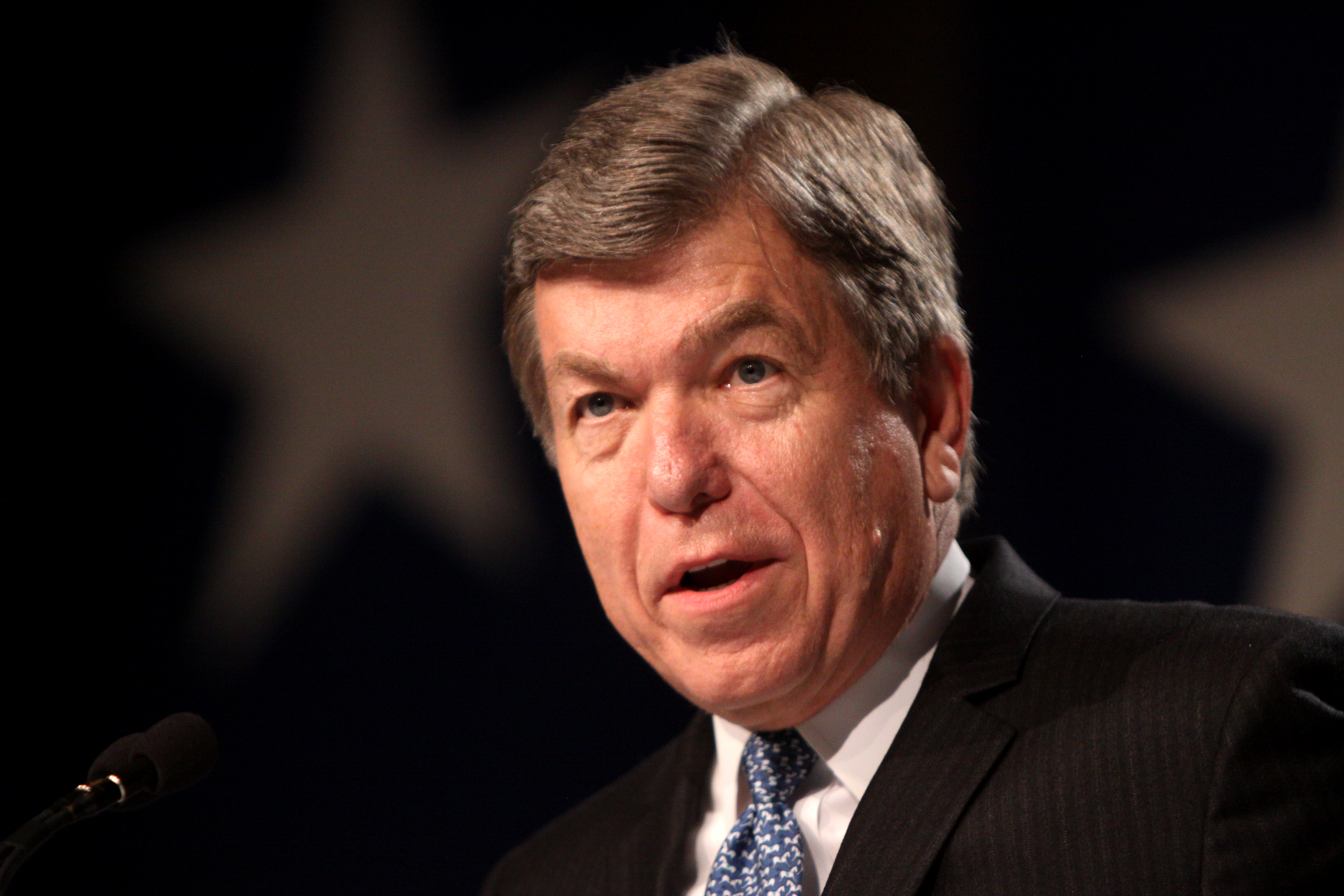
Blunt at the 2011 Values Voter Summit

==== Agriculture ====
In 2013, Blunt worked with Monsanto to author a rider called the Farmer Assurance Provision, which was added into the Consolidated and Further Continuing Appropriations Act, 2013. The rider's language originated in an agriculture spending bill in the U.S. House.

Since 2014, Blunt has been the largest recipient of campaign contributions from Monsanto, which is headquartered in Missouri.

According to progressive news magazine The Nation, the rider "curtailed already weak oversight over the handful of agro-giants that control the GMO market by allowing crops that a judge ruled were not properly approved to continue to be planted." According to Blunt, who did not add the rider to the bill but who supported it, "What it says is if you plant a crop that is legal to plant when you plant it, you get to harvest it". He later led Senate Republicans in defeating an amendment by Democratic Senator Jeff Merkley to repeal the provision. Blunt claimed all the amendment did "was repeat [sic] authority that the secretary in a hearing the other day, before the Agri[culture] Approp[riations] committee the other day, said he already had. And it didn't require the secretary to do anything that the secretary thought was the wrong thing to do. Which is one of the reasons I thought it was fine".

==== Donald Trump ====
In 2020, Blunt voted to acquit Trump in his first impeachment trial.

In 2021, Blunt was one of 43 senators who voted to acquit Trump in his second impeachment trial.

In 2022, after the FBI search of Mar-a-Lago, Blunt said that Trump "should have turned over all the documents" to the National Archives when he left office. Blunt also expressed concern over the timing of the search, citing the upcoming midterm elections.

==== Economic policy ====
Blunt has been opposed to raising the federal minimum wage.

On June 20, 2013, Blunt co-sponsored the Death Tax Repeal Act of 2013. The bill was intended to permanently eliminate federal estate tax and it did not pass.

On January 17, 2014, Blunt introduced a bill called the Partnership to Build America Act. If signed into law, the bill would create a special fund to pay for infrastructure projects across the United States, according to Ripon Advance.

==== Energy and environment ====
Blunt rejects the scientific consensus on climate change. In 2015, he voted against a nonbinding Senate resolution stating that "climate change is real and caused by human activity and that Congress needs to take action to cut carbon pollution." According to The Guardian, Blunt has acknowledged that climate change exists, but said that the human role in it is "unclear".

According to The Springfield News-Leader, "Blunt has railed against the Obama administration's proposed rules to combat global warming, which could deal a blow to Missouri's coal-fired power plants." In 2015, Blunt sponsored an unsuccessful amendment which "called on the Senate to nullify a climate change agreement in November between the United States and China in which both nations pledged to reduce their carbon emissions."

Blunt has worked to protect the coal industry and co-sponsored an amendment to urge President Obama to consult with the Senate before ratifying the Paris climate agreements. In 2017, he was one of 22 senators to sign a letter to Trump urging him to withdraw the United States from the Paris Agreement. According to OpenSecrets, Blunt has received over $400,000 from the oil and gas industry since 2012.

In 2016, Blunt worked to block a carbon tax on emissions. He supports the expanded domestic exploration for coal and natural gas. Citing his support for agriculture and energy production, Blunt "has aggressively pushed to block a rule that would allow the Environmental Protection Agency to regulate some streams, wetlands and other waters."

==== Foreign policy ====
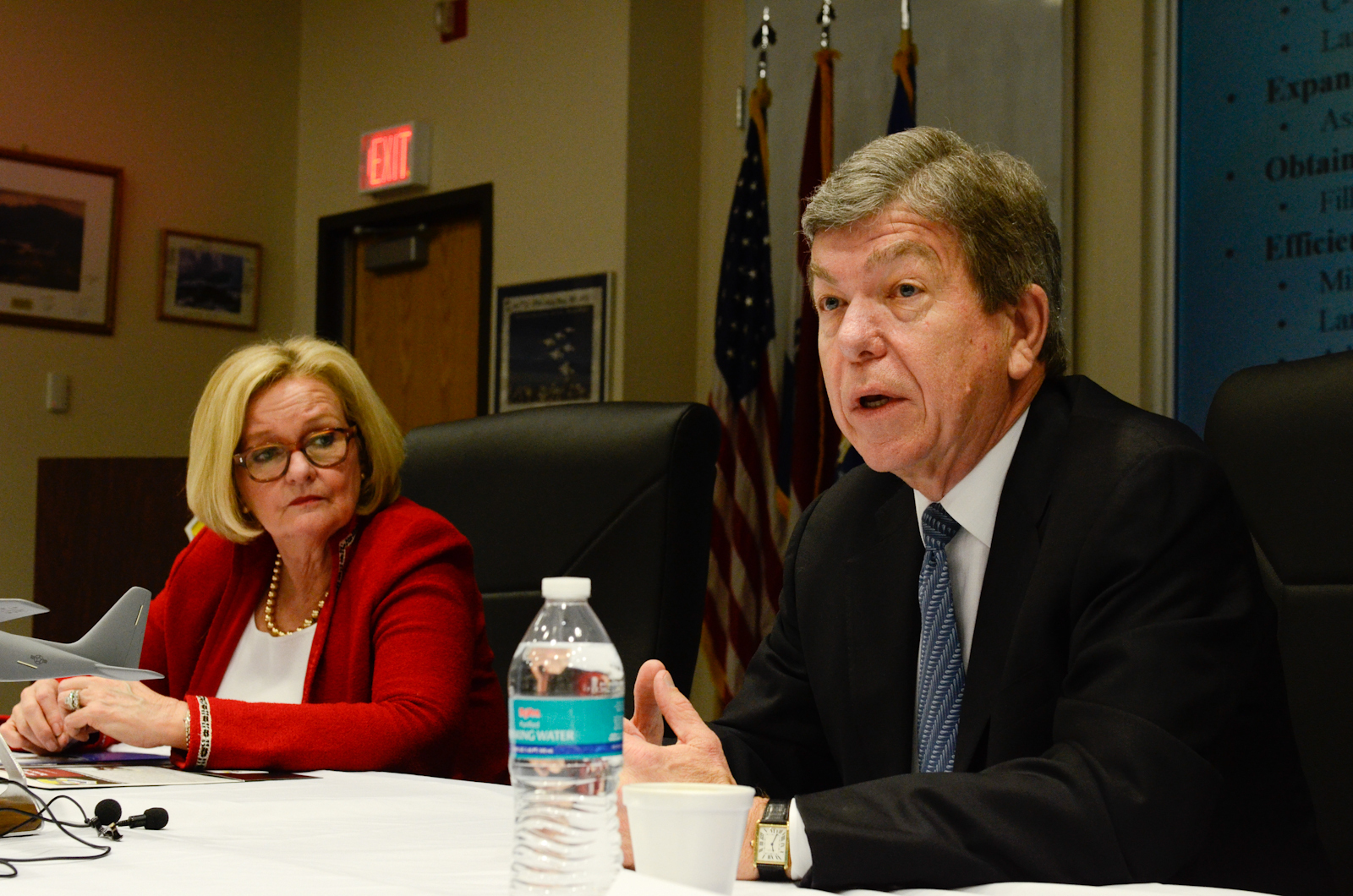
Blunt and Senator Claire McCaskill speaking at Rosecrans Air National Guard Base in March 2014

In 2011, Blunt called for a no fly zone over Libya.

In 2018, Blunt rejected the CIA's "high confidence" assessment that Saudi prince Mohammed bin-Salman ordered the killing of Jamal Khashoggi, a prominent critic of the Saudi regime. Blunt said, "we don't quite have all the information we'd like to have yet."

In January 2020, Blunt supported the Trump administration ordering the killing of Qasem Soleimani.

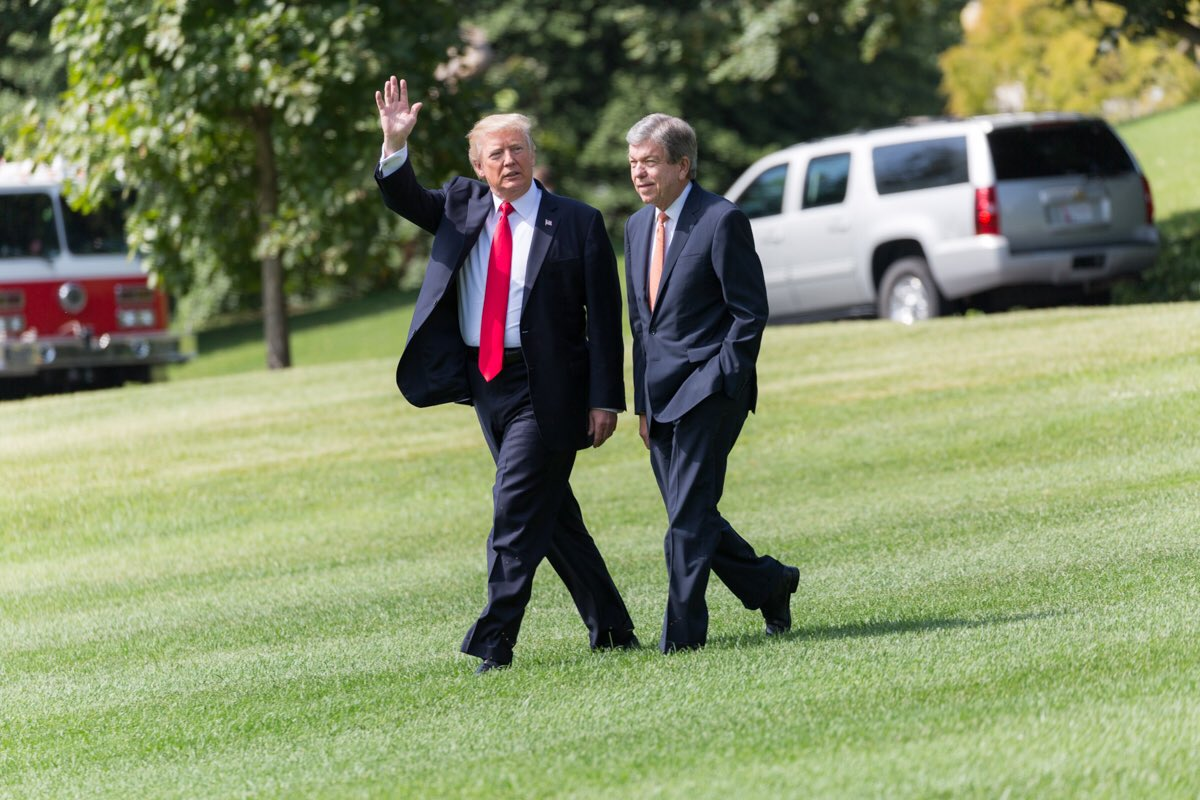
Blunt with President Donald Trump in August 2017

In 2021, Blunt criticized the U.S. withdrawal from Afghanistan, arguing that there was a failure to evacuate U.S. citizens and their family members.

==== Gun policy ====
Blunt has an "A" rating from the NRA Political Victory Fund (NRA-PVF) and has been endorsed in multiple elections.

In April 2013, Blunt was one of forty-six senators to vote against the passing of a bill which would have expanded background checks for all gun buyers. Blunt voted with 40 Republicans and 5 Democrats to stop the bill, which failed to pass.

One month after the 2016 Orlando nightclub shooting, Blunt voted for two Republican-sponsored bills. The first was proposed by John Cornyn and would have enabled a 72-hour waiting period for federal authorities to investigate individuals seeking to buy guns who are listed on the terrorist watch list. The second bill, proposed by Chuck Grassley, would have expanded background checks and made it illegal for individuals with certain mental health disorders to purchase guns. Neither bill passed. Blunt voted against two Democrat-sponsored bills, both which also did not pass, including one that would have made background checks required for online gun sales and gun sales at gun shows and another that would have not allowed anyone on the terrorist watchlist to purchase a gun.

In response to the 2017 Las Vegas shooting, Blunt said he was "saddened by the tragic loss of life" and offered his thoughts to the victims.

In 2022, Blunt later became one of ten Republican Senators to support a bipartisan agreement on gun control, which involved a red flag provision, a support for state crisis intervention orders, funding for school safety resources, stronger background checks for buyers under the age of 21, and penalties for straw purchases. As a result of Blunt supporting the Safer Communities Act hunter safety and school archery programs have come under attack by the Department of Education.

==== Health policy ====
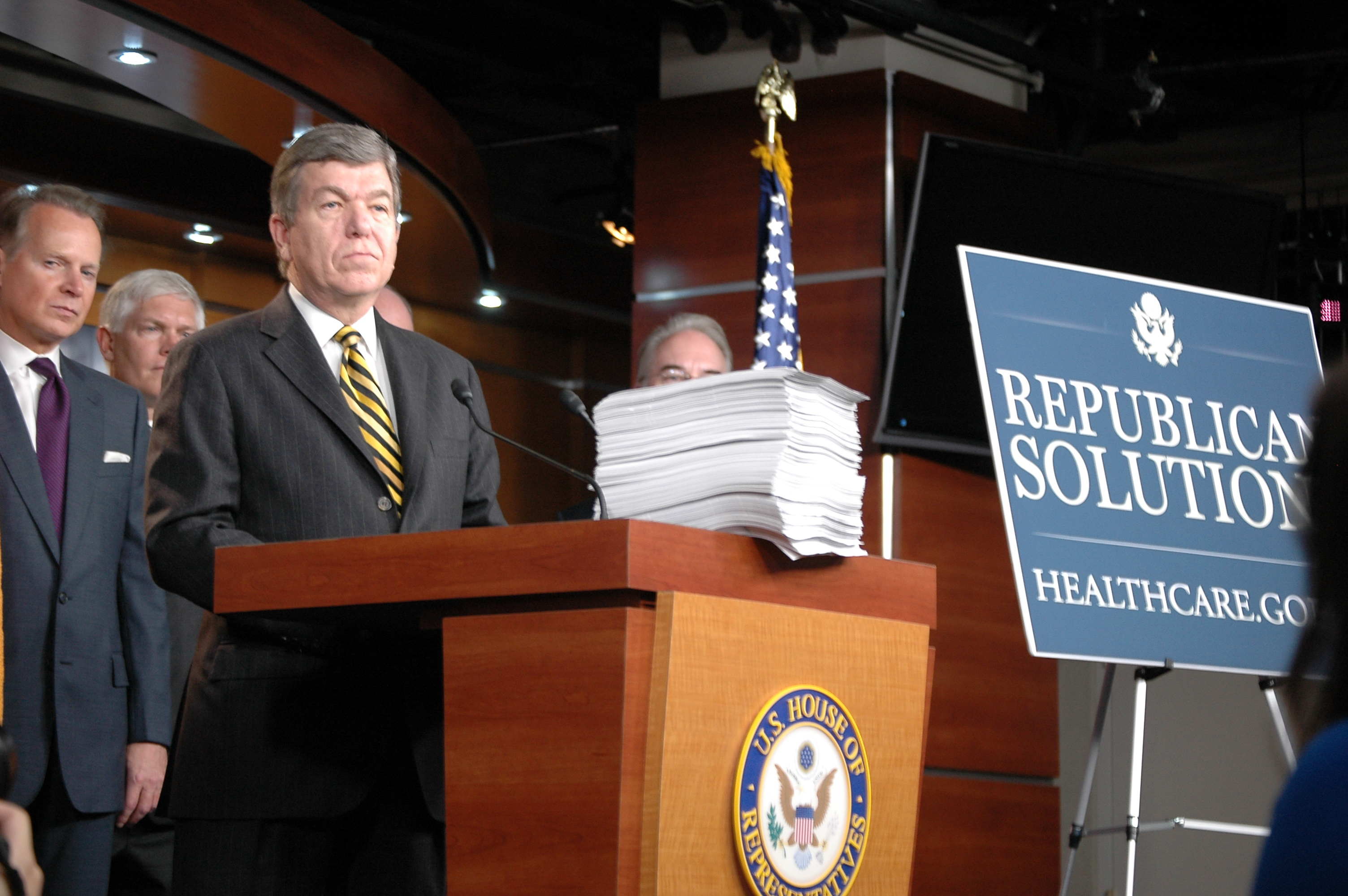
Blunt speaking at a Republican press conference on health care in October 2009

The Wall Street Journal reported in February 2012 that "Blunt introduced an amendment to the Patient Protection and Affordable Care Act that would allow an employer to deny health services if they conflict with their 'religious beliefs or moral convictions'."

Blunt said of the amendment, "[W]as it an overreach when Mrs. Clinton put it in the Clinton health care plan in 1994? I don't think it's an overreach at all. It doesn't mention any specific procedure. It doesn't even suggest the mandate should be eliminated."

In 2012, Blunt attempted to add an amendment to a highway funding bill that would allow employers to refuse to provide health insurance for birth control and contraceptives. In a press release, Blunt defended the amendment on the grounds that it protected the First Amendment rights of religious employers; the amendment failed, with 51 senators voting against it.

In July 2013, Blunt indicated that he would not support efforts to tie raising the federal debt ceiling to defunding Obamacare. In an interview on MSNBC, he expressed his opinion that Obamacare is "destined to fail", but that raising the debt ceiling should not be "held hostage" to "any specific thing".

In 2016, Senators Blunt and Patty Murray (D-WA) co-sponsored a successful $2 billion funding increase for the National Institutes of Health, the first such research increase in over a decade.

Blunt has supported legislation benefitting tobacco company Philip Morris. His wife and second wife have served as lobbyists for Philip Morris in the past.

==== Judiciary ====
Blunt supported Trump's Supreme Court nominees, Brett Kavanaugh, Neil Gorsuch, and Amy Coney Barrett.

In September 2020, less than two months before the next presidential election, Blunt supported an immediate Senate vote on Trump's nominee to fill the Supreme Court vacancy caused by Justice Ruth Bader Ginsburg's death. In February 2016, Blunt rejected consideration of President Obama's Supreme Court nominee during a presidential election year, opining that the "Senate should not confirm a new Supreme Court justice until we have a new president."

==== National security ====
Blunt supported President Donald Trump's 2017 executive order to temporarily curtail Muslim immigration until better screening methods are devised. He stated "[Trump] is doing what he told the American people he would do. I would not support a travel ban on Muslims; I do support increased vetting on people applying to travel from countries with extensive terrorist ties or activity. These seven countries meet that standard. Our top priority should be to keep Americans safe."

On May 28, 2021, Blunt abstained from voting on the creation of an independent commission to investigate the Capitol riot.

==== LGBT rights ====
In 2013, Blunt voted against Employment Non-Discrimination Act, which would have outlawed employer discrimination based on sexuality or gender identity. In 2022, Blunt stated his support for gay marriage, recanting his longstanding opposition, and later that year voted for the Respect for Marriage Act.

==== Social Security and Medicare ====
Blunt has argued for the need to reduce fraud and waste in Medicare and Social Security. He has spoken out for the need to reform entitlement programs such as Medicare and Social Security. In 2016 AARP said of Blunt, "He said in 2010 that he remained open to the idea of individual Social Security accounts. His position hasn't changed, but he has maintained for years that it's not a viable issue for anyone."

==== Trade ====
Blunt has been a supporter of free-trade agreements. The Springfield News-Leader wrote: "[Blunt] has supported a spate of free-trade agreements during his nearly 20 years in Congress, including a U.S-Singapore deal in 2003, the Central American Free Trade agreement in 2005 and the U.S-Korea agreement in 2011." After early enthusiasm, Blunt has been ambivalent about supporting the Trans Pacific Partnership (TPP).

==== Veterans ====
In February 2017, along with Democrat Joe Manchin, Blunt introduced the HIRE Veterans Act, legislation that would recognize qualified employers in the event that they met particular criteria designed to encourage businesses that are friendly toward veterans. These include the percentages of new hires or overall workforce who are veterans, the availability of particular types of training and leadership development opportunities, and other factors that show an employer's commitment to support veterans after their military careers. The bill was signed into law on November 30, 2021.

=== 2016 election ===
Blunt ran for re-election to the U.S. Senate in 2016. He won the Republican primary with 73% of the vote and faced Democrat Jason Kander in the November 2016 general election on November 8, 2016. Blunt won with 49.2% of the vote to Kander's 46.4%.

=== 2020 presidential election ===
On November 6, 2020, while Chair of the Senate Republican Policy Committee and the fourth-ranking Republican in the Senate, Blunt said Trump "should turn this discussion over to his lawyers" and "you can't stop the count in one state and decide you want the count to continue in another state. That might be how you'd like to see the system work but that's not how the system works." The previous night, Trump had alleged that Democrats were "stealing" the election.

The St. Louis Post-Dispatch published an editorial criticizing Blunt and Senator Josh Hawley for not distancing themselves from the January 6 United States Capitol attack and their continued support for Trump. Both senators voted for acquittal in Trump's second impeachment trial.

== Family and personal life ==
Blunt has been married twice. He married Roseann Ray in May 1967; he had three children with her: Matt, the former governor of Missouri, Amy Blunt Mosby and Andrew Blunt. All three children are corporate lobbyists. Some critics have criticized Andrew's dual professional roles as both a lobbyist for firms that might benefit from his father's influence and his father's campaign manager. Matt Blunt is also a lobbyist, as is his wife. The Blunts say they are careful not to seek influence for their clients with Senator Blunt.

Blunt married Abigail Perlman, a lobbyist for Kraft Foods and Philip Morris, in 2003. In April 2006, he and Perlman adopted Charlie Blunt, an 18-month-old boy from Russia. The family lives in Washington, D.C., and also own a condo in Springfield, Missouri. Roy Blunt has six grandchildren. He is a practicing Southern Baptist.

On August 9, 2021, Blunt was appointed an Honorary Officer of the Order of Australia (AO) "for distinguished service to Australia's bilateral relationship with the United States of America, in particular to the joint Free Trade Agreement".

On February 14, 2023, Blunt was elected as president of The State Historical Society of Missouri where he has been a trustee since 2005.

== ACU rating ==
For 2020, Blunt received a score of 74 from the American Conservative Union. He has a lifetime rating of 85.

== Electoral history ==
1998 United States House of Representatives elections, Missouri 7th
Party	Candidate	Votes	%	±%
Republican	Roy Blunt (incumbent)	129,746	72.6%	
Democratic	Marc Perkel	43,146	24.3%	
Libertarian	Mike Harman	5,639	3.2%	
Total votes		178,801	100%	
Majority		80,691	45.1%	
Turnout				
Republican hold		Swing		

2002 United States House of Representatives elections, Missouri 7th
Party	Candidate	Votes	%	±%
Republican	Roy Blunt (incumbent)	149,519	74.81%	
Democratic	Roland Roy Lapham	45,964	23.00%	
Libertarian	Douglas Andrew Burlison	4,378	2.19%	
Other	Steven L. Reed	2	0.00%	
Total votes		199,863	100%	
Majority				
Turnout				
Republican hold		Swing		

2004 United States House of Representatives elections, Missouri 7th
Party	Candidate	Votes	%	±%
Republican	Roy Blunt (incumbent)	210,080	70.45%	
Democratic	Jim Newberry	84,356	28.29%	
Libertarian	James K. Craig	2,767	0.93%	
Constitution	Steve Alger	1,002	0.34%	
Total votes		298,205	100%	
Majority				
Turnout				
Republican hold		Swing		

2006 United States House of Representatives elections, Missouri 7th
Party	Candidate	Votes	%	±%
Republican	Roy Blunt (incumbent)	160,942	66.75%	
Democratic	Jack Truman	75,592	30.11%	
Libertarian	Kevin Craig	7,566	3.14%	
Other	Frazier Glenn Miller Jr.	23	0.01%	
Total votes		241,123	100%	
Majority				
Turnout				
Republican hold		Swing		

2008 United States House of Representatives elections, Missouri 7th
Party	Candidate	Votes	%	±%
Republican	Roy Blunt (incumbent)	219,016	67.76%	
Democratic	Richard Monroe	91,010	28.16%	
Libertarian	Kevin Craig	6,971	2.16%	
Constitution	Travis Maddox	6,166	1.91%	
Other	Midge Potts	49	0.02%	
Total votes		323,212	100%	
Majority				
Turnout				
Republican hold		Swing		

Republican primary results
Party	Candidate	Votes	%
Republican	Roy Blunt	411,040	70.9%
Republican	Chuck Purgason	75,663	13.1%
Republican	Kristi Nichols	40,744	7.0%
Republican	Deborah Solomon	15,099	2.6%
Republican	Hector Maldonado	8,731	1.5%
Republican	Davis Conway	8,525	1.5%
Republican	R.L. Praprotnik	8,047	1.4%
Republican	Tony Laszacs	6,309	1.1%
Republican	Mike Vontz	5,190	0.9%
Total votes		579,348	100.00%

2010 United States Senate election in Missouri
Party	Candidate	Votes	%	±%
Republican	Roy Blunt	1,054,160	54.23%	−1.86%
Democratic	Robin Carnahan	789,736	40.63%	−2.17%
Libertarian	Jonathan Dine	58,663	3.02%	+2.29%
Constitution	Jerry Beck	41,309	2.13%	+1.74%
Majority		264,424	13.60%	
Total votes		1,943,868	100.00%	
Republican hold		Swing		

2016 Missouri Republican Senate primary election
Party	Candidate	Votes	%
Republican	Roy Blunt (incumbent)	481,444	72.55%
Republican	Kristi Nichols	134,025	20.20%
Republican	Ryan Luethy	29,328	4.42%
Republican	Bernie Mowinski	18,789	2.83%
Total votes		663,586	100.00%

2016 United States Senate election in Missouri
Party	Candidate	Votes	%	±%
Republican	Roy Blunt (incumbent)	1,378,458	49.18%	−5.05%
Democratic	Jason Kander	1,300,200	46.39%	+5.76%
Libertarian	Jonathan Dine	67,738	2.42%	−0.60%
Green	Johnathan McFarland	30,743	1.10%	N/A
Constitution	Fred Ryman	25,407	0.91%	−1.22%
n/a	Write-ins	95	0.00%	N/A
Majority		78,258	2.79%	
Total votes		2,802,641	100.0%	
Republican hold				

Party political offices
Preceded by Bill Phelps	Republican nominee for Lieutenant Governor of Missouri; 1980	Succeeded by Mel Hancock
Preceded by Walter Pfeffer	Republican nominee for Secretary of State of Missouri; 1984, 1988	Succeeded by John Hancock
Preceded by Dennis Hastert	House Republican Chief Deputy Whip; 1999–2003	Succeeded by Eric Cantor
Preceded by Tom DeLay	House Republican Deputy Leader; Acting; 2005–2006	Succeeded by John Boehner
Preceded by John Boehner	House Republican Deputy Leader; 2007–2009	Succeeded by Eric Cantor
Preceded by Kit Bond	Republican nominee for U.S. Senator from Missouri (Class 3); 2010, 2016	Succeeded by Eric Schmitt
Preceded by John Barrasso	Vice Chair of the Senate Republican Conference; 2012–2019	Succeeded by Joni Ernst
Preceded by John Barrasso	Chair of the Senate Republican Policy Committee; 2019–2023	Succeeded by Joni Ernst
Political offices
Preceded by James Kirkpatrick	Secretary of State of Missouri; 1985–1993	Succeeded by Judi Moriarty
Academic offices
Preceded by Wayne Gott; Acting	President of Southwest Baptist University; 1993–1996	Succeeded by C. Pat Taylor
U.S. House of Representatives
Preceded by Mel Hancock	Member of the U.S. House of Representatives from Missouri's 7th congressional district 1997–2011	Succeeded by Billy Long
Preceded by Tom DeLay	House Majority Whip; 2003–2007	Succeeded by Jim Clyburn
Preceded by Tom DeLay	House Majority Leader; Acting; 2005–2006	Succeeded by John Boehner
Preceded by Steny Hoyer	House Minority Whip; 2007–2009	Succeeded by Eric Cantor
U.S. Senate
Preceded by Kit Bond	U.S. Senator (Class 3) from Missouri; 2011–2023; Served alongside: Claire McCaskill, Josh Hawley	Succeeded by Eric Schmitt
Preceded by Gregg Harper	Chair of the Joint Library Committee; 2015–2017	Succeeded by Gregg Harper
Preceded by Chuck Schumer	Chair of the Senate Rules Committee; 2015–2017	Succeeded by Richard Shelby
Preceded by Chuck Schumer	Chair of the Joint Inaugural Ceremonies Committee; 2016–2020	Succeeded by Amy Klobuchar
Preceded by Richard Shelby	Chair of the Senate Rules Committee; 2018–2021	Succeeded by Amy Klobuchar
Preceded by Richard Shelby	Chair of the Joint Printing Committee; 2018–2019	Succeeded by Zoe Lofgren
Preceded by Gregg Harper	Chair of the Joint Library Committee; 2019–2021	Succeeded by Zoe Lofgren
Preceded by Amy Klobuchar	Ranking Member of the Senate Rules Committee; 2021–2023	Succeeded by Deb Fischer
U.S. order of precedence (ceremonial)
Preceded by Claire McCaskill as Former U.S. Senator	Order of precedence of the United States as Former U.S. Senator	Succeeded by Blanche Lincoln as Former U.S. Senator
