= 2016 United States Senate election in Missouri =

- November 8, 2016
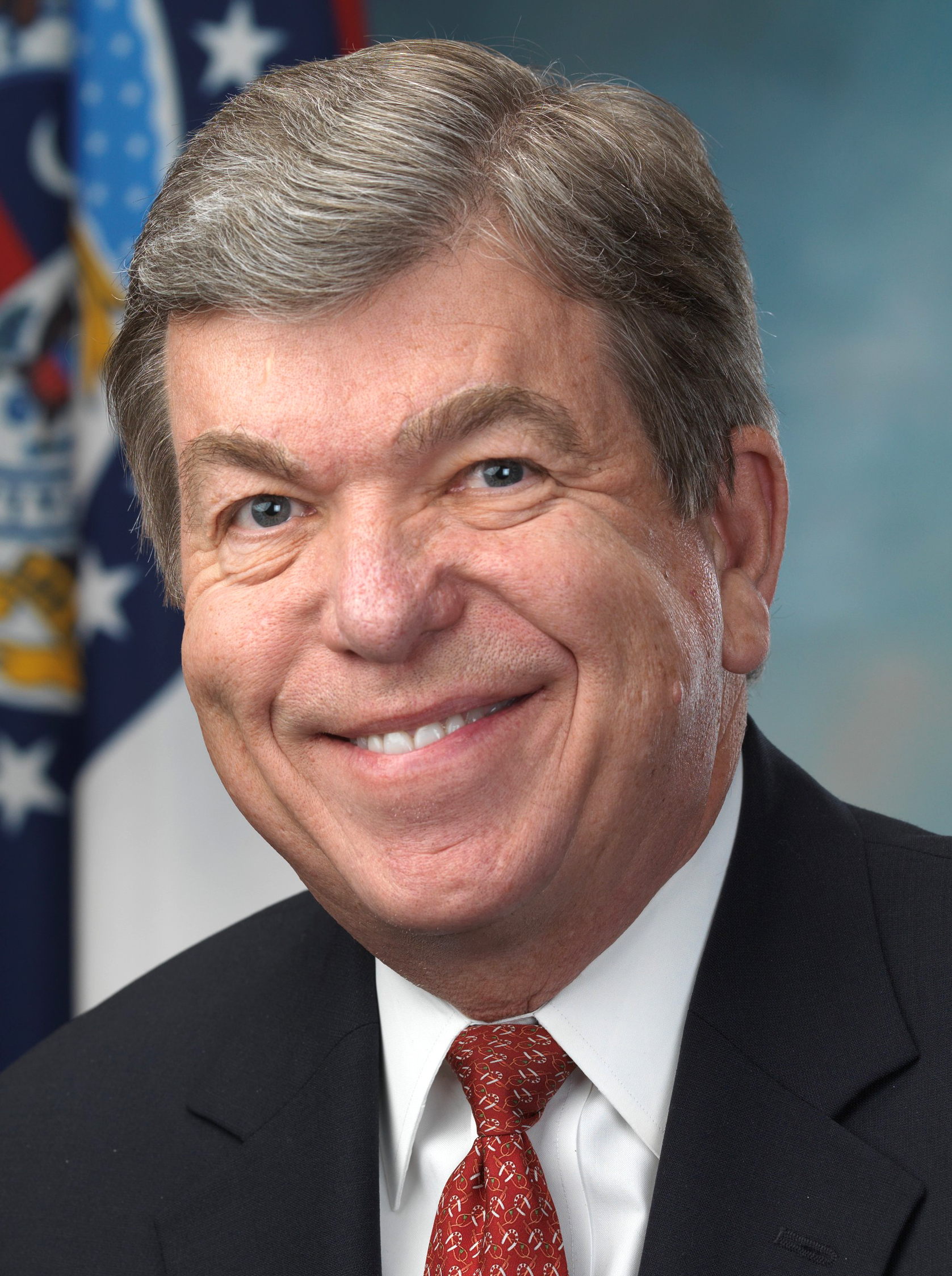

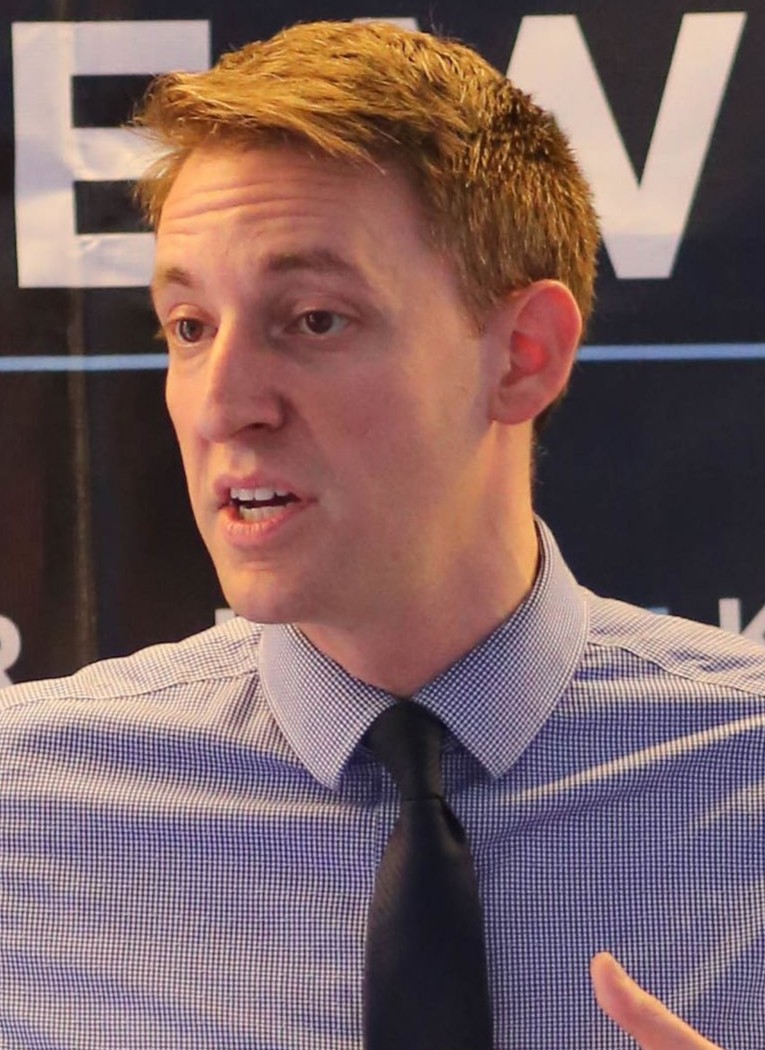
Nominee	Roy Blunt	Jason Kander
Party	Republican	Democratic
Popular vote	1,378,458	1,300,200
Percentage	49.18%	46.39%
- Blunt: 40–50% 50–60% 60–70% 70–80% 80–90% >90% Kander: 40–50% 50–60% 60–70% 70–80% 80–90% >90% Tie: 40–50% 50% No votes
U.S. senator before election
Roy Blunt
Republican
Elected U.S. Senator
Roy Blunt
Republican

The 2016 United States Senate election in Missouri was held on November 8, 2016, to elect a member of the United States Senate to represent the State of Missouri. It was held concurrently with the 2016 U.S. presidential election, other elections to the United States Senate in other states, elections to the United States House of Representatives, and various state and local elections. The primaries were held on August 2.

Incumbent Republican Senator Roy Blunt won re-election to a second term in office, defeating Democratic Missouri Secretary of State Jason Kander. Despite losing, Kander's margin of defeat was 15.7 percentage points closer than that of Democratic presidential nominee Hillary Clinton in the concurrent presidential election in the state. This was also the closest a Democrat had come to winning this seat since 1980.

== Republican primary ==
Despite being considered an "establishment" Republican, Blunt did not face serious Tea Party opposition due to his efforts to cultivate relationships with activists in Missouri, his effectiveness at "threading the needle" by keeping conservative and establishment Republicans fairly satisfied, and the open gubernatorial election, which attracted the most attention from Republicans.

=== Candidates ===
==== Declared ====
- Roy Blunt, incumbent senator since 2011
- Ryan Luethy, financial services worker
- Bernie Mowinski, retired Army sergeant and perennial candidate
- Kristi Nichols, sales manager, Tea Party activist and candidate for the U.S. Senate in 2010

==== Withdrew ====
- Christopher Batsche, businessman (running for MO-07)

==== Declined ====
- Todd Akin, former U.S. representative from 2001 to 2013 and nominee for the U.S. Senate in 2012
- John Brunner, businessman and candidate for the U.S. Senate in 2012 (running for governor)
- John Lamping, former state senator

=== Endorsements ===
Roy Blunt

Presidents

- George W. Bush, 43rd president of the United States

U.S. senators

- John Cornyn, Texas; Senate majority whip
- Ted Cruz, Texas; 2016 presidential candidate

U.S. representatives

- Paul Ryan, 54th speaker of the House and U.S. representative (WI-01)

Individuals

- John R. Bolton, former United States ambassador to the United Nations
- Carly Fiorina, former CEO of Hewlett-Packard, 2010 California nominee for U.S. Senate, and 2016 presidential candidate

Organizations

- National Federation of Independent Business
- National Rifle Association of America
- United States Chamber of Commerce

=== Polling ===
Poll source	Date(s) administered	Sample size	Margin of error	Roy Blunt	Kristi Nichols	Bernie Mowinski	Ryan Luethy	Undecided
St. Louis Post-Dispatch/Mason-Dixon	July 23–27, 2016	400	± 5.0%	66%	9%	5%	1%	19%

Hypothetical polling

Poll source	Date(s) administered	Sample size	Margin of error	Roy Blunt	John Brunner	Other	Undecided
Remington Research Group	January 2015	1,355	± ?	60%	40%	—	—
Remington Research Group	February 2–3, 2015	747	3.6%	50%	19%	—	32%

=== Results ===
Results by county: Blunt: 60–70%; 70–80%; 80–90%

Republican primary results
Party	Candidate	Votes	%
Republican	Roy Blunt (incumbent)	481,444	72.55%
Republican	Kristi Nichols	134,025	20.20%
Republican	Ryan Luethy	29,328	4.42%
Republican	Bernie Mowinski	18,789	2.83%
Total votes		663,586	100.00%

== Democratic primary ==
=== Candidates ===
==== Declared ====
- Cori Bush, pastor, nurse and co-director of the Truth Telling Project
- Jason Kander, secretary of state of Missouri since 2013
- Robert Mack, military veteran
- Chief Wana Dubie, marijuana activist

==== Declined ====
- Jay Nixon, governor of Missouri since 2009
- Mike Sanders, Jackson County executive, former Jackson County prosecuting attorney and former chairman of the Missouri Democratic Party
- Clint Zweifel, state treasurer of Missouri since 2009

=== Endorsements ===
Jason Kander

Vice presidents

- Joe Biden, 47th vice president of the United States

Governors

- Jay Nixon, Missouri

U.S. senators

- Al Franken, Minnesota
- Martin Heinrich, New Mexico
- Claire McCaskill, Missouri
- Harry Reid, Nevada and Senate minority leader
- Jon Tester, Montana
- Elizabeth Warren, Massachusetts

U.S. representatives

- Emanuel Cleaver II, Missouri

Statewide officials

- Chris Koster, Missouri attorney general and candidate for governor of Missouri
- Clint Zweifel, Missouri state treasurer

Organizations

- Americans for Responsible Solutions
- Daily Kos
- League of Conservation Voters
- Planned Parenthood
- Sierra Club

=== Polling ===
Poll source	Date(s) administered	Sample size	Margin of error	Jason Kander	Cori Bush	Robert Mack	Chief Wana Dubie	Undecided
St. Louis Post-Dispatch/Mason-Dixon	July 23–27, 2016	400	± 5.0%	67%	7%	4%	2%	20%

=== Results ===
Results by county: Kander: 40–50%; 50–60%; 60–70%; 70–80%

Democratic primary results
Party	Candidate	Votes	%
Democratic	Jason Kander	223,492	69.87%
Democratic	Cori Bush	42,453	13.27%
Democratic	Chief Wana Dubie	30,432	9.51%
Democratic	Robert Mack	23,509	7.35%
Total votes		319,886	100.00%

== Third party and independent candidates ==
=== Libertarian primary ===
==== Candidates ====
===== Declared =====
- Jonathan Dine, nominee for the U.S. Senate in 2010 and 2012
- Herschel Young

==== Results ====
Libertarian primary results
Party	Candidate	Votes	%
Libertarian	Jonathan Dine	2,002	54.90%
Libertarian	Herschel Young	1,642	45.06%
Total votes		3,644	100.00%

=== Constitution primary ===
==== Candidates ====
===== Declared =====
- Fred Ryman

==== Results ====
Constitution primary results
Party	Candidate	Votes	%
Constitution	Fred Ryman	545	100.00%
Total votes		545	100.00%

=== Green Party ===
==== Candidates ====
===== Declared =====
- Johnathan McFarland

=== Write-in ===
- Gina Bufe
- Patrick Lee

== General election ==
=== Debates ===
Date	Host	Moderator	Link(s)	Participants				
Key: P Participant A Absent N Non-invitee I Invitee W Withdrawn								
Key: P Participant A Absent N Non-invitee I Invitee W Withdrawn				Roy Blunt	Jonathan Dine	Jason Kander	Jonathan McFarland	Fred Ryman
September 30, 2016	Associated Press	David Lieb		P	P	P	P	P

=== Predictions ===
Source	Ranking	As of
The Cook Political Report	Tossup	November 2, 2016
Sabato's Crystal Ball	Lean R	November 7, 2016
Rothenberg Political Report	Tossup	November 3, 2016
Daily Kos	Lean R	November 8, 2016
Real Clear Politics	Tossup	November 7, 2016

=== Polling ===
View source data.

Poll source	Date(s) administered	Sample size	Margin of error	Roy Blunt (R)	Jason Kander (D)	Other	Undecided
SurveyMonkey	November 1–7, 2016	1,368	± 4.6%	44%	51%	—	5%
SurveyMonkey	October 31 – November 6, 2016	1,119	± 4.6%	43%	51%	—	6%
Emerson College	November 4–5, 2016	750	± 3.5%	45%	46%	5%	4%
SurveyMonkey	October 28 – November 3, 2016	879	± 4.6%	45%	51%	—	4%
Clarity Campaign Labs	November 1–2, 2016	1,036	± 3.1%	47%	45%	—	8%
SurveyMonkey	October 27 – November 2, 2016	774	± 4.6%	45%	51%	—	4%
Public Policy Polling	October 31 – November 1, 2016	1,083	± 3.0%	46%	44%	—	9%
Missouri Times/Remington Research Group (R)	October 31 – November 1, 2016	1,722	± 2.4%	48%	44%	3%	5%
DFM Research	October 27 – November 1, 2016	508	± 4.4%	41%	41%	9%	9%
SurveyMonkey	October 26 – November 1, 2016	649	± 4.6%	46%	50%	—	4%
Emerson College	October 28–31, 2016	650	± 3.8%	45%	45%	6%	4%
Monmouth University	October 28–31, 2016	405	± 4.9%	47%	46%	3%	5%
SurveyMonkey	October 25–31, 2016	671	± 4.6%	45%	51%	—	4%
Missouri Scout/BK Strategies (R)	October 27–28, 2016	1,698	± 2.4%	47%	44%	4%	5%
St. Louis Post-Dispatch/Mason-Dixon	October 24–26, 2016	625	± 4.0%	47%	46%	2%	5%
Emerson College	October 17–19, 2016	600	± 3.9%	44%	44%	4%	8%
Google Consumer Surveys	October 12–14, 2016	521	± 4.2%	45%	52%	—	3%
Monmouth University	October 9–11, 2016	406	± 4.9%	46%	44%	3%	7%
Emerson College	September 9–13, 2016	600	± 3.6%	40%	42%	10%	8%
Missouri Scout/Remington Research Group (R)	September 1–2, 2016	1,275	± 3.0%	47%	40%	—	13%
Public Policy Polling	August 26–27, 2016	1,055	± 3.0%	47%	43%	—	10%
Monmouth University	August 19–22, 2016	401	± 4.9%	48%	43%	3%	7%
Remington Research Group (R)	August 5–6, 2016	1,280	± 3.0%	47%	40%	6%	7%
St. Louis Post-Dispatch/Mason-Dixon	July 23–24, 2016	625	± 4.0%	47%	43%	—	10%
Public Policy Polling	July 11–12, 2016	959	± 3.2%	41%	38%	—	21%
Missouri Scout/Remington Research Group (R)	March 25–26, 2016	927	± 3.2%	44%	37%	—	19%
DFM Research	March 17–24, 2016	674	± 3.8%	49%	35%	2%	14%
Missouri Scout/Remington Research Group (R)	October 30–31, 2015	783	± 3.5%	43%	33%	—	23%
Public Policy Polling	August 7–9, 2015	859	± 3.3%	40%	35%	—	25%
Remington Research Group (R)	February 19, 2015	957	± 3.2%	49%	36%	—	14%

=== Results ===
2016 United States Senate election in Missouri
Party	Candidate	Votes	%	±%
Republican	Roy Blunt (incumbent)	1,378,458	49.18%	−5.05%
Democratic	Jason Kander	1,300,200	46.39%	+5.76%
Libertarian	Jonathan Dine	67,738	2.42%	−0.60%
Green	Johnathan McFarland	30,743	1.10%	N/A
Constitution	Fred Ryman	25,407	0.91%	−1.22%
Write-in		95	0.03%	N/A
Total votes		2,802,641	100.00%	N/A
Republican hold				

==== Counties that flipped from Republican to Democratic ====
- Boone (largest city: Columbia)
- Clay (largest city: Kansas City (Note: Most of the city lies within Jackson County, with portions spilling into Clay, Cass, and Platte counties.))
- Platte (largest city: Kansas City)

==== By congressional district ====
Blunt won six of eight congressional districts.

District	Blunt	Kander	Representative
1st	17%	79%	Lacy Clay
2nd	48.3%	48.2%	Ann Wagner
3rd	55%	40%	Blaine Luetkemeyer
4th	56%	39%	Vicky Hartzler
5th	34%	61%	Emanuel Cleaver
6th	54%	41%	Sam Graves
7th	64%	32%	Billy Long
8th	63%	33%	Jason Smith

== See also ==
- United States Senate elections, 2016
