= 1984 Missouri lieutenant gubernatorial election =

- November 6, 1984
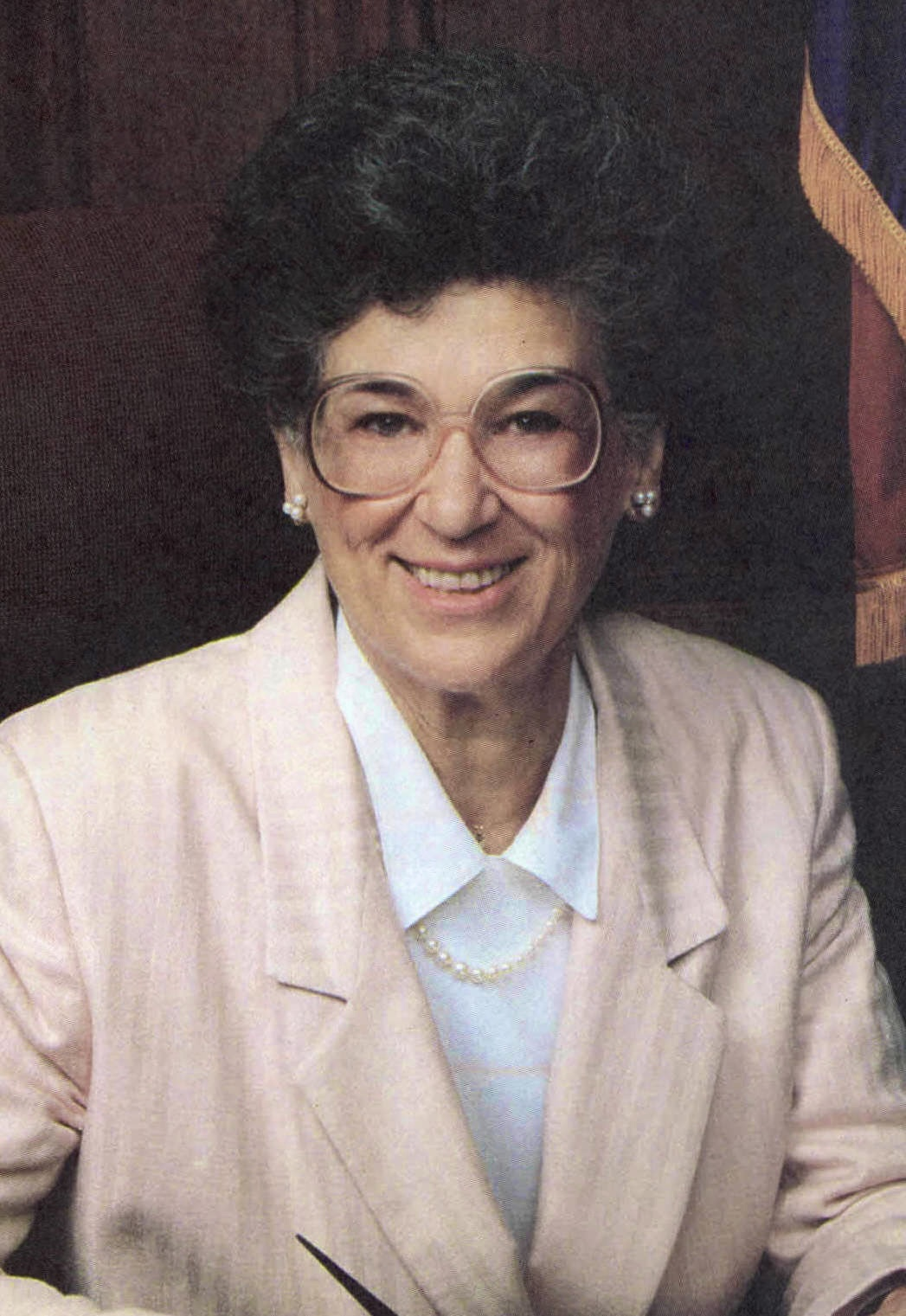

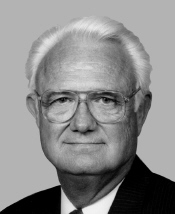
Nominee	Harriett Woods	Mel Hancock
Party	Democratic	Republican
Popular vote	1,125,191	965,470
Percentage	53.8%	46.2%
- County results Woods: 50–60% 60–70% 70–80% Hancock: 50–60% 60–70%
Lieutenant Governor before election
Ken Rothman
Democratic
Elected Lieutenant Governor
Harriett Woods
Democratic

The 1984 Missouri lieutenant gubernatorial election was held on November 6, 1984. Democratic nominee Harriett Woods defeated Republican nominee Mel Hancock with 53.82% of the vote.

== Primary elections ==
Primary elections were held on August 7, 1984.

=== Democratic primary ===
==== Candidates ====
- Harriett Woods, State Senator
- LeRoy D. Braungardt, State Representative

==== Results ====
Democratic primary results
Party	Candidate	Votes	%
Democratic	Harriett Woods	376,674	74.34
Democratic	LeRoy D. Braungardt	129,993	25.66
Total votes		506,667	100.00

=== Republican primary ===
==== Candidates ====
- Mel Hancock, businessman
- Nate Walker, State Representative
- Tom Baldwin
- David R. Countie, former State Representative

==== Results ====
Republican primary results
Party	Candidate	Votes	%
Republican	Mel Hancock	153,449	46.93
Republican	Nate Walker	118,901	36.37
Republican	Tom Baldwin	42,463	12.99
Republican	David R. Countie	12,131	3.71
Total votes		326,944	100.00

== General election ==
=== Candidates ===
- Harriett Woods, Democratic
- Mel Hancock, Republican

=== Results ===
1984 Missouri lieutenant gubernatorial election
Party	Candidate	Votes	%	±%
Democratic	Harriett Woods	1,125,191	53.82%	
Republican	Mel Hancock	965,470	46.18%	
Majority		159,721		
Turnout				
Democratic hold		Swing		
