= 1972 Missouri Attorney General election =

- November 7, 1972
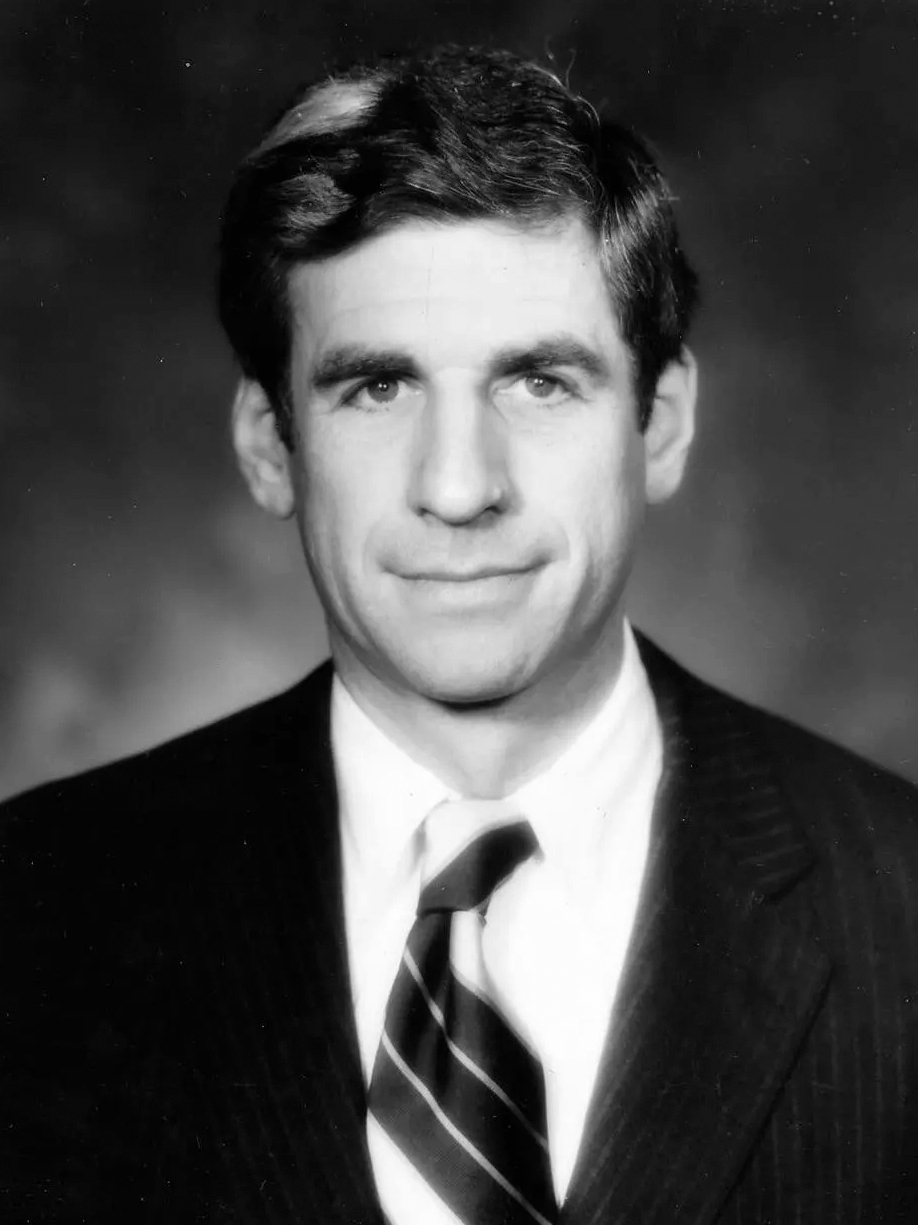

Nominee	John Danforth	James E. Spain
Party	Republican	Democratic
Popular vote	1,146,926	687,066
Percentage	62.54%	37.46%
Attorney General before election
John Danforth
Republican
Elected Attorney General
John Danforth
Republican

The 1972 Missouri Attorney General election was held on November 7, 1972, in order to elect the attorney general of Missouri. Republican nominee and incumbent attorney general John Danforth defeated Democratic nominee and incumbent member of the Missouri House of Representatives James E. Spain.

== General election ==
On election day, November 7, 1972, Republican nominee John Danforth won re-election by a margin of 459,860 votes against his opponent Democratic nominee James E. Spain, thereby retaining Republican control over the office of attorney general. Danforth was sworn in for his second term on January 8, 1973.

=== Results ===
Missouri Attorney General election, 1972
Party	Candidate	Votes	%
Republican	John Danforth (incumbent)	1,146,926	62.54
Democratic	James E. Spain	687,066	37.46
Total votes		1,833,994	100.00
Republican hold			

== See also ==
- 1972 Missouri gubernatorial election
