= 1982 United States Senate election in Missouri =

- November 2, 1982
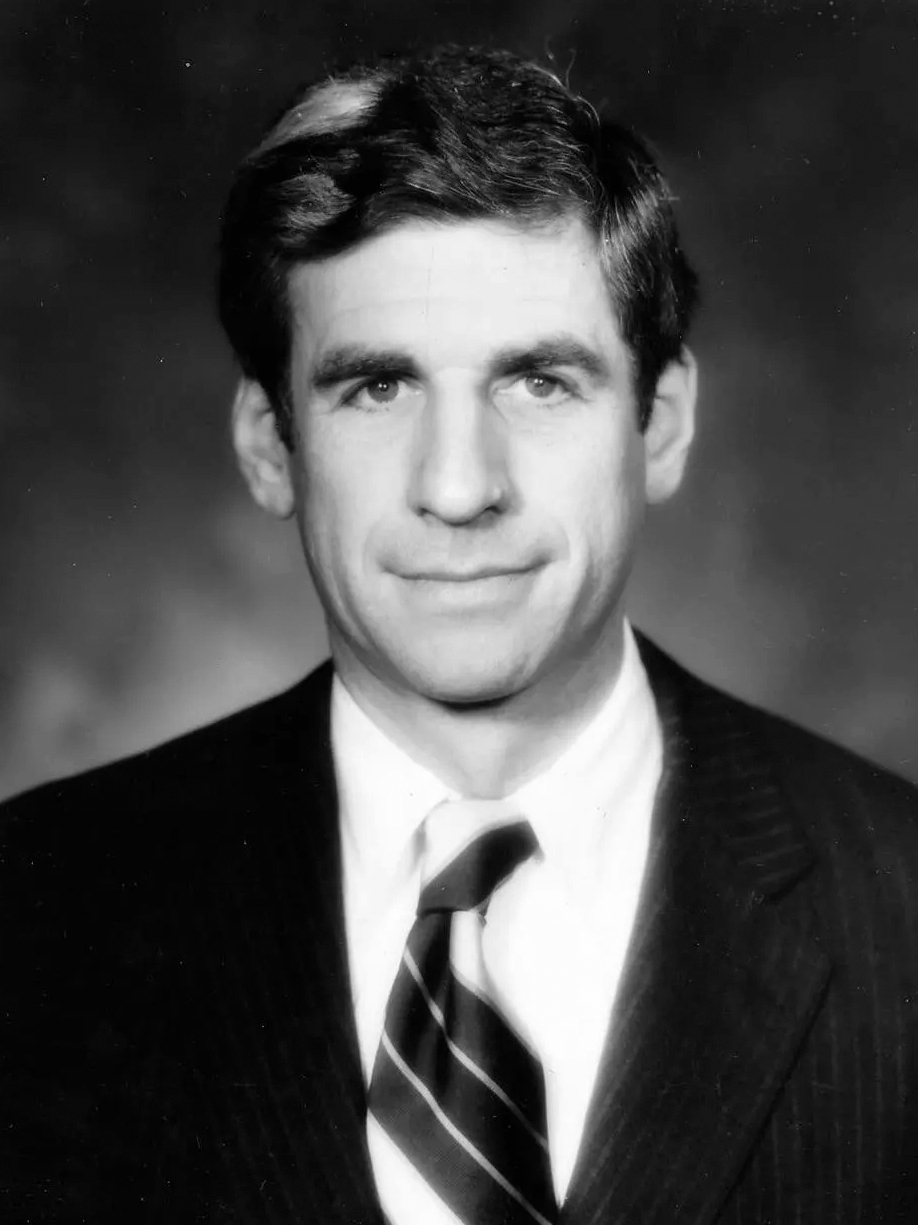

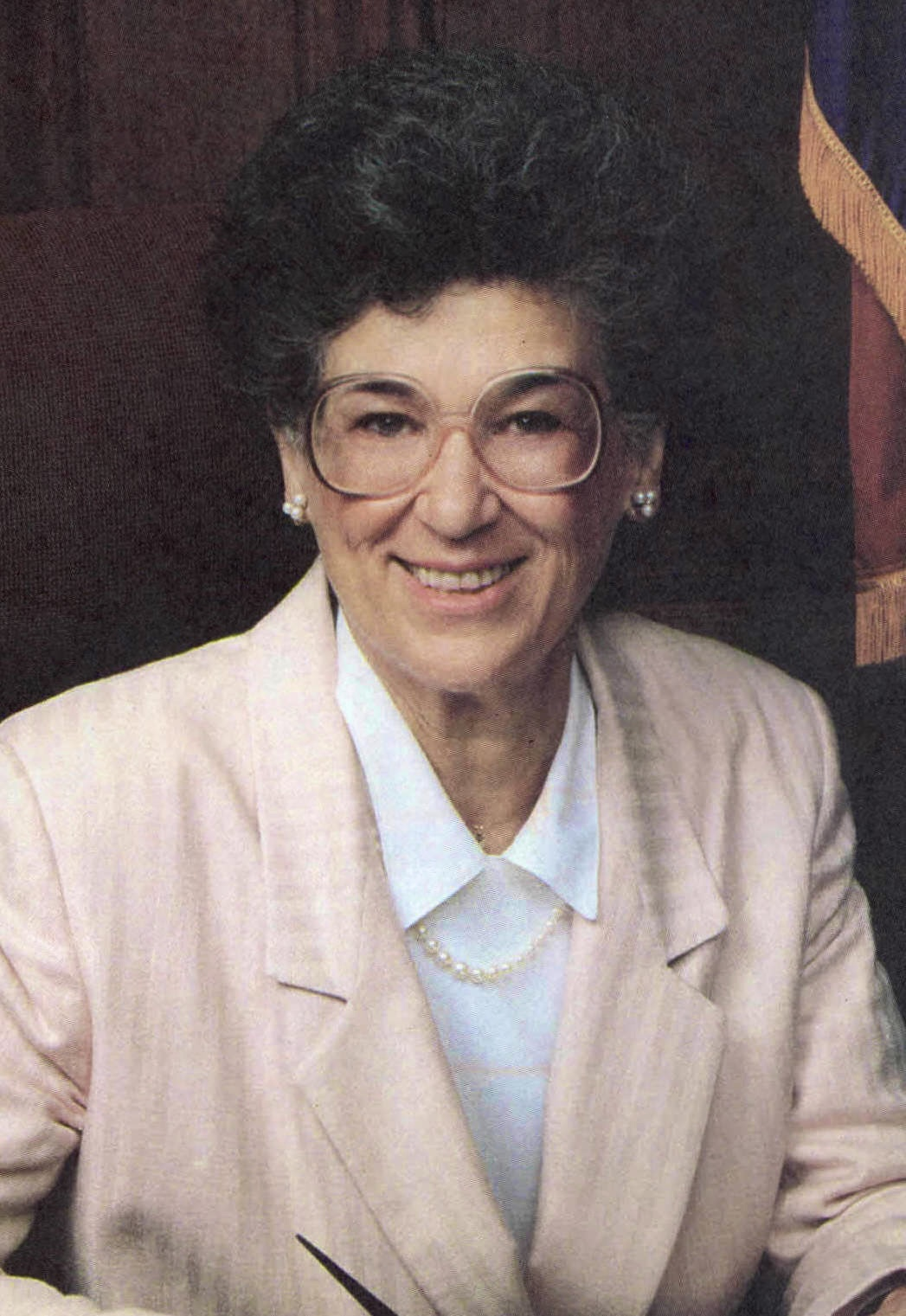
Nominee	John Danforth	Harriett Woods
Party	Republican	Democratic
Popular vote	784,876	758,629
Percentage	50.85%	49.15%
- County results Danforth: 50–60% 60–70% Woods: 50–60% 60–70%
U.S. senator before election
John Danforth
Republican
Elected U.S. Senator
John Danforth
Republican

The 1982 United States Senate election in Missouri was held on November 2, 1982.

Incumbent Senator John Danforth was re-elected to a second term in office, defeating State Sen. Harriett Woods.

== Republican primary ==
=== Candidates ===
- John Danforth, incumbent U.S. senator
- Mel Hancock, state representative from Springfield
- Gregory Hansman, perennial candidate
- Vernon Riehl, nominee for Missouri's 10th congressional district in 1950

=== Results ===
Danforth: 40–50%; 50–60%; 60–70%; 70–80%; 80–90%; >90%; Hancock: 50–60%

1982 Republican U.S. Senate primary
Party	Candidate	Votes	%
Republican	John Danforth (incumbent)	217,162	73.91%
Republican	Mel Hancock	61,378	20.89%
Republican	Gregory Hansman	7,846	2.67%
Republican	Vernon Riehl	7,443	2.53%
Total votes		293,829	100.00%

== Democratic primary ==
=== Candidates ===
- Burleigh Arnold, Jefferson City banker
- Theodis Brown Sr.
- Herb Fillmore, candidate for Senate in 1980
- Larry D. Hurt, Butler County resident
- Betty Jane Jackson, Pemiscot County resident
- Sidney L. Phillips
- Tom Ryan, consumer advocate from St. Louis
- Judith Soignet
- Lee C. Sutton, former State Representative from Columbia and candidate for Senate in 1980
- Harriett Woods, State Senator from University City
- Tom Zych, State Representative from St. Louis

=== Results ===
Woods: 20–30%; 30–40%; 40–50%; 50–60%; 60–70%; Arnold: 20–30%; 30–40%; 40–50%; 50–60%; 60–70%; Ryan: 20–30%; 40–50%; Jackson: 30–40%

1982 Democratic U.S. Senate primary
Party	Candidate	Votes	%
Democratic	Harriett Woods	263,259	44.80%
Democratic	Burleigh Arnold	140,446	23.90%
Democratic	Tom Ryan	75,599	12.86%
Democratic	Tom Zych	35,876	6.10%
Democratic	Betty Jane Jackson	21,002	3.57%
Democratic	Lee C. Sutton	12,363	2.10%
Democratic	Herb Fillmore	10,951	1.86%
Democratic	Larry D. Hurt	10,232	1.74%
Democratic	Sidney Phillips	8,527	1.45%
Democratic	Theodis Brown, Sr.	5,322	0.91%
Democratic	Judith Soignet	4,114	0.70%
Total votes		587,701	100.00%

== General election ==
=== Results ===
General election results
Party	Candidate	Votes	%	±%
Republican	John Danforth (incumbent)	784,876	50.85%	▼6.08
Democratic	Harriett L. Woods	758,629	49.15%	▲6.66
Write-in	Joanne "Judy" Curran	9	0.00%	N/A
Write-in	Nell Elizabeth Pierce	7	0.00%	N/A
Total votes		1,543,521	100.00%	
Republican hold		Swing		

== See also ==
- 1982 United States Senate elections
