= Mel Hancock =

American politician (1929–2011)

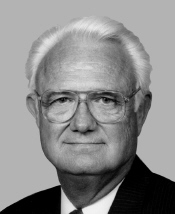

Member of the U.S. House of Representatives from Missouri's 7th district
- In office January 3, 1989 – January 3, 1997
- Preceded by: Gene Taylor
- Succeeded by: Roy Blunt

Personal details
- Born: September 14, 1929 Cape Fair, Missouri, U.S.
- Died: November 6, 2011 (aged 82) Springfield, Missouri, U.S.
- Party: Republican
- Spouse: Sug Hancock
- Education: Missouri State University (BS)

Melton D. Hancock (September 14, 1929 – November 6, 2011) was a member of the United States House of Representatives from Missouri's 7th congressional district.

== Early life ==
Hancock was born in Cape Fair, Missouri. In 1936, he started school in Carthage, Missouri. From 1936 to 1941, he attended school in Springfield, Missouri. During World War II from 1941 to 1945, he attended school in Amarillo, Texas; Topeka, Kansas and Sioux City, Iowa. From 1945 to 1947, he attended high school in Springfield, Missouri, graduating in 1947. He received his Bachelor of Science degree from Southwest Missouri State University (now Missouri State University) in 1951.

== Career ==
He enlisted in the United States Air Force in August 1951. In basic training, he was awarded the American Spirit Honor Medal. He attended the United States Air Force Officer Candidate School and earned the rank of second lieutenant in March 1953. Hancock was relieved from active duty in 1953, but continued to serve in the United States Air Force Inactive Reserve until 1965 and was discharged at the rank of first lieutenant.

Hancock worked full and part-time from 1947 to 1951 for International Harvester Company during college and from 1953 to 1959, when he resigned and returned to Springfield, Missouri to enter the insurance business, where he worked from 1959 to 1969. In 1969, he co-founded Federal Protection, Inc., a bank security equipment leasing company.

In 1977, he founded The Taxpayer Survival Association, a not-for-profit organization dedicated to educating the public on the principle of constitutional tax limitation. Hancock was the originator, catalyst, and primary organizer and author of an omnibus state and local tax limitation amendment to the Missouri Constitution passed by the voters of Missouri in 1980. Placed on the ballot by an initiative petition process led by Hancock, what is commonly referred to as "The Hancock Amendment", consisted of new sections 16 to 24 of Article 10 of the Missouri Constitution. In general, subject to certain definitions, exceptions and enforcement processes outlined in the Hancock Amendment, the Hancock Amendment limited total state revenues and expenses in Missouri to a percentage of personal income of persons in Missouri, required the state of Missouri to continue to fund expenditures of local political subdivisions required by state law, and required new local tax, licenses or fees to be approved by the voters of such political subdivisions. The Hancock Amendment was one of the first state tax limitation amendments in the United States and is still in effect today. The Hancock Amendment was one of the first state tax limitation amendments passed in the United States and remains relevant today. In the mid 1990s, the State of Missouri refunded nearly a billion dollars to taxpayers after a Supreme Court ruling that the state had exceeded the limits of the Hancock Amendment. Today, the Hancock Amendment continues to be a hedge against new tax increases considered by the General Assembly, its members knowing that any significant tax increase must win voter adoption.

Advocating Constitutional Tax and Spending Amendment at the national level, he was a candidate for the Republican nomination for United States Senator in 1982, challenging incumbent Republican John Danforth, and a candidate for nomination as Lieutenant Governor of Missouri in 1984, losing out to Democrat Harriett Woods.

In 1988, Hancock was elected as a Republican to the 101st, 102nd, 103rd, and 104th Congresses, serving between January 3, 1989, and January 3, 1997. He was not a candidate for re-election to the 105th Congress.

== Personal life ==
Hancock resided in Springfield with his wife Alma "Sug" McDaniel, whom he married on November 17, 1951, until his death on November 6, 2011.

They had three children: two sons, one born in 1955 and one born in 1958, and one daughter born in 1969.

In December 2014, Hancock was announced as an inductee to the Hall of Famous Missourians. His bronze bust, created by Kansas City Sculptor, E. Spencer Schubert will be one of forty-four on permanent display in the Missouri State Capitol in Jefferson City.

Party political offices
Preceded by Roy Blunt	Republican nominee for Lieutenant Governor of Missouri; 1984	Succeeded by Richard B. "R.B." Grisham
U.S. House of Representatives
Preceded by Gene Taylor	Member of the U.S. House of Representatives from Missouri's 7th congressional district January 3, 1989 – January 3, 1997	Succeeded by Roy Blunt
