= Kit Bond =

American politician (1939–2025)

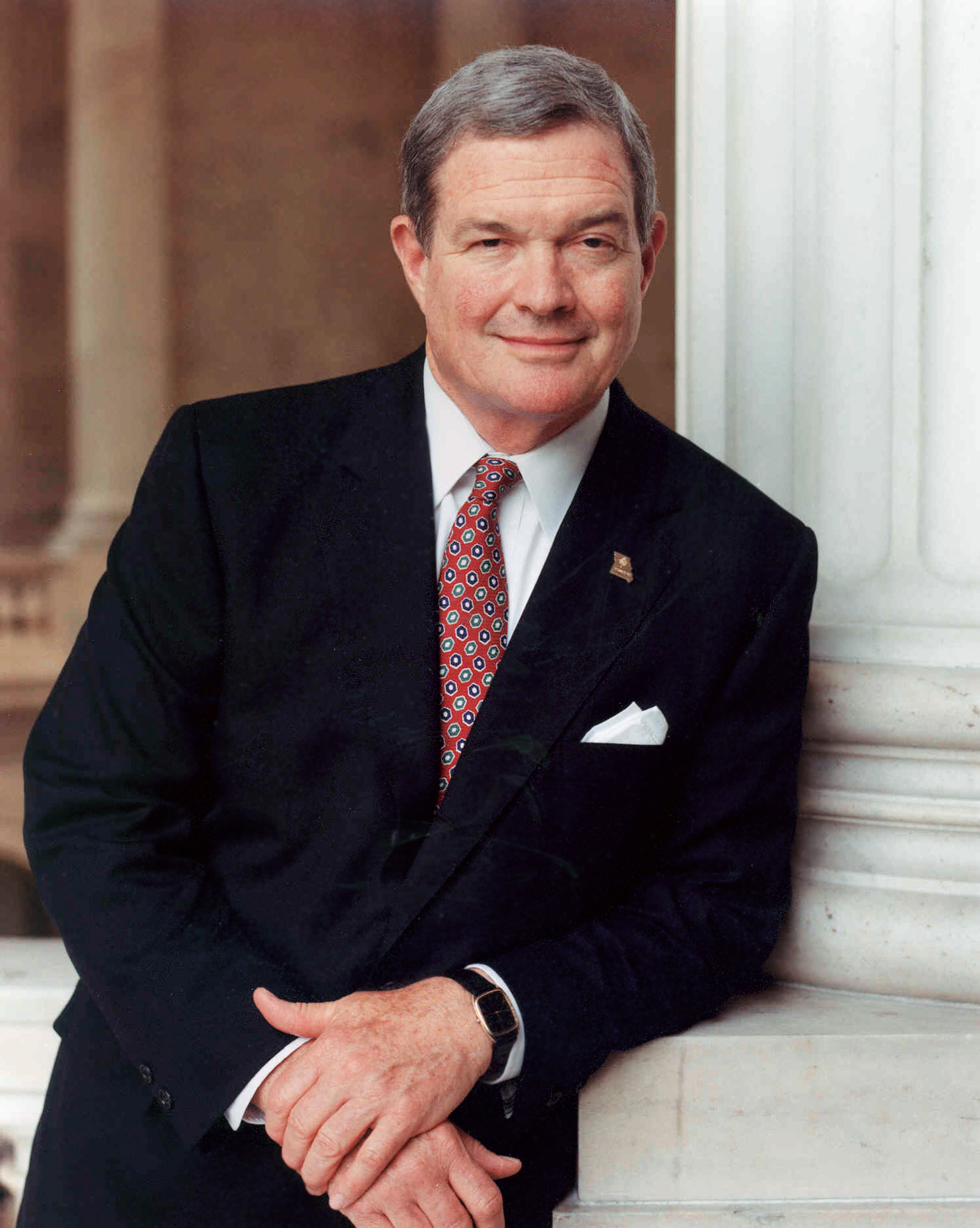

United States Senator from Missouri
- In office January 3, 1987 – January 3, 2011
- Preceded by: Thomas Eagleton
- Succeeded by: Roy Blunt
Senate positions
Ranking Member of the Senate Intelligence Committee
In office January 3, 2007 – January 3, 2011
Preceded by	Jay Rockefeller
Succeeded by	Saxby Chambliss
Chair of the Senate Small Business Committee
In office January 20, 2001 – June 6, 2001
Preceded by	John Kerry
Succeeded by	John Kerry
In office January 4, 1995 – January 3, 2001
Preceded by	Dale Bumpers
Succeeded by	John Kerry
Ranking Member of the Senate Small Business Committee
In office June 6, 2001 – January 3, 2003
Preceded by	John Kerry
Succeeded by	John Kerry
In office January 3, 2001 – January 20, 2001
Preceded by	John Kerry
Succeeded by	John Kerry

47th and 49th Governor of Missouri
- In office January 12, 1981 – January 14, 1985
- Lieutenant: Ken Rothman
- Preceded by: Joseph P. Teasdale
- Succeeded by: John Ashcroft
- In office January 8, 1973 – January 10, 1977
- Lieutenant: Bill Phelps
- Preceded by: Warren E. Hearnes
- Succeeded by: Joseph P. Teasdale

28th Auditor of Missouri
- In office January 11, 1971 – January 8, 1973
- Governor: Warren Hearnes
- Preceded by: Haskell Holman
- Succeeded by: John Ashcroft

Personal details
- Born: Christopher Samuel Bond; March 6, 1939 St. Louis, Missouri, U.S.
- Died: May 13, 2025 (aged 86) St. Louis, Missouri, U.S.
- Party: Republican
- Spouses: Carolyn Reid (m. 1967; div. 1994); Linda Pell (m. 2002)
- Children: 1
- Relatives: Arthur D. Bond (father)
- Education: Princeton University (BA); University of Virginia (JD)
- Bond's voice Bond opposing amendments regulating nuclear medicine Recorded June 23, 2005

Christopher Samuel "Kit" Bond (March 6, 1939 – May 13, 2025) was an American attorney and politician from Missouri. A member of the Republican Party, he served as a U.S. senator from 1987 to 2011, following two non-consecutive terms as the governor of Missouri from 1973 to 1977 and 1981 to 1985, and two years as State Auditor of Missouri from 1971 to 1973. His first election as governor ended a 28-year Democratic streak in that office.

Elected to the U.S. Senate in 1986, Bond defeated Democrat Harriett Woods by a margin of 53–47%. He was re-elected in 1992, 1998, and 2004. On January 8, 2009, he announced that he would not seek re-election to a fifth term in 2010, and was succeeded by fellow Republican Roy Blunt on January 3, 2011. Following his retirement from the Senate, Bond became a partner at Thompson Coburn.

== Early life, education, and law career ==
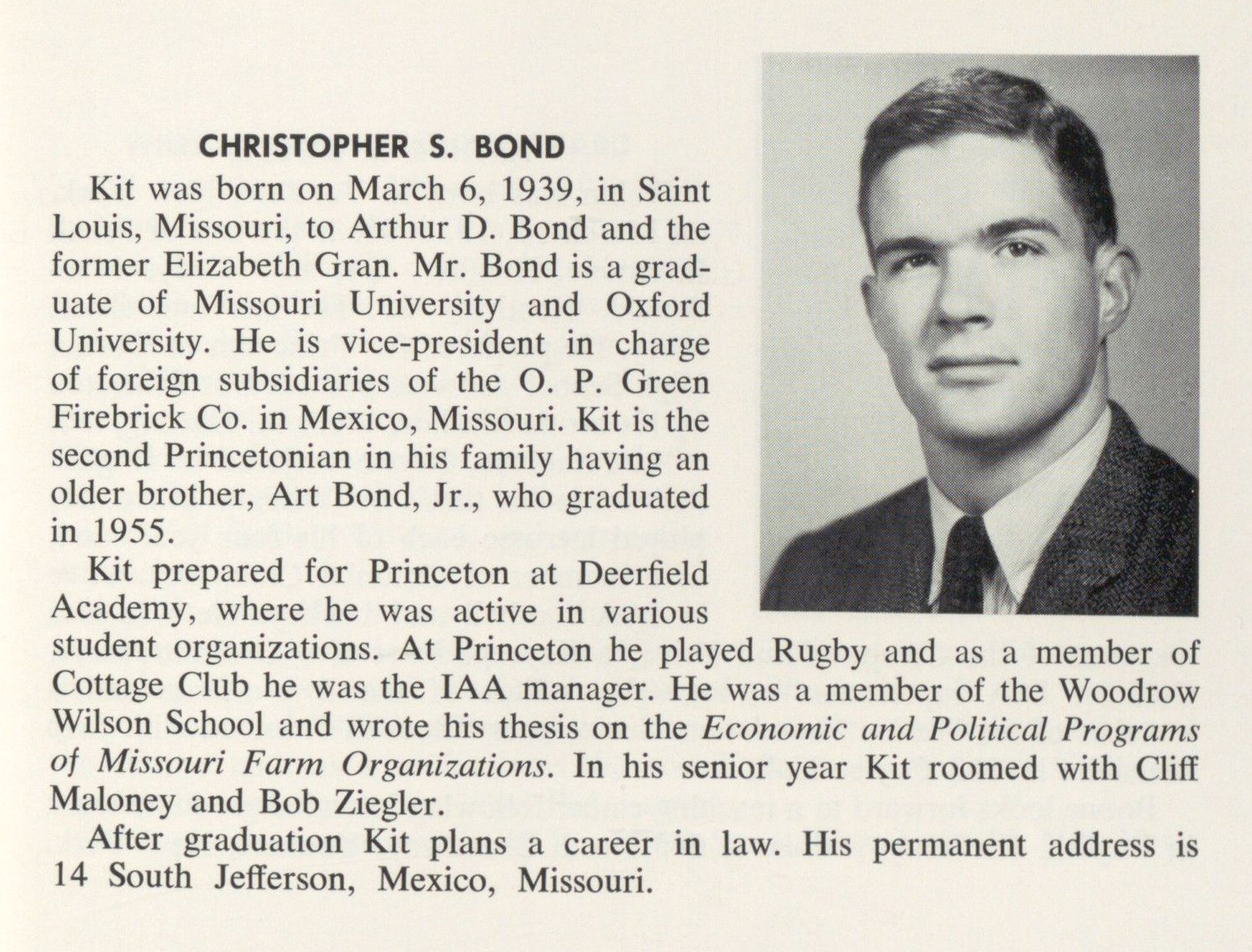
Bond in the Princeton University yearbook, 1960

A sixth-generation Missourian, Bond was born in St. Louis on March 6, 1939, the son of Elizabeth (née Green) and Arthur D. Bond. His father was captain of the 1924 Missouri Tigers football team and a Rhodes Scholar. His maternal grandfather, A.P. Green, founded A.P. Green Industries, a fireclay manufacturer and a major employer for many years in Bond's hometown Mexico, Missouri. He was the benefactor and namesake of A. P. Green Chapel at the University of Missouri.

Bond graduated from Deerfield Academy in 1956 and then attended Princeton University and graduated in 1960 with an A.B. from the Woodrow Wilson School of Public and International Affairs. He completed a 162-page senior thesis that year titled "Missouri Farm Organizations and the Problems of Agriculture". While a student at Princeton, Bond was a member of the Quadrangle Club. He graduated first in his class from the University of Virginia School of Law in 1963 with a J.D.

Bond served as a law clerk (1963–64) to the Honorable Elbert Tuttle, then Chief Judge on the United States Court of Appeals for the Fifth Circuit in Atlanta, Georgia. Bond practiced law (1964–67) at Covington & Burling in Washington, D.C.

== Early political career ==
Bond moved back to his hometown of Mexico, Missouri in the fall of 1967, and ran for Congress in 1968 in Missouri's 9th congressional district, the rural northeastern part of the state. He defeated Anthony Schroeder in the August Republican primary, 56% to 44%, winning 19 of the district's 23 counties.

In the November general election, Bond came close to defeating incumbent Democratic U.S. Congressman Bill Hungate, 48% to 52%. Bond won eight of the district's 23 counties. Out of Hungate's five re-election campaigns, that 1968 election against Bond was his worst performance.

State Attorney General John Danforth hired Bond as an Assistant Attorney General in 1969, where Bond led the office's Consumer Protection Division. In 1970, at the age of 31, Bond was elected Missouri State Auditor, defeating seventeen-year incumbent Haskell Holman. As auditor, Bond hired seven certified public accountants to the office, which increased the total from one.

== Governor of Missouri ==
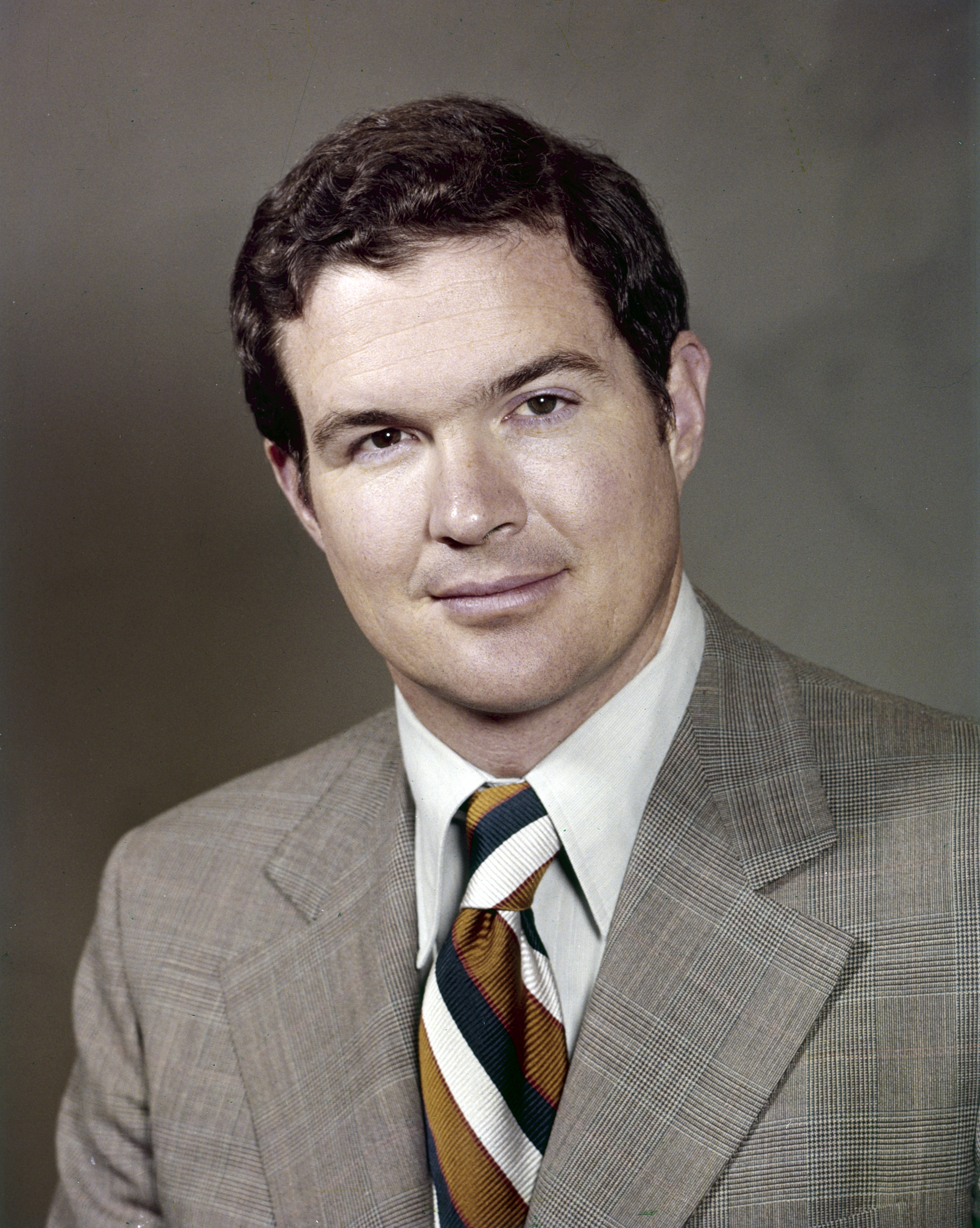
Bond's official photo during his first term as Governor

In 1972, Bond was elected governor of Missouri by a margin of 55% to 45%, making him, at 33 years of age, the youngest governor in the history of Missouri. Bond was the first Republican in 28 years to serve as governor of Missouri.

Bond's residency qualifications to be governor were challenged but were upheld by the Missouri Supreme Court in 1972. Missouri law said the governor had to be a resident for 10 years. In the 10 years before his run, he had attended law school in Virginia, clerked for a federal appeals court judge in Atlanta, worked for a firm in Washington, D.C., applied to take the bar in Virginia and Georgia, registered a car in Washington, D.C., and applied for a marriage license in Kentucky. The Court sided with him, commenting that residence "is largely a matter of intention" and did not require "actual, physical presence". The court ruled a residence was "that place where a man has his true, fixed and permanent home and principal establishment, and to which whenever he is absent he has the intention of returning."

In many ways, Bond governed as a moderate during his first term as governor: for example, he drew criticism from conservatives for his support of the Equal Rights Amendment. On June 25, 1976, he signed an executive order rescinding the Extermination Order against Mormons issued by Governor Lilburn Boggs on October 27, 1838.

During the 1976 United States presidential election, Bond endorsed Gerald Ford over Ronald Reagan in the Republican primaries, a move which drew the ire of some Missouri Republicans. Bond was on the short list to be Ford’s vice-presidential running mate.

In 1976, Bond faced Jackson County Prosecutor Joseph P. Teasdale. Bond appeared the heavy favorite, and at least one poll showed Bond ahead of Teasdale 51 percent to 36 percent. However, Teasdale attacked Bond over utility rates and launched an ad blitz attacking Bond, vastly outspending him in the last few weeks. Teasdale would defeat Bond by a little over 13,000 votes. Bond would later say of his loss: "I didn't answer his negative attacks and instead I tried to talk about the 50 good things we had accomplished. And the voters ... gave me four years to think about it." Afterwards, Bond returned to practicing law, setting up the Great Plains Legal Foundation, a group which fought agriculture regulations.

In 1980, Bond made a successful comeback, defeating fellow Republican and incumbent Lieutenant Governor Bill Phelps in the primary, and Teasdale in November. His second term was plagued by budget issues, with the Missouri commissioner of administration Stephen Bradford telling Bond during the transition period: "Governor, I'm sorry to tell you this, but there's no money." Among Bond's most noted accomplishments was helping take the Parents As Teachers program statewide. Bond served as the Chairman of the Midwestern Governors Association in 1983. In 1984, Bond chose not to seek re-election to a third term as Governor and was succeeded as governor on January 14, 1985, by John Ashcroft, a Republican who Bond had appointed to complete his unexpired term as State Auditor after he was elected governor. Ashcroft later served alongside Bond in the U.S. Senate.

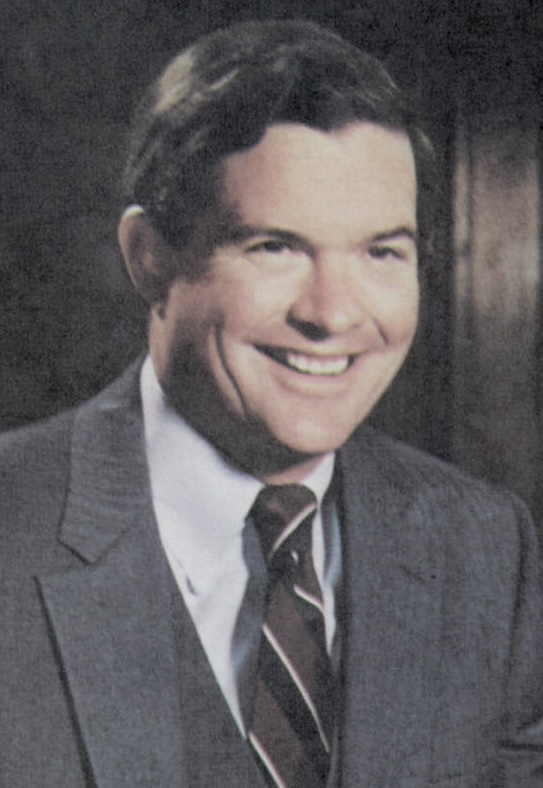
Bond in 1981

== U.S. Senate ==
=== Elections ===
After Senator Thomas Eagleton decided not to run for re-election, Bond was elected senator in 1986, defeating Lieutenant Governor Harriett Woods by 53% to 47%. Bond was re-elected in 1992 defeating St. Louis County Councilwoman Geri Rothman-Serot, ex-wife of former Lieutenant Governor Ken Rothman. In 1998 Bond decisively defeated Attorney General (and future Governor) Jay Nixon and Libertarian Tamara Millay after a hard-fought campaign, and in 2004 he won re-election over Democratic challenger State Treasurer Nancy Farmer with 56 percent of the vote.

Facing the expiration of his fourth full term in January 2011, Bond announced on January 8, 2009, that he did not plan to seek a fifth term and would not run for re-election in November 2010. Representative Roy Blunt held the seat for the Republicans, defeating Democratic Secretary of State Robin Carnahan.

=== Tenure ===
==== Environmental record ====
Bond expressed support for zero-carbon energy from nuclear power in a 2008 Senate floor speech.

==== Taxes ====
Commenting on an IRS spokesman's claim that a person catching a record-breaking home run ball from Mark McGwire could be "responsible for paying any applicable tax on any large gift", which was thought to be close to $140,000 in this circumstance, Bond said: "If the IRS wants to know why they are the most hated federal agency in America, they need look no further than this."

==== Torture ====
Bond opposed setting forth interrogation methods used by the Central Intelligence Agency to conform to the U.S. Army Field Manual. While drawing criticism for being one of only nine senators to oppose such a bill, Bond said on the floor that he does not favor or approve of torture.

In a memo to CIA director John Brennan and others, he suggested banning specific techniques that could be considered torture in order to encourage servicemen to invent others on their own. He did not approve of making interrogation techniques public information on the basis that it would allow enemy combatants to train and prepare themselves for what they might go through if captured. He drew criticism when, during a debate he made a comment comparing waterboarding to swimming, stating "There are different ways of doing it. It's like swimming, freestyle, backstroke", in response to the question "do you think that waterboarding... constitutes torture?"

==== Free trade ====
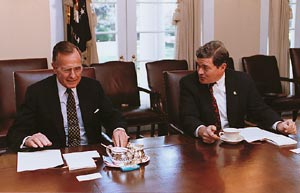
Bond with President George H.W. Bush

Bond was a supporter of expanding free trade to the developing world, and he believed in giving presidential authority to fasttrack trade relations. He voted for the North American Free Trade Agreement (NAFTA) and the Central America Free Trade Agreement (CAFTA) and believed in permanently normalizing trade relations with the People's Republic of China and Vietnam.

==== Government reform ====
While Bond voted in favor in banning members of Congress from receiving gifts from lobbyists, he generally opposed campaign reform. He voted against the McCain-Feingold Act for bipartisan campaign finance solutions. Bond also voted against limiting contributions from corporations or labor.

==== Social issues ====
Bond voted consistently against same-sex marriage, supporting the proposed constitutional ban of it.

On June 25, 1976, Bond officially ordered the recension of Executive Order Number 44 issued by Lilburn W. Boggs in 1838 that ordered the expulsion or extermination of all Mormons from the State of Missouri and issued an apology to Mormons on behalf of all Missourians.

In 1983, as Missouri governor, Bond signed a declaration of recognition in support of the group known as the Northern Cherokee, now called the Northern Cherokee Nation of the Old Louisiana Territory attempting to grant a form of State recognition by way of executive order. This act was part of the group's attempt to gain Federal Recognition and to receive the related benefits for the group.

==== Dismissal of U.S. attorneys controversy ====
In October 2008, Bond apologized to former U.S. Attorney Todd Graves, after a U.S. Justice Department report cited Bond for forcing Graves out over a disagreement with Representative Sam Graves. Following the report, Attorney General Michael Mukasey appointed a special prosecutor to investigate whether former Attorney General Alberto Gonzales and other officials involved in the firings of nine U.S. attorneys broke the law. Citizens for Responsibility and Ethics in Washington (CREW), a progressive activist group, filed an Ethics Committee complaint against Bond over his role in the ouster of Graves.

In 2009, it was revealed according to White House documents that Graves was put on a dismissal list a month after White House e-mail indicated that his replacement was part of a deal between Bond and the Bush administration. The e-mail suggested that Graves was replaced with a candidate favored by Bond to clear the way for an appointment of a federal judge from Arkansas on the 8th Circuit Court of Appeals.

=== Committee assignments ===
- Committee on Appropriations
  - Subcommittee on Agriculture, Rural Development, Food and Drug Administration, and Related Agencies
  - Subcommittee on Defense
  - Subcommittee on Energy and Water Development
  - Subcommittee on Financial Services and General Government
  - Subcommittee on State, Foreign Operations, and Related Programs
  - Subcommittee on Transportation, Housing and Urban Development, and Related Agencies (Ranking Member)
- Committee on Environment and Public Works
  - Subcommittee on Clean Air and Nuclear Safety
  - Subcommittee on Green Jobs and the New Economy (Ranking Member)
  - Subcommittee on Superfund, Toxics and Environmental Health
- Committee on Small Business and Entrepreneurship
- Select Committee on Intelligence (Vice Chairman)

== Post-government career ==
After leaving office in January 2011, Bond joined the law firm of Thompson Coburn.

Bond served as a co-chair of the Housing Commission at the Bipartisan Policy Center.

In August 2011, Bond announced that he would join alliantgroup's strategic advisory board and serve as a senior adviser for the firm.

Bond formally launched his own firm, Kit Bond Strategies, in November 2011.

== Missouri Apollo 17 goodwill Moon rock ==
In the last few days of his long political career, Bond and his staff solved a mystery that had intrigued the press, Missouri politicians, and members of academia for much of 2010. Missouri state officials had wrongly believed that the state museum held a rare and valuable Apollo 17 lunar sample display containing a "goodwill Moon rock". On June 8, 2010, the state realized that what they actually had was only the Missouri Apollo 11 lunar sample display containing small samples of Moon dust rather than the $5 million piece of Apollo 17 history. In cleaning out his senatorial office in December 2010, it was discovered that Bond had inadvertently taken the Apollo 17 display when he had left the governor's office. He subsequently returned the display to the governor of Missouri at the time, Jay Nixon, who passed it on to the Missouri State Museum. Bond was one of four former governors who had taken their states' lunar sample displays upon leaving office; the other three were the former governors of Colorado, West Virginia, and Arkansas.

== Personal life ==
Bond's son Sam graduated in 2003 from Princeton University, after which he became an officer in the United States Marine Corps and served multiple tours of duty in Iraq. Sam later entered a career in business.

In 1994, Bond's wife, Carolyn, filed for a divorce, which was finalized the following year. Bond married Linda Pell, now Linda Bond, in 2002. She grew up in the Kansas City suburb of Gladstone and was a partner of a fundraising firm that supported Republican organizations. She and Bond had dated in the late 1990s, and then dated again a few years later before they were engaged. The marriage was her second marriage as well.

After winning his second term as governor, Bond sued his investment manager and Paine Webber, alleging his $1.3 million trust fund had been drained. He was one of several clients who sued, and he settled in 1996 for $900,000.

In 2009, Bond co-authored a book with Lewis Simons entitled The Next Front: Southeast Asia and the Road to Global Peace with Islam.

Bond had permanent vision loss in one eye, which he attributed to undiagnosed amblyopia during childhood.

Bond died in St. Louis on May 13, 2025, at the age of 86.

== Places named after ==
- Christopher S. Bond Bridge (Hermann, Missouri)
- Christopher S. Bond Bridge, Kansas City
- Christopher S. Bond United States Courthouse, Jefferson City
- Christopher S. Bond Life Sciences Center – University of Missouri (Columbia), Columbia, Missouri
- Christopher S. "Kit" Bond Science and Technology Incubator – Missouri Western State University, St. Joseph, Missouri
- Kit Bond Visitor Center (USACE project office) Stockton, Missouri

== Electoral history ==
After over 40 years in politics, Senator Bond announced on January 8, 2009, that he would not seek re-election in 2010. Results of elections in which he was a candidate are summarized as follows:

=== Governor of Missouri ===
Missouri gubernatorial election, 1972
Party	Candidate	Votes	%	±%
Republican	Kit Bond	1,029,451	55.18	+15.98
Democratic	Edward L. Dowd	832,751	44.64	−16.16
Nonpartisan	Paul J. Leonard	3,481	0.19	+0.19
Majority		196,700	10.54	−11.06
Turnout		1,865,683	39.89	−0.96
Republican gain from Democratic		Swing		

Missouri gubernatorial election, 1976
Party	Candidate	Votes	%	±%
Democratic	Joseph P. Teasdale	971,184	50.23%	+5.59%
Republican	Kit Bond (incumbent)	958,110	49.55%	−5.63%
Nonpartisan	Leon Striler	4,215	0.22%	+0.03%
N/A	write-ins	46	0.00%	±0.00%
Socialist Workers	Helen Savio	20	0.00%	±0.00%
Majority		13,074	0.68%	−9.86%
Turnout		1,933,575	41.34%	+1.45%
Democratic gain from Republican		Swing		

Missouri gubernatorial election, 1980
Party	Candidate	Votes	%	±%
Republican	Kit Bond	1,098,950	52.63%	▲3.08
Democratic	Joseph P. Teasdale (incumbent)	981,884	47.02%	▼3.21
Socialist Workers	Helen Savio	7,193	0.34%	▲0.34
Majority		117,066	5.61	+4.93
Turnout		2,088,027	42.47	+1.13
Republican gain from Democratic		Swing		

=== U.S. Senator ===
United States Senate election in Missouri, 1986
Party	Candidate	Votes	%
Republican	Kit Bond	777,612	52.64%
Democratic	Harriett Woods	699,624	47.36%
Majority		77,988	5.28%
Turnout		1,477,236	
Republican gain from Democratic			

1992 United States Senate election in Missouri
Party	Candidate	Votes	%
Republican	Kit Bond (incumbent)	1,221,901	51.89%
Democratic	Geri Rothman-Serot	1,057,967	44.93%
Libertarian	Jeanne Bojarski	75,048	3.19%
Majority		163,934	6.96%
Turnout		2,354,916	
Republican hold			

1998 United States Senate election in Missouri
Party	Candidate	Votes	%
Republican	Kit Bond (incumbent)	830,625	52.68%
Democratic	Jay Nixon	690,208	43.77%
Libertarian	Tamara Millay	31,876	2.02%
Constitution	Curtis Frazier	15,368	0.98%
Reform	James Newport	8,780	0.56%
Majority		140,417	8.90%
Turnout		1,576,857	
Republican hold			

2004 United States Senate election in Missouri
Party	Candidate	Votes	%	±%
Republican	Kit Bond (Incumbent)	1,518,089	56.09%	+3.42%
Democratic	Nancy Farmer	1,158,261	42.80%	−0.97%
Libertarian	Kevin Tull	19,648	0.73%	−1.30%
Constitution	Don Griffin	10,404	0.38%	
Majority		359,828	13.30%	+4.39%
Turnout		2,706,402		
Republican hold		Swing		

== Footnotes ==
Political offices
Preceded by Haskell Holman	Auditor of Missouri; 1971–1973	Succeeded by John Ashcroft
Preceded by Warren E. Hearnes	Governor of Missouri; 1973–1977	Succeeded by Joseph P. Teasdale
Preceded by Joseph Teasdale	Governor of Missouri; 1981–1985	Succeeded by John Ashcroft
Party political offices
Preceded by William Zimmerman	Republican nominee for State Auditor of Missouri; 1970	Succeeded by John Ashcroft
Preceded by Lawrence K. Roos	Republican nominee for Governor of Missouri; 1972, 1976, 1980	Succeeded by John Ashcroft
Preceded by Winfield Dunn	Chair of the Republican Governors Association; 1974–1975	Succeeded by Arch Moore
Preceded by Gene McNary	Republican nominee for U.S. Senator from Missouri (Class 3); 1986, 1992, 1998, 2004	Succeeded by Roy Blunt
U.S. Senate
Preceded by Thomas Eagleton	United States Senator (Class 3) from Missouri; 1987–2011; Served alongside: John Danforth, John Ashcroft, Jean Carnahan, Jim Talent, Claire McCaskill	Succeeded by Roy Blunt
Preceded by Dale Bumpers	Chair of the Senate Small Business Committee; 1995–2001	Succeeded by John Kerry
Preceded by Jay Rockefeller	Vice Chair of the Senate Intelligence Committee; 2007–2011	Succeeded by Saxby Chambliss
