= 1970 Missouri State Auditor election =

- November 3, 1970
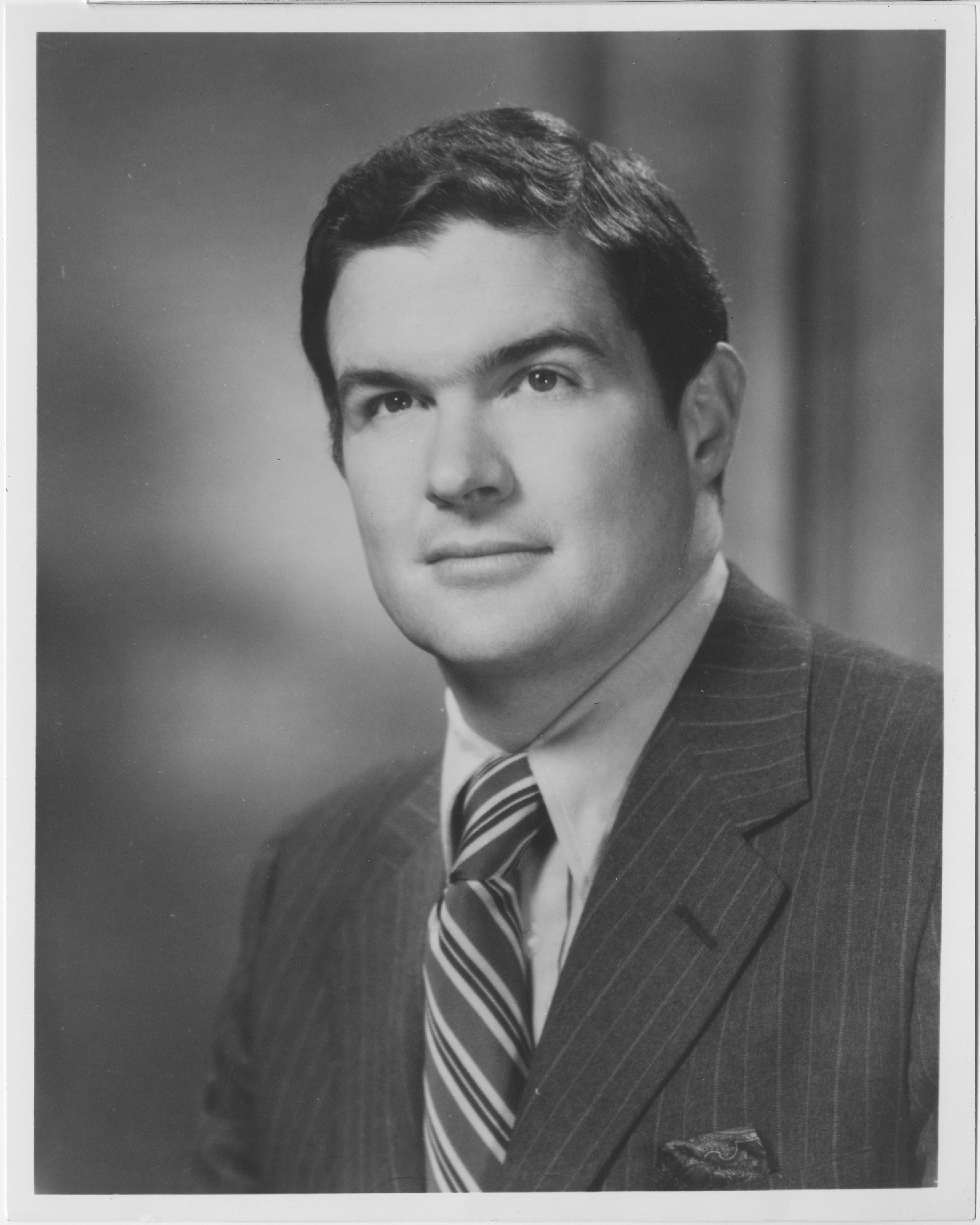

| Nominee | Kit Bond | Haskell Holman |
| Party | Republican | Democratic |
| Popular vote | 727,059 | 524,197 |
| Percentage | 58.11% | 41.89% |
State Auditor before election
Haskell Holman
Democratic
Elected State Auditor
Kit Bond
Republican

The 1970 Missouri State Auditor election was held on November 3, 1970, in order to elect the state auditor of Missouri. Republican nominee Kit Bond defeated Democratic nominee and incumbent state auditor Haskell Holman.

== General election ==
On election day, November 3, 1970, Republican nominee Kit Bond won the election by a margin of 202,862 votes against his opponent Democratic nominee Haskell Holman, thereby gaining Republican control over the office of state auditor. Bond was sworn in as the 28th state auditor of Missouri on January 12, 1971.

=== Results ===
Missouri State Auditor election, 1970
| Party | Candidate | Votes | % |
|---|---|---|---|
| Republican | Kit Bond | 727,059 | 58.11 |
| Democratic | Haskell Holman (incumbent) | 524,197 | 41.89 |
| Total votes | | 1,251,256 | 100.00 |
| Republican gain from Democratic | | | |
