= 2004 United States Senate election in Missouri =

- November 2, 2004
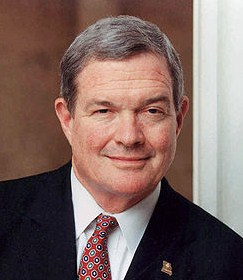

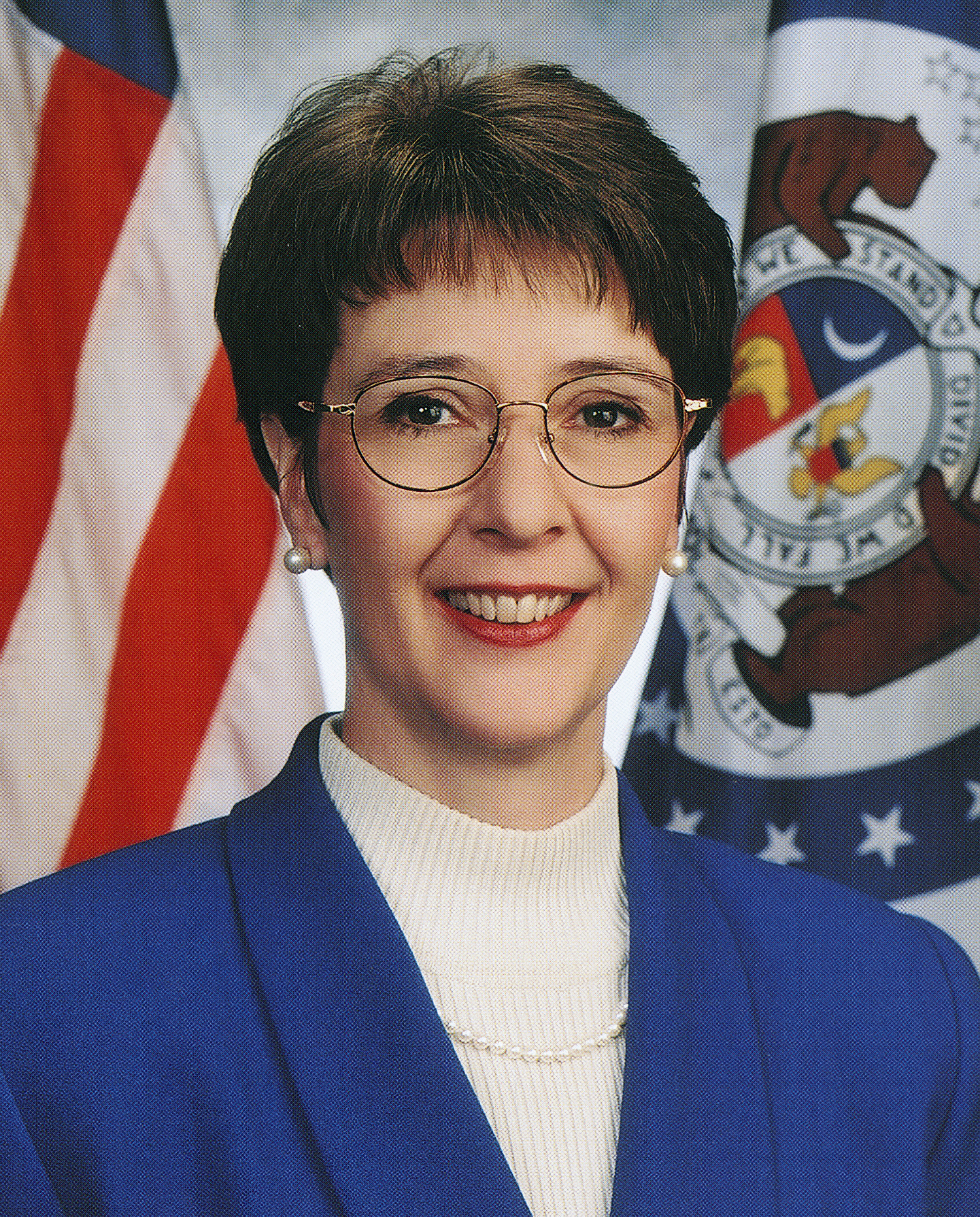
Nominee	Kit Bond	Nancy Farmer
Party	Republican	Democratic
Popular vote	1,518,089	1,158,261
Percentage	56.09%	42.80%
- County results Bond: 50–60% 60–70% 70–80% 80–90% Farmer: 50–60% 70–80%
U.S. senator before election
Kit Bond
Republican
Elected U.S. Senator
Kit Bond
Republican

The 2004 United States Senate election in Missouri was held November 2, 2004. Incumbent Republican U.S. Senator Kit Bond won re-election to a fourth term.

== Democratic primary ==
=== Results ===
- Charles Berry, Vietnam War veteran, teacher
- Ronald Bonar, perennial candidate
- Nancy Farmer, state treasurer of Missouri, former Missouri state representative

=== Results ===
Democratic primary results
Party	Candidate	Votes	%
Democratic	Nancy Farmer	544,830	73.68%
Democratic	Charles Berry	143,229	19.37%
Democratic	Ronald Bonar	51,375	6.95%
Total votes		739,434	100.00%

== Libertarian primary ==
=== Candidates ===
- Kevin Tull, activist

=== Results ===
Libertarian primary results
Party	Candidate	Votes	%
Libertarian	Kevin Tull	3,916	100.00%
Total votes		3,916	100.00%

== Republican primary ==
=== Candidates ===
- Kit Bond, incumbent U.S. senator since 1987
- Mike Steger

=== Results ===
Republican primary results
Party	Candidate	Votes	%
Republican	Kit Bond (Incumbent)	541,998	88.08%
Republican	Mike Steger	73,354	11.92%
Total votes		615,352	100.00%

== General election ==
=== Candidates ===
- Kit Bond (R), incumbent U.S. senator
- Nancy Farmer (D), state treasurer of Missouri and former state representative
- Don Griffin (C)
- Kevin Tull (L), activist

=== Predictions ===
Source	Ranking	As of
Sabato's Crystal Ball	Safe R	November 1, 2004

=== Polling ===
Poll source	Date(s) administered	Sample size (Note: Key: A – all adults RV – registered voters LV – likely voters V – unclear)	Margin of error	Kit Bond (R)	Nancy Farmer (D)	Other / Undecided
SurveyUSA	October 29–31, 2004	690 (LV)	± 3.8%	57%	38%	5%

=== Results ===
General election results
Party	Candidate	Votes	%	±%
Republican	Kit Bond (Incumbent)	1,518,089	56.09%	+3.42%
Democratic	Nancy Farmer	1,158,261	42.80%	−0.97%
Libertarian	Kevin Tull	19,648	0.73%	−1.30%
Constitution	Don Griffin	10,404	0.38%	
Majority		359,828	13.30%	+4.39%
Turnout		2,706,402		
Republican hold		Swing		

==== Counties that flipped from Democratic to Republican ====
- Jefferson (largest city: Arnold)
- New Madrid (largest city: New Madrid)
- Pemiscot (largest city: Caruthersville)
- Iron (largest city: Ironton)
- Washington (largest city: Potosi)
- Sainte Genevieve (largest city: Ste. Genevieve)
- Pike (largest city: Bowling Green)
- Ralls (largest city: Hannibal)
- Lewis (largest city: Canton)
- Reynolds (largest city: Ellington)
- St. Francois (largest city: Farmington)
- Clark (largest city: Kahoka)

==== Counties that flipped from Republican to Democratic ====
- Jackson (largest city: Kansas City)
- St. Louis (largest city: Florissant)

== See also ==
- 2004 United States Senate elections
