= 1986 United States Senate election in Missouri =

- November 4, 1986
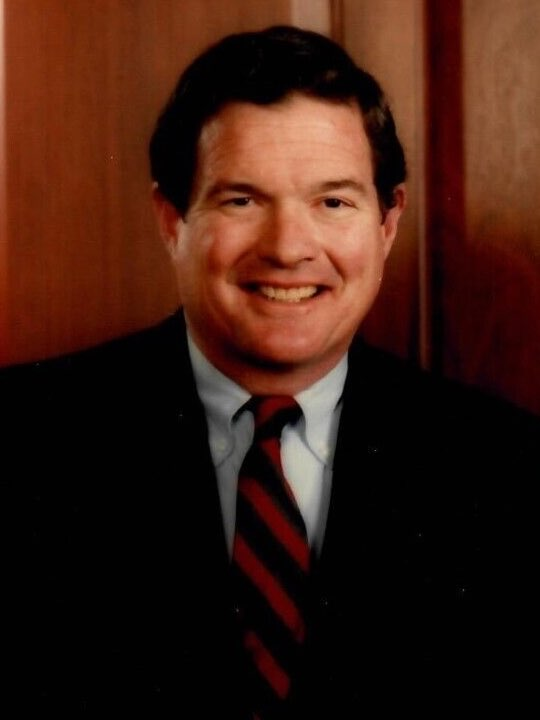

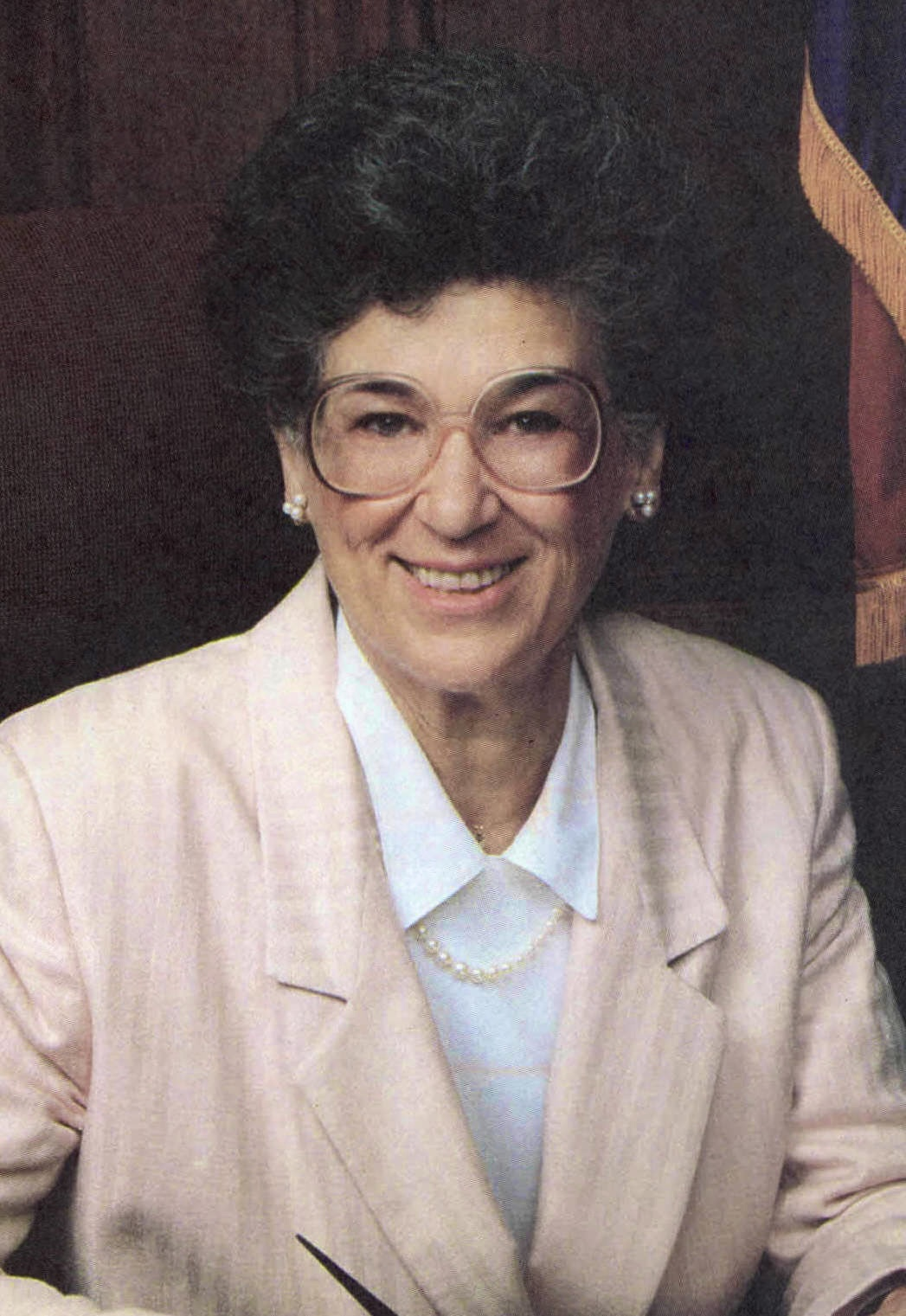
Nominee	Kit Bond	Harriett Woods
Party	Republican	Democratic
Popular vote	777,612	699,624
Percentage	52.64%	47.36%
- County results Bond: 50–60% 60–70% 70–80% Woods: 50–60% 60–70%
U.S. senator before election
Thomas Eagleton
Democratic
Elected U.S. Senator
Kit Bond
Republican

The 1986 United States Senate election in Missouri was held on November 4, 1986. Incumbent Democratic Senator Thomas Eagleton decided to retire instead of seeking a fourth term. Republican former Governor Kit Bond won the open seat. Bond was the first Republican to win the Class 3 Senate seat in Missouri since 1944, and the first Republican to get over 50% of the vote for this seat since 1920. This was the only seat that Republicans flipped in 1986.

== Major candidates ==
=== Democratic ===
- Harriett Woods, Lieutenant Governor

=== Republican ===
- Kit Bond, former Governor

== Results ==
United States Senate election in Missouri, 1986
Party	Candidate	Votes	%
Republican	Kit Bond	777,612	52.64%
Democratic	Harriett Woods	699,624	47.36%
Majority		77,988	5.28%
Turnout		1,477,236	
Republican gain from Democratic			

== See also ==
- 1986 United States Senate elections
