= 1992 United States Senate election in Missouri =

- November 3, 1992
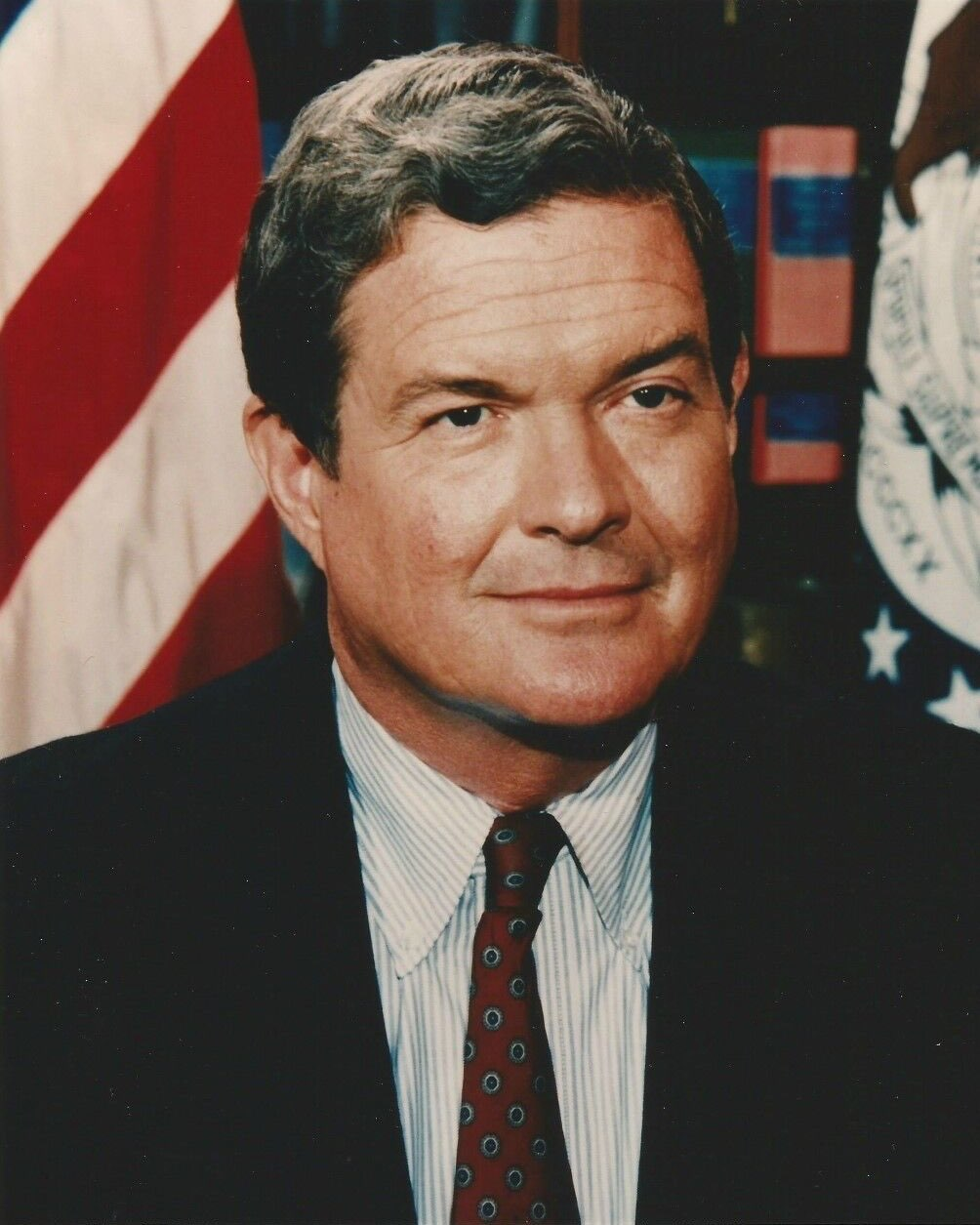

Nominee	Kit Bond	Geri Rothman-Serot
Party	Republican	Democratic
Popular vote	1,221,901	1,057,967
Percentage	51.89%	44.93%
- County results Bond: 40–50% 50–60% 60–70% 70–80% Rothman-Serot: 40–50% 50–60% 60–70%
U.S. senator before election
Kit Bond
Republican
Elected U.S. Senator
Kit Bond
Republican

The 1992 United States Senate election in Missouri was held on November 3, 1992. Incumbent Republican U.S. Senator Kit Bond won re-election to a second term.

== Major candidates ==
=== Democratic ===
- Geri Rothman-Serot, St. Louis County Councilwoman and former Second Lady of Missouri

=== Republican ===
- Kit Bond, incumbent U.S. Senator since 1987

== Results ==
1992 United States Senate election in Missouri
Party	Candidate	Votes	%
Republican	Kit Bond (incumbent)	1,221,901	51.89%
Democratic	Geri Rothman-Serot	1,057,967	44.93%
Libertarian	Jeanne Bojarski	75,048	3.19%
Majority		163,934	6.96%
Turnout		2,354,916	
Republican hold			

== See also ==
- 1992 United States Senate elections
