= Arthur D. Bond =

American football player and businessman

Profile
- Position: Halfback

Personal information
- Born: March 4, 1902; Perryville, Missouri, U.S.
- Died: June 1983 (aged 81)

Career information
- High school: Perryville (MO)
- College: Missouri (1922–1924)

Awards and highlights
- Honorable mention All-American (1924); 2× All-MVC; MVC champion (1924); Rhodes Scholar (1925)

Arthur Doerr Bond was an All-American football player for the University of Missouri Tigers, a Rhodes Scholar, and vice president of the A.P. Green Companies.

== Early life ==
Bond was born in Perryville, Missouri, on March 4, 1902, to Samuel and Ida Doerr Bond. He attended Perryville High School, where he was captain of the football team in 1918 and 1919, as well as participating on the Tuba staff, in the History Club and as a member of the track team.

== Education and athletic career ==
Bond attended the University of Missouri, where he received his bachelor's degree in 1925. Bond continued his athletic exploits at Missouri. He was a member of the 1922-1924 football teams, and was a teammate of future Tiger coach Don Faurot. As captain of the Missouri Tigers in 1924, he led the squad to the Missouri Valley Conference championship. He also lettered in track as a hurdler and sprinter. For two years, he was named to the Missouri Valley Conference all-conference team as a halfback, and was also an honorable mention All-American. For his outstanding scholastic and athletic achievements, he was selected as a Rhodes Scholar. In 1928 he graduated from Oxford University, Oxford, England, with a degree in jurisprudence. He also attended the University of Illinois for one year.

Bond was a member of the Phi Delta Theta social fraternity, Phi Beta Kappa honorary, and Blue Key, an honorary University of Missouri service organization.

== Later career and personal life ==
He was married in 1930 to Elizabeth Carlyle Green of Mexico, Missouri. Her father, A.P. Green, founded A.P. Green Refractories Company, a fireclay manufacturer and a major employer for many years in Mexico. From 1928 to 1967, Bond was associated with the A.P. Green Company, starting in the sales department and working his way up. From 1937 to 1942, he was in the export department. He became a vice-president of the company in 1939, and after 1942 was director of foreign sales. In 1945 he was elevated to director of foreign subsidiaries and after 1947, Bond directed the international division of the A.P. Green Company. He had been a member of the Green Company Board of Directors since 1932.

Bond was appointed by Missouri Governor Forrest Smith in 1949 to the State Board of Training Schools. He served three terms in the 1940s as a member and president of the Missouri Association of Fairs and Agricultural Expositions. He was a colonel on the staff of Governor Forrest C. Donnell, and was a member of the World Trade Advisory Commission and the International Relations Committee of the National Association of Manufacturers. He was an active member of the Missouri Bar Association, and of the Missouri Alumni Association.

He had two children, United States Senator Kit Bond and Arthur D. Bond, Jr. Bond died in June 1983, at the age of 81.
