= 2000 Missouri State Treasurer election =

- November 7, 2000
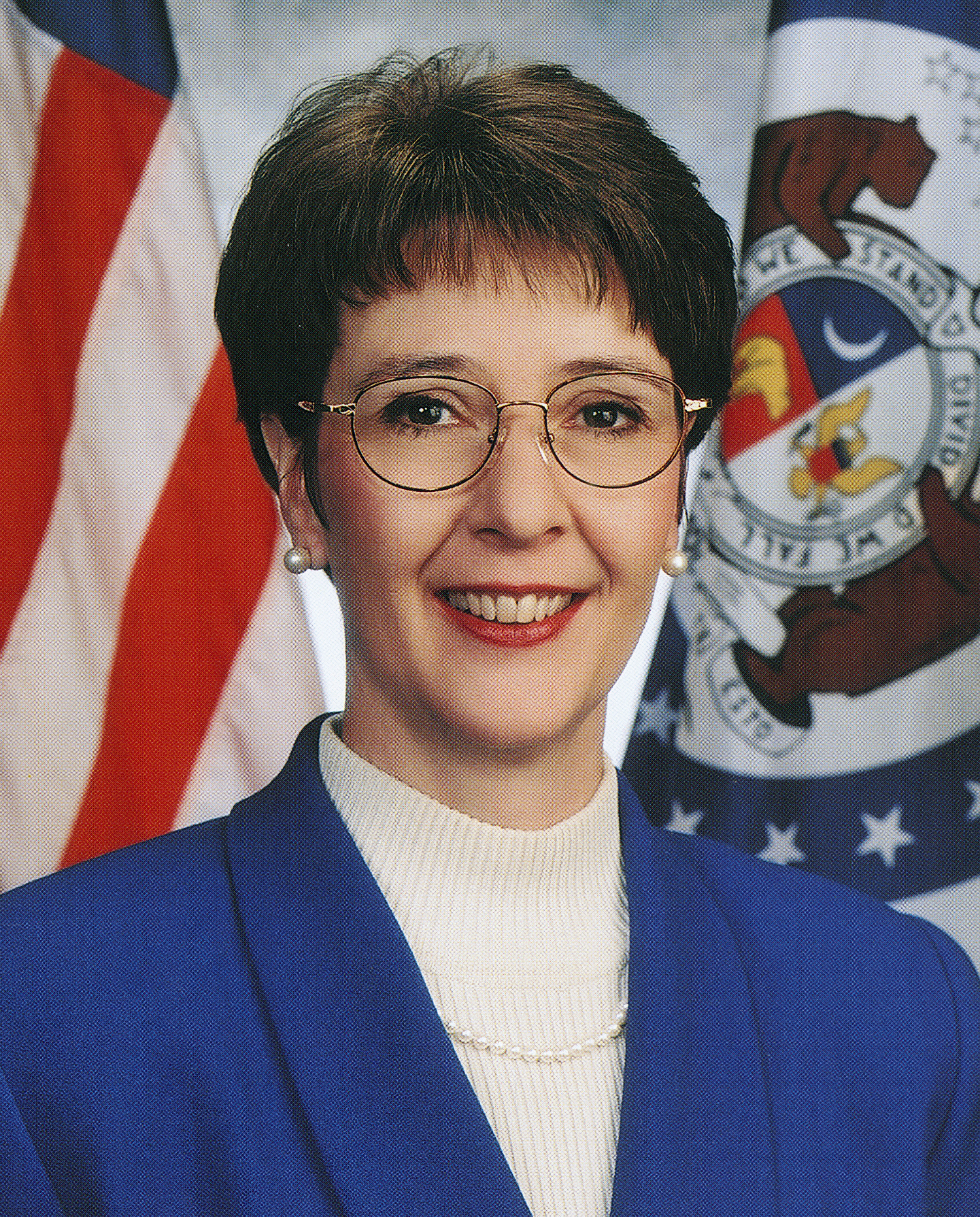

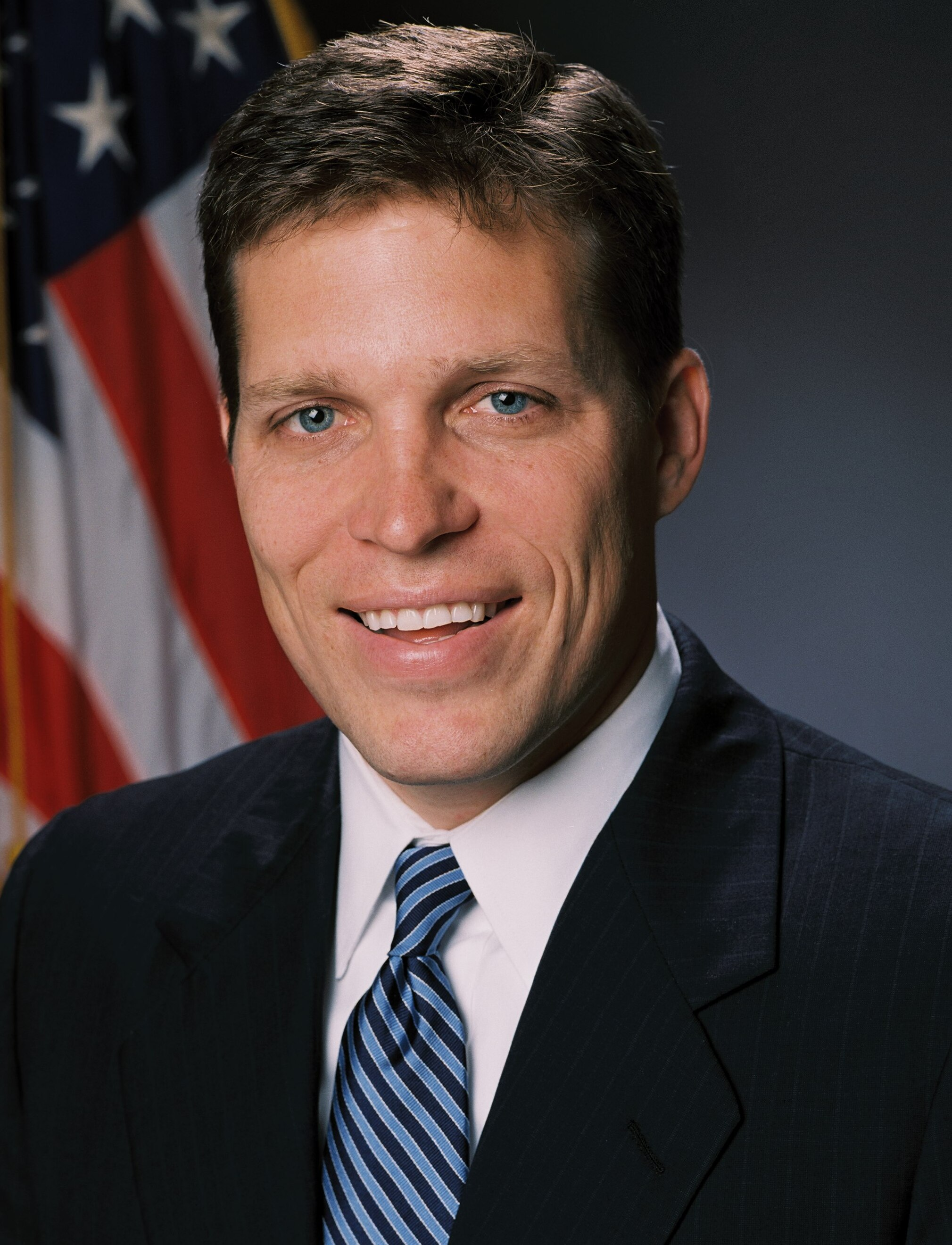
| Nominee | Nancy Farmer | Todd Graves |
| Party | Democratic | Republican |
| Popular vote | 1,186,627 | 1,057,462 |
| Percentage | 51.51% | 45.91% |
- County results Farmer: 40–50% 50–60% 60–70% 70–80% Graves: 40–50% 50–60% 60–70% 70–80% Tie: 40–50%
State Treasurer before election
Bob Holden
Democratic
Elected State Treasurer
Nancy Farmer
Democratic

The 2000 Missouri State Treasurer election was held on November 7, 2000, in order to elect the state treasurer of Missouri. Democratic nominee and former member of the Missouri House of Representatives Nancy Farmer defeated Republican nominee Todd Graves, Libertarian nominee Arnold J. Trembley, Green nominee Ray Vanlandingham, Reform nominee Terrence D. Frank, Constitution nominee Kerry Culligan and Natural Law nominee Marvin Carter. Thereby becoming the first woman to be elected state treasurer of Missouri.

== General election ==
On election day, November 7, 2000, Democratic nominee Nancy Farmer won the election by a margin of 129,165 votes against her foremost opponent Republican nominee Todd Graves, thereby retaining Democratic control over the office of state treasurer. Farmer was sworn in as the 43rd state treasurer of Missouri on January 3, 2001.

=== Results ===
Missouri State Treasurer election, 2000
| Party | Candidate | Votes | % |
|---|---|---|---|
| Democratic | Nancy Farmer | 1,186,627 | 51.51 |
| Republican | Todd Graves | 1,057,462 | 45.91 |
| Libertarian | Arnold J. Trembley | 19,064 | 0.83 |
| Green | Ray Vanlandingham | 18,501 | 0.80 |
| Reform | Terrence D. Frank | 8,307 | 0.36 |
| Constitution | Kerry Culligan | 7,825 | 0.34 |
| Natural Law | Marvin Carter | 5,705 | 0.25 |
| Total votes | | 2,303,491 | 100.00 |
| Democratic hold | | | |

== See also ==
- 2000 Missouri gubernatorial election
