= Nancy Farmer (politician) =

American politician (born 1956)

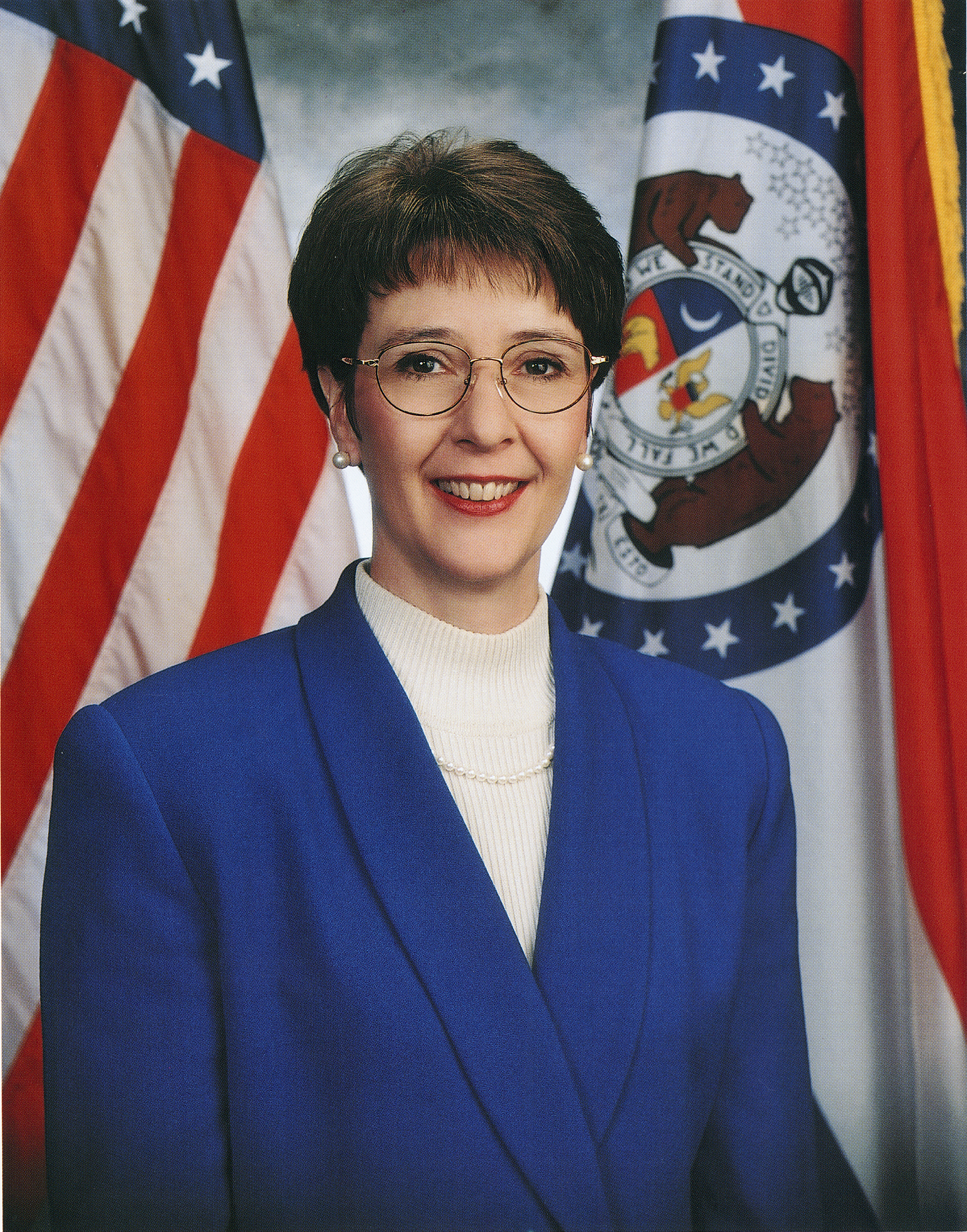
- Official portrait, 2001

Treasurer of Missouri
- In office January 8, 2001 – January 10, 2005
- Governor: Bob Holden
- Preceded by: Bob Holden
- Succeeded by: Sarah Steelman

Member of the Missouri House of Representatives from the 64th district
- In office January 1993 – January 1997
- Preceded by: Tom Stoff
- Succeeded by: Bob Hilgemann

Personal details
- Born: September 11, 1956 (age 69) Jacksonville, Illinois, U.S.
- Party: Democratic
- Education: Illinois College (BA)

Nancy Farmer (born September 11, 1956) was the 43rd State Treasurer of Missouri, serving from 2001 to 2005.

Farmer was raised in Jacksonville, Illinois and graduated from Illinois College there in 1979.

She later moved to Missouri, where she joined the Democratic Party. She was elected to the Missouri House of Representatives, serving from 1993 to 1997. During her tenure in the state legislature, she served as chairwoman of the powerful Ways and Means Committee.

Appointed in 1997 as Assistant Treasurer under State Treasurer Bob Holden, Farmer was elected as State Treasurer of Missouri herself in November 2000. She was the first woman to hold both posts.

In 2004 she was unsuccessful in the 2004 United States Senate election in Missouri, running against incumbent Republican Kit Bond.

Missouri House of Representatives
Preceded by Tom Stoff	Member of the Missouri House of Representatives from the 64th district 1993–1997	Succeeded by Bob Hilgemann
Political offices
Preceded by Bob Holden	Treasurer of Missouri; 2001–2005	Succeeded by Sarah Steelman
Party political offices
Preceded by Bob Holden	Democratic nominee for State Treasurer of Missouri; 2000	Succeeded by Mark Powell
Preceded by Jay Nixon	Democratic nominee for U.S. Senator from Missouri (Class 3); 2004	Succeeded by Robin Carnahan
