= Missouri lunar sample displays =

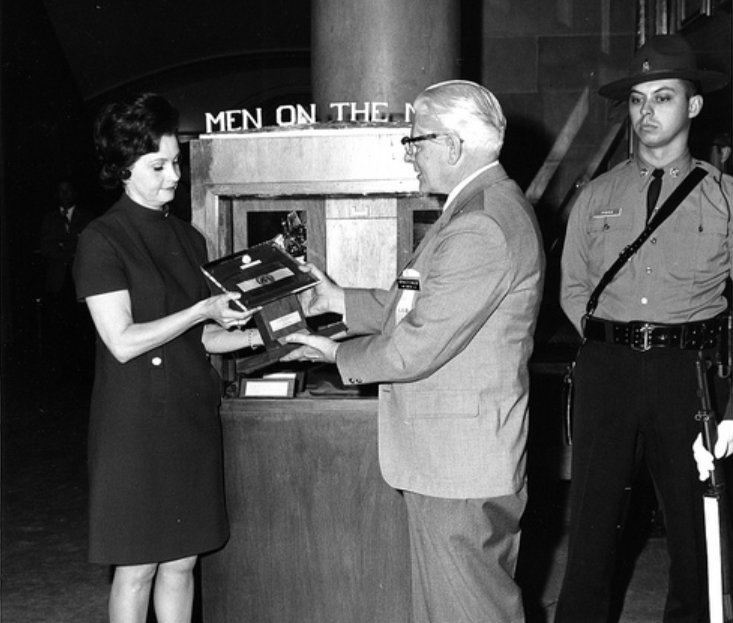
Apollo 11 display gifting, March 17, 1970

The Missouri lunar sample displays are two commemorative plaques consisting of small fragments of Moon specimen brought back with the Apollo 11 and Apollo 17 lunar missions and given in the 1970s to the people of the state of Missouri by United States President Richard Nixon as goodwill gifts.

== Description ==
=== Apollo 11 ===
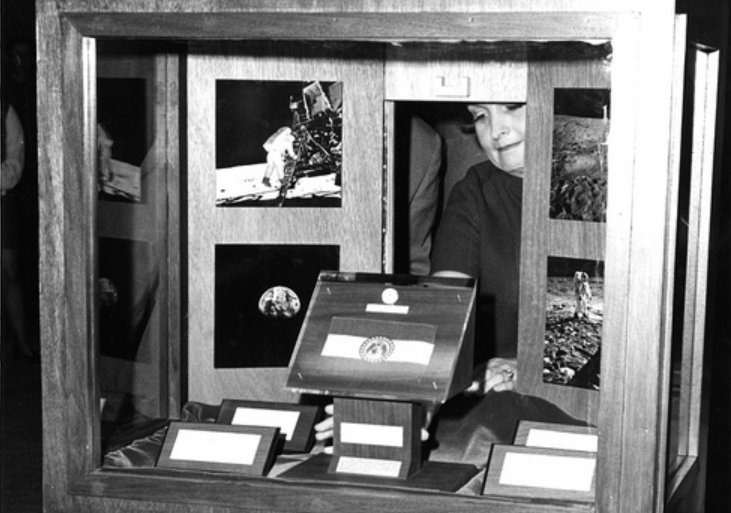
Placing Apollo 11 plaque into case

At the request of Nixon, NASA had about 250 presentation plaques made following Apollo 11 in 1969. Each included about four rice-sized particles of Moon dust from the mission totaling about 50 mg. The Apollo 11 lunar sample display has an acrylic plastic button containing the Moon dust mounted with the recipient's country or state flag that had been to the Moon and back. All 135 countries received the display, as did the 50 states of the United States and the U.S. provinces and the United Nations.

The plaques were given as gifts by Nixon in 1970.

=== Apollo 17 ===
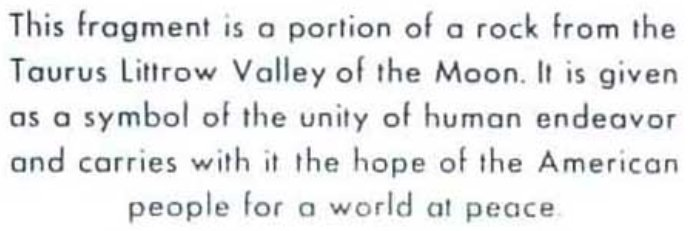
Message on Apollo 17 plaque

The sample Moon rock collected during the Apollo 17 mission was later named lunar basalt 70017, and dubbed the Goodwill rock. Pieces of the rock weighing about 1.14 grams were placed inside a piece of acrylic lucite, and mounted, along with a flag of the country which would receive it, that had flown on Apollo 17.

In 1973 Nixon had the plaques sent to 135 countries, and to the United States with its territories, as a goodwill gesture.

== History ==
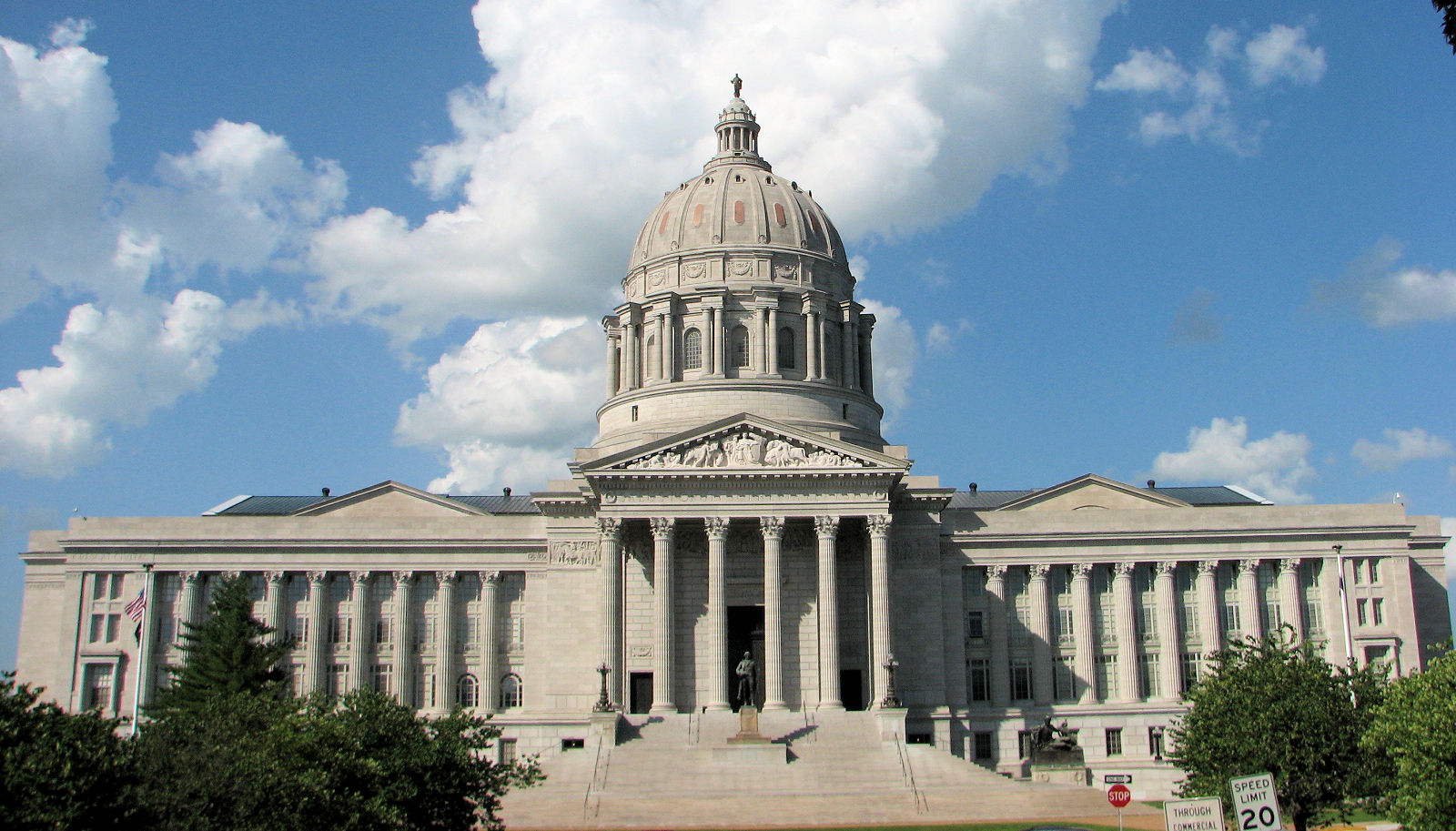
Missouri State Capitol

In May 2010, The Record of Hackensack, a newspaper in northern New Jersey, reported that Missouri's "goodwill Moon rock" was lost and its location was unknown. The Missouri State Museum claimed its "goodwill Moon rock" was at the Missouri State Capitol. The newspaper's pictures of the "goodwill Moon rock" were shown to Joseph Gutheinz, a former special agent with NASA's Office of Inspector General and a self-appointed investigator on the Apollo lunar sample displays. When he saw the pictures, he said they were pictures of the Apollo 11 Moon rocks. A spokesman for the museum said it had no records of the Apollo 17 display.

The Apollo 17 display was later found in Bond's office and given to Governor Jay Nixon, who gave it to the Missouri State Museum, where it is displayed with the Apollo 11 "goodwill Moon rocks".

== See also ==
- List of Apollo lunar sample displays
