= Leroy Tyus =

American politician, real estate developer (1916–1998)

Member of the Missouri General Assembly from the 63rd district
- In office 1950–1961

Personal details
- Born: February 4, 1916 Brownsville, Tennessee, U.S.
- Died: October 15, 1998 (aged 82) St. Louis, Missouri, U.S.
- Resting place: Calvary Cemetery and Mausoleum, St. Louis, Missouri, U.S.
- Education: Lane College, Lincoln University
- Occupation: Politician, real estate developer

Eddie Leroy Tyus (1916–1998) also known as LeRoy Tyus, was an American politician, real estate developer, and state legislator in Missouri. Tyus represented St. Louis as a democrat in the Missouri House of Representatives from 1950 to 1961. Also known as E. Leroy Tyus.

== Biography ==
Leroy Tyus was born in Brownsville, Tennessee. He attended Lane College, and Lincoln University law school. He was a member of Alpha Phi Alpha fraternity.

Tyus represented St. Louis (in the 63rd District, and 20th Ward) as a democrat in the Missouri House of Representatives for five terms, from 1950 to 1961. He pushed for desegregation, and while in office he unsuccessfully pushed for a bill that would desegregate the schools. He was a Democratic Committee member in the 20th Ward for 23 years. He retired from politics in 1983.

In 1984, Tyus was one of six people indicted in a cable television case, they were charged with conspiracy and attempted extortion. The others involved in the legal case included Sorkis Webbe Jr., an alderman in the 7th Ward; Sorkis Webbe Sr., a powerful St. Louis politician; Thomas E. Zych, politician and president of the St. Louis Board of Aldermen; James D. Cullen, Jr. a lawyer; and Eugene P. Slay, a businessman. The courts convicted the six people, but it was later appealed and the case was overturned and Zych was acquitted.

He died from complications of a heart attack on October 15, 1998, at the Vencor Hospital in St. Louis. His the namesake of Tyus Court in St. Louis.
