= David R. Countie =

American politician (1938–2012)

Member of the U.S. House of Representatives from Missouri's 90th district
- Incumbent
- Assumed office 1975

Missouri House of Representatives

Personal details
- Born: 1938 St. Louis, Missouri, US
- Died: 2012 (aged 73–74)
- Resting place: body donated to science
- Party: Republican
- Children: 3 sons
- Occupation: real estate broker

David Robert Countie (February 6, 1938 – June 22, 2012) was an American Republican politician who served in the Missouri House of Representatives. He was born in St. Louis, Missouri, and was educated at St. Louis public schools, the Missouri Military Academy, and St. Louis University. His body was donated to St. Louis University.
