= Harriett Woods =

American politician and activist (1927–2007)

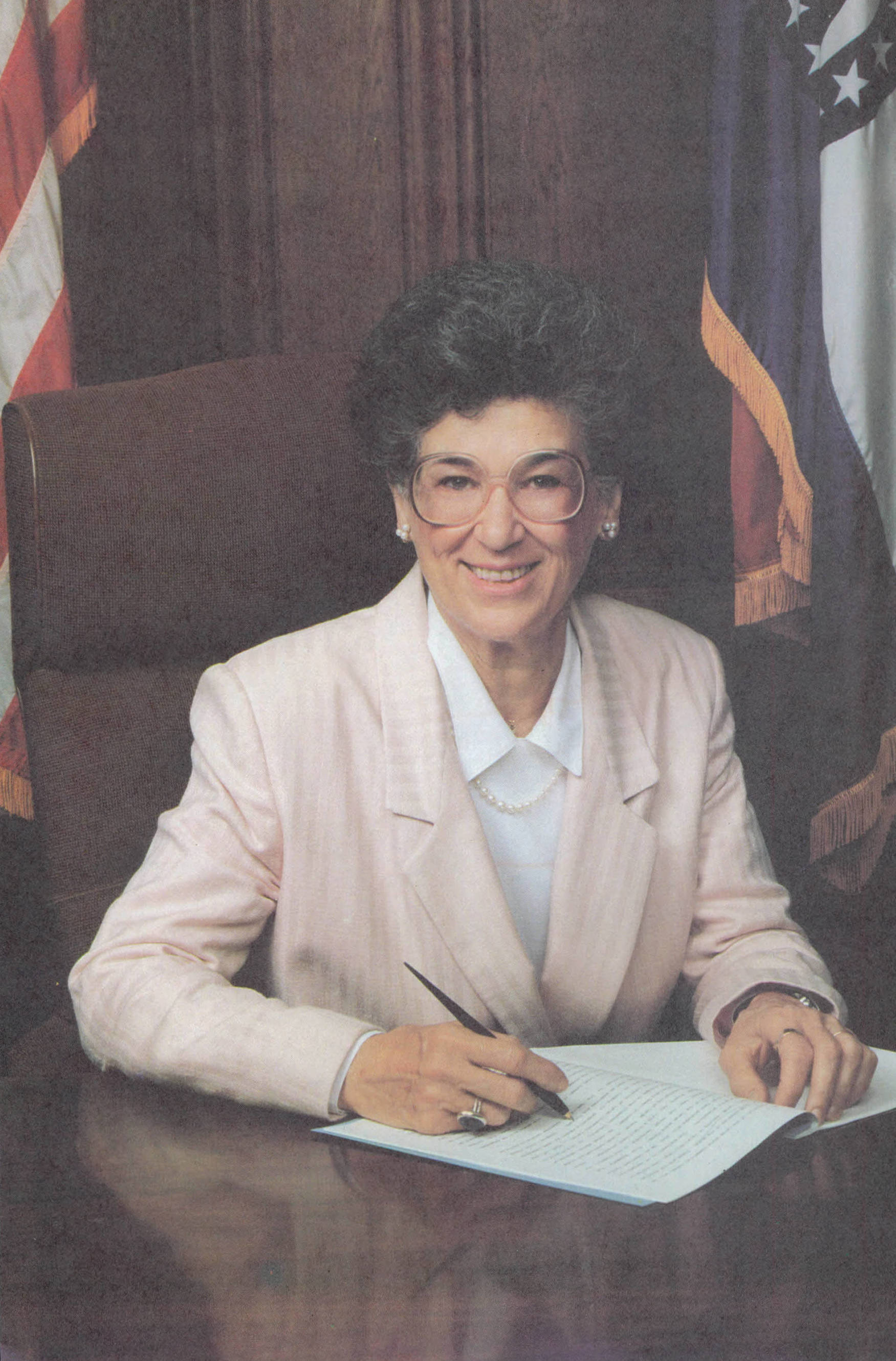
- Woods in 1985

42nd Lieutenant Governor of Missouri
- In office January 14, 1985 – January 9, 1989
- Governor: John Ashcroft
- Preceded by: Ken Rothman
- Succeeded by: Mel Carnahan

Member of the Missouri Senate from the 13th district
- In office January 5, 1977 – January 9, 1985
- Preceded by: Maurice Schechter
- Succeeded by: P. Wayne Goode

Personal details
- Born: Ruth Harriett Friedman; June 2, 1927 Cleveland, Ohio, U.S.
- Died: February 8, 2007 (aged 79) University City, Missouri, U.S.
- Party: Democratic
- Education: University of Michigan (BA)

Ruth Harriett Woods (June 2, 1927 – February 8, 2007) was an American politician and activist, two-time Democratic nominee for the United States Senate from Missouri, and the 42nd lieutenant governor of Missouri. She was the first woman elected to statewide office when she was elected Missouri's first, and so far only, woman lieutenant governor.

== Early life and career ==
Born Ruth Harriett Friedman in Cleveland, Ohio, she received her Bachelor of Arts in philosophy from the University of Michigan, where she was the first woman to serve as Senior Editor of The Michigan Daily during peacetime.

She married Jim Woods on January 2, 1953, and had three sons. Beginning in the early 1960s, Woods began working as a writer, moderator, producer, and talk show host on local television stations. Her programs covered serious topics such as child abuse, women's issues, civil rights, and the Vietnam War.

== Political career ==
Woods's political career began as a member of the University City Council in 1967, where she served for seven years, before being appointed to the Missouri Highway Commission in 1974 by then-Governor Kit Bond.

Woods was first elected to the Missouri State Senate in 1976, becoming the second woman ever elected, and she was reelected in 1980.

=== 1982 United States Senate election ===
In 1982, she made a strong bid for the U.S. Senate against incumbent Republican John Danforth, a colleague of Woods's cousin, Howard Metzenbaum. Aided by a strong grassroots base that rallied under the slogan "Give them hell, Harriett!" (a play on a similar slogan used by supporters of another Missourian, Harry S. Truman), Woods built a political presence in the state. Danforth defeated Woods by 26,000 votes, a margin of less than two percent, the closest election of 1982. Some have argued that the decisive issue in the campaign was Woods's strong support for abortion rights in a state where many rural voters, and the large Catholic population in the St. Louis area, generally opposed abortion.

In the 1982 election, Woods carried Missouri's rural areas, including every county in the southeast. She also carried the state's "Little Dixie" area, a part of mid-Missouri traditionally linked to southern, more conservative, political views, along with the heavily Democratic Kansas City area. But she had problems in some traditionally Democratic areas, losing St. Louis County to Danforth despite living and working as a television producer and newspaper reporter in University City, a suburb of St. Louis. Danforth was also from the St. Louis area. Using her skills as a journalist and former television producer and personality, Woods was able to communicate her message effectively on TV. After trailing Danforth in some polls by more than 50 points after the primary, by mid-October she was running dead even in the polls with him. Her narrow loss, by 26,000 votes, was the closest of 1982.

Another important reason for Woods's narrow loss was that she was outspent ($1,849,025 for Danforth to $1,193,966 for Woods), with almost half of her spending in the last few weeks of the campaign, too late to allow for the purchase of substantial media. As a result, she ran out of money during the latter stages of the campaign, forcing her to pull her very effective TV ads for a week. Nationwide, publicity over the narrow loss of a candidate who with a little more money might have been the first woman ever elected a U.S. Senator from Missouri led to the 1985 creation of the political action committee EMILY's List ("Early Money is Like Yeast").

=== Later career ===
In 1984, Woods ran for lieutenant governor and won, even as voters elected Republican John Ashcroft governor and Ronald Reagan carried Missouri and 48 other states. Woods thus became the first woman elected to statewide office in Missouri.

In 1986, she once again was chosen as the Democratic nominee for the Senate, this time running against former Governor Kit Bond for the seat being vacated by retiring Senator Tom Eagleton. In another tight race, Woods lost by three points. She remained lieutenant governor until 1989.

== Later life ==
After her retirement, Woods remained prominent, especially as an activist for women in politics. From 1991 to 1995, she was president of the National Women's Political Caucus. In 1999, she was inducted into the St. Louis Walk of Fame. She also taught classes on gender and politics at the University of Missouri–St. Louis, Pace University, and Hunter College. In January 2001, Woods joined other Missouri Democrats in opposing John Ashcroft's nomination for U.S. Attorney General.

== See also ==
- List of female lieutenant governors in the United States

Party political offices
Preceded by Warren Hearnes	Democratic nominee for U.S. Senator from Missouri (Class 1); 1982	Succeeded by Jay Nixon
Preceded by Ken Rothman	Democratic nominee for Lieutenant Governor of Missouri; 1984	Succeeded by Mel Carnahan
Preceded by Bill Clinton; Bob Graham; Tip O'Neill	Response to the State of the Union address 1986; Served alongside: Tom Daschle, Bill Gray, George Mitchell, Chuck Robb	Succeeded by Robert Byrd; Jim Wright
Preceded by Thomas Eagleton	Democratic nominee for U.S. Senator from Missouri (Class 3); 1986	Succeeded by Geri Rothman-Serot
Political offices
Preceded by Ken Rothman	Lieutenant Governor of Missouri; 1985–1989	Succeeded by Mel Carnahan
