= 1972 Missouri gubernatorial election =

- November 7, 1972
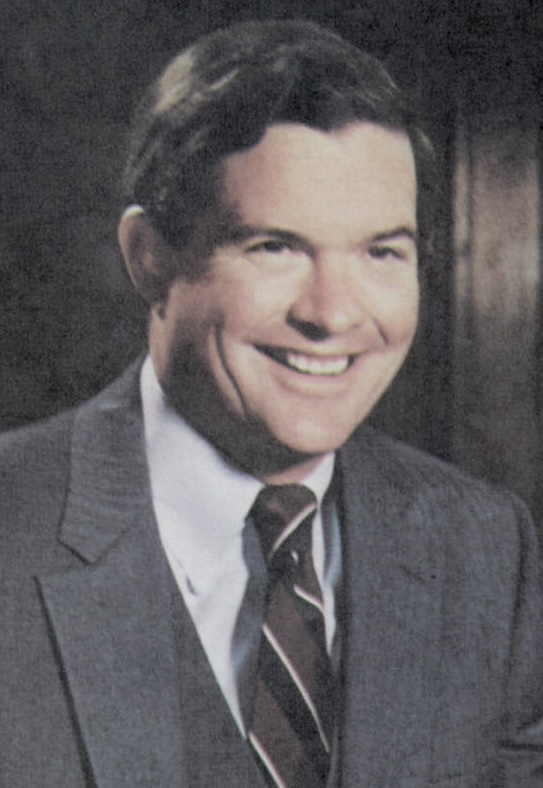

Nominee	Kit Bond	Edward L. Dowd
Party	Republican	Democratic
Popular vote	1,029,451	832,751
Percentage	55.18%	44.64%
- County results Bond: 50–60% 60–70% 70–80% Dowd: 50–60% 60–70%
Governor before election
Warren E. Hearnes
Democratic
Elected Governor
Kit Bond
Republican

The 1972 Missouri gubernatorial election was held on November 7, 1972, in the U.S. state of Missouri, and resulted in a victory for the Republican nominee for the first time since 1940 incumbent State Auditor of Missouri Kit Bond, was chosen over the Democratic nominee, Edward L. Dowd, and nonpartisan Paul J. Leonard. Joseph P. Teasdale was a candidate for the Democratic Party nomination, before winning the nomination in the 1976 election, as was lieutenant governor William S. Morris, while Gene McNary was a candidate for the Republican nomination.

== Results ==
1972 gubernatorial election, Missouri
Party	Candidate	Votes	%	±%
Republican	Kit Bond	1,029,451	55.18	+15.98
Democratic	Edward L. Dowd	832,751	44.64	−16.16
Nonpartisan	Paul J. Leonard	3,481	0.19	+0.19
Majority		196,700	10.54	−11.06
Turnout		1,865,683	39.89	−0.96
Republican gain from Democratic		Swing		
