= Tom Zych =

American politician (1940–2023)

Thomas E. Zych (January 24, 1940 – November 11, 2023) was an American politician and minister. He was a Democrat from St. Louis, Missouri, serving in the Missouri House of Representatives, and later as President of the St. Louis Board of Aldermen.

== Biography ==
Thomas E. Zych was born on January 24, 1940. He was educated at St. Mary's High School in St. Louis and attended Southeast Missouri State University. He graduated from Washington University in St. Louis with a degree in secondary education.

In 1974, he was elected to the Missouri House of Representatives from District 100. In the 1980s, he served two terms as President of the St. Louis Board of Aldermen. Starting in 1984, Zych faced charges, of which he was later acquitted, that he and five others had defrauded the city of St. Louis in their attempts to get a franchise for cable television in 1983. The others involved in the legal case included Sorkis Webbe Jr., an alderman in the 7th Ward; Sorkis Webbe Sr., a powerful St. Louis politician; LeRoy Tyus, a politician and democratic committee leader; James D. Cullen, Jr. a lawyer; and Eugene P. Slay, a businessman. He did not run for the office in 1987.

In 1989, Zych became a Methodist minister, subsequently serving two Bootheel congregations. In 2005, he became an employee of Recreation Division of the St. Louis Department of Parks He later became the director of the Cherokee Recreation Center in Benton Park, St. Louis.

Zych died on November 11, 2023, at the age of 83.
