= LeRoy Braungardt =

American politician

LeRoy D. Braungardt (10 September 1939 – 17 November 2015) was an American politician.

Braungardt was born in Moscow Mills, Missouri, on 10 September 1939, one of four children to parents Julius and Lillian Braungardt. He married Bonnie Sue Kirchner, a high school classmate, in 1957. The couple had three children. Braungardt was an electrician for 22 years. Influenced by Owen Turnbull, Braungardt became a conservationist. After retiring from Cuivre River Electric, Braungardt served on the Missouri House of Representatives between 1978 and 1985. He died in Moscow Mills on 17 November 2015, aged 76.
