= Missouri State Museum =

Museum in Missouri, US

Coordinates: 38°34′44″N 92°10′21″W

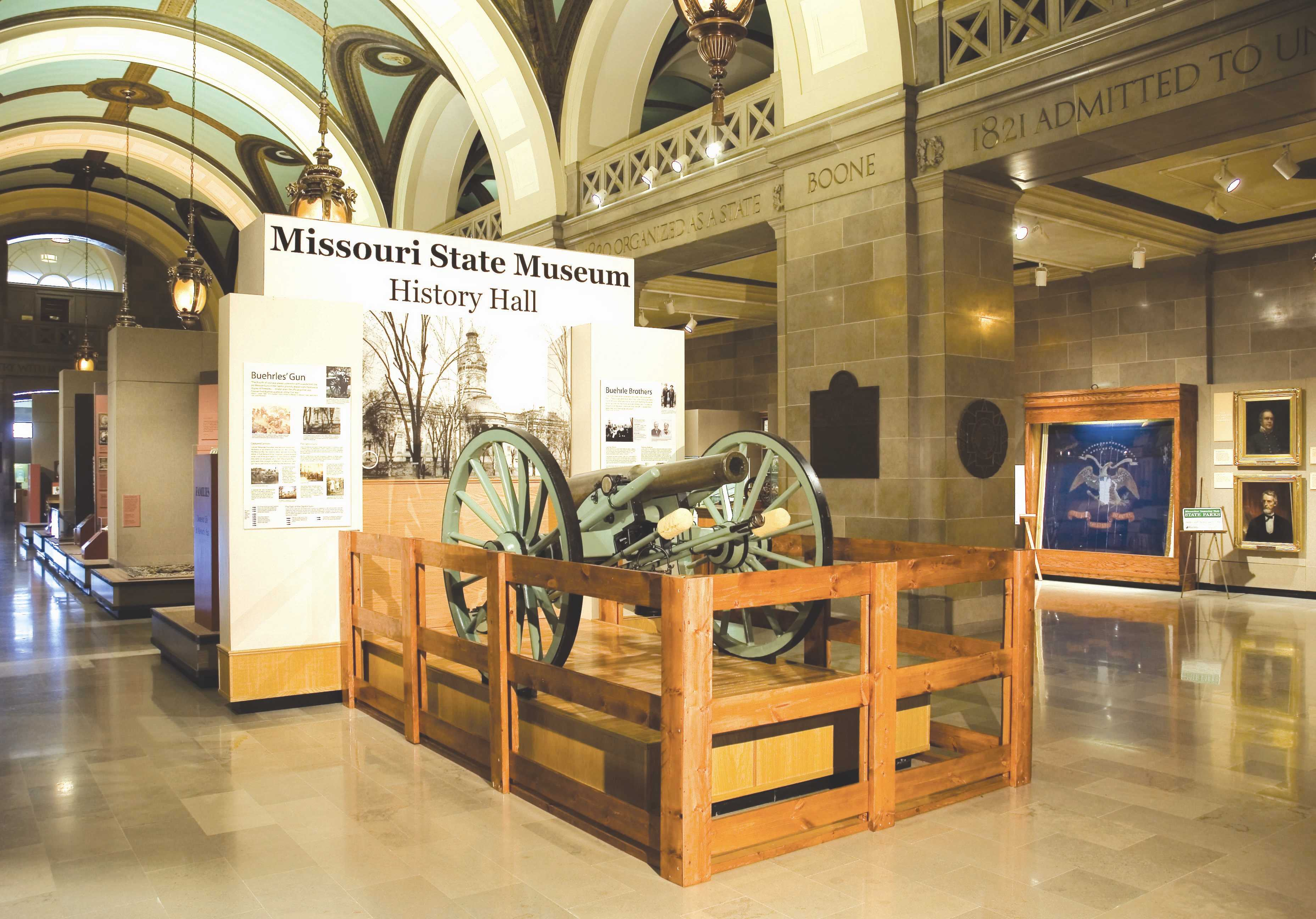
Entry to the Missouri State Museum

The Missouri State Museum is Missouri's showpiece museum. It was founded in 1919 and is located in Jefferson City, Missouri, inside the state capitol on the ground floor of the building.

In June 2025, the Missouri State Museum opened an exhibit on folk art.
