= 2020 Vermont elections =

A general election was held in the U.S. state of Vermont on November 3, 2020. All of Vermont's executive officers were up for election, as well as Vermont's at-large seat in the United States House of Representatives. Primary elections were held on August 11, 2020.

== United States House of Representatives ==
The incumbent representative was Democrat Peter Welch.

== Governor ==
The incumbent governor was Republican Phil Scott. He beat Lieutenant Governor David Zuckerman in the general election.

== Lieutenant governor ==
2020 Vermont lieutenant gubernatorial election
- November 3, 2020
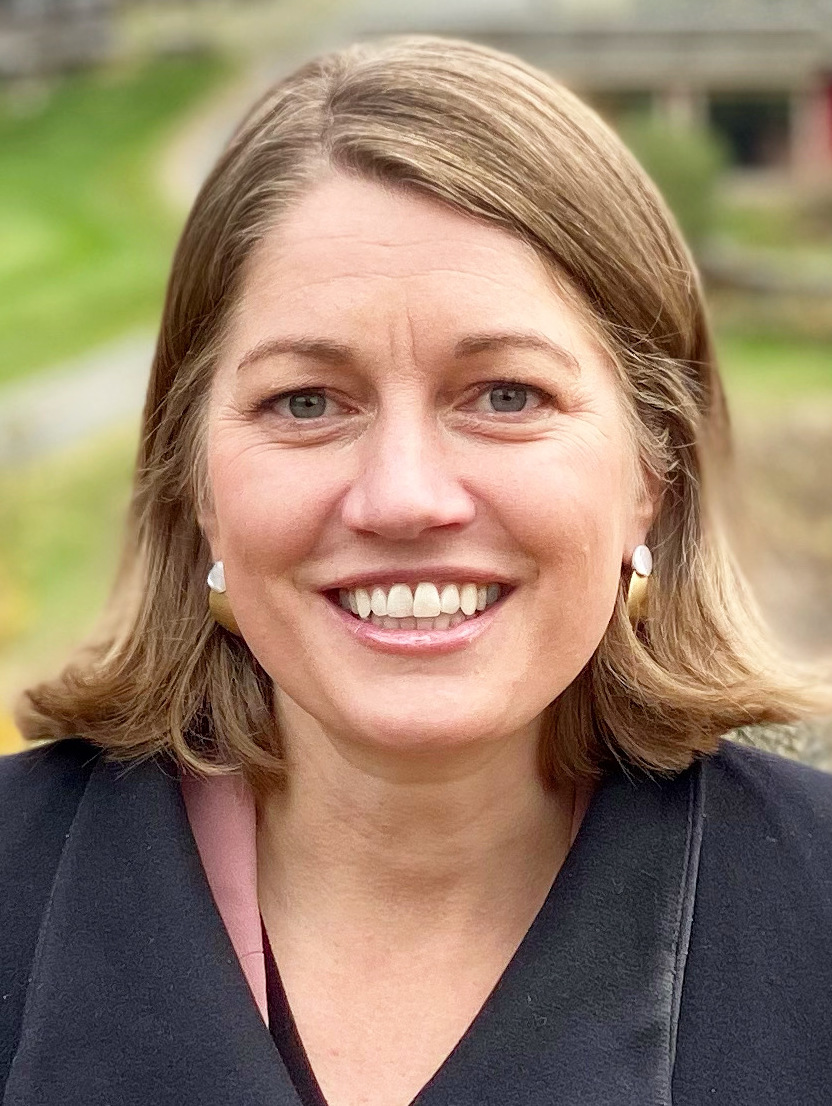

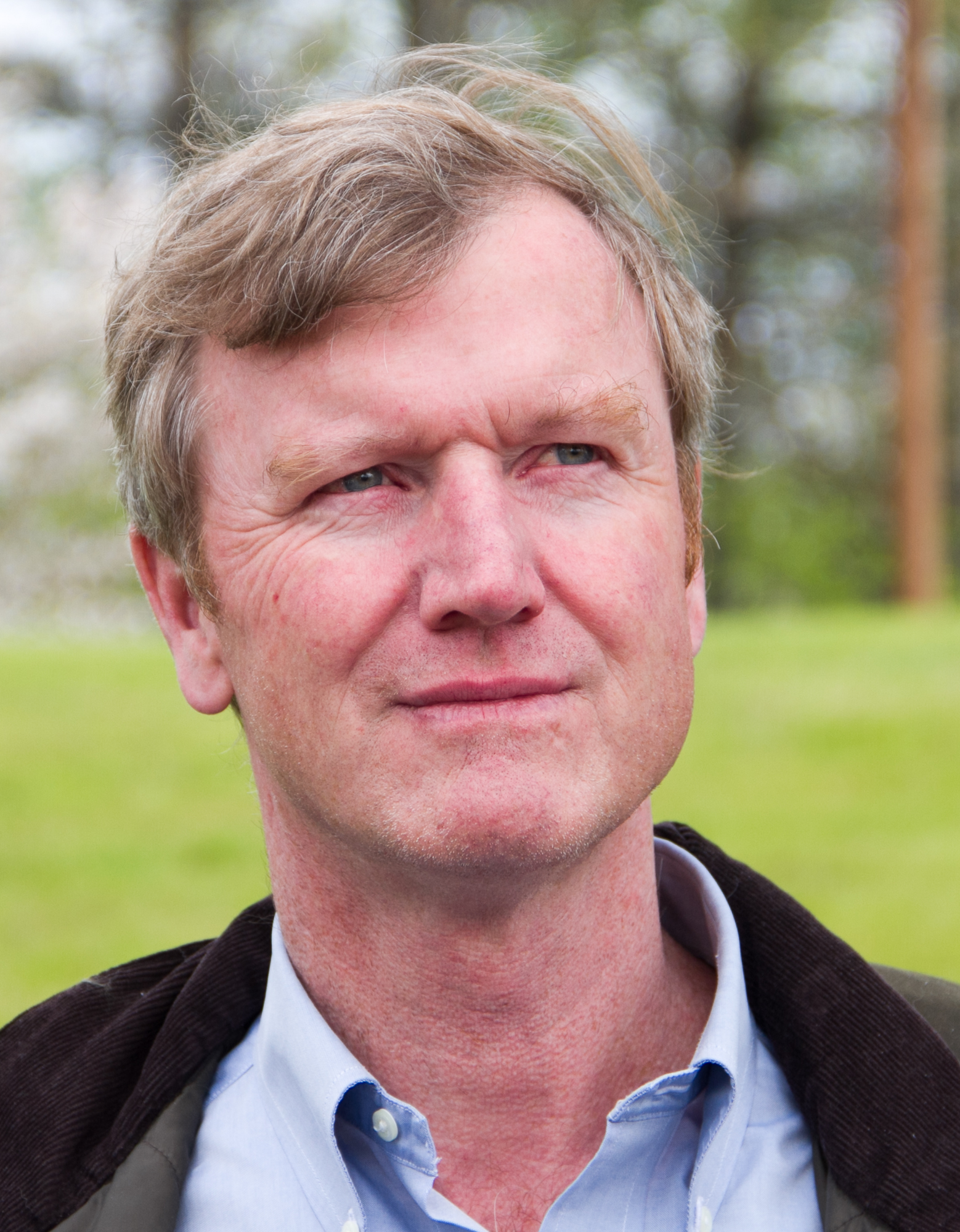
| Nominee | Molly Gray | Scott Milne |
| Party | Democratic | Republican |
| Popular vote | 182,820 | 157,065 |
| Percentage | 51.3% | 44.1% |
- Gray: 40–50% 50–60% 60–70% 70–80% 80–90% Milne: 40–50% 50–60% 60–70% 70–80% 80–90% Tie: 40–50%
Lieutenant Governor before election
Dave Zuckerman
Progressive/Democratic
Elected Lieutenant Governor
Molly Gray
Democratic

Incumbent Progressive/Democratic lieutenant governor Dave Zuckerman (since 2017) declined to run for a third term, and instead ran for governor.

=== Democratic primary ===
==== Candidates ====
===== Nominee =====
- Molly Gray, Vermont Assistant Attorney General

===== Eliminated in primary =====
- Tim Ashe, President pro tempore of the Vermont Senate (also ran in Progressive primary)
- Debbie Ingram, Chittenden County State Senator
- Brenda Siegel, candidate for governor in 2018, opioid epidemic and Brattleboro hurricane relief activist, southern Vermont nonprofit founder and executive director (also ran in Progressive primary)

===== Declined =====
- Shap Smith, former Speaker of the Vermont House of Representatives, candidate for lieutenant governor in 2016, attorney
- David Zuckerman, incumbent lieutenant governor (ran for governor)

==== Results ====
Democratic primary results
| Party | Candidate | Votes | % |
|---|---|---|---|
| Democratic | Molly Gray | 47,636 | 46.0 |
| Democratic | Tim Ashe | 35,954 | 34.7 |
| Democratic | Brenda Siegel | 9,945 | 9.6 |
| Democratic | Debbie Ingram | 9,466 | 9.1 |
| Write-in | Write-ins | 568 | 0.5 |
| Total votes | | 103,645 | 100.0 |

=== Republican primary ===
==== Candidates ====
===== Nominee =====
- Scott Milne, Republican nominee for governor in 2014, Republican nominee for US Senate in 2016, businessman

===== Eliminated in primary =====
- Dana Colson Jr.
- Meg Hansen, former executive director of Vermonters for Healthcare Freedom
- Jim Hogue, Vermont secession activist
- Dwayne Tucker, contractor and civil engineer

===== Declined =====
- Don H. Turner Jr., nominee for lieutenant governor in 2018, former minority leader of the Vermont House of Representatives

==== Results ====
Republican primary results
| Party | Candidate | Votes | % |
|---|---|---|---|
| Republican | Scott Milne | 26,817 | 51.5 |
| Republican | Meg Hansen | 16,875 | 32.4 |
| Republican | Dwayne Tucker | 3,066 | 5.9 |
| Republican | Dana Colson | 2,736 | 5.2 |
| Republican | Jim Hogue | 1,944 | 3.7 |
| Write-in | Write-ins | 680 | 1.3 |
| Total votes | | 52,118 | 100.0 |

=== Progressive primary ===
Incumbent Progressive lieutenant governor David Zuckerman did not run for a third term.

==== Candidates ====
===== Declared =====
- Tim Ashe, President pro tempore of the Vermont Senate
- Cris Ericson, perennial candidate
- Brenda Siegel, candidate for governor in 2018, opioid epidemic and Brattleboro hurricane relief activist, southern Vermont nonprofit founder and executive director

===== Declined =====
- David Zuckerman, incumbent lieutenant governor (running for governor)

==== Results ====
Progressive primary results
| Party | Candidate | Votes | % |
|---|---|---|---|
| Progressive | Cris Ericson | 438 | 57.5 |
| Write-in | Write-ins | 324 | 42.5 |
| Total votes | | 762 | 100.0 |

=== General election ===
==== Debate ====
2020 Vermont lieutenant gubernatorial debate
| No. | Date | Host | Moderator | Link | Democratic | Republican | Progressive | Independent | Stop the F35s |
| Key: P Participant A Absent N Not invited I Invited W Withdrawn | | | | | | | | | |
| Key: P Participant A Absent N Not invited I Invited W Withdrawn | | | | | Molly Gray | Scott Milne | Cris Ericson | Wayne Billado III | Ralph Corbo |
|---|---|---|---|---|---|---|---|---|---|
| 1 | Sep. 23, 2022 | Town Meeting TV | Stephanie Lahar | YouTube | P | P | N | N | P |

==== Polling ====
| Poll source | Date(s) administered | Sample size (Note: Key: A – all adults RV – registered voters LV – likely voters V – unclear) | Margin of error | Molly Gray (D) | Scott Milne (R) | Other | Undecided |
|---|---|---|---|---|---|---|---|
| co/efficient/Scott Milne for Lt. Governor (Note: Poll sponsored by Milne's campaign in the 2020 Vermont lieutenant gubernatorial election) | October 19–29, 2020 | 584 (LV) | ± 4.05% | 43% | 37% | 7% | 13% |
| Braun Research/VPR | September 3–15, 2020 | 582 (LV) | ± 4% | 35% | 31% | 34% (Note: "Other/not sure/no opinion" with 24%; Ericson (Progressive) and "No one/not voting on this item" with 4%; Billado (I) with 2%; Cordo (Banish the F35s) with 0%) | – |

==== Results ====
2020 Vermont lieutenant gubernatorial election
| Party | Candidate | Votes | % |
|---|---|---|---|
| Democratic | Molly Gray | 182,820 | 51.3 |
| Republican | Scott Milne | 157,065 | 44.1 |
| Progressive | Cris Ericson | 7,862 | 2.2 |
| Independent | Wayne Billado III | 5,101 | 1.4 |
| Stop the F35s | Ralph Corbo | 2,289 | 0.6 |
| Write-in | Write-ins | 1,097 | 0.3 |
| Total votes | | 356,234 | 100.0 |

== Secretary of state ==
2020 Vermont secretary of state election
- November 3, 2020
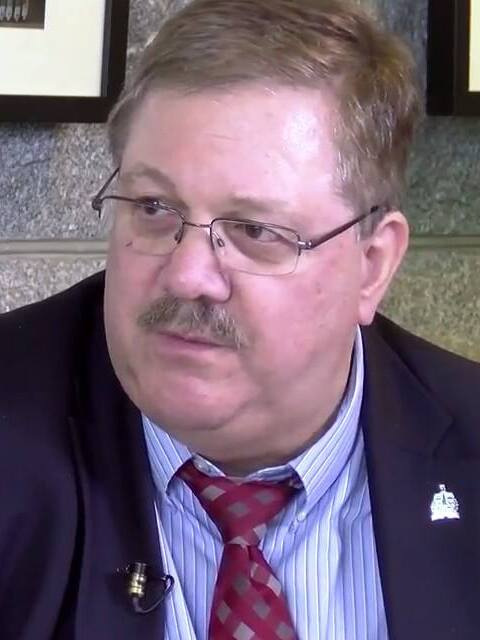

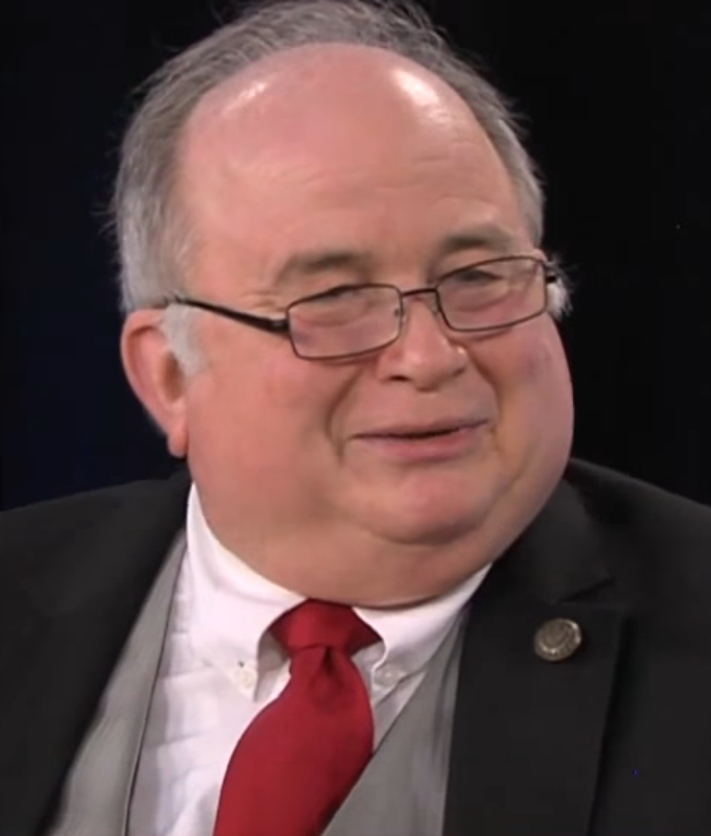

| Nominee | Jim Condos | H. Brooke Paige | Pamala Smith |
| Party | Democratic | Republican | Independent |
| Popular vote | 214,666 | 99,564 | 21,210 |
| Percentage | 61.88% | 28.70% | 6.11% |
- Condos: 40–50% 50–60% 60–70% 70–80% 80–90% Paige: 40–50% 50–60% 60–70% Tie: 40–50%
Secretary of State before election
Jim Condos
Democratic
Elected Secretary of State
Jim Condos
Democratic

The incumbent secretary of state was Democrat Jim Condos.

=== Democratic primary ===
==== Candidates ====
===== Declared =====
- Jim Condos, incumbent secretary of state

=== Republican primary ===
==== Candidates ====
===== Declared =====
- H. Brooke Paige, perennial candidate.

=== Predictions ===
| Source | Ranking | As of |
|---|---|---|
| The Cook Political Report | Safe D | June 25, 2020 |

== State Treasurer ==
2020 Vermont state treasurer election
- November 3, 2020
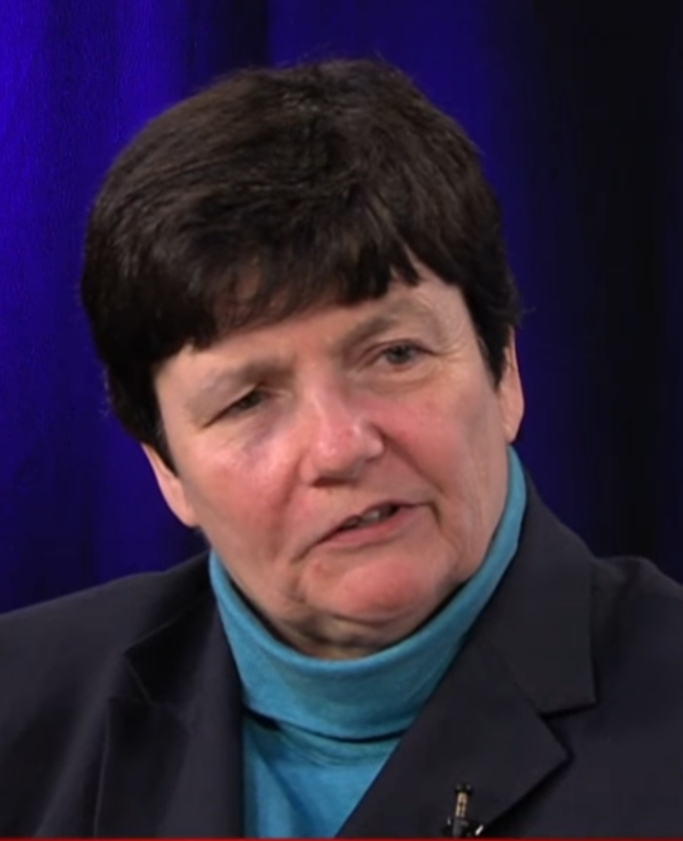

| Nominee | Beth Pearce | Carolyn Whitney Branagan |
| Party | Democratic | Republican |
| Popular vote | 197,255 | 114,177 |
| Percentage | 53.17 | 30.78 |
- Pearce: 40–50% 50–60% 60–70% 70–80% 80–90% Branagan: 40–50% 50–60% 60–70% 70–80% Tie: 40–50%
Treasurer before election
Beth Pearce
Democratic
Elected Treasurer
Beth Pearce
Democratic

The incumbent treasurer was Democrat Beth Pearce.

=== Democratic primary ===
==== Candidates ====
===== Declared =====
- Beth Pearce, incumbent treasurer

=== Republican primary ===
==== Candidates ====
===== Declared =====
- Carolyn Whitney Branagan, former state representative to Franklin-1 (2003–2017) and former state senator to Franklin (2017–2019)

== Attorney general ==
2020 Vermont Attorney General election
- November 3, 2020

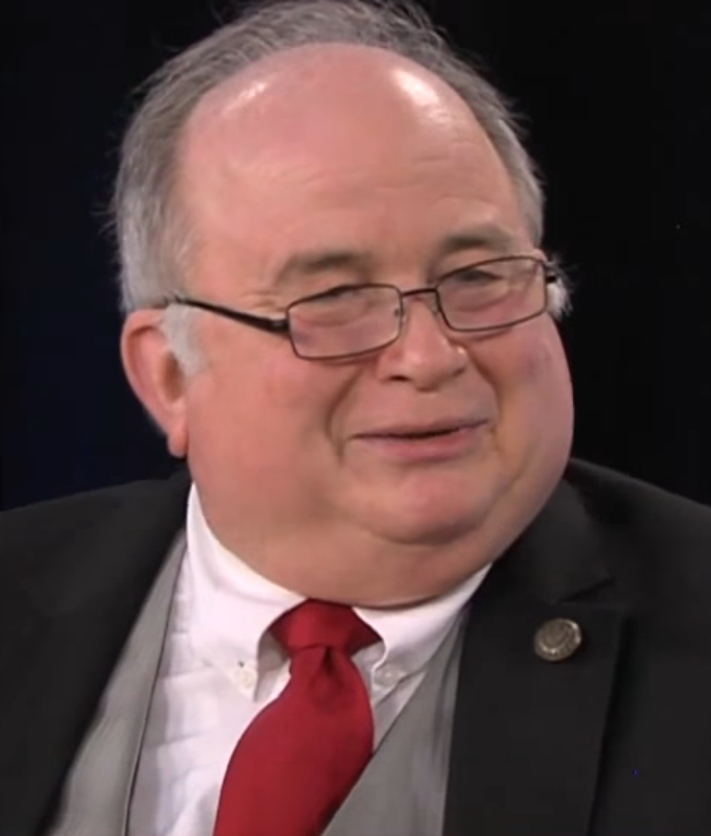
| Nominee | T. J. Donovan | H. Brooke Paige |
| Party | Democratic | Republican |
| Popular vote | 234,081 | 94,892 |
| Percentage | 63.10 | 25.58 |
- Donovan: 40–50% 50–60% 60–70% 70–80% 80–90% Paige: 40–50% 50–60% Tie: 40–50%
Attorney General before election
T. J. Donovan
Democratic
Elected Attorney General
T. J. Donovan
Democratic

The incumbent attorney general was Democrat T. J. Donovan.

=== Democratic primary ===
==== Candidates ====
===== Declared =====
- T.J. Donovan, incumbent attorney general

=== Republican primary ===
The Republican nominee was H. Brooke Paige.

==== Candidates ====
===== Declared =====
- H. Brooke Paige, perennial candidate
- Emily Peyton, candidate for governor in 2018

=== Progressive primary ===
==== Candidates ====
===== Declared =====
- Cris Ericson, perennial candidate, running for other statewide offices as well

=== Predictions ===
| Source | Ranking | As of |
|---|---|---|
| The Cook Political Report | Safe D | June 25, 2020 |

== State Auditor ==
2020 Vermont Auditor election
- November 3, 2020
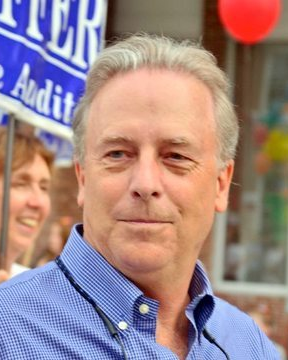

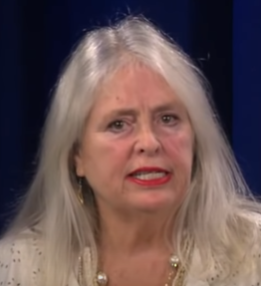
| Nominee | Doug Hoffer | Cris Ericson |
| Party | Democratic | Progressive |
| Alliance | Progressive; Republican | Marijuana |
| Popular vote | 266,445 | 48,731 |
| Percentage | 84.04 | 15.37 |
- Hoffer: 60–70% 70–80% 80–90% 90–100%
Auditor before election
Doug Hoffer
Democratic
Elected Auditor
Doug Hoffer
Democratic

The incumbent auditor was Democrat/Progressive Doug Hoffer.

=== Democratic primary ===
==== Candidates ====
===== Declared =====
- Doug Hoffer, incumbent auditor (also ran in Progressive primary)
- Linda Joy Sullivan, state representative

=== Republican primary ===
No candidates filed for the Republican primary. Doug Hoffer won the nomination via write-in.

=== Progressive primary ===
Incumbent Democratic/Progressive Auditor Doug Hoffer also ran in the Progressive primary. Perennial candidate Cris Ericson ran for the Progressive nomination for auditor, as well as several other statewide offices.

==== Candidates ====
===== Declared =====
- Cris Ericson, perennial candidate
- Doug Hoffer, incumbent auditor (also ran in Democratic primary)

=== General election ===
==== Candidates ====
- Cris Ericson (P*), perennial candidate
- Doug Hoffer (D/P*/R), incumbent auditor

Hoffer won the Democratic and Republican nominations. Ericson, who was not a member of the Progressive Party, won the primary election. However, the Progressive state committee endorsed Hoffer for reelection. He had previously been nominated by both the Democratic and Progressive Parties in elections from 2010 to 2018.

== State legislature ==
All 30 seats in the Vermont Senate and all 150 seats of the Vermont House of Representatives were up for election. The balance of political power remained the same in each chamber, with Democrats having large majorities in both; however, Republicans made very small gains in both chambers. While those gains were small, they allowed Republicans to break the Democrat/Progressive supermajority in the state house. This could potentially lead to any veto from Governor Phil Scott being upheld under these new circumstances.

=== State senate ===
| Party | # of seats before election | # of seats after election | Net change |
|---|---|---|---|
| Democratic | 22 | 21 | ▼1 |
| Republican | 6 | 7 | ▲1 |
| Progressive | 2 | 2 | Steady |
| Independent | 0 | 0 | Steady |

=== House of Representatives ===
| Party | # of seats before election | # of seats after election | Net change |
|---|---|---|---|
| Democratic | 95 | 92 | ▼3 |
| Republican | 43 | 46 | ▲3 |
| Progressive | 7 | 7 | Steady |
| Independent | 5 | 5 | Steady |

== County offices ==
Some county level offices were up for election. The balance of political power before and after the elections for each office was:

=== Addison County ===
| Office | Name | Party |
|---|---|---|
| States Attorney | Dennis Wygmans | Democratic |
| Assistant Judge | Patricia Ross | Democratic |
| Assistant Judge | Jacqueline Mclean | Democratic |
| Probate Judge | Eleanor Smith | Democratic |
| Sheriff | Peter Dorey Newton | Democratic |
| High Bailiff | Charles S. Clark Jr. | Rep/Dem |

=== Bennington County ===
| Office | Name | Party |
|---|---|---|
| States Attorney | Erica Albin Marthage | Democratic |
| Assistant Judge | James H. Colvin | Democratic |
| Assistant Judge | Wesley L. Mook | Democratic |
| Probate Judge | D. Justine Scanlon | Democratic |
| Sheriff | Chad D. Schmidt | Dem/Rep |
| High Bailiff | Frederick C. Gilbar | Democratic |

=== Caledonia County ===
| Office | Name | Party |
|---|---|---|
| States Attorney | Lisa A. Warren | Dem/Rep |
| Assistant Judge | John S. Hall | Rep/Dem |
| Assistant Judge | Roy C. Vance | Dem/Rep |
| Probate Judge | William W. Cobb | Democratic |
| Sheriff | Dean Shatney | Dem/Rep |
| High Bailiff | Stephen Bunnell | Rep/Dem |

=== Chittenden County ===
| Office | Name | Party |
|---|---|---|
| States Attorney | Sarah F. George | Democratic |
| Assistant Judge | Suzanne Brown | Dem/Rep |
| Assistant Judge | Connie Cain Ramsey | Democratic |
| Probate Judge | Gregory J. Glennon | Democratic |
| Sheriff | Kevin M. McLaughlin | Dem/Rep |
| High Bailiff | Daniel L. Gamelin | Dem/Prog/Rep |

=== Essex County ===
| Office | Name | Party |
|---|---|---|
| States Attorney | Vincent Illuzzi | Prog/Rep/Dem/Lib |
| Assistant Judge | Calvin Colby | Republican |
| Assistant Judge | Allen D. Hodgdon | Republican |
| Probate Judge | Allen D. Hodgdon | Republican |
| Sheriff | Trevor Colby | Rep/Prog |
| High Bailiff | Vacant | N/A |

=== Franklin County ===
| Office | Name | Party |
|---|---|---|
| States Attorney | James A. Hughes | Democratic |
| Assistant Judge | Kelly Gosselin | Democratic |
| Assistant Judge | Robert Johnson | Dem/Rep |
| Probate Judge | Vaughn Comeau | Republican |
| Sheriff | Roger Langevin | Democratic |
| High Bailiff | Roberta Allard | Democratic |

=== Grand Isle County ===
| Office | Name | Party |
|---|---|---|
| States Attorney | Douglas Disabito | Democratic |
| Assistant Judge | Sherri Potvin | Democratic |
| Assistant Judge | Joanne R. Batchelder | Rep/Dem |
| Probate Judge | George Ned Spear | Democratic |
| Sheriff | Ray C. Allen | Dem/Prog/Rep |
| High Bailiff | Kevin G. Winch | Independent |

=== Lamoille County ===
| Office | Name | Party |
|---|---|---|
| States Attorney | Todd A. Shove | Democratic |
| Assistant Judge | Joel W. Page | Democratic |
| Assistant Judge | Madeline M. Motta | Democratic |
| Probate Judge | James Dean R. Mahoney | Independent |
| Sheriff | Roger M. Marcoux Jr. | Dem/Rep |
| High Bailiff | Claude D. Ammons Jr. | Democratic |

=== Orange County ===
| Office | Name | Party |
|---|---|---|
| States Attorney | William J. Porter | Democratic |
| Assistant Judge | Joyce McKeeman | Democratic |
| Assistant Judge | Victoria Weiss | Democratic |
| Probate Judge | Kathryn C. A. Kennedy | Democratic |
| Sheriff | Bill Bohnyak | Democratic |
| High Bailiff | George Contois | Democratic |

=== Orleans County ===
| Office | Name | Party |
|---|---|---|
| States Attorney | Jennifer Barrett | Dem/Rep |
| Assistant Judge | Benjamin Batchelder | Dem/Rep |
| Assistant Judge | Curtis A. Hardy | Democratic |
| Probate Judge | Robert B. Chimileski | Independent |
| Sheriff | Kirk J. Martin | Republican |
| High Bailiff | Philip Brooks | Republican |

=== Rutland County ===
| Office | Name | Party |
|---|---|---|
| States Attorney | Rose Kennedy | Democratic |
| Assistant Judge | Jean H. Colourtti | Dem/Rep |
| Assistant Judge | David W. Lewis | Dem/Rep |
| Probate Judge | Karl C. Anderson | Republican |
| Sheriff | Stephen P. Benard Sr. | Dem/Rep |
| High Bailiff | David Fox | Democratic |

=== Washington County ===
| Office | Name | Party |
|---|---|---|
| States Attorney | Rory T. Thibault | Democratic |
| Assistant Judge | Miriam Conlon | Democratic |
| Assistant Judge | Otto Kinzel Trautz | Dem/Rep |
| Probate Judge | Jeffrey P. Kilgore | Democratic |
| Sheriff | W. Samuel Hill | Dem/Rep |
| High Bailiff | Marc Poulin | Democratic |

=== Windham County ===
| Office | Name | Party |
|---|---|---|
| States Attorney | Tracy Kelly Shriver | Democratic |
| Assistant Judge | Patricia W. Duff | Democratic |
| Assistant Judge | Lamont Barnett | Democratic |
| Probate Judge | Jodi P. French | Democratic |
| Sheriff | Keith D. Clark | Democratic |
| High Bailiff | Mark Anderson | Democratic |

=== Windsor County ===
| Office | Name | Party |
|---|---|---|
| States Attorney | David Cahill | Democratic |
| Assistant Judge | Jack W. Anderson | Democratic |
| Assistant Judge | Eleen Terie | Democratic |
| Probate Judge | Frederick M. Glover | Democratic |
| Sheriff | Michael Chamberlain | Democratic |
| High Bailiff | Michael E. Manley | Democratic |

== Notes ==
Partisan clients
