= 2022 Vermont elections =

- November 8, 2022

A general election was held in the U.S. state of Vermont in 2022. All of Vermont's executive officers were up for election as well as Vermont's Class 3 U.S. Senate seat and its lone seat in the U.S. House of Representatives.

== State treasurer ==
2022 Vermont State Treasurer election
- November 8, 2022
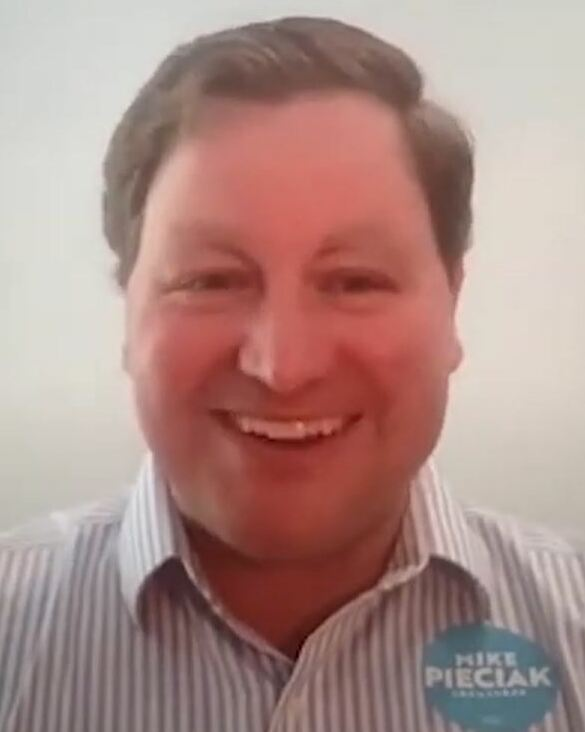

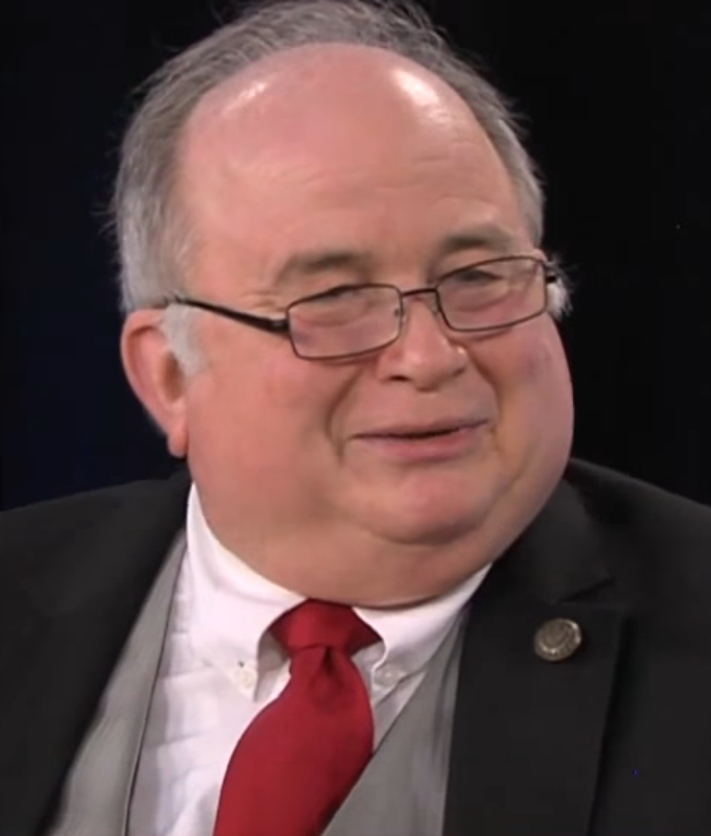
Nominee	Mike Pieciak	H. Brooke Paige
Party	Democratic	Republican
Popular vote	182,571	95,440
Percentage	65.59%	34.29%
- Pearce: 50–60% 60–70% 70–80% 80–90% Paige: 50–60% 60–70%
State Treasurer before election
Beth Pearce
Democratic
Elected State Treasurer
Mike Pieciak
Democratic

Incumbent state treasurer Beth Pearce was eligible to seek a sixth term in office, but instead chose to retire due to a diagnosis of cancer. Pieciak swept the election, securing every county except for Essex. He performed well across the state, crossing the margin of 80% in 12 municipalities. Those included Burlington, the most populous city in the state, the neighboring city of Winooski and the capital city of Montpelier. Conversely, Paige recorded his best result in the northern part of the state, narrowly failing to reach 70% in the town of Victory.

=== Democratic primary ===
==== Candidates ====
===== Nominee =====
- Mike Pieciak, former commissioner of the Vermont Department of Financial Regulation

===== Declined =====
- Beth Pearce, incumbent state treasurer (endorsed Pieciak)

==== Endorsements ====
Mike Pieciak

Statewide officials

- Beth Pearce, Vermont State Treasurer
- Peter Shumlin, former governor of Vermont
- William Sorrell, former Vermont Attorney General

=== Republican primary ===
After winning the primary, Paige indicated that he would drop out and let the Vermont Republican Party choose a replacement nominee. However, the party's executive committee could not find another candidate in time, and Paige continued as the Republican nominee.

==== Candidates ====
===== Nominee =====
- H. Brooke Paige, newsstand owner and perennial candidate

===== Withdrew before primary =====
- Kevin Divney, financial analyst

===== Declined =====
- Wendy Wilton, former Rutland City Treasurer, former state representative, and nominee for state treasurer in 2012

=== Progressive primary ===
==== Candidates ====
===== Withdrew after winning primary =====
- Don Schramm, cofounder of Burlington Co-housing

== Secretary of State ==
Incumbent secretary of state Jim Condos retired. Democratic nominee Sarah Copeland Hanzas was elected.

== State auditor ==
2022 Vermont State Auditor election
- November 8, 2022
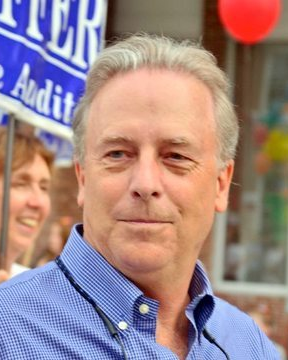

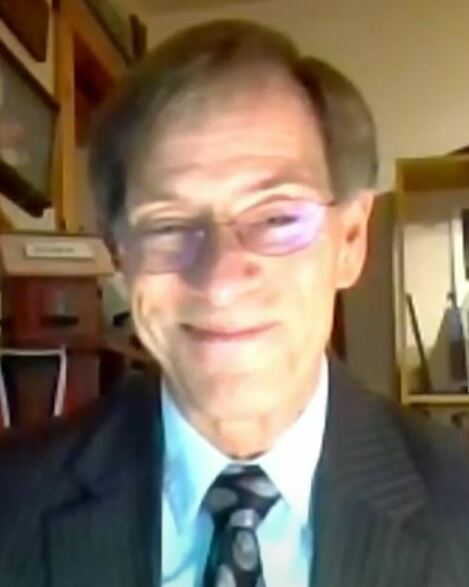
Nominee	Doug Hoffer	Richard Morton
Party	Democratic	Republican
Alliance	Progressive
Popular vote	179,098	95,661
Percentage	65.07%	34.76%
- Hoffer: 50–60% 60–70% 70–80% 80–90% Morton: 50–60% 60–70% 70–80% Tie: 50%
State Auditor before election
Doug Hoffer
Democratic
Elected State Auditor
Doug Hoffer
Democratic

Incumbent state auditor Doug Hoffer ran for re-election to a fifth term in office.

=== Democratic primary ===
==== Candidates ====
===== Declared =====
- Doug Hoffer, incumbent state auditor

=== Republican primary ===
==== Candidates ====
===== Withdrew after winning primary =====
- H. Brooke Paige, newsstand owner and perennial candidate

===== Replacement nominee =====
- Richard Morton, chair of the Windham County Republican Party and nominee for Vermont State Treasurer in 2018 (also running for state senate)

=== Progressive primary ===
==== Candidates ====
===== Withdrew after winning primary =====
- Marielle Blais, vice chair of the Vermont Progressive Party

===== Replacement nominee =====
- Doug Hoffer, incumbent state auditor (cross-endorsement of the Democratic nominee)

== Ballot measures ==
November 8, 2022, general election
No.	Description	Result	Yes		No		Type
No.	Description	Result	Votes	%	Votes	%	Type
2	Amends the Vermont Constitution to ban slavery as punishment for a crime.	Yes	238,466	88.7%	30,335	11.3%	Legislative
5	Amends the Vermont Constitution to add a right to reproductive autonomy.	Yes	212,323	76.8%	64,239	23.2%	Legislative
