= 2016 Vermont elections =

A general election was held in the U.S. state of Vermont on November 8, 2016. All of Vermont's executive officers were up for election as well as Vermont's Class III Senate seat and at-large seat in the United States House of Representatives. Primary elections were held on August 9, 2016.

== Lieutenant governor ==
Vermont lieutenant gubernatorial election, 2016
- November 8, 2016
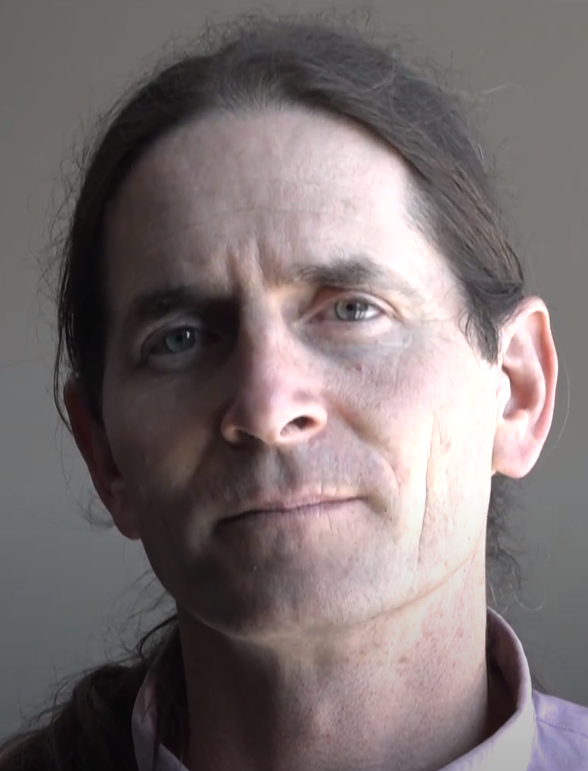

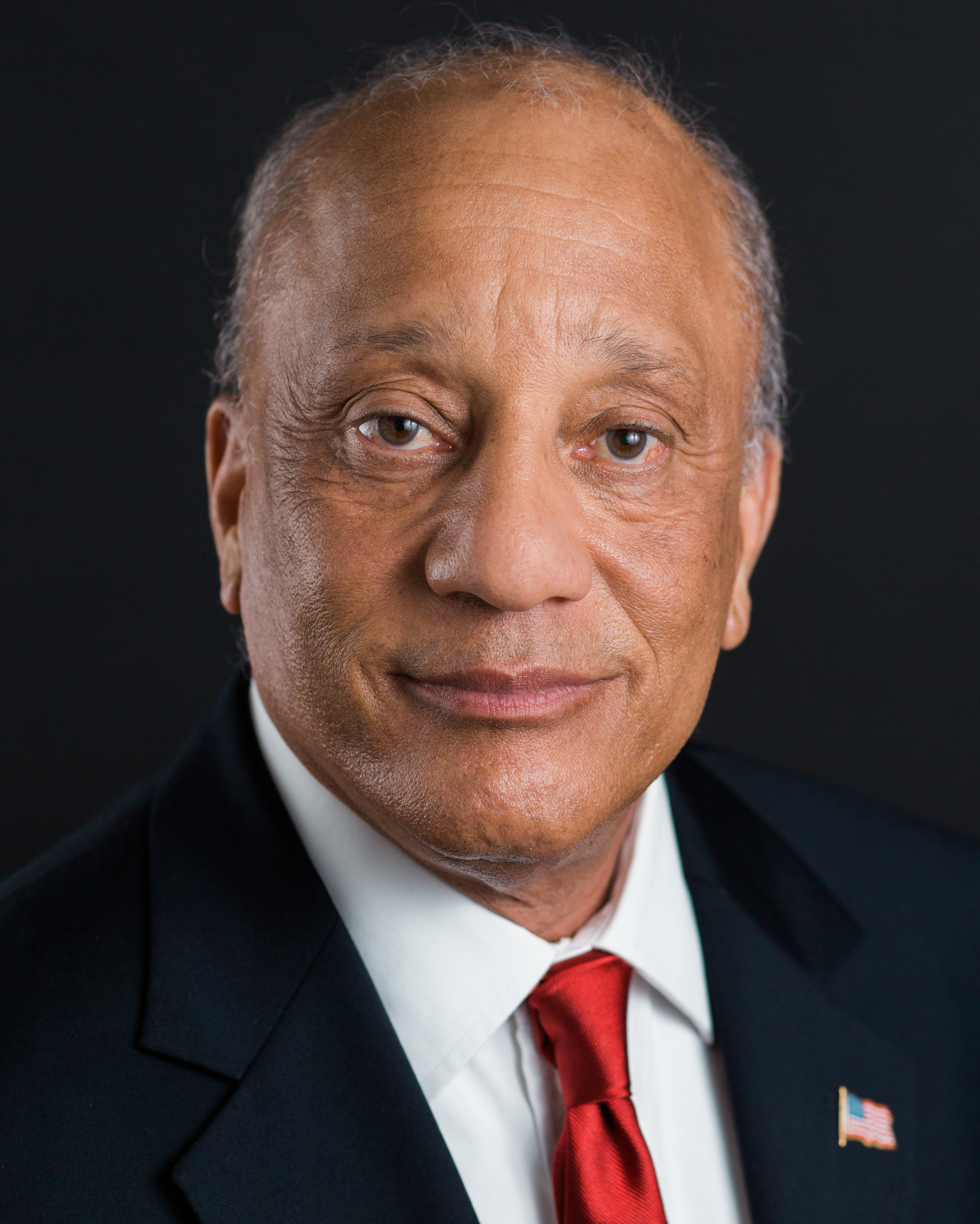
Nominee	Dave Zuckerman	Randy Brock
Party	Progressive	Republican
Alliance	Democratic	—
Popular vote	159,738	139,344
Percentage	52.09%	45.44%
- Zuckerman: 40–50% 50–60% 60–70% 70–80% Brock: 40–50% 50–60% 60–70% 70–80% No data/vote
Lieutenant Governor before election
Phil Scott
Republican
Elected Lieutenant Governor
Dave Zuckerman
Democratic/Progressive

Incumbent Republican lieutenant governor Phil Scott, who was first elected in 2010, did not run for reelection, and instead ran successfully for governor. Democrats won this office for the first time since 2000.

=== Republican primary ===
Randy Brock, former state auditor (2005–2007) and state senator (2009–2013), was unopposed in the Republican primary.

==== Results ====
Republican primary results
Party	Candidate	Votes	%
Republican	Randy Brock	37,361	80.5
Republican	Write-ins	1,394	3.0
Total votes		38,755	100%

=== Democratic primary ===
==== Candidates ====
===== Declared =====
- Kesha Ram, state representative
- Shap Smith, speaker of the Vermont House of Representatives
- Dave Zuckerman, state senator, farmer (also ran in Progressive primary)

===== Withdrawn =====
- Brandon Riker, businessman (endorsed Zuckerman)

==== Results ====
Democratic primary results
Party	Candidate	Votes	%
Democratic	Dave Zuckerman	31,027	42.7
Democratic	Shap Smith	26,569	36.6
Democratic	Kesha Ram	12,133	16.7
Democratic	Write-ins	323	0.46
Total votes		70,052	100%

=== Progressive primary ===
==== Candidates ====
- Boots Wardinski, farmer, activist
- Dave Zuckerman, state senator, farmer (write-in) (also ran in Democratic primary)

==== Results ====
Progressive primary results
Party	Candidate	Votes	%
Progressive	Dave Zuckerman (write-in)	228	50.67
Progressive	Boots Wardinski	150	33.33
Progressive	Write-ins (other)	72	16.0
Total votes		450	100%

=== Liberty Union nomination ===
Boots Wardinski ran unopposed for the Liberty Union State Committee's nomination for lieutenant governor. He also unsuccessfully ran in the Progressive primary.

=== General election ===
==== Candidates ====
- Randy Brock (R)
- Boots Wardinski (LU)
- Dave Zuckerman (P/D)

==== Polling ====
Poll source	Date(s) administered	Sample size	Margin of error	Randy Brock (R)	David Zuckerman (P/D)	Boots Wardinksi (LU)	Other	Undecided
RRH Elections	October 24–26, 2016	1,052	± 3.0%	39%	40%	1%	—	20%
Castleton Polling Institute	?	579	± 3.9%	26%	43%	1%	8%	20%

==== Results ====
General election results
Party	Candidate	Votes	%
Progressive/Democratic	Dave Zuckerman	159,738	52.09
Republican	Randy Brock	139,344	45.44
Liberty Union	Boots Wardinski	7,038	2.3
Write-in	Write-ins	559	0.18
Total votes		306,679	100%

== Secretary of state ==
Vermont secretary of state election, 2016
- November 8, 2016
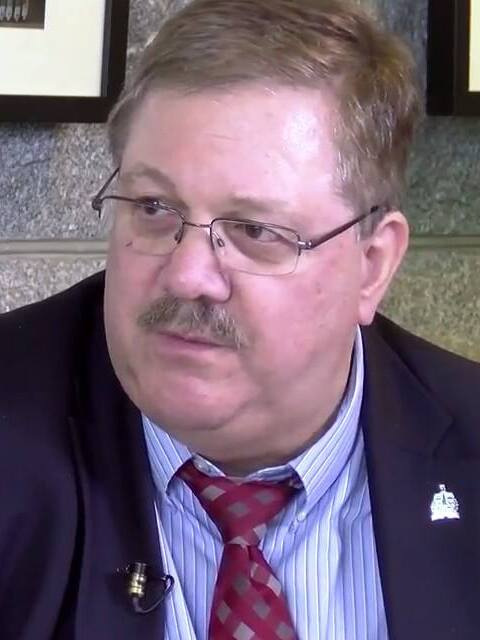

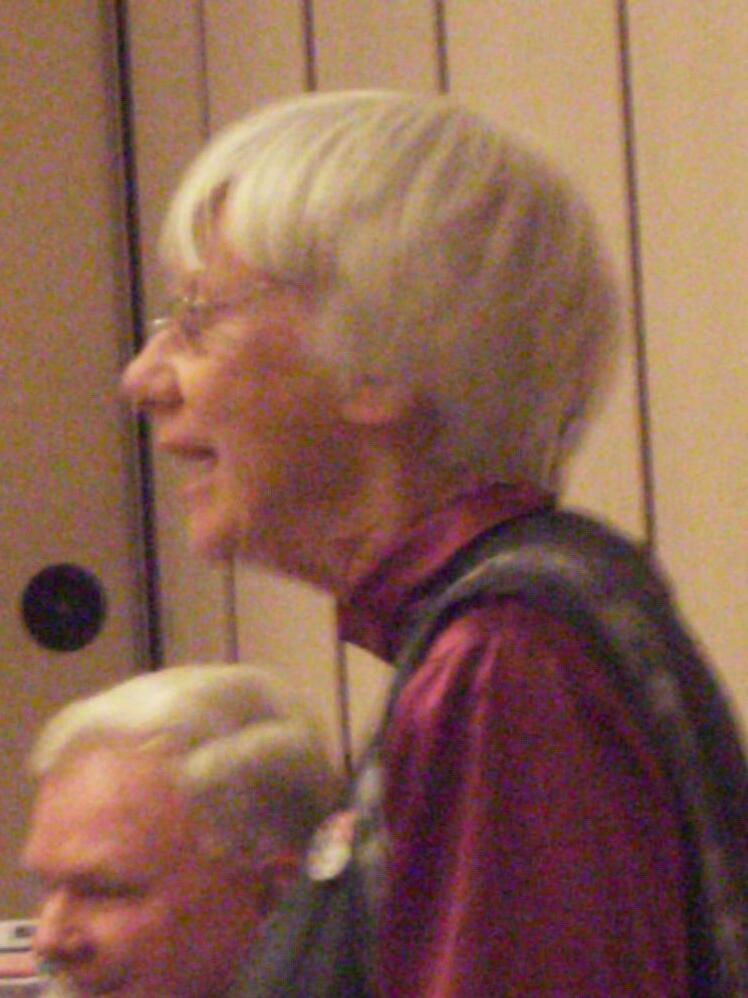
Nominee	Jim Condos	Mary Alice Herbert
Party	Democratic	Liberty Union
Popular vote	255,201	29,711
Percentage	89.38%	10.41%
- Condos: 70–80% 80–90% 90–100% No data/vote
Secretary of State before election
Jim Condos
Democratic
Elected Secretary of State
Jim Condos
Democratic

Incumbent Democratic Secretary of State Jim Condos (since 2011) ran again for a fourth term. This is to date the most recent election without H. Brooke Paige as the Republican nominee.

=== Democratic primary ===
Incumbent Jim Condos was unopposed in the Democratic primary.

==== Results ====
Democratic primary results
Party	Candidate	Votes	%
Democratic	Jim Condos	59,818	81.2
Democratic	Write-ins	219	0.0
Total votes		60,037	100%

=== Liberty Union nomination ===
Mary Alice Herbert, candidate for secretary of state in 2012, ran unopposed for the Liberty Union State Committee's nomination for secretary of state.

=== General election ===
==== Candidates ====
- Jim Condos (D/R)
- Mary Alice "Mal" Herbert (LU)

==== Results ====
General election results
Party	Candidate	Votes	%
Democratic	Jim Condos (incumbent)	255,201	89.38
Liberty Union	Mary Alice Herbert	29,711	10.41
Write-in	Write-ins	603	0.21
Total votes		285,515	100%

== Treasurer ==
2016 Vermont treasurer election
- November 8, 2016
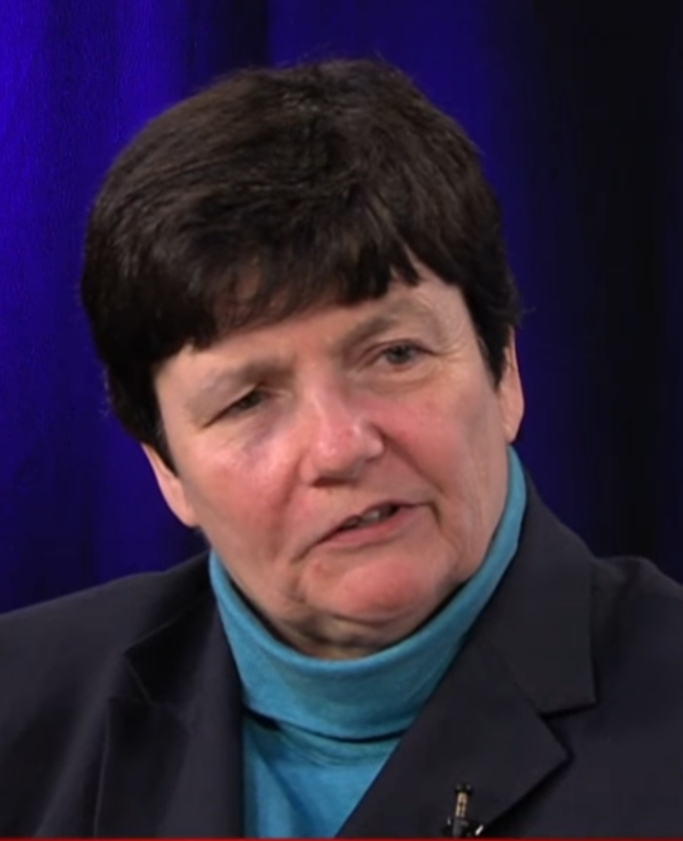

Nominee	Beth Pearce	Don Schramm
Party	Democratic	Progressive
Alliance	Republican
Popular vote	234,566	37,301
Percentage	82.3%	13.1%
- Pearce: 50–60% 60–70% 70–80% 80–90% 90–100% No data/vote
Treasurer before election
Beth Pearce
Democratic
Elected Treasurer
Beth Pearce
Democratic

Incumbent Democratic Treasurer Beth Pearce (since 2011) ran again for a fourth term.

=== Democratic primary ===
==== Candidates ====
- Richard Dunne, policy consultant
- Beth Pearce, incumbent (also ran in Republican primary)

==== Results ====
Democratic primary results
Party	Candidate	Votes	%
Democratic	Beth Pearce	40,939	56.0
Democratic	Richard Dunne	20,929	28.6
Democratic	Write-ins	73	0.01
Total votes		61,941	100%

=== Republican primary ===
==== Candidates ====
- Beth Pearce, incumbent (write-in) (also ran in Democratic primary)
- Wendy Wilton, nominee for treasurer in 2012 (write-in)

==== Results ====
Republican primary results
Party	Candidate	Votes	%
Republican	Beth Pearce (write-in)	1,467	48.48
Republican	Richard Dunne (write-in)	573	18.94
Republican	Wendy Wilton (write-in)	180	5.95
Republican	Write-ins (other)	806	26.64
Total votes		3,026	100%

=== Progressive primary ===
==== Candidates ====
- Don Schramm, nominee for treasurer in 2014, 2012, 2010, and 2008 (write-in)

==== Results ====
Progressive primary results
Party	Candidate	Votes	%
Progressive	Don Schramm (write-in)	112	38.89
Progressive	Write-ins (other)	176	61.11
Total votes		288	100%

=== Liberty Union nomination ===
Murray Ngoima, nominee for treasurer in 2014, 2010, and 2008, ran unopposed for the Liberty Union State Committee's nomination for treasurer.

=== General election ===
==== Candidates ====
- Murray Ngoima (LU)
- Beth Pearce (D/R)
- Don Schramm (P)

==== Results ====
General election results
Party	Candidate	Votes	%
Democratic	Beth Pearce (incumbent)	234,566	82.3
Progressive	Don Schramm	37,301	13.1
Liberty Union	Murray Ngoima	12,453	4.4
Write-in	Write-ins	667	0.07
Total votes		284,987	100%

== Attorney general ==
Vermont attorney general election, 2016
- November 8, 2016

Nominee	T.J. Donovan	Deborah Bucknam
Party	Democratic	Republican
Popular vote	200,020	88,431
Percentage	66.56%	29.43%
- Donovan: 40–50% 50–60% 60–70% 70–80% 80–90% Bucknam: 40–50% 50–60% 60–70% No data/vote
Attorney General before election
T.J. Donovan
Democratic
Elected Attorney General
T.J. Donovan
Democratic

Incumbent Democratic attorney general William Sorrell, the state's longest-serving attorney general (since 1997), did not run for reelection.

=== Democratic primary ===
==== Candidates ====
- T.J. Donovan, Chittenden County state's attorney
- H. Brooke Paige, businessman, perennial candidate (also ran for governor)

==== Results ====
Democratic primary results
Party	Candidate	Votes	%
Democratic	T.J. Donovan	49,017	67.0
Democratic	H. Brooke Paige	11,917	16.3
Democratic	Write-ins	214	0.0
Total votes		61,148	100%

=== Republican primary ===
Deborah Bucknam, a private practice attorney, was unopposed in the Republican primary.

==== Results ====
Republican primary results
Party	Candidate	Votes	%
Republican	Deborah Bucknam	31,173	67.2
Republican	Write-ins	1,477	3.0
Total votes		32,650	100%

=== Liberty Union nomination ===
Rosemarie Jackowski, journalist, teacher, activist, nominee for attorney general in 2014, and 2012, ran unopposed for the Liberty Union State Committee's nomination for attorney general.

=== General election ===
==== Candidates ====
- Deborah Bucknam (R)
- T.J. Donovan (D)
- Rosemarie Jackowski (LU)

==== Polling ====
Poll source	Date(s) administered	Sample size	Margin of error	T.J. Donovan (D)	Deborah Bucknam (R)	Rosemarie Jackowski (LU)	Other	Undecided
Castleton Polling Institute	?	579	± 3.9%	54%	12%	3%	8%	21%

==== Predictions ====
Source	Ranking
Governing	Likely D

==== Results ====
General election results
Party	Candidate	Votes	%
Democratic	T.J. Donovan	200,020	66.56
Republican	Deborah Bucknam	88,431	29.43
Liberty Union	Rosemarie Jackowski	11,844	4.0
Write-in	Write-ins	203	0.07
Total votes		300,498	100%

== Auditor of accounts ==
Vermont auditor election, 2016
- November 8, 2016
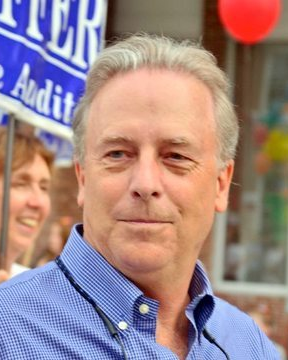

Nominee	Doug Hoffer	Dan Feliciano	Marina Brown
Party	Democratic	Republican	Liberty Union
Popular vote	159,695	113,231	15,099
Percentage	55.4%	39.28%	5.24%
- Hoffer: 40–50% 50–60% 60–70% 70–80% Feliciano: 40–50% 50–60% 60–70% No data/vote
Auditor before election
Doug Hoffer
Democratic
Elected Auditor
Doug Hoffer
Democratic

Incumbent Democratic/Progressive Auditor Doug Hoffer (since 2013) ran again for a third term.

=== Democratic primary ===
Incumbent Doug Hoffer was unopposed in the Democratic primary (and also ran in the Progressive primary).

==== Results ====
Democratic primary results
Party	Candidate	Votes	%
Democratic	Doug Hoffer	57,135	99.58
Democratic	Write-ins	241	0.01
Total votes		57,376	100%

=== Republican primary ===
Dan Feliciano, strategic policy consultant, Libertarian nominee for governor in 2014 and 2010, was unopposed in the Republican primary.

==== Results ====
Republican primary results
Party	Candidate	Votes	%
Republican	Dan Feliciano	29,753	98.29
Republican	Write-ins	517	1.71
Total votes		30,270	100%

=== Progressive primary ===
Incumbent Doug Hoffer was unopposed in the Progressive primary (and also ran in the Democratic primary).

==== Results ====
Progressive primary results
Party	Candidate	Votes	%
Progressive	Doug Hoffer (write-in)	220	80.88
Progressive	Write-ins (other)	52	19.12
Total votes		272	100%

=== Liberty Union nomination ===
Marina Brown, nominee for lieutenant governor in 2014, ran unopposed for the Liberty Union State Committee's nomination for auditor.

=== General election ===
==== Candidates ====
- Marina Brown (LU)
- Dan Feliciano (R)
- Doug Hoffer (D/P)

==== Results ====
General election results
Party	Candidate	Votes	%
Democratic	Doug Hoffer (incumbent)	159,695	55.4
Republican	Dan Feliciano	113,231	39.28
Liberty Union	Marina Brown	15,099	5.24
Write-in	Write-ins	228	0.07
Total votes		288,253	100%

== State legislature ==
All 30 seats in the Vermont Senate and all 150 seats of the Vermont House of Representatives were up for election. The balance of political power before the elections for each chamber was:

=== Senate ===
Party	# of seats
Democratic	19
Republican	9
Progressive	2
Total	30

=== House of Representatives ===
Party	# of seats
Democratic	85
Republican	53
Progressive	6
Independent	6
Total	150

The results of the elections for both chambers were:

=== Senate ===
Party	# of seats
Democratic	21
Republican	7
Progressive	2
Total	30

=== House of Representatives ===
Party	# of seats
Democratic	83
Republican	53
Progressive	7
Independent	7
Total	150
