= 2018 Vermont elections =

A general election was held in the U.S. state of Vermont on November 6, 2018. All of Vermont's executive officers were up for election, as well as Vermont's Class I Senate seat and at-large seat in the United States House of Representatives. Primary elections were held on August 14, 2018.

== United States Senate ==
Independent incumbent Bernie Sanders was elected to a third term.

== United States House of Representatives ==
Democratic incumbent Peter Welch was elected to a seventh term.

== Governor ==
Incumbent Republican Phil Scott was elected to a second term.

== Lieutenant governor ==
Vermont lieutenant gubernatorial election, 2018
- November 6, 2018
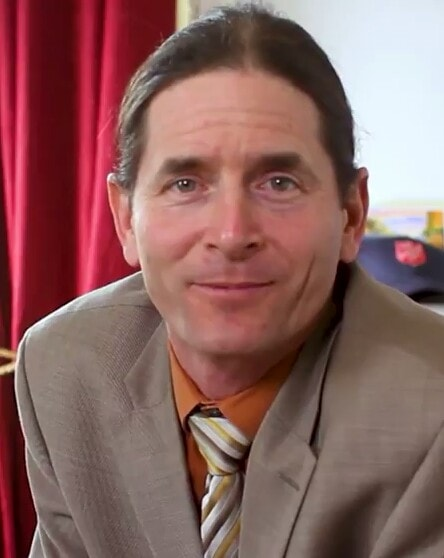

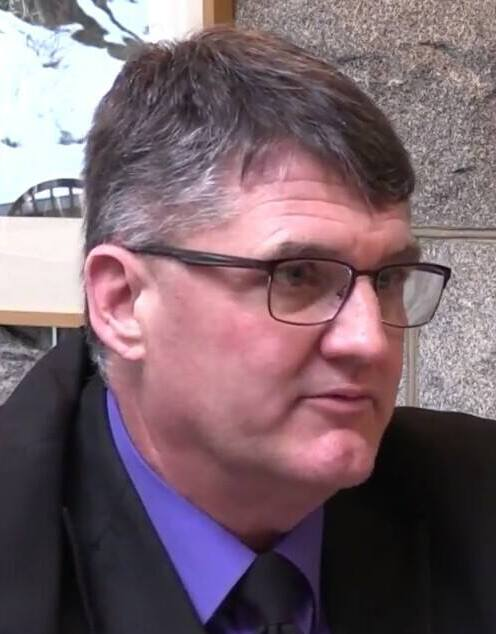
Nominee	Dave Zuckerman	Donald H. Turner Jr.
Party	Progressive	Republican
Alliance	Democratic	—
Popular vote	158,530	108,395
Percentage	57.12%	39.06%
- Zuckerman: 40–50% 50–60% 60–70% 70–80% 80–90% Turner: 40–50% 50–60% 60–70% 70–80% No data
Lieutenant Governor before election
Dave Zuckerman
Democratic/Progressive
Elected Lieutenant Governor
Dave Zuckerman
Democratic/Progressive

Incumbent Progressive/Democratic lieutenant governor Dave Zuckerman (since 2017) was elected to a second term.

=== Democratic primary ===
Zuckerman was unopposed in the Democratic primary.

==== Results ====
Democratic primary results
Party	Candidate	Votes	%
Democratic	Dave Zuckerman (incumbent)	59,131	98.0
Democratic	Write-ins	1,204	2.0
Democratic	Blank/overvotes	8,844	
Total votes		60,335	100%

=== Republican primary ===
House Republican Minority Leader Don H. Turner Jr. ran uncontested in the Republican primary.

==== Results ====
Republican primary results
Party	Candidate	Votes	%
Republican	Don Turner Jr.	28,195	97.8
Republican	Write-ins	624	2.2
Republican	Blank/overvotes	7,716	
Total votes		28,819	100%

=== Progressive primary ===
Zuckerman also again ran as a write-in candidate in the Progressive primary and was unopposed.

==== Results ====
Progressive primary results
Party	Candidate	Votes	%
Progressive	Dave Zuckerman (incumbent) (write-in)	390	78.5
Progressive	Write-ins (other)	107	21.5
Progressive	Blank/overvotes	146	
Total votes		497	100%

=== Liberty Union nomination ===
Murray Ngoima, candidate for Treasurer in 2010, 2014, and 2016, ran unopposed for the Liberty Union State Committee's nomination for lieutenant governor.

=== General election ===
==== Polling ====
Poll source	Date(s) administered	Sample size	Margin of error	David Zuckerman (P/D)	Don Turner (R)	Other	Undecided
Gravis Marketing	October 30 – November 1, 2018	885	± 3.3%	53%	38%	–	9%

==== Results ====
Vermont lieutenant gubernatorial election, 2018
Party	Candidate	Votes	%
Progressive/Democratic	Dave Zuckerman	158,530	57.12
Republican	Don Turner Jr.	108,395	39.06
Liberty Union	Murray Ngoima	4,108	1.52
Write-in	Write-ins	240	0.09
Total votes		271,295	100%
N/A	Blank votes	6,901	
N/A	Over votes	34	

== Secretary of state ==
Vermont secretary of state election, 2018
- November 6, 2018
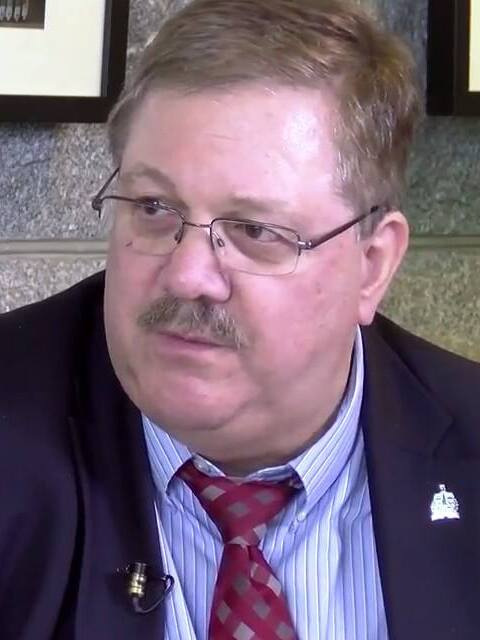

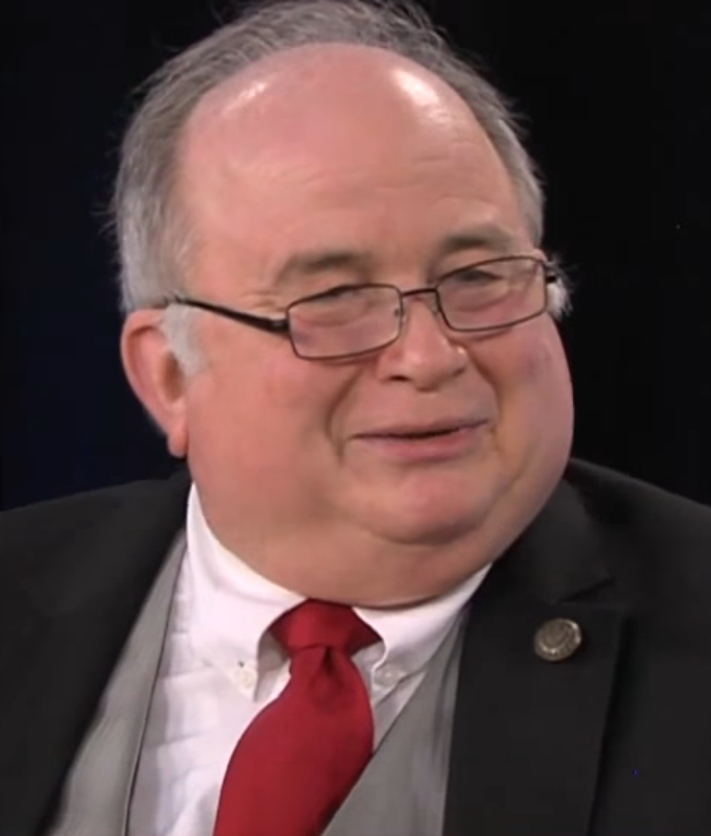
Nominee	Jim Condos	H. Brooke Paige
Party	Democratic	Republican
Popular vote	178,863	79,035
Percentage	66.81%	29.52%
- Condos: 40–50% 50–60% 60–70% 70–80% 80–90% Paige: 40–50% 50–60% 60–70% No data
Secretary of State before election
Jim Condos
Democratic
Elected Secretary of State
Jim Condos
Democratic

Incumbent Democratic secretary of state Jim Condos (since 2011) was elected to a fifth term.

=== Democratic primary ===
Condos was unopposed in the Democratic primary.

==== Results ====
Democratic primary results
Party	Candidate	Votes	%
Democratic	Jim Condos (incumbent)	59,040	99.6
Democratic	Write-ins	221	0.4
Democratic	Blank/overvotes	10,738	
Total votes		59,261	100

=== Republican primary ===
H. Brooke Paige, a perennial candidate, was unopposed in the Republican primary. Paige also ran in and won the Republican primary for U.S. Senate, U.S. House, attorney general, treasurer and auditor of accounts.

==== Results ====
Republican primary results
Party	Candidate	Votes	%
Republican	H. Brooke Paige	18,293	92.4
Republican	Write-ins	1,494	7.6
Republican	Blank/overvotes	17,200	
Total votes		19,787	100

=== Liberty Union nomination ===
Mary Alice Herbert, candidate for Secretary of State in 2016, ran unopposed for the Liberty Union State Committee's nomination for secretary of state.

=== General election ===
==== Predictions ====
Source	Ranking	As of
Governing	Safe D	October 11, 2018

==== Results ====
Vermont Secretary of State election, 2018
Party	Candidate	Votes	%
Democratic	Jim Condos (incumbent)	178,863	66.81
Republican	H. Brooke Paige	79,035	29.52
Liberty Union	Mary Alice Herbert	9,706	3.63
Write-in	Write-ins	108	0.04
Total votes		267,712	100
N/A	Blank votes	10,455	
N/A	Over votes	63	

== State Treasurer ==
Vermont state treasurer election, 2018
- November 6, 2018
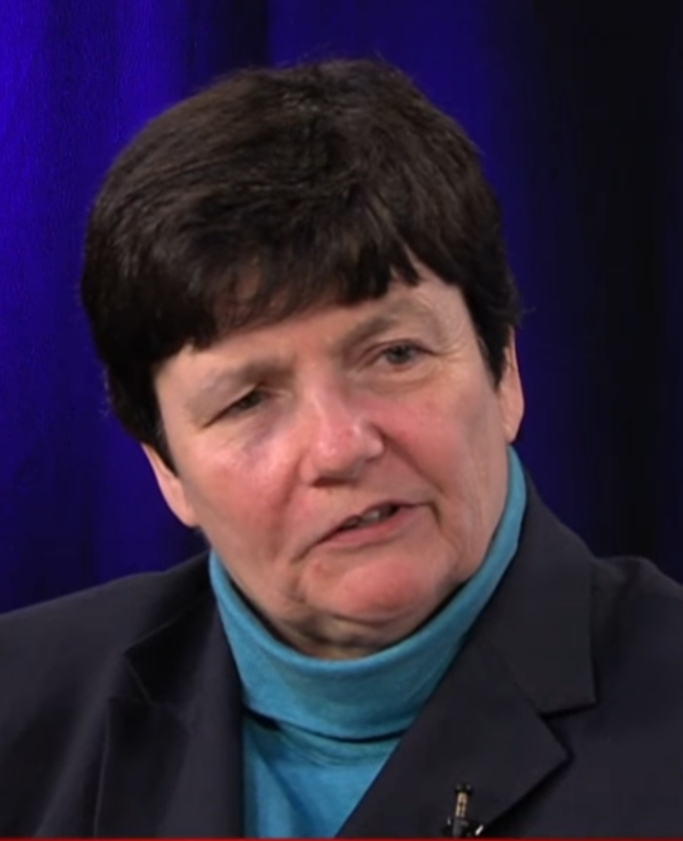

Nominee	Beth Pearce	Rick Morton
Party	Democratic	Republican
Popular vote	179,451	85,824
Percentage	67.6%	32.33%
- Pearce: 50–60% 60–70% 70–80% 80–90% Morton: 50–60% 60–70% Tie: 40–50% No data
Treasurer before election
Beth Pearce
Democratic
Elected Treasurer
Beth Pearce
Democratic

Incumbent Democratic treasurer Beth Pearce (since 2011) was elected to a fifth term.

=== Democratic primary ===
Pearce was unopposed in the Democratic primary.

==== Results ====
Democratic primary results
Party	Candidate	Votes	%
Democratic	Beth Pearce (incumbent)	58,379	99.5
Democratic	Write-ins	270	0.5
Democratic	Blank/overvotes	11,358	
Total votes		58,649	100%

=== Republican primary ===
H. Brooke Paige, a perennial candidate, was unopposed in the Republican primary. Paige also ran in and won the Republican primary for U.S. Senate, U.S. House, attorney general, secretary of state and state auditor of accounts.

==== Results ====
Republican primary results
Party	Candidate	Votes	%
Republican	H. Brooke Paige	20,313	94.3
Republican	Beth Pearce (incumbent) (write-in)	953	4.4
Republican	Write-ins (other)	280	1.3
Republican	Blank/overvotes	15,441	
Total votes		21,546	100%

==== Post-primary ====
Paige withdrew on August 24, allowing the state Republican party to name a replacement. On August 29, the Vermont Republican Party selected Rick Morton, the current state party treasurer.

=== General election ===
Vermont Treasurer election, 2018
Party	Candidate	Votes	%
Democratic	Beth Pearce (incumbent)	179,451	67.6
Republican	Rick Morton	85,824	32.33
Write-in	Write-ins	161	0.06
Total votes		265,436	100
N/A	Blank votes	12,752	
N/A	Over votes	42	

== Attorney general ==
Incumbent Democratic attorney general T. J. Donovan (since 2017) was elected to a second term.

=== Democratic primary ===
Donovan was unopposed in the Democratic primary.

==== Results ====
Democratic primary results
Party	Candidate	Votes	%
Democratic	T.J. Donovan (incumbent)	58,714	99.4
Democratic	Write-ins	354	0.6
Democratic	Blank/overvotes	10,939	
Total votes		59,068	100%

=== Republican primary ===
H. Brooke Paige, a perennial candidate, was unopposed in the Republican primary. Paige also ran in and won the Republican primary for U.S. Senate, U.S. House, secretary of state, state treasurer and state auditor of accounts.

==== Results ====
Republican primary results
Party	Candidate	Votes	%
Republican	H. Brooke Paige	16,853	90.9
Republican	Write-ins	1,690	9.1
Republican	Blank/overvotes	18,444	
Total votes		18,543	100%

==== Post primary ====
Paige withdrew on August 24, allowing the state Republican party to name a replacement. On August 29, the Vermont Republican Party selected State Representative Janssen Willhoit (Caledonia-3) as their attorney general nominee.

=== Liberty Union nomination ===
Rosemarie Jackowski, candidate for attorney general in 2016, ran unopposed for the Liberty Union State Committee's nomination for attorney general.

=== General election ===
==== Predictions ====
Source	Ranking	As of
Governing	Safe D	October 26, 2018

==== Results ====
Vermont attorney general election, 2018
Party	Candidate	Votes	%
Democratic	T.J. Donovan (incumbent)	187,093	67.24
Republican	Janssen Willhoit	70,226	25.24
Liberty Union	Rosemarie Jackowski	9,536	3.43
	Write-ins	166	0.06
	Overvotes	96	N/A
	Blank votes	11,113	N/A
Total votes		278,230	

== Auditor of Accounts ==
Incumbent Democratic/Progressive Auditor Doug Hoffer (since 2013) was elected to a fourth term.

=== Democratic primary ===
Hoffer was unopposed in the Democratic primary.

==== Results ====
Democratic primary results
Party	Candidate	Votes	%
Democratic	Doug Hoffer (incumbent)	55,946	99.7
Democratic	Write-ins	182	0.3
Democratic	Blank/overvotes	13,879	
Total votes		56,128	100%

=== Republican primary ===
H. Brooke Paige, a perennial candidate, was unopposed in the Republican primary. Paige also ran in and won the Republican primary for U.S. Senate, U.S. House, attorney general, secretary of state and state treasurer.

==== Results ====
Republican primary results
Party	Candidate	Votes	%
Republican	H. Brooke Paige	17,405	93.8
Republican	Write-ins	1,144	6.2
Republican	Blank/overvotes	18,438	
Total votes		18,549	100%

==== Post-primary ====
Paige withdrew on August 24, allowing the state Republican party to name a replacement. On August 29, the Vermont Republican Party selected Rick Kenyon, a tax preparer from Brattleboro.

=== Progressive primary ===
Hoffer also again ran as a write-in candidate in the Progressive primary and was unopposed.

==== Results ====
Progressive primary results
Party	Candidate	Votes	%
Progressive	Doug Hoffer (incumbent) (write-in)	336	79.6
Progressive	Write-ins (other)	86	20.4
Progressive	Blank/overvotes	222	
Total votes		422	100%

=== Liberty Union nomination ===
Marina Brown, candidate for Auditor in 2016, ran unopposed for the Liberty Union State Committee's nomination for Auditor.

=== General election ===
Vermont Auditor of Accounts election, 2018
Party	Candidate	Votes	%
Democratic	Doug Hoffer (incumbent) (Note: Listed on the ballot as '"Democratic/Progressive")	160,291	57.61
Republican	Rick Kenyon	88,021	31.64
Liberty Union	Marina Brown	10,947	3.93
	Write-ins	116	0.04
	Overvotes	404	N/A
	Blank votes	18,451	N/A
Total votes		278,230	

== State legislature ==
All 30 seats in the Vermont Senate and all 150 seats of the Vermont House of Representatives were up for election. The balance of political power before the elections for each chamber was:

=== Senate ===
Party	# of seats
Democratic	21
Republican	7
Progressive	2
Total	30

=== House of Representatives ===
Party	# of seats
Democratic	83
Republican	53
Progressive	7
Independent	7
Total	150

And the results of the elections for both chambers was:

Main article: 2018 Vermont Senate election

Party	# of seats
Democratic	22
Republican	6
Progressive	2
Total	30

Main article: 2018 Vermont House of Representatives election

Party	# of seats
Democratic	95
Republican	43
Progressive	7
Independent	5
Total	150

== County offices ==
All county level offices were up for election. The balance of political power before and after the elections for each office was:

=== Before ===
==== Addison County ====
Office	Name	Party
States Attorney	David R. Fenster	Republican
Assistant Judge	Alice George	Republican
Assistant Judge	Irene Poole	Democratic
Probate Judge	Eleanor Smith	Democratic
Sheriff	Donald M. Keeler	Republican
High Bailiff	Ron Holmes	Democratic

=== After ===
==== Addison County ====
Office	Name	Party
States Attorney	Dennis Wygmans	Democratic
Assistant Judge	Patricia Ross	Democratic
Assistant Judge	Jacqueline Mclean	Democratic
Probate Judge	Eleanor Smith	Democratic
Sheriff	Peter Dorey Newton	Democratic
High Bailiff	Charles S. Clark Jr.	Rep/Dem

==== Bennington County ====
Office	Name	Party
States Attorney	Erica Albin Marthage	Democratic
Assistant Judge	James H. Colvin	Democratic
Assistant Judge	Wesley L. Mook	Democratic
Probate Judge	D. Justine Scanlon	Democratic
Sheriff	Chad D. Schmidt	Republican
High Bailiff	Frederick C. Gilbar	Democratic

==== Bennington County ====
Office	Name	Party
States Attorney	Erica Albin Marthage	Democratic
Assistant Judge	James H. Colvin	Democratic
Assistant Judge	Wesley L. Mook	Democratic
Probate Judge	D. Justine Scanlon	Democratic
Sheriff	Chad D. Schmidt	Dem/Rep
High Bailiff	Frederick C. Gilbar	Democratic

==== Caledonia County ====
Office	Name	Party
States Attorney	Lisa A. Warren	Republican
Assistant Judge	John S. Hall	Republican
Assistant Judge	Roy C. Vance	Dem/Rep
Probate Judge	Ernest Tobias Balivet	Dem/Rep
Sheriff	Dean Shatney	Dem/Rep
High Bailiff	James A. Hemond	Rep/Dem

==== Caledonia County ====
Office	Name	Party
States Attorney	Lisa A. Warren	Dem/Rep
Assistant Judge	John S. Hall	Rep/Dem
Assistant Judge	Roy C. Vance	Dem/Rep
Probate Judge	William W. Cobb	Democratic
Sheriff	Dean Shatney	Dem/Rep
High Bailiff	Stephen Bunnell	Rep/Dem

==== Chittenden County ====
Office	Name	Party
States Attorney	T.J. Donovan	Democratic
Assistant Judge	Charles Delaney	Prog/Rep/Dem
Assistant Judge	Connie Cain Ramsey	Democratic
Probate Judge	Susan L. Flower	Dem/Rep
Sheriff	Kevin M. McLaughlin	Dem/Rep
High Bailiff	Daniel L. Gamelin	Dem/Prog/Rep

==== Chittenden County ====
Office	Name	Party
States Attorney	Sarah F. George	Democratic
Assistant Judge	Suzanne Brown	Dem/Rep
Assistant Judge	Connie Cain Ramsey	Democratic
Probate Judge	Gregory J. Glennon	Democratic
Sheriff	Kevin M. McLaughlin	Dem/Rep
High Bailiff	Daniel L. Gamelin	Dem/Prog/Rep

==== Essex County ====
Office	Name	Party
States Attorney	Vincent Illuzzi	Republican
Assistant Judge	Calvin Colby	Republican
Assistant Judge	Allen D. Hodgdon	Republican
Probate Judge	Allen D. Hodgdon	Republican
Sheriff	Trevor Colby	Republican
High Bailiff	Vacant	N/A

==== Essex County ====
Office	Name	Party
States Attorney	Vincent Illuzzi	Prog/Rep/Dem/Lib
Assistant Judge	Calvin Colby	Republican
Assistant Judge	Allen D. Hodgdon	Republican
Probate Judge	Allen D. Hodgdon	Republican
Sheriff	Trevor Colby	Rep/Prog
High Bailiff	Vacant	N/A

==== Franklin County ====
Office	Name	Party
States Attorney	James A. Hughes	Democratic
Assistant Judge	Kelly Gosselin	Democratic
Assistant Judge	Robert Johnson	Republican
Probate Judge	Larry Bruce	Dem/Rep
Sheriff	Robert W. Norris	Dem/Rep
High Bailiff	Roberta Allard	Democratic

==== Franklin County ====
Office	Name	Party
States Attorney	James A. Hughes	Democratic
Assistant Judge	Kelly Gosselin	Democratic
Assistant Judge	Robert Johnson	Dem/Rep
Probate Judge	Vaughn Comeau	Republican
Sheriff	Roger Langevin	Democratic
High Bailiff	Roberta Allard	Democratic

==== Grand Isle County ====
Office	Name	Party
States Attorney	Douglas Disabito	Democratic
Assistant Judge	Sherri Potvin	Democratic
Assistant Judge	Joanne R. Batchelder	Republican
Probate Judge	George Ned Spear	Republican
Sheriff	Ray C. Allen	Dem/Rep
High Bailiff	Kevin G. Winch	Independent

==== Grand Isle County ====
Office	Name	Party
States Attorney	Douglas Disabito	Democratic
Assistant Judge	Sherri Potvin	Democratic
Assistant Judge	Joanne R. Batchelder	Rep/Dem
Probate Judge	George Ned Spear	Democratic
Sheriff	Ray C. Allen	Dem/Prog/Rep
High Bailiff	Kevin G. Winch	Independent

==== Lamoille County ====
Office	Name	Party
States Attorney	Paul Finnerty	Dem/Rep
Assistant Judge	Joel W. Page	Democratic
Assistant Judge	Karen Bradley	Democratic
Probate Judge	James Dean R. Mahoney	Independent
Sheriff	Roger M. Marcoux Jr.	Republican
High Bailiff	Eben E. Merrill	Republican

==== Lamoille County ====
Office	Name	Party
States Attorney	Todd A. Shove	Democratic
Assistant Judge	Joel W. Page	Democratic
Assistant Judge	Madeline M. Motta	Democratic
Probate Judge	James Dean R. Mahoney	Independent
Sheriff	Roger M. Marcoux Jr.	Dem/Rep
High Bailiff	Claude D. Ammons Jr.	Democratic

==== Orange County ====
Office	Name	Party
States Attorney	William J. Porter	Republican
Assistant Judge	Joyce McKeeman	Democratic
Assistant Judge	Victoria Weiss	Democratic
Probate Judge	Bernard Lewis	Republican
Sheriff	Bill Bohnyak	Rep/Dem
High Bailiff	Michael P. Welch	Republican

==== Orange County ====
Office	Name	Party
States Attorney	William J. Porter	Democratic
Assistant Judge	Joyce McKeeman	Democratic
Assistant Judge	Victoria Weiss	Democratic
Probate Judge	Kathryn C. A. Kennedy	Democratic
Sheriff	Bill Bohnyak	Democratic
High Bailiff	George Contois	Democratic

==== Orleans County ====
Office	Name	Party
States Attorney	Jennifer Barrett	Republican
Assistant Judge	Benjamin Batchelder	Republican
Assistant Judge	Curtis A. Hardy	Rep/Dem
Probate Judge	John P. Monette	Independent
Sheriff	Jennifer Harlow	Democrat
High Bailiff	Philip Brooks	Republican

==== Orleans County ====
Office	Name	Party
States Attorney	Jennifer Barrett	Dem/Rep
Assistant Judge	Benjamin Batchelder	Dem/Rep
Assistant Judge	Curtis A. Hardy	Democratic
Probate Judge	Robert B. Chimileski	Independent
Sheriff	Jennifer Harlow	Democrat
High Bailiff	Philip Brooks	Republican

==== Rutland County ====
Office	Name	Party
States Attorney	Rose Kennedy	Democratic
Assistant Judge	Jean H. Coloutti	Republican
Assistant Judge	David W. Lewis	Republican
Probate Judge	Kevin P. Candon	Democratic
Sheriff	Stephen P. Benard Sr.	Dem/Rep
High Bailiff	Penelope Garofano	Republican

==== Rutland County ====
Office	Name	Party
States Attorney	Rose Kennedy	Democratic
Assistant Judge	Jean H. Coloutti	Dem/Rep
Assistant Judge	David W. Lewis	Dem/Rep
Probate Judge	Karl C. Anderson	Republican
Sheriff	Stephen P. Benard Sr.	Dem/Rep
High Bailiff	David Fox	Democratic

==== Washington County ====
Office	Name	Party
States Attorney	Scott R. Williams	Democratic
Assistant Judge	Miriam Conlon	Democratic
Assistant Judge	Otto Kinzel Trautz	Dem/Rep
Probate Judge	Jeffrey P. Kilgore	Democratic
Sheriff	W. Samuel Hill	Dem/Rep
High Bailiff	Marc Poulin	Democratic

==== Washington County ====
Office	Name	Party
States Attorney	Rory T. Thibault	Democratic
Assistant Judge	Miriam Conlon	Democratic
Assistant Judge	Otto Kinzel Trautz	Dem/Rep
Probate Judge	Jeffrey P. Kilgore	Democratic
Sheriff	W. Samuel Hill	Dem/Rep
High Bailiff	Marc Poulin	Democratic

==== Windham County ====
Office	Name	Party
States Attorney	Tracy Kelly Shriver	Democratic
Assistant Judge	Patricia W. Duff	Democratic
Assistant Judge	Paul Kane	Democratic
Probate Judge	Robert M. Pu	Democratic
Sheriff	Keith D. Clark	Democratic
High Bailiff	Stefan A. Golec	Republican

==== Windham County ====
Office	Name	Party
States Attorney	Tracy Kelly Shriver	Democratic
Assistant Judge	Patricia W. Duff	Democratic
Assistant Judge	Lamont Barnett	Democratic
Probate Judge	Jodi P. French	Democratic
Sheriff	Keith D. Clark	Democratic
High Bailiff	Mark Anderson	Democratic

==== Windsor County ====
Office	Name	Party
States Attorney	Michael Kainen	Dem/Rep
Assistant Judge	Jack W. Anderson	Democratic
Assistant Judge	Ellen Terie	Democratic
Probate Judge	Joanne Ertel	Democratic
Sheriff	Michael Chamberlain	Dem/Rep
High Bailiff	Michael E. Manley	Democratic

==== Windsor County ====
Office	Name	Party
States Attorney	David Cahill	Democratic
Assistant Judge	Jack W. Anderson	Democratic
Assistant Judge	Eleen Terie	Democratic
Probate Judge	Frederick M. Glover	Democratic
Sheriff	Michael Chamberlain	Democratic
High Bailiff	Michael E. Manley	Democratic
