= 2018 United States House of Representatives election in Vermont =

2018 United States House of Representatives election in Vermont's at-large district
- November 6, 2018
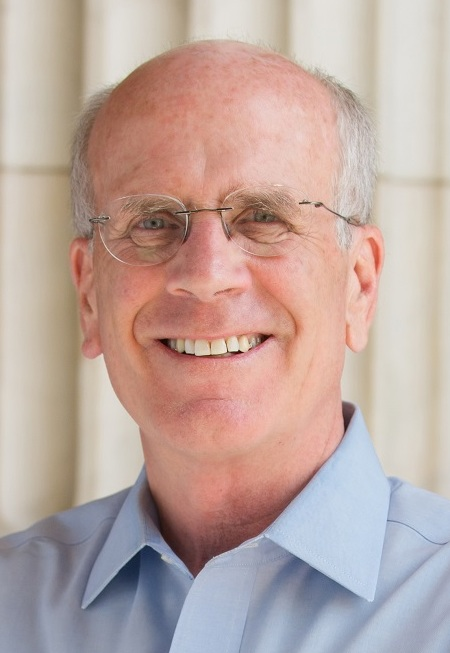

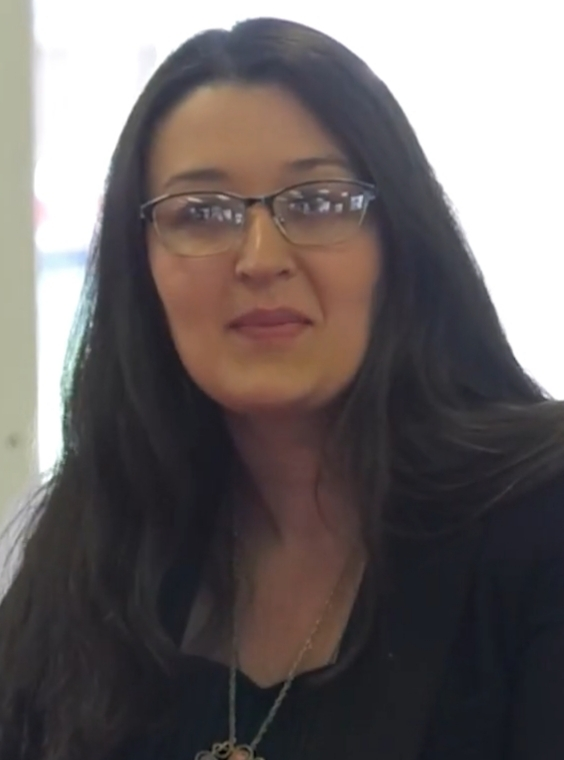
Nominee	Peter Welch	Anya Tynio
Party	Democratic	Republican
Popular vote	188,547	70,705
Percentage	69.20%	25.95%
- Welch: 40–50% 50–60% 60–70% 70–80% 80–90% >90% Tynio: 40–50% 50–60%
U.S. Representative before election
Peter Welch
Democratic
Elected U.S. Representative
Peter Welch
Democratic

The 2018 United States House of Representatives election in Vermont was held on November 6, 2018, to elect the U.S. representative from the state of Vermont from Vermont's at-large congressional district. The election coincided with other elections to the House of Representatives, elections to the United States Senate and various state and local elections. The primary elections were held on August 14. Peter Welch, a Democrat won reelection to a seventh term, defeating Republican Anya Tynio.

== Democratic primary ==
=== Candidates ===
==== Declared ====
- Daniel Freilich, candidate for U.S. Senate in 2010, Navy medical doctor, physician at the VA Medical Center
- Peter Welch, incumbent U.S. representative

==== Withdrawn ====
- Ben Mitchell, Liberty Union nominee for U.S. Senate in 2004, governor of Vermont in 2010 and for lieutenant governor of Vermont in 2012 (Withdrew, endorsed Freilich)

=== Debates & forums ===
- CCTV Channel 17 Forum - Democratic Primary for Representative to Congress 8/7/2018
- Vermont Public Radio - Campaign 2018: A Debate With The Democratic Candidates For U.S. House 8/9/2018

=== Results ===
Results by county: Welch—80–90% Welch—70–80%

Democratic primary results
Party	Candidate	Votes	%
Democratic	Peter Welch (incumbent)	55,939	83.94
Democratic	Daniel Freilich	7,881	11.83
Democratic	Benjamin Mitchell (withdrawn)	2,676	4.02
Democratic	Write-ins	142	0.21
Total votes		66,638	100.0
N/A	Spoiled votes	52	
N/A	Blank votes	2,927	

== Republican primary ==
=== Candidates ===
==== Declared ====
- H. Brooke Paige, former CEO of Remmington News Service, perennial candidate
- Anya Tynio, sales representative for the Newport Daily Express

=== Debates & forums ===
- CCTV Channel 17 Republican Primary Forum for Representative to Congress 7/23/2018

=== Results ===
Results by county: Paige—60–70% Paige—50–60% Paige—40–50% Tynio—40–50%

Republican primary results
Party	Candidate	Votes	%
Republican	H. Brooke Paige	14,721	59.89
Republican	Anya Tynio	8,485	34.52
Republican	Peter Welch (write-in)	923	3.76
Republican	Write-ins (other)	450	1.83
Total votes		24,579	100.0
N/A	Spoiled votes	97	
N/A	Blank votes	11,499	

=== Post-primary ===
H. Brooke Paige, who also won the Republican nominations for U.S. Senate, state attorney general, state secretary of state, state treasurer and state auditor, withdrew from all but the secretary of state race on August 24 in order to allow the Vermont Republican State Committee to name replacement candidates. Anya Tynio, who came in second place in the primary, was nominated to be the Republican nominee.

== Progressive primary ==
=== Candidates ===
==== Write-in ====
- Daniel Freilich, candidate for U.S. Senate in 2010, Navy medical doctor, physician at the VA Medical Center (also running in Democratic primary)

=== Debates & forums ===
- BCTV Meet The Candidates forum for Representative to US House 7/10/2018

=== Results ===
Progressive primary results
Party	Candidate	Votes	%
Progressive	Peter Welch (write-in)	237	62.04
Progressive	Daniel Freilich (write-in)	73	19.11
Progressive	Write-ins (other)	72	18.85
Total votes		643	100.0
N/A	Spoiled votes	1	
N/A	Blank votes	260	

== Liberty Union/Socialist nomination ==
The Liberty Union Party serves as the Vermont affiliate of the Socialist Party for federal-level elections.

=== Candidates ===
==== Declared ====
- Laura S. Potter

==== Withdrawn ====
- Ben Mitchell, Liberty Union nominee for U.S. Senate in 2004, governor of Vermont in 2010 and for lieutenant governor of Vermont in 2012 (also ran in Democratic primary before dropping out)

== United States Marijuana nomination ==
=== Candidates ===
==== Declared ====
- Cris Ericson, perennial candidate

== America First nomination ==
=== Candidates ===
==== Declared ====
- Paul Young (failed to appear on ballot)

== General election ==
=== Predictions ===
Source	Ranking	As of
The Cook Political Report	Safe D	November 5, 2018
Inside Elections	Safe D	November 5, 2018
Sabato's Crystal Ball	Safe D	November 5, 2018
RCP	Safe D	November 5, 2018
Daily Kos	Safe D	November 5, 2018
538	Safe D	November 7, 2018
CNN	Safe D	October 31, 2018
Politico	Safe D	November 2, 2018

=== Polling ===
Poll source	Date(s) administered	Sample size	Margin of error	Peter Welch (D)	Anya Tynio (R)	Other	Undecided
Gravis Marketing	October 30 – November 1, 2018	885	± 3.3%	66%	28%	–	6%
Braun Research	October 5–14, 2018	497	± 4.4%	55%	18%	7%	20%

=== Results ===
2018 Vermont's at-large congressional district election
Party	Candidate	Votes	%	±%
Democratic	Peter Welch (incumbent)	188,547	69.20%	−13.31%
Republican	Anya Tynio	70,705	25.95%	N/A
Marijuana	Cris Ericson	9,110	3.34%	N/A
Liberty Union	Laura Potter	3,924	1.44%	−7.74%
Write-in		165	0.07%	-0.39%
Total votes		272,451	100.0%	N/A
Democratic hold				

==== By county ====
By county

County	Peter Welch Democratic		Anya Tynio Republican		Various candidates Other parties	
County	#	%	#	%	#	%
Addison	12,269	71.3%	4,186	24.3%	746	4.3%
Bennington	9,723	66.5%	3,939	26.9%	957	6.6%
Caledonia	7,080	60.7%	4,054	34.7%	537	5.7%
Chittenden	57,238	75.8%	15,268	20.2%	2,997	4.0%
Essex	1,106	50.5%	958	43.8%	124	5.6%
Franklin	11,047	60.8%	6,251	34.4%	873	4.9%
Grand Isle	2,393	64.9%	1,141	31.0%	151	4.1%
Lamoille	8,079	71.2%	2,771	24.4%	490	4.3%
Orange	8,224	65.7%	3,614	28.9%	671	5.3%
Orleans	5,569	56.3%	3,850	38.9%	476	4.8%
Rutland	14,237	58.5%	8,841	36.3%	1,266	5.2%
Washington	19,767	72.6%	6,182	22.7%	1,281	4.7%
Windham	14,207	74.8%	3,623	19.1%	1,173	6.2%
Windsor	17,608	70.2%	6,027	24.0%	1,455	5.8%
Totals	188,547	69.2%	70,705	26.0%	13,199	4.8%
