= 2018 United States Senate election in Vermont =

- November 6, 2018
- Turnout: 55.57%
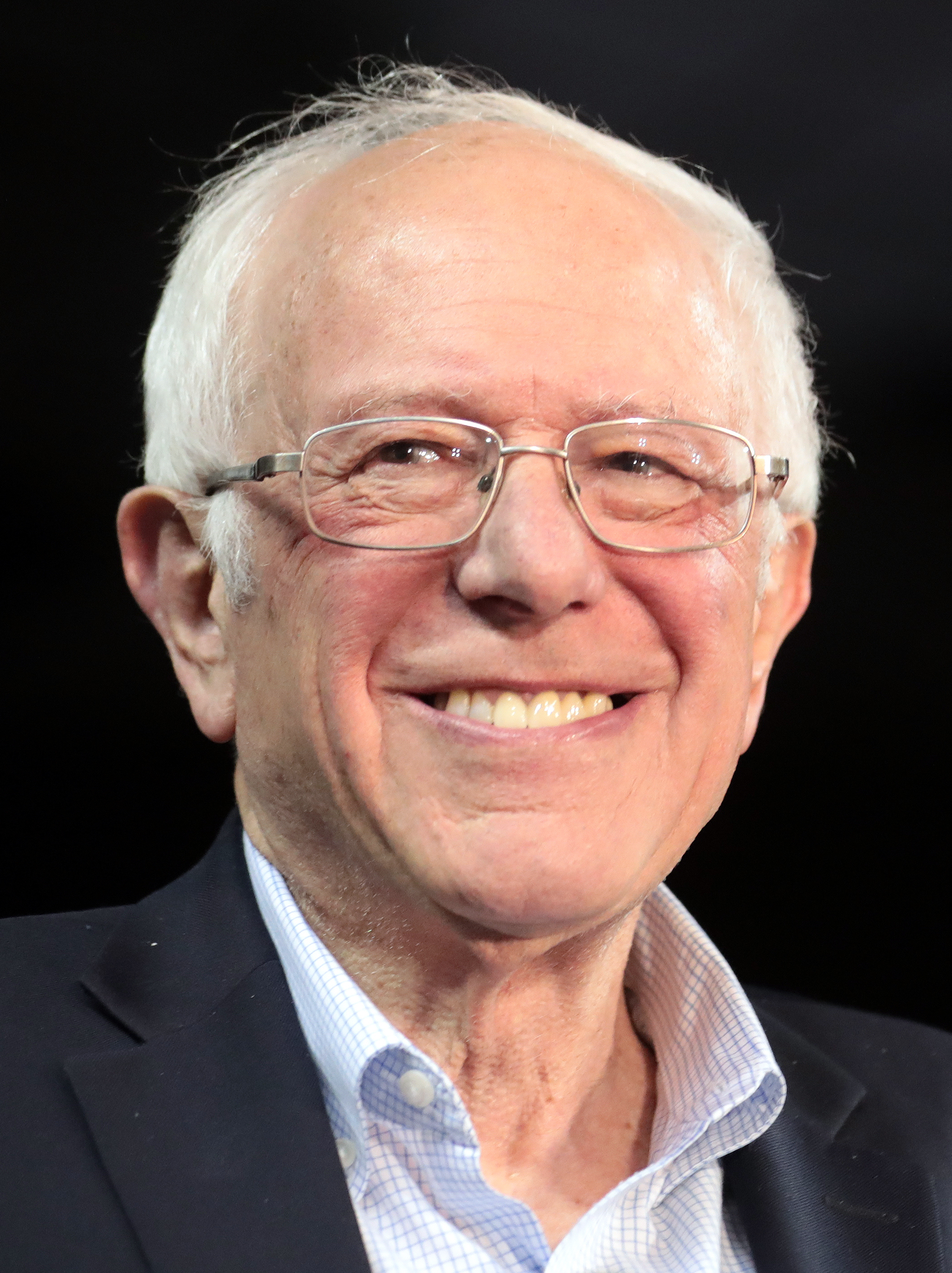

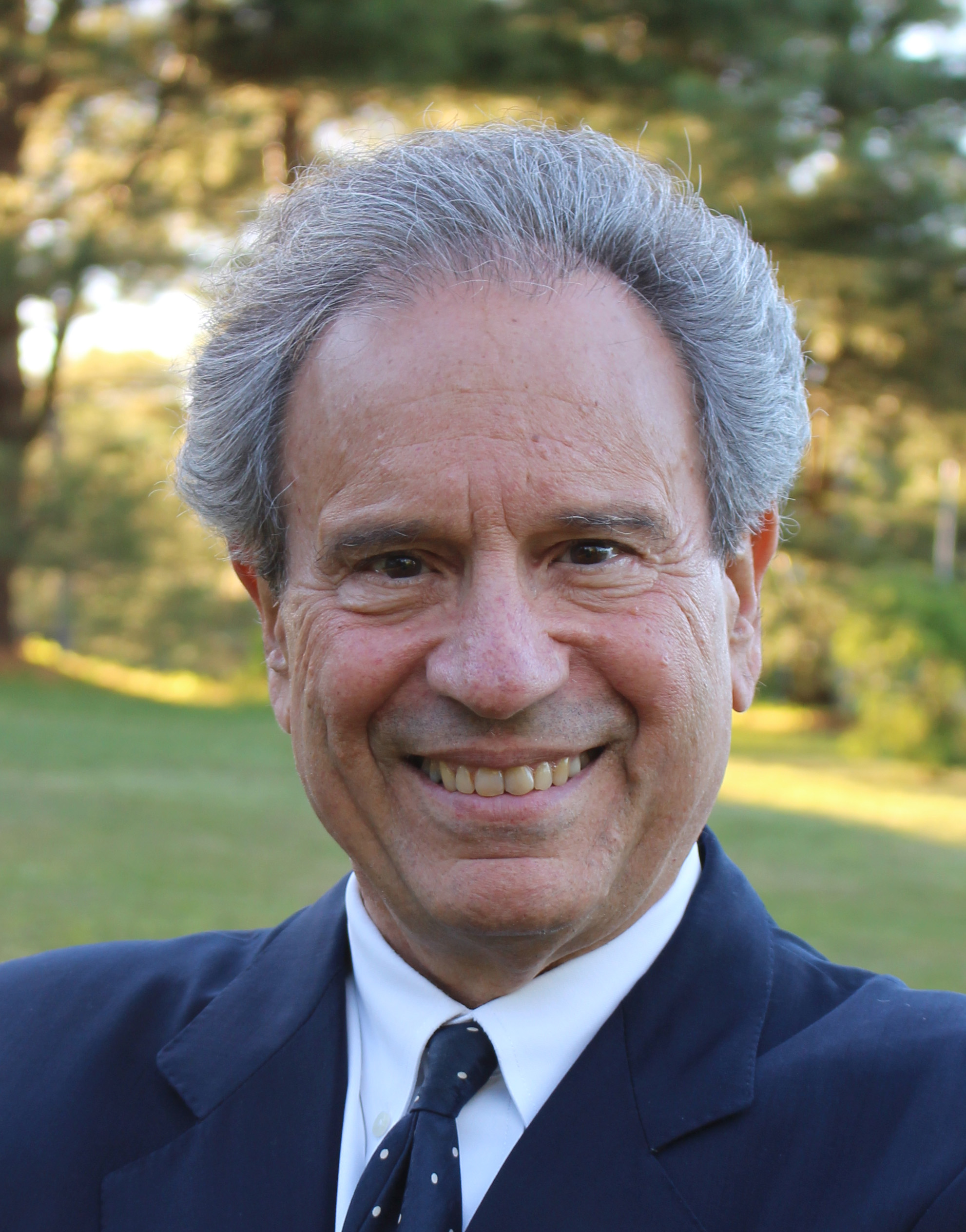
Nominee	Bernie Sanders	Lawrence Zupan
Party	Independent	Republican
Popular vote	183,649	74,815
Percentage	67.44%	27.47%
- Sanders: 40–50% 50–60% 60–70% 70–80% 80–90% Zupan: 40–50% 50–60% 60–70% Tie: 30–40%
U.S. Senator before election
Bernie Sanders
Independent
Elected U.S. Senator
Bernie Sanders
Independent

The 2018 United States Senate election in Vermont was held November 6, 2018, alongside a gubernatorial election, U.S. House election, and other state and local elections. Incumbent independent Senator Bernie Sanders won re-election to a third term, defeating Republican nominee Lawrence Zupan. The primaries were held on August 14. This was one of two independent-held Senate seats up for election in a state that Hillary Clinton won in the 2016 presidential election.

== Background ==
Two-term independent Senator Bernie Sanders was re-elected with 71% of the vote in 2012. Sanders, a candidate for president in the 2016 primary election and one of only three independent members of Congress, is a self-described democratic socialist.

Sanders had caucused with the Democratic Party since taking office in 2007, and was the chairman of the Budget Committee. He was 77 years old in 2018. Sanders ran for the 2016 Democratic presidential nomination. After failing to win the nomination, he announced that he would run for re-election for his Senate seat in 2018.

== Independents ==
=== Candidates ===
- Brad Peacock, farmer
- Bernie Sanders, incumbent U.S. senator (caucuses with Democrats)

=== Endorsements ===
Bernie Sanders

Organizations

- Democracy for America
- J Street
- MoveOn.org
- Our Revolution
- Rights and Democracy
- Sierra Club

== Democratic primary ==
=== Candidates ===
==== Nominee ====
- Bernie Sanders, incumbent U.S. senator (declined nomination)

==== Eliminated in primary ====
- Folasade Adeluola, activist

==== Not on ballot ====
- Jon Svitavsky, homelessness activist

==== Withdrawn ====
- Al Giordano, journalist

=== Results ===
Results by county Map legend: Sanders—≥90%; Sanders—80–90%

Democratic primary results
Party	Candidate	Votes	%
Democratic	Bernie Sanders (incumbent)	63,683	94.02%
Democratic	Folasade Adeluola	3,766	5.56%
Write-in		281	0.41%
Total votes		67,730	100.00%

== Republican primary ==
=== Candidates ===
==== Nominee ====
- Lawrence Zupan, real estate broker

==== Withdrew nomination ====
- H. Brooke Paige, former CEO of Remmington News Service

==== Eliminated in primary ====
- Rocky De La Fuente, businessman
- Jasdeep Pannu, attorney

==== Did not file ====
- John MacGovern, former Massachusetts state representative and nominee for the U.S. Senate in 2012
- Scott Milne, businessman, nominee for governor in 2014 and nominee for the U.S. Senate in 2016

=== Results ===
Results by county Map legend: Paige—50–60%; Paige—40–50%; Paige—30–40%; Zupan—30–40%; Zupan—40–50%; Zupan—50–60%; Zupan—60–70%

Republican primary results
Party	Candidate	Votes	%
Republican	H. Brooke Paige	9,805	37.47%
Republican	Lawrence Zupan	9,383	35.86%
Republican	Jasdeep Pannu	4,527	17.30%
Republican	Rocky De La Fuente	1,057	4.04%
Write-in		1,394	5.33%
Total votes		26,166	100.00%

=== Post-primary ===
H. Brooke Paige, who also won the Republican nominations for U.S. House, state Attorney General, state Secretary of State, state Treasurer, and state Auditor, withdrew from all but the secretary of state race on August 24, in order to allow the Vermont Republican Party to name replacement candidates. The Vermont Republican Party picked Lawrence Zupan, who came in second place in the primary, to be the Republican nominee.

== General election ==
=== Predictions ===
Source	Ranking	As of
CNN	Solid I	July 12, 2018
Fox News	Likely* I	July 9, 2018
RealClearPolitics	Safe I	June 6, 2018
The Cook Political Report	Solid I	October 11, 2017
Inside Elections	Solid I	September 29, 2017
Sabato's Crystal Ball	Safe I	September 27, 2017

*Highest rating given

=== Polling ===
Poll source	Date(s) administered	Sample size	Margin of error	Bernie Sanders (I)	Lawrence Zupan (R)	Other	Undecided
Gravis Marketing	October 30 – November 1, 2018	885	± 3.3%	66%	30%	–	4%
Braun Research	October 5–14, 2018	495	± 4.4%	60%	19%	7%	16%
Tulchin Research (D-Vermont Democratic Party)	September 23–26, 2018	406	± 4.9%	75%	20%	–	–

=== Results ===

Sanders won re-election with 67.4% of the vote against eight other candidates.

United States Senate election in Vermont, 2018
Party	Candidate	Votes	%	±%
Independent	Bernie Sanders (incumbent)	183,649	67.44%	−3.56%
Republican	Lawrence Zupan	74,815	27.47%	+2.57%
Independent	Brad J. Peacock	3,665	1.35%	N/A
Independent	Russell Beste	2,763	1.02%	N/A
Independent	Edward S. Gilbert, Jr.	2,244	0.82%	N/A
Independent	Folasade Adeluola	1,979	0.73%	N/A
Liberty Union	Reid Kane	1,171	0.43%	−0.43%
Independent	Jon Svitavsky	1,130	0.42%	N/A
Independent	Bruce Busa	914	0.34%	N/A
Write-in		294	0.11%	N/A
Total votes		272,330	100.00%	N/A
Independent hold				

==== By county ====
By county

County	Bernie Sanders Independent		Lawrence Zupan Republican		Various candidates Other parties	
County	#	%	#	%	#	%
Addison	11,965	69.56%	4,439	25.81%	798	4.63%
Bennington	8,971	60.89%	3,910	26.54%	1,851	12.57%
Caledonia	6,803	58.31%	4,296	36.82%	567	4.87%
Chittenden	55,669	73.74%	16,441	21.78%	3,380	4.48%
Essex	1,059	48.67%	976	44.85%	141	6.48%
Franklin	10,492	57.6%	6,782	37.24%	940	5.16%
Grand Isle	2,307	62.61%	1,229	33.35%	149	4.04%
Lamoille	7,989	70.36%	2,931	25.81%	435	3.83%
Orange	8,099	64.6%	3,790	30.23%	649	5.17%
Orleans	5,571	56.41%	3,853	39.01%	453	4.58%
Rutland	13,587	55.78%	9,576	39.31%	1,196	4.91%
Washington	19,395	71.14%	6,517	23.9%	1,353	4.96%
Windham	14,386	75.66%	3,673	19.32%	955	5.02%
Windsor	17,356	69.28%	6,402	25.55%	1,294	5.17%
Totals	183,649	67.36%	74,815	27.44%	14,160	5.2%

== See also ==
- 2018 United States Senate elections
- 2018 Vermont gubernatorial election
