= Jason Gibbs =

American politician

Jason Gibbs (born August 26, 1976) is an American politician from the U.S. state of Vermont. In 2010 he successfully sought the Republican nomination for Vermont Secretary of State before being defeated in the general election by Democrat Jim Condos. Gibbs is a native of Forest Dale, Vermont.

Gibbs formerly served as Vermont's Commissioner of Forest, Parks and Recreation in the Administration of Governor Jim Douglas. Before being appointed Commissioner in 2008, Gibbs was a top aide to Governor Douglas. He first joined Douglas on the Governor's first campaign in 2002. Gibbs went on to serve as the Governor's communications director from 2003 to 2008.

Gibbs announced on April 30, 2010, that he would be stepping down from his post as commissioner in mid-May.
