= H. Brooke Paige =

American perennial candidate (born 1953)

Brooke Paige
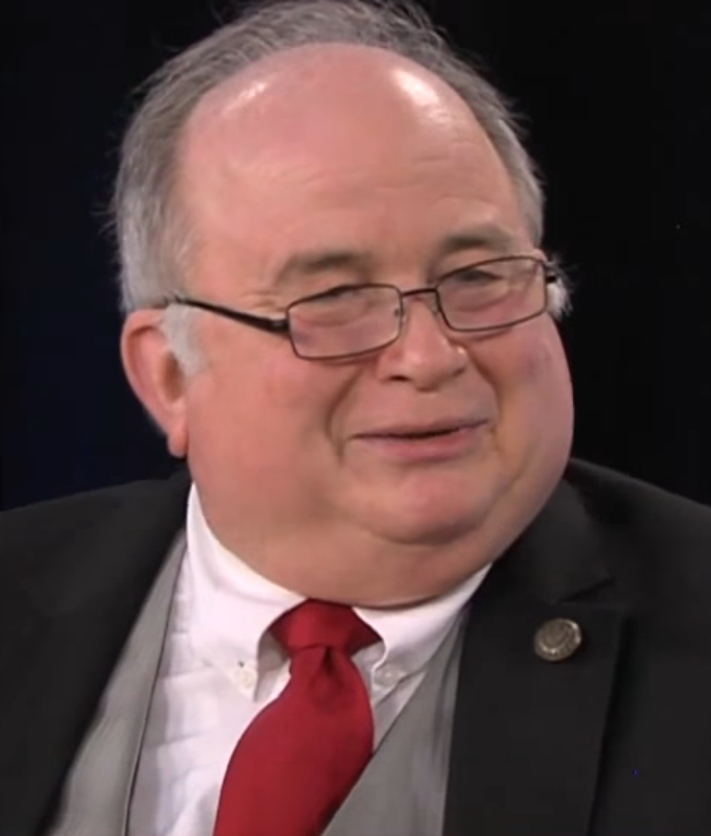
- Paige in 2018

Personal details
- Born: February 17, 1953 (age 73) New Orleans, Louisiana, U.S.
- Party: Republican (before 2014, 2018–present); Democratic (2014–2018)
- Other political affiliations: Grumpy Old Patriots (2020)
- Spouse: Donna Paige
- Education: University of Delaware (BBA)
- Paige's voice Paige on his life and running for Secretary of State of Vermont. Recorded October 17, 2018

H. Brooke Paige (born February 17, 1953) is an American perennial candidate and businessowner. He is known for his distinctive campaign style, often wearing a bow tie, along with a top hat or boater while campaigning. His reputation for running for multiple statewide offices simultaneously earned him the nickname "the most prolific candidate in Vermont" from Vermont Public.

He began his political career in 2012, seeking the Republican nomination for U.S. Senate but losing to John MacGovern. In 2014, he switched to the Democratic Party and ran for multiple offices simultaneously, taking advantage of Vermont law which allows it. From 2014 to 2018, he repeatedly lost in Democratic primaries, and by 2018, he returned to the Republican Party. He continued running for multiple offices at once, aiming to prevent Democrats from crossvoting and to ensure strong Republican candidates were on the ballot.

In 2012, Paige was also involved in litigation against President Barack Obama, challenging his eligibility to serve as president based on claims about his citizenship. The case continued until 2014 when the U.S. Supreme Court ultimately rejected any further appeals. In the 2020 presidential election, Paige appeared on the Vermont ballot under the "Grumpy Old Patriots" party.

== Early life and education ==
Paige was born on February 17, 1953, in New Orleans, Louisiana. He attended the University of Delaware, where he earned a Bachelor of Business Administration. After graduating, he worked as a food service manager and later for a pharmaceutical laboratory before eventually becoming a business owner, operating a newsstand. He moved to Vermont and commuted to Philadelphia, Pennsylvania, for work.

== Political career ==
=== U.S. Senate run and lawsuit against Obama ===
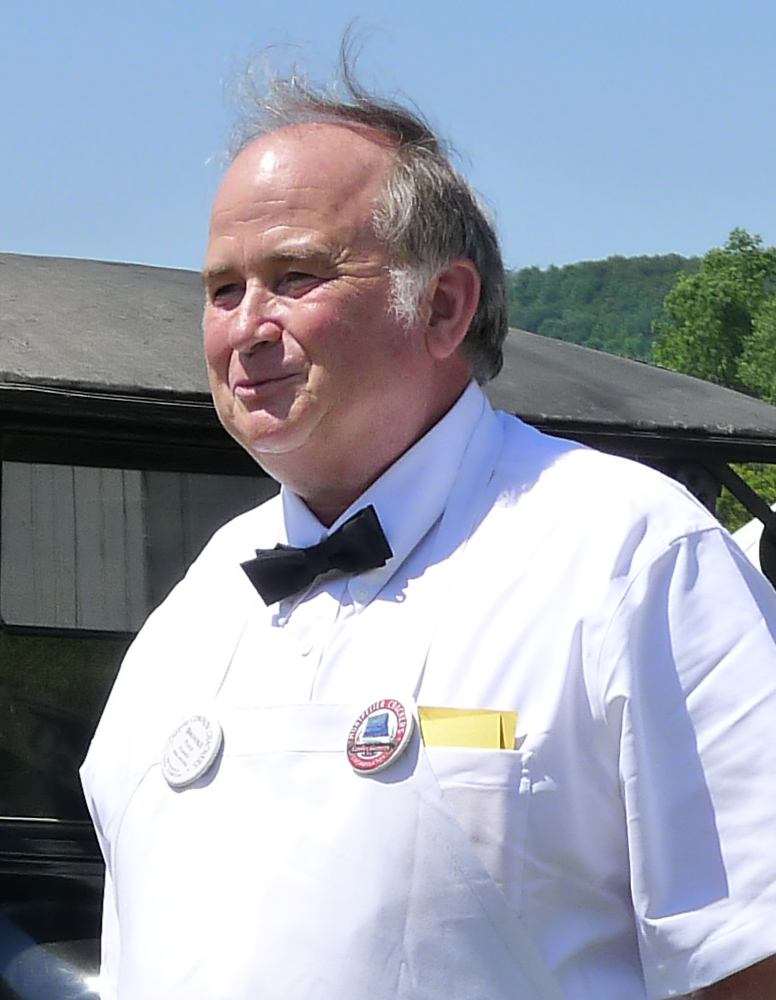
Paige during the 2012 Vermont History Expo

Paige made his first attempt at political office in 2012, running in the Republican primary for the United States Senate election. He lost to former Massachusetts State Representative John MacGovern, who went on to lose the general election to Bernie Sanders. That same year, he filed a lawsuit arguing that Barack Obama should be kept off the state's election ballot as a candidate for president because he was not a natural-born citizen. However, Judge Robert Bent ruled that the evidence was insufficient to grant an injunction. He appealed the case to the Vermont Supreme Court the following year, but the court ruled it moot after Obama was re-elected. Paige then took the case to the U.S. Supreme Court, which denied his request to hear the case in May. By August 2014, the U.S. Supreme Court summarily rejected Paige's further appeal.

=== Simultaneous runs for office ===
In 2014, Paige ran simultaneously for two offices, Governor and Attorney General, as a Democrat. He was able to run in multiple primaries because Vermont law permits candidates to run in several races simultaneously, and he believed that someone had to challenge the incumbents. He lost in both primaries, with incumbent Governor Peter Shumlin and incumbent Attorney General William Sorrell defeating him in their races. In 2016, he attempted another run for both Governor and Attorney General again. He lost to incumbent Attorney General T. J. Donovan, and in the gubernatorial primary, he faced four other candidates and placed last.

In August 2018, he secured six statewide nominations, running unopposed for treasurer, Secretary of State, Attorney General, and State Auditor, while defeating other Republican candidates in the U.S. Senate and House primaries. Despite winning the nominations, he withdrew from all but the Secretary of State race on August 24 to allow the Vermont Republican Party to name replacement candidates. In the general election for Secretary of State, he ran against incumbent Jim Condos, losing by a large margin.

=== Run for President and continued candidacies ===
Paige and Vermont Secretary of State Sarah Copeland Hanzas during a debate in 2026

In 2020, he ran for four separate offices, including for President of the United States under the Grumpy Old Patriots party. Out of the four races, he only withdrew from the State Treasurer race to allow Carolyn Whitney Branagan to run. In the Secretary of State and Attorney General races, he lost to the Democratic incumbents. In the presidential race, he placed sixth within the state of Vermont. He later claimed that Joe Biden, who won the presidential election, had been installed as president and questioned the integrity of the election.

In 2022, Paige ran for four offices but withdrew from three to focus on the Secretary of State race. However, when the Republican Party couldn't find another candidate for State Treasurer, he was renominated for that race as well. He was ultimately defeated by Mike Pieciak in the State Treasurer election and by Sarah Copeland Hanzas in the Secretary of State election. In 2024, he ran for three offices, eventually withdrawing from the Attorney General race. He faced incumbent Copeland Hanzas for Secretary of State and Doug Hoffer for State Auditor, although Paige expressed that he did not want the Auditor position and would request Governor Phil Scott to appoint Linda Joy Sullivan in his place if he won that race.

== Personal life ==
He is a self-described historian and an active member of the Friends of the Vermont Statehouse preservation group. He also volunteers for the Vermont Historical Society, the Statehouse, and serves on the local select board. He lives with his wife, Donna, in Washington, Vermont.

== Electoral history ==
Electoral history of H. Brooke Paige
Year	Office		Party	Primary			General			Result	Swing	Ref.
Year	Office		Party	Total	%	P.	Total	%	P.	Result	Swing	Ref.
2012	US Senate	VT	Republican	2,084	24.63%	2nd	Did not advance			Lost	Hold	
2014	Governor	VT	Democratic	3,199	16.13%	2nd	Did not advance			Lost	Hold	
2014	Attorney General	VT	Democratic	3,488	18.98%	2nd	Did not advance			Lost	Hold	
2016	Governor	VT	Democratic	387	0.60%	5th	Did not advance			Lost	Gain	
2016	Attorney General	VT	Democratic	11,917	19.49%	2nd	Did not advance			Lost	Hold	
2018	US Senate	VT	Republican	9,805	37.47%	1st	Withdrew from race			Lost	Hold	
2018	US House	VT	Republican	14,721	59.89%	1st	Withdrew from race			Lost	Hold	
2018	Secretary of State	VT	Republican	18,293	92.45%	1st	79,035	29.52%	2nd	Lost	Hold	
2018	State Treasurer	VT	Republican	41,023	98.10%	1st	Withdrew from race			Lost	Hold	
2018	State Auditor	VT	Republican	17,405	93.83%	1st	Withdrew from race			Lost	Hold	
2020	US President	VT	Grumpy Old Patriots	No primary held			1,175	0.32%	6th	Lost	Gain	
2020	Secretary of State	VT	Republican	40,765	92.45%	1st	99,564	26.84%	2nd	Lost	Hold	
2020	Attorney General	VT	Republican	21,574	49.42%	1st	94,892	25.58%	2nd	Lost	Hold	
2020	State Treasurer	VT	Republican	20,313	100.00%	1st	Withdrew from race			Lost	Hold	
2022	Attorney General	VT	Republican	20,668	95.75%	1st	Withdrew from race			Lost	Gain	
2022	Secretary of State	VT	Republican	21,591	96.63%	1st	95,666	32.77%	2nd	Lost	Hold	
2022	State Treasurer	VT	Republican	22,482	96.99%	1st	95,440	32.69%	2nd	Lost	Hold	
2022	State Auditor	VT	Republican	20,889	96.49%	1st	Withdrew from race			Lost	Hold	
2024	Attorney General	VT	Republican	18,081	97.06%	1st	Withdrew from race			Lost	Hold	
2024	Secretary of State	VT	Republican	21,591	98.10%	1st	138,673	37.19%	2nd	Lost	Hold	
2024	State Auditor	VT	Republican	18,129	96.55%	1st	134,066	35.95%	2nd	Lost	Hold	
2026	Attorney General	VT	Republican	16,511	96.42%	1st	Withdrew from race			Lost	Hold	
2026	Secretary of State	VT	Republican	17,364	97.35%	1st	96,142	32.58%	2nd	Lost	Hold	
2026	State Treasurer	VT	Republican	17,780	96.44%	1st	Withdrew from race			Lost	Hold	
2026	State Auditor	VT	Republican	16,695	96.68%	1st	Withdrew from race			Lost	Hold	

Party political offices
Preceded by John MacGovern	Republican nominee for U.S. Senator from Vermont (Class 1); Withdrew; 2018	Succeeded by Lawrence Zupan
Preceded by Jim Condos	Republican nominee for Secretary of State of Vermont; 2018, 2020, 2022, 2024, 2026	Most recent
Preceded by Deborah Bucknam	Republican nominee for Attorney General of Vermont; Withdrew; 2018	Succeeded by Janssen Willhoit
Preceded by Beth Pearce	Republican nominee for Treasurer of Vermont; Withdrew; 2018	Succeeded by Rick Morton
Preceded by Dan Feliciano	Republican nominee for Auditor of Vermont; Withdrew; 2018	Succeeded by Rick Kenyon
Preceded by Janssen Willhoit	Republican nominee for Attorney General of Vermont; 2020, 2022 (withdrew)	Succeeded by Mike Tagliavia
Preceded by Carolyn Whitney Branagan	Republican nominee for Treasurer of Vermont; 2022	Succeeded by Joshua Bechhoefer
Preceded by Doug Hoffer	Republican nominee for Auditor of Vermont; Withdrew; 2022	Succeeded by Rick Morton
Preceded by Mike Tagliavia	Republican nominee for Attorney General of Vermont; Withdrew; 2024	Succeeded by Ture Nelson
Preceded by Richard Morton	Republican nominee for Auditor of Vermont; 2024, 2026 (withdrew)	Succeeded by Ivar Kronick
Preceded by Ture Nelson	Republican nominee for Attorney General of Vermont; Withdrew; 2026	Succeeded by Ed Kemon
Preceded by Joshua Bechhoefer	Republican nominee for Treasurer of Vermont; Withdrew; 2026	Succeeded by Lynn LaFleur
