= 2014 Vermont elections =

A general election was held in the U.S. state of Vermont on November 4, 2014. All of Vermont's executive officers were up for election as well as Vermont's at-large seat in the United States House of Representatives. Primary elections were held on June 3, 2014.

== Lieutenant governor ==
2014 Vermont lieutenant gubernatorial election
- November 4, 2014
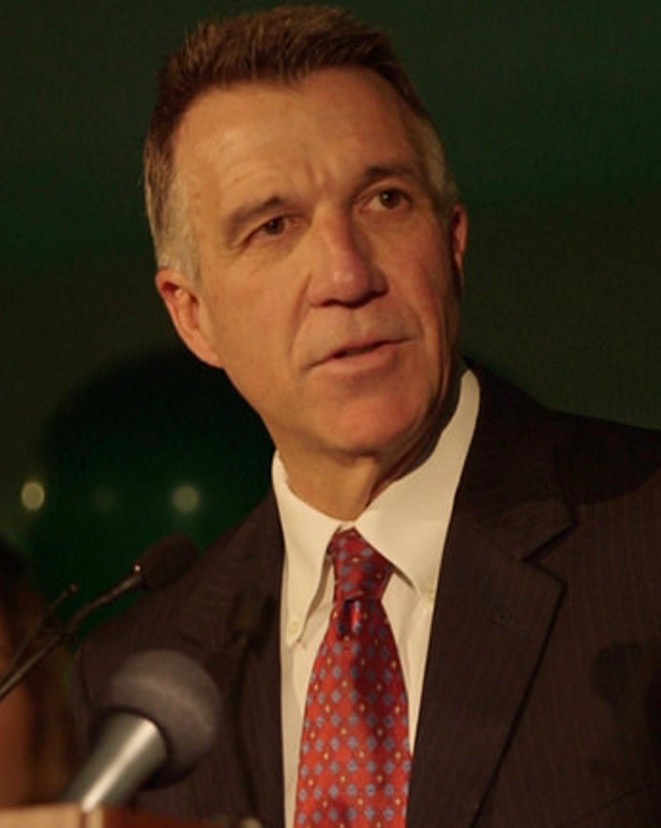

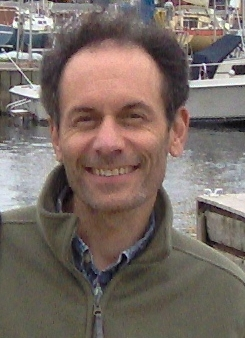
Nominee	Phil Scott	Dean Corren
Party	Republican	Progressive
Popular vote	118,949	69,005
Percentage	62.14%	36.1%
- Scott: 40–50% 50–60% 60–70% 70–80% 80–90% Corren: 40–50% 50–60% 60–70% 70–80% No Data/Vote
Lieutenant Governor before election
Phil Scott
Republican
Elected Lieutenant Governor
Phil Scott
Republican

Incumbent Republican lieutenant governor Phil Scott (since 2011) ran again for a third term.

=== Republican primary ===
Incumbent Phil Scott was unopposed in the Republican primary.

==== Results ====
Republican primary results
Party	Candidate	Votes	%
Republican	Phil Scott	15,282	99.19
Republican	Write-ins	125	0.81
Total votes		15,407	100%

=== Democratic primary ===
==== Candidates ====
===== Withdrew =====
- John Bauer

==== Results ====
Democratic primary results
Party	Candidate	Votes	%
Democratic	Write-ins	6,405	100.0
Total votes		6,405	100%

=== Progressive primary ===
Dean Corren, former State Representative (1991–2001), House campaign coordinator for U.S. Rep. Bernie Sanders (2001–2005), renewable electric utility officer at Burlington Electric Department and Verdant Power Inc., ran unopposed in the Progressive primary.

==== Results ====
Progressive primary results
Party	Candidate	Votes	%
Progressive	Dean Corren	284	94.35
Progressive	Write-ins	17	5.65
Total votes		301	100%

=== Liberty Union primary ===
Marina Brown, activist, ran unopposed in the Liberty Union primary.

==== Results ====
Liberty Union primary results
Party	Candidate	Votes	%
Liberty Union	Marina Brown	132	92.96
Liberty Union	Write-ins	10	7.04
Total votes		142	100%

=== General election ===
==== Candidates ====
- Marina Brown (LU)
- Dean Corren (P)
- Phil Scott (R)

==== Results ====
2014 Vermont lieutenant gubernatorial election
Party	Candidate	Votes	%
Republican	Phil Scott (incumbent)	118,949	62.14
Progressive	Dean Corren	69,005	36.05
Liberty Union	Marina Brown	3,347	1.75
Write-in	Write-ins	115	0.06
Total votes		191,416	100%

== Secretary of State ==
2014 Vermont secretary of state election
- November 4, 2014
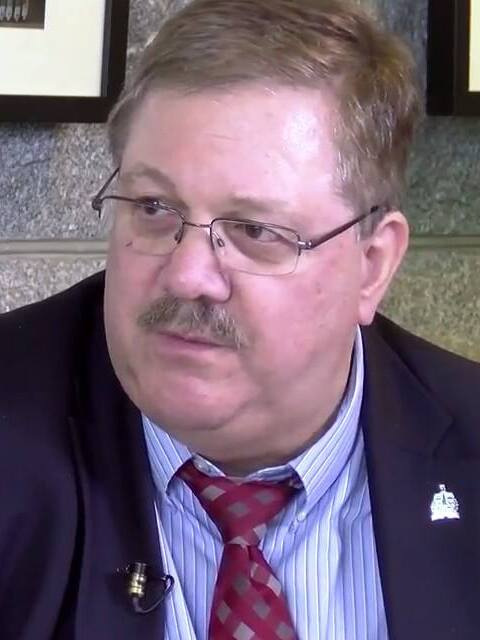

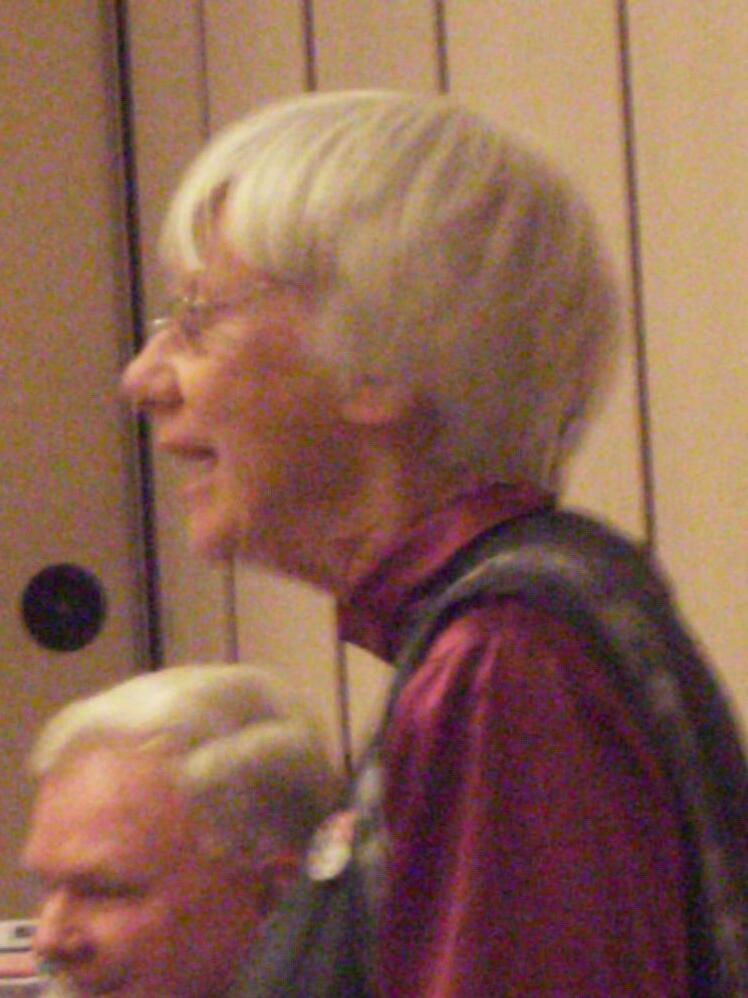
Nominee	Jim Condos	Ben Eastwood	Mary Alice Herbert
Party	Democratic	Progressive	Liberty Union
Popular vote	126,427	24,518	17,460
Percentage	74.75%	14.5%	10.32%
- Condos: 50–60% 60–70% 70–80% 80–90% No Data/Vote
Secretary of State before election
Jim Condos
Democratic
Elected Secretary of State
Jim Condos
Democratic

Incumbent Democratic secretary of state Jim Condos (since 2011) ran again for a third term.

=== Democratic primary ===
Democratic primary results
Party	Candidate	Votes	%
Democratic	Jim Condos	16,598	98.65
Democratic	Write-ins	227	1.35
Total votes		16,825	100%

=== Republican primary ===
Republican primary results
Party	Candidate	Votes	%
Republican	Write-ins	1,189	100.0
Total votes		1,189	100%

=== Progressive primary ===
Progressive primary results
Party	Candidate	Votes	%
Progressive	Ben Eastwood	207	94.09
Progressive	Write-ins	13	5.91
Total votes		220	100%

=== Liberty Union primary ===
Liberty Union primary results
Party	Candidate	Votes	%
Liberty Union	Mary Alice Herbert	134	98.53
Liberty Union	Write-ins	2	1.47
Total votes		136	100%

=== General election ===
==== Candidates ====
- Jim Condos (D)
- Ben Eastwood (P)
- Mary Alice Herbert (LU)

==== Results ====
2014 Vermont Secretary of State election
Party	Candidate	Votes	%
Democratic	Jim Condos (incumbent)	126,427	74.75
Progressive	Ben Eastwood	24,518	14.5
Liberty Union	Mary Alice Herbert	17,460	10.32
Write-in	Write-ins	730	0.43
Total votes		169,135	100%

== Treasurer ==
2014 Vermont treasurer election
- November 4, 2014
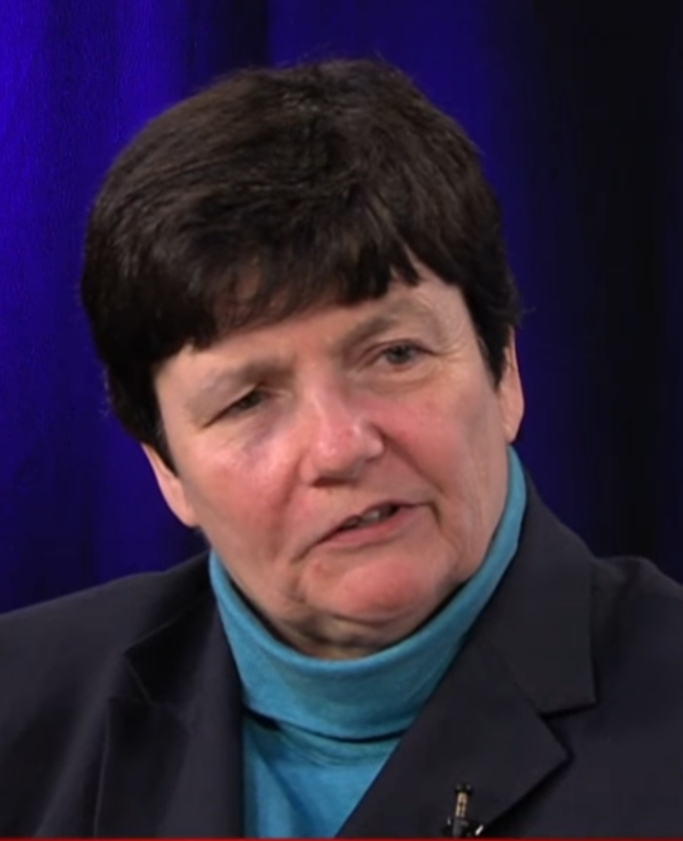

Nominee	Beth Pearce	Don Schramm
Party	Democratic	Progressive
Alliance	Republican
Popular vote	124,119	28,990
Percentage	74.6%	17.3%
- Pearce: 40–50% 50–60% 60–70% 70–80% 80–90% No Data/Vote
Treasurer before election
Beth Pearce
Democratic
Elected Treasurer
Beth Pearce
Democratic

Incumbent Democratic/Republican Treasurer Beth Pearce (since 2011) ran again for a third term.

=== Democratic primary ===
Democratic primary results
Party	Candidate	Votes	%
Democratic	Beth Pearce	16,312	99.26
Democratic	Write-ins	122	0.74
Total votes		16,434	100

=== Republican primary ===
Republican primary results
Party	Candidate	Votes	%
Republican	Beth Pearce (write-in)	1,176	93.63
Republican	Write-ins (other)	80	6.37
Total votes		1,256	100%

=== Progressive primary ===
Progressive primary results
Party	Candidate	Votes	%
Progressive	Write-ins	89	100.0
Total votes		89	100%

=== Liberty Union primary ===
Liberty Union primary results
Party	Candidate	Votes	%
Liberty Union	Murray Ngoima	129	98.47
Liberty Union	Write-ins	2	1.53
Total votes		131	100%

=== General election ===
==== Candidates ====
- Murray Ngoima (LU)
- Beth Pearce (D/R)
- Don Schramm (P)

==== Results ====
Vermont State Treasurer election, 2014
Party	Candidate	Votes	%
Democratic	Beth Pearce (incumbent)	124,119	74.06
Progressive	Don Schramm	28,990	17.3
Liberty Union	Murray Ngoima	13,456	8.03
Write-in	Write-ins	1,027	0.61
Total votes		167,592	100

== Attorney general ==
2014 Vermont attorney general election
- November 4, 2014

Nominee	William Sorrell	Shane McCormack
Party	Democratic	Republican
Popular vote	109,305	69,489
Percentage	58.64%	37.28%
- Sorrell: 40–50% 50–60% 60–70% 70–80% 80–90% McCormack: 40–50% 50–60% 60–70% Tie: 50% No Data/Vote
Attorney general before election
William Sorrell
Democratic
Elected Attorney general
William Sorrell
Democratic

Incumbent attorney general William Sorrell (since 1997) ran again for a tenth term.

=== Democratic primary ===
Democratic primary results
Party	Candidate	Votes	%
Democratic	William Sorrell	14,734	80.19
Democratic	H. Brooke Paige	3,488	18.98
Democratic	Write-ins	152	0.83
Total votes		18,374	100%

=== Republican primary ===
Republican primary results
Party	Candidate	Votes	%
Republican	Shane McCormack (write-in)	2,176	98.37
Republican	Write-ins (other)	36	1.63
Total votes		2,212	100%

=== Progressive primary ===
Progressive primary results
Party	Candidate	Votes	%
Progressive	Write-ins	64	100.0
Total votes		64	100%

=== Liberty Union primary ===
Liberty Union primary results
Party	Candidate	Votes	%
Liberty Union	Rosemarie Jackowski	136	97.14
Liberty Union	Write-ins	4	2.86
Total votes		140	100%

=== General election ===
==== Candidates ====
- Rosemarie Jackowski (LU)
- Shane McCormack (R)
- William Sorrell (D)

==== Results ====
Vermont Attorney General election, 2014
Party	Candidate	Votes	%
Democratic	William Sorrell (incumbent)	109,305	58.64
Republican	Shane McCormack	69,489	37.28
Liberty Union	Rosemarie Jackowski	7,342	3.94
Write-in	Write-ins	263	0.14
Total votes		186,399	100%

== Auditor of Accounts ==
2014 Vermont auditor election
- November 4, 2014
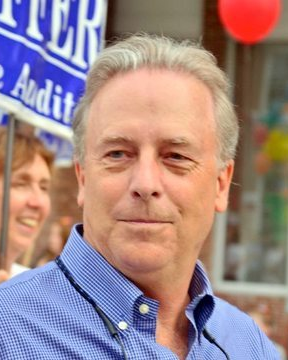
Nominee	Doug Hoffer
Party	Democratic
Popular vote	146,836
Percentage	99.6%
- Hoffer: 90–100% No Data/Vote
Auditor before election
Doug Hoffer
Democratic
Elected Auditor
Doug Hoffer
Democratic

Incumbent Democratic/Progressive Auditor Doug Hoffer (since 2013) ran again for a second term.

=== Democratic primary ===
Democratic primary results
Party	Candidate	Votes	%
Democratic	Doug Hoffer	16,229	99.8
Democratic	Write-ins	32	0.2
Total votes		16,261	100%

=== Republican primary ===
Republican primary results
Party	Candidate	Votes	%
Republican	Write-ins	913	100.0
Total votes		913	100%

=== Progressive primary ===
Progressive primary results
Party	Candidate	Votes	%
Progressive	Doug Hoffer (write-in)	103	100.0
Total votes		103	100%

=== Liberty Union primary ===
Liberty Union primary results
Party	Candidate	Votes	%
Liberty Union	Write-ins	21	100.0
Total votes		21	100%

=== General election ===
==== Candidates ====
- Doug Hoffer (D/P)

==== Results ====
Vermont Auditor of Accounts election, 2014
Party	Candidate	Votes	%
Democratic	Doug Hoffer (incumbent)	146,836	99.06
Write-in	Write-ins	1,391	0.94
Total votes		148,227	100%
