= 2008 Vermont elections =

- November 4, 2008

The Vermont election in 2008 consisted of elections for federal, state, and local elections. All state offices are for two years; all terms expired in 2008. Elections included the gubernatorial, all state offices, including all state senators and representatives, the federal Congress, and the presidential. There was no federal Senate election.

A primary election in August determined which candidates parties would choose to run in the general election in November. An earlier primary selected Vermont's choices for candidates for president. 72% of the voters, 327,301, turned out for the general election. This was the highest percentage, so far, in the 21st century. A record 26% of young voters turned out.

== Federal elections ==
=== Presidential ===
Democrat Barack Obama carried the state's three electoral votes in the general election.

Primary Polls On February 24, 2008, polls showed Sen. Barack Obama leading Sen. Hillary Clinton by an average margin of 24% (57% to 33%), with 10% Not Sure.

Democratic Party Results

Key:	Withdrew prior to contest

Vermont Democratic presidential primary, 2008
Candidate	Votes	Percentage	Delegates
Barack Obama	91,901	59.31%	9
Hillary Clinton	59,806	38.59%	6
John Edwards	1,936	1.25%	0
Dennis Kucinich	1,010	0.65%	0
Write-in candidates	307	0.20%	0
Totals	154,960	100.00%	15

Republican Party Results

Official Results
Candidate	Votes	Percentage	Delegates
John McCain	28,417	71.32%	17
Mike Huckabee	5,698	14.30%	0
Ron Paul	2,635	6.61%	0
Mitt Romney*	1,809	4.45%	0
Rudy Giuliani*	931	2.24%	0
Write-in	353	0.89%	0
Total	39,843	100%	17

* Candidate dropped out of the race before the primary

=== U.S. House ===
Democratic Congressman Peter Welch decided to run for a second term in Congress. Welch encountered no major-party opposition and defeated a series of independent candidates.

== Governor ==
2008 Vermont gubernatorial election
Party	Candidate	Votes	%	±%
Republican	Jim Douglas (incumbent)	170,492	53.43	−2.93%
Independent	Anthony Pollina	69,791	21.87	N/A
Democratic	Gaye Symington	69,534	21.79	−19.37%
Independent	Tony O'Connor	3,106	0.97	N/A
Independent	Sam Young	2,490	0.78	N/A
Liberty Union	Pete Diamondstone	1,710	0.54	+0.30%
Independent	Cris Ericson	1,704	0.53	−0.41%
	write-ins	258	0.08	N/A
Majority		100,701	31.56%	
Turnout		319,085		
Republican hold		Swing		

== Lieutenant governor ==
2008 Vermont lieutenant gubernatorial election results
Party	Candidate	Votes	%	±%
Republican	Brian Dubie	171,744	55.08%	+3.91%
Democratic	Thomas W. Costello	121,953	39.11%	−6.36%
Progressive	Richard Kemp	14,249	4.57%	+2.40%
Liberty Union	Ben Mitchell	3,639	1.17	+0.02%
Write-in		207	0.07	+0.03%
Total votes		260,430	100.00%	
Republican hold				

== See also ==
- 2008 Vermont Democratic primary
- 2008 Vermont Republican primary
