= Jim Condos =

American politician

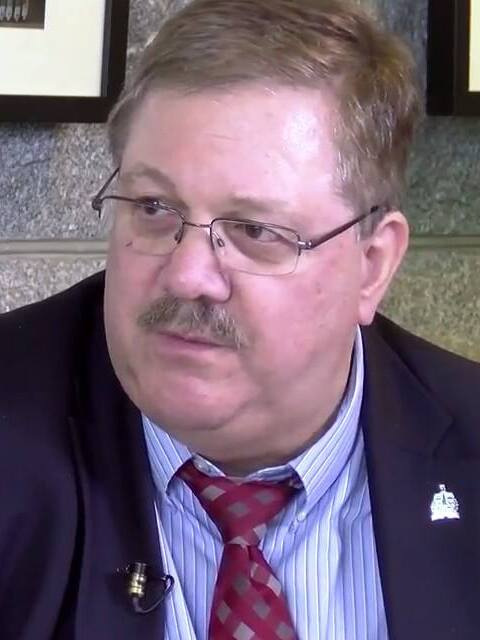

39th Secretary of State of Vermont
- In office January 6, 2011 – January 5, 2023
- Governor: Peter Shumlin; Phil Scott
- Preceded by: Deborah Markowitz
- Succeeded by: Sarah Copeland Hanzas

Personal details
- Born: January 29, 1951 (age 75) Orange, New Jersey, U.S.
- Party: Democratic
- Education: University of Vermont (BS)

James Christos Condos (born January 29, 1951) is an American politician from Vermont. He is a former Vermont Secretary of State and former Democratic member of the Vermont State Senate, representing the Chittenden senate district. The district includes all of Chittenden County, except the town of Colchester.

Condos served in the Vermont State Senate from 2001 to 2009. He was succeeded by Tim Ashe.

In June 2010, Jim Condos announced he was running for Vermont Secretary of State in the November 2010 election. He won the Democratic Party primary by a 2 to 1 vote, winning in every Vermont county. In the general election, Condos defeated Jason Gibbs.

== Biography ==
Jim Condos was raised, educated, and worked his entire career in Vermont. He comes from a working-class family. His father, Chris, worked in the restaurant business, and his mother, Irene, worked as an administrative assistant to the Dean of Arts and Sciences at the University of Vermont. He is of Greek descent.

Condos attended Burlington public schools until his family moved to South Burlington where he graduated from South Burlington High School. He graduated from the University of Vermont with a Bachelor of Science degree in Resource Economics.

His entire working career has been in Vermont, with both public and private experience. His experience has involved managing, policy making, operations, and service to Vermonters. He worked for a Fortune 100 company, a $30 million Vermont family owned business, and a state regulated utility.

He has one daughter, Chelsea, living in South Burlington with her husband and two children.

== Public life ==
Condos served for eight years in the Vermont Senate representing Chittenden County, and for 18 years on the South Burlington City Council.

Condos served as Chair of Senate Education and Chair of Senate Government Operations Committees, and Chair of the South Burlington City Council for eight years.

Condos has also served on the Chittenden County Regional Planning Commission, Chittenden Solid Waste District, The Chittenden County Transportation Authority; the Chittenden County Metropolitan Planning Organization; and he also served as a board member for the Vermont League of Cities and Towns and the National League of Cities.

Condos became President of the National Association of Secretaries of State in July 2018.

== See also ==
- Members of the Vermont Senate, 2005-2006 session
- Members of the Vermont Senate, 2007-2008 session

Party political offices
Preceded by Deborah Markowitz	Democratic nominee for Secretary of State of Vermont; 2010, 2012, 2014, 2016, 2018, 2020	Succeeded by Sarah Copeland-Hanzas
Preceded by Jason Gibbs	Republican nominee for Secretary of State of Vermont; 2012, 2016	Succeeded by H. Brooke Paige
Political offices
Preceded by Deborah Markowitz	Secretary of State of Vermont; 2011–2023	Succeeded by Sarah Copeland-Hanzas
