= 2024 United States secretary of state elections =

- November 5, 2024

7 secretary of state offices (Note: Seat tallies and popular vote do not include states that do not elect secretaries of state.)
	Majority party	Minority party
Party	Republican	Democratic
Seats before	19	16
Seats after	19	16
Seat change	Steady	Steady
Popular vote	7,848,361	8,016,218
Percentage	48.92%	49.96%
Seats up	3	4
Seats won	3	4
- Democratic hold Republican hold No election

The 2024 United States Secretary of State elections were held on November 5, 2024, to elect the Secretaries of State in seven states. These elections took place concurrently with several other federal, state, and local elections.

The elections for Secretary of State had taken on heightened importance due to former President Donald Trump's false claims that the 2020 election was stolen.

The previous elections for this group of states took place in 2020. The secretary of state of Vermont serves two-year terms and was last elected in 2022.

Going into the election, there were 19 elected Republican secretaries of state and 16 elected Democratic secretaries of state. 4 Democratic secretaries of state were up for election, of whom LaVonne Griffin-Valade of Oregon retired. 3 Republican secretaries of state were up for election, of whom Jay Ashcroft of Missouri and Mac Warner of West Virginia retired.

== Partisan composition ==
Going into these elections, this class of secretaries of state was made up of 4 Democrats and 3 Republicans. Democrats were defending one state won by Donald Trump in 2020 (North Carolina), while Republicans did not hold any states won by Joe Biden.

== Election predictions ==
Several sites and individuals published predictions of competitive seats. These predictions looked at factors such as the strength of the incumbent (if the incumbent is running for re-election), the strength of the candidates, and the partisan leanings of the state (reflected in part by the state's Cook Partisan Voting Index rating). The predictions assigned ratings to each seat, with the rating indicating the predicted advantage that a party has in winning that seat.

Most election predictors use:

- "tossup": no advantage
- "tilt" (used by some predictors): advantage that is not quite as strong as "lean"
- "lean": slight advantage
- "likely": significant, but surmountable, advantage
- "safe" or "solid" : near-certain chance of victory

State	PVI	Incumbent	Sabato January 31, 2024	Result
Missouri	R+10	Jay Ashcroft (retiring)	Solid R	Hoskins; 57.7% R
Montana	R+11	Christi Jacobsen	Safe R	Jacobsen; 61.4% R
North Carolina	R+3	Elaine Marshall	Lean D	Marshall; 51.2% D
Oregon	D+6	LaVonne Griffin-Valade (retiring)	Safe D	Read; 54.45% D
Vermont	D+16	Sarah Copeland Hanzas	Solid D	Copeland Hanzas; 59.61% D
Washington	D+8	Steve Hobbs	Safe D	Hobbs; 59.2% D
West Virginia	R+22	Mac Warner	Safe R	Kris Warner; 71.15% R

== Race summary ==
State	Secretary of State	Party	First elected	Status	Candidates
Missouri	Jay Ashcroft	Republican	2016	Incumbent retired to run for governor. Republican hold.	▌ ✓ Denny Hoskins (Republican) 57.7%; ▌Barbara Phifer (Democratic) 39.7%; ▌Carl Freese (Libertarian) 1.7%; ▌Jerome Bauer (Green) 1.0%
Montana	Christi Jacobsen	Republican	2020	Incumbent re-elected.	▌ ✓ Christi Jacobsen (Republican) 61.39%; ▌Jesse Mullen (Democratic) 35.49%; ▌John Lamb (Libertarian) 3.12%
North Carolina	Elaine Marshall	Democratic	1996	Incumbent re-elected.	▌ ✓ Elaine Marshall (Democratic) 51.04%; ▌Chad Brown (Republican) 48.96%
Oregon	LaVonne Griffin-Valade	Democratic	2023 (appointed)	Interim appointee retired. Democratic hold.	▌ ✓ Tobias Read (Democratic) 54.45%; ▌Dennis Linthicum (Republican) 41.9%; ▌Nathalie Paravicini (Pacific Green) 3.56%
Vermont	Sarah Copeland Hanzas	Democratic	2022	Incumbent re-elected.	▌ ✓ Sarah Copeland Hanzas (Democratic) 59.61%; ▌H. Brooke Paige (Republican) 40.25%
Washington	Steve Hobbs	Democratic	2022 (special)	Incumbent re-elected.	▌ ✓ Steve Hobbs (Democratic) 59.2%; ▌Dale Whitaker (Republican) 40.7%
West Virginia	Mac Warner	Republican	2016	Incumbent retired to run for governor. Republican hold.	▌ ✓ Kris Warner (Republican) 71.15%; ▌Thornton Cooper (Democratic) 28.85%

== Closest races ==
States where the margin of victory was between 1% and 5%:

1. North Carolina, 2.08%

Blue denotes races won by Democrats. Red denotes races won by Republicans.

== Missouri ==
Missouri Secretary of State election
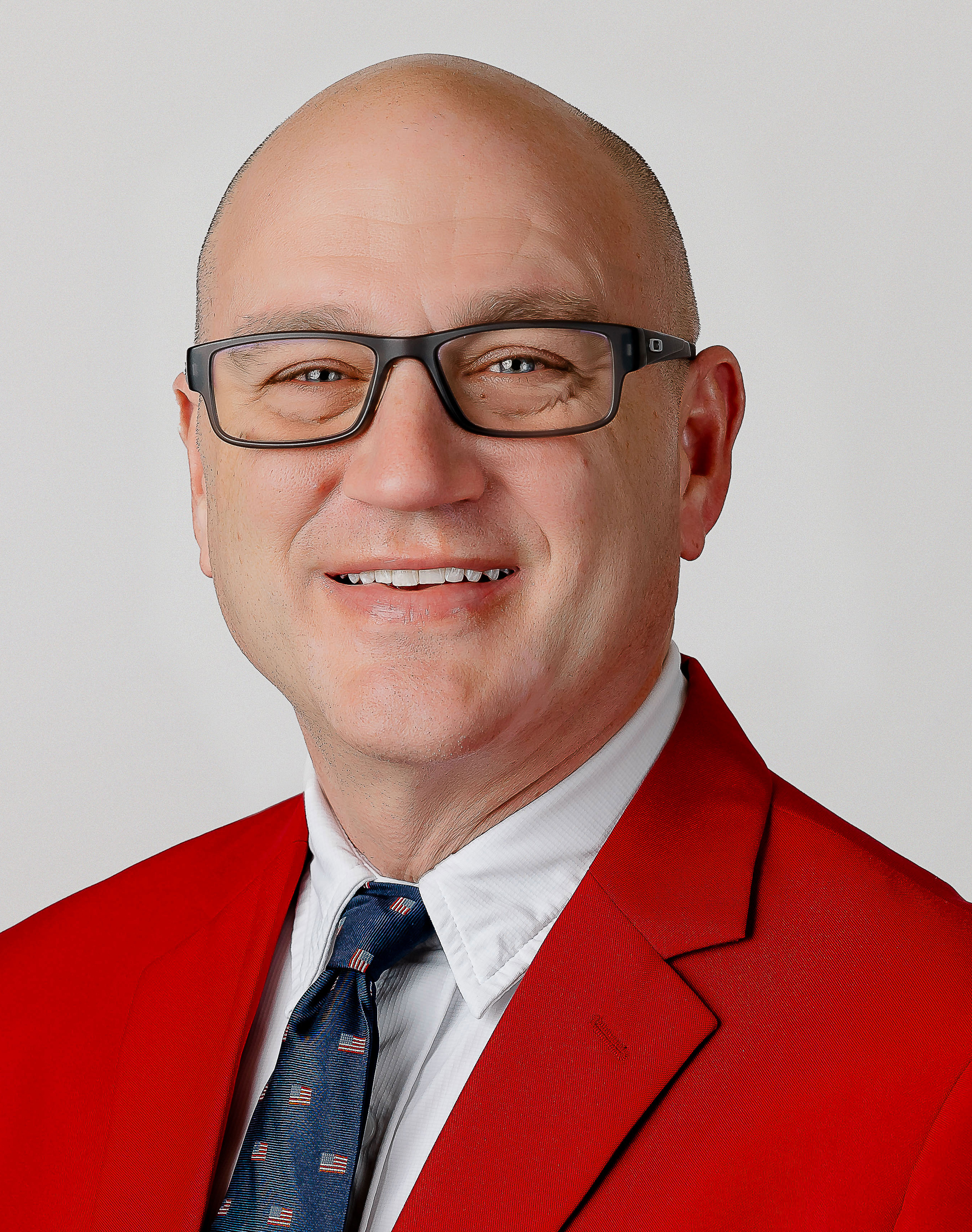

Nominee	Denny Hoskins	Barbara Phifer
Party	Republican	Democratic
Popular vote	1,677,902	1,154,090
Percentage	57.7%	39.7%
- County results Hoskins: 50–60% 60–70% 70–80% 80–90% Phifer: 50–60% 60–70% 70–80% 80–90%
Secretary of State before election
Jay Ashcroft
Republican
Elected Secretary of State
Denny Hoskins
Republican

Incumbent Republican Jay Ashcroft was eligible to serve a third term, but has instead decided to run for governor.

State senator Denny Hoskins defeated businesswoman Valentina Gomez, state senate President pro tempore Caleb Rowden, Greene County clerk Shane Schoeller and state representative Adam Schwadron to win the Republican primary.

State representative Barbara Phifer defeated accountant Monique Williams, and travel agent Haley Jacobson in the Democratic primary. A fourth candidate, Gavin Bena, initially filed to run but later withdrew from the race.

On November 5, 2024, Hoskins defeated Phifer by 18 percentage points.

Republican primary results
Party	Candidate	Votes	%
Republican	Denny Hoskins	157,116	24.42
Republican	Shane Schoeller	108,289	16.83
Republican	Mike Carter	91,866	14.28
Republican	Dean Plocher	86,659	13.47
Republican	Mary Elizabeth Coleman	72,938	11.34
Republican	Valentina Gomez	47,931	7.45
Republican	Jamie Corley	46,314	7.20
Republican	Adam Schwadron	32,335	5.03
Total votes		643,448	100.00

Democratic primary results
Party	Candidate	Votes	%
Democratic	Barbara Phifer	146,284	40.86
Democratic	Monique Williams	123,270	34.43
Democratic	Haley Jacobsen	88,491	24.72
Total votes		358,045	100.00

2024 Missouri Secretary of State election
Party	Candidate	Votes	%	±%
Republican	Denny Hoskins	1,677,902	57.66%	−2.93%
Democratic	Barbara Phifer	1,154,090	39.66%	+3.38%
Libertarian	Carl Freese	49,113	1.69%	−0.18%
Green	Jerome Bauer	29,012	1.00%	+0.19%
Total votes		2,910,117	100.00%	N/A
Republican hold				

== Montana ==
Montana Secretary of State election
Nominee	Christi Jacobsen	Jesse Mullen
Party	Republican	Democratic
Popular vote	364,319	210,651
Percentage	61.4%	35.5%
- County results Jacobsen: 40–50% 50–60% 60–70% 70–80% 80–90% 90–100% Mullen: 40–50% 50–60%
Secretary of State before election
Christi Jacobsen
Republican
Elected Secretary of State
Christi Jacobsen
Republican

Incumbent Republican Christi Jacobsen successfully ran for a second term, defeating Democratic newspaper publisher Jesse Mullen.

Montana Secretary of State election, 2024
Party	Candidate	Votes	%
Republican	Christi Jacobsen (incumbent)	364,319	61.39%
Democratic	Jesse Mullen	210,651	35.49%
Libertarian	John Lamb	18,500	3.12%
Total votes		593,470	100.00%
Republican hold			

== North Carolina ==
North Carolina Secretary of State election
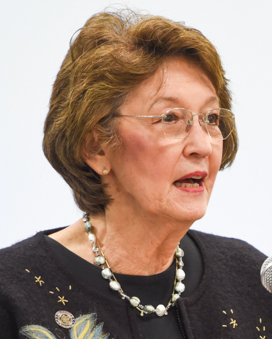

Nominee	Elaine Marshall	Chad Brown
Party	Democratic	Republican
Popular vote	2,837,994	2,722,794
Percentage	51.04%	48.96%
- County results Marshall: 50–60% 60–70% 70–80% 80–90% Brown: 50–60% 60–70% 70–80% 80–90%
Secretary of State before election
Elaine Marshall
Democratic
Elected Secretary of State
Elaine Marshall
Democratic

Incumbent Democrat Elaine Marshall successfully ran for re-election to an eighth term, defeating Republican Chad Brown.

Republican primary results
Party	Candidate	Votes	%
Republican	Chad Brown	373,166	43.26%
Republican	Christine Villaverde	258,569	29.98%
Republican	Jesse Thomas	230,829	26.76%
Total votes		862,564	100.0%

2024 North Carolina Secretary of State election
Party	Candidate	Votes	%	±%
Democratic	Elaine Marshall (incumbent)	2,837,994	51.04%	–0.12%
Republican	Chad Brown	2,722,794	48.96%	+0.12%
Total votes		5,560,788	100.0%	
Democratic hold				

== Oregon ==
Oregon Secretary of State election
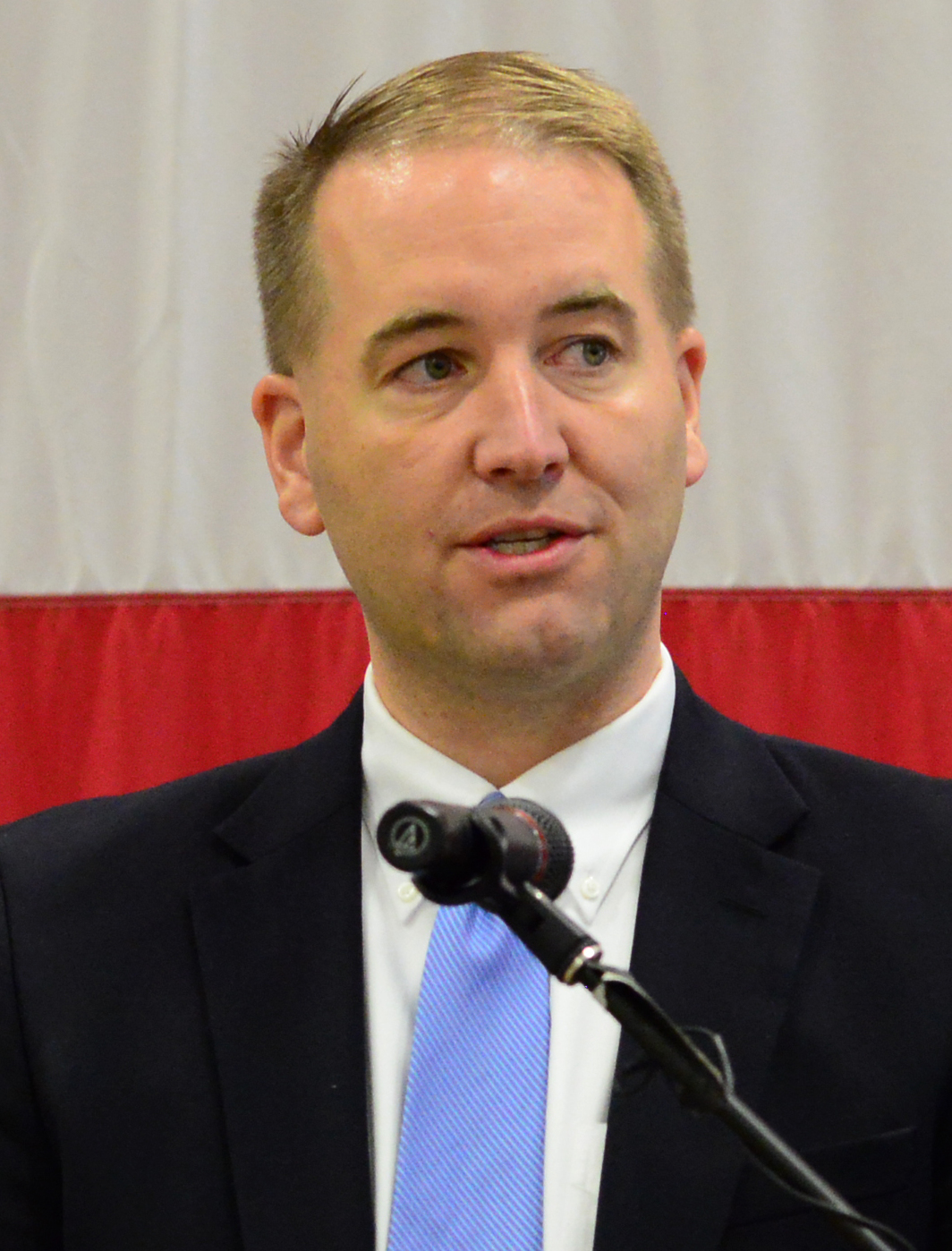

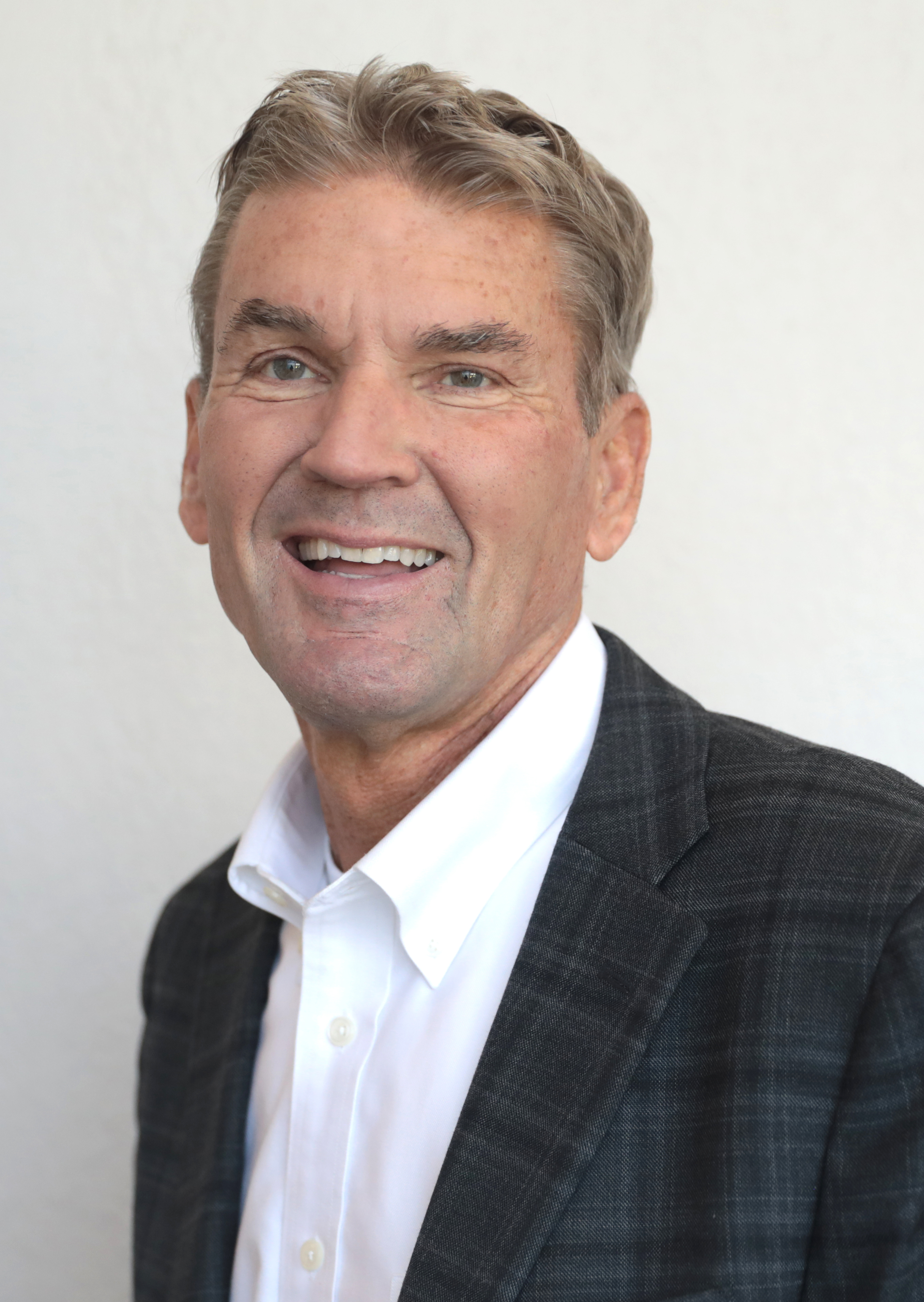
Nominee	Tobias Read	Dennis Linthicum
Party	Democratic	Republican
Popular vote	1,166,447	897,704
Percentage	54.45%	41.90%
- County results Read: 40–50% 50–60% 60–70% 70–80% 80–90% >90% Linthicum: 40–50% 50–60% 60–70% 70–80% 80–90% >90% Tie: 40–50% 50% No votes
Secretary of State before election
LaVonne Griffin-Valade
Democratic
Elected Secretary of State
Tobias Read
Democratic

Incumbent Democrat LaVonne Griffin-Valade was appointed by Governor Tina Kotek to replace Shemia Fagan, who resigned in May 2023 after revelations that she took a consulting job at a cannabis company while her office was auditing Oregon's marijuana industry, which many considered to be a conflict of interest. Griffin-Valade did not seek election to a full term.

Democratic nominee Tobias Read won the general election on November 5, 2024.

Democratic primary results
Party	Candidate	Votes	%
Democratic	Tobias Read	303,089	69.40%
Democratic	James Manning Jr.	97,427	22.31%
Democratic	Jim Crary	16,340	3.74%
Democratic	Paul Damian Wells	9,425	2.16%
Democratic	Dave Stauffer	7,921	1.81%
Write-in		2,515	0.58%
Total votes		436,717	100.00%

Republican primary results
Party	Candidate	Votes	%
Republican	Dennis Linthicum	199,243	65.99%
Republican	Brent Barker	61,011	20.21%
Republican	Tim McCloud	39,109	12.95%
Write-in		2,560	0.85%
Total votes		301,923	100.00%

2024 Oregon Secretary of State election
Party	Candidate	Votes	%	±%
Democratic	Tobias Read	1,166,447	54.45%	+4.14%
Republican	Dennis Linthicum	897,704	41.90%	–1.31%
Pacific Green	Nathalie Paravicini	76,170	3.56%	–0.05%
Write-in		2,011	0.09%	–0.01%
Total votes		2,142,332	100.0%	
Democratic hold				

== Vermont ==
Vermont Secretary of State election
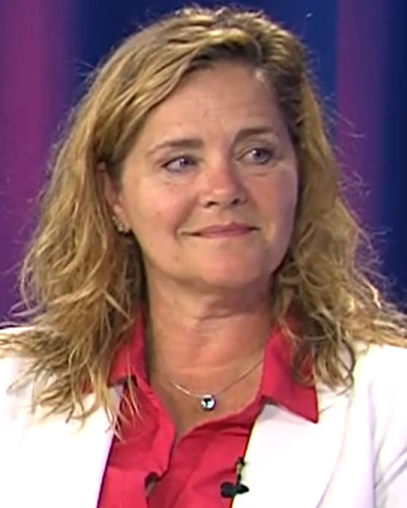

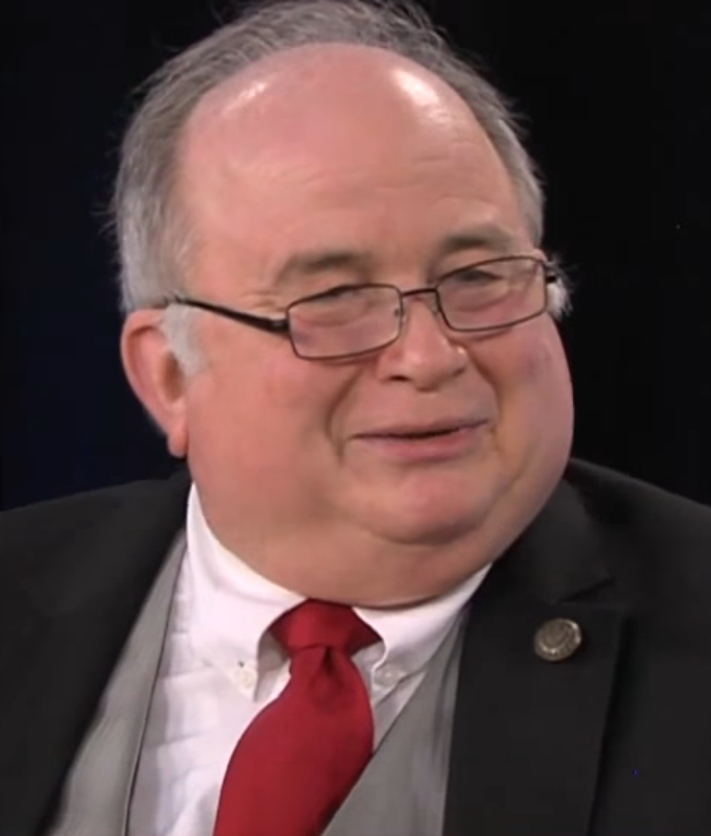
Nominee	Sarah Copeland Hanzas	H. Brooke Paige
Party	Democratic	Republican
Popular vote	205,378	138,673
Percentage	59.61%	40.25%
- Hanzas: 50–60% 60–70% 70–80% 80–90% Paige: 50–60% 60–70% 70–80% No votes
Secretary of State before election
Sarah Copeland Hanzas
Democratic
Elected Secretary of State
Sarah Copeland Hanzas
Democratic

Incumbent secretary of state Sarah Copeland Hanzas was re-elected to a second two-year term, defeating Republican newsstand owner H. Brooke Paige.

Democratic primary results
Party	Candidate	Votes	%
Democratic	Sarah Copeland Hanzas (incumbent)	43,182	99.32%
Write-in		294	0.68%
Total votes		43,476	100.00%

Republican primary results
Party	Candidate	Votes	%
Republican	H. Brooke Paige	18,989	98.10%
Write-in		368	1.90%
Total votes		19,357	100.00%

2024 Vermont Secretary of State Election
Party	Candidate	Votes	%
Democratic	Sarah Copeland Hanzas (incumbent)	205,378	59.61%
Republican	H. Brooke Paige	138,673	40.25%
Write-in		473	0.14%
Total votes		344,524	100.00%

== Washington ==
Washington Secretary of State election
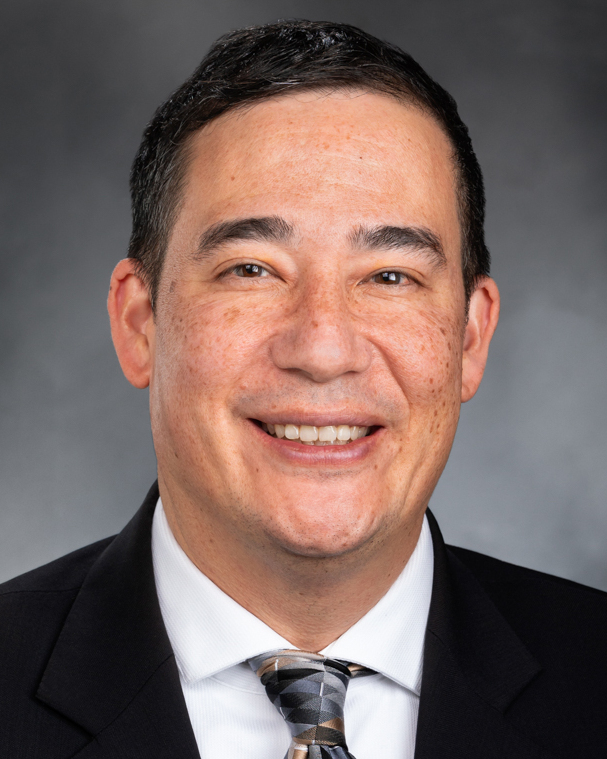

Nominee	Steve Hobbs	Dale Whitaker
Party	Democratic	Republican
Popular vote	2,234,420	1,535,977
Percentage	59.20%	40.70%
- County results Hobbs: 50–60% 60–70% 70–80% Whitaker: 50–60% 60–70% 70–80%
Secretary of State before election
Steve Hobbs
Democratic
Elected Secretary of State
Steve Hobbs
Democratic

Incumbent Democratic Secretary of State Steve Hobbs was appointed to the position in 2021 after the resignation of Kim Wyman. He won a 2022 special election to serve out the remaining two years of Wyman's term and ran for re-election to a full term in 2024. Hobbs won the election decisively against Republican candidate Dale Whitaker.

Blanket primary election results
Party	Candidate	Votes	%
Democratic	Steve Hobbs (incumbent)	930,533	48.38%
Republican	Dale Whitaker	709,046	36.87%
Democratic	Marquez Tiggs	185,628	9.65%
No Labels	Damon Townsend	96,586	5.02%
Write-in		1,534	0.08%
Total votes		1,923,327	100.0%

2024 Washington Secretary of State election
Party	Candidate	Votes	%	±%
Democratic	Steve Hobbs (incumbent)	2,234,420	59.20%	+9.43%
Republican	Dale Whitaker	1,535,977	40.70%	N/A
Write-in		3,958	0.10%	–4.30%
Total votes		3,774,355	100.00%	N/A
Democratic hold				

== West Virginia ==
West Virginia Secretary of State election
Nominee	Kris Warner	Thornton Cooper
Party	Republican	Democratic
Popular vote	510,992	207,238
Percentage	71.15%	28.85%
- County results Warner: 50–60% 60–70% 70–80% 80–90%
Secretary of State before election
Mac Warner
Republican
Elected Secretary of State
Kris Warner
Republican

Incumbent Republican Mac Warner is eligible to run for re-election, but has instead decided to run for governor.

Mac's brother and Former West Virginia Republican Party chair Kris Warner won the Republican nomination defeating state senator Kenny Mann, former state delegate Ken Reed, former Democratic House of Delegates minority leader Doug Skaff, and Putnam County clerk Brian Wood. Attorney Thornton Cooper won the Democratic nomination unopposed.

The Republican nominee, Kris Warner, was elected West Virginia's Secretary of State on November 5, 2024.

Republican primary results
Party	Candidate	Votes	%
Republican	Kris Warner	92,488	45.89%
Republican	Doug Skaff	42,291	20.98%
Republican	Ken Reed	33,891	16.81%
Republican	Brian Wood	32,892	16.32%
Total votes		201,562	100.00%

Democratic primary results
Party	Candidate	Votes	%
Democratic	Thornton Cooper	81,773	100.0%
Total votes		81,773	100.0%

2024 West Virginia Secretary of State election
Party	Candidate	Votes	%	±%
Republican	Kris Warner	510,992	71.15%	+12.89%
Democratic	Thornton Cooper	207,238	28.85%	−12.89%
Total votes		718,230	100.00%	
Republican hold				
