= 2028 United States secretary of state elections =

- November 7, 2028

7 secretary of state offices (Note: Seat tallies and popular vote do not include states that do not elect secretaries of state.)
	Majority party	Minority party
Party	Republican	Democratic
- Democratic incumbent Republican incumbent Term-limited Republican; No election

The 2028 United States secretary of state elections are scheduled to be held on November 7, 2028, to elect the secretary of state of seven U.S. states.

The previous secretary of state elections for this group of states took place in 2024. The secretary of state of Vermont serves two-year terms and will be elected in 2026.

These elections will take place concurrently with various other federal, state, and local elections.

== Race summary ==
State	Secretary of state	Party	First elected	Last race	Status	Candidates
Missouri	Denny Hoskins	Republican	2024	57.7% R	Incumbent's intent unknown	TBD
Montana	Christi Jacobsen	Republican	2020	61.4% R	Term-limited	TBD
North Carolina	Elaine Marshall	Democratic	1996	51.0% D	Incumbent's intent unknown	TBD
Oregon	Tobias Read	Democratic	2024	54.4% D	Incumbent's intent unknown	TBD
Vermont	Sarah Copeland Hanzas	Democratic	2022	59.2% D	Incumbent's intent unknown	TBD
Washington	Steve Hobbs	Democratic	2022 (special)	59.2% D	Incumbent's intent unknown	TBD
West Virginia	Kris Warner	Republican	2024	71.1% R	Incumbent's intent unknown	TBD

== Missouri ==
Secretary of State Denny Hoskins was elected in 2024 with 57.7% of the vote. He is eligible to run for re-election but has not yet stated if he will do so.

== Montana ==
Secretary of State Christi Jacobsen was re-elected in 2024 with 61.4% of the vote. She is term-limited and unable to run for re-election.

== North Carolina ==
Secretary of State Elaine Marshall was re-elected in 2024 with 51.0% of the vote. She is eligible to run for re-election but has not yet stated if she will do so. Though when asked about her 2028 plans, she stated she had no plans of retiring.

== Oregon ==
Secretary of State Tobias Read was elected in 2024 with 54.4% of the vote. He is eligible to run for re-election but has not yet stated if he will do so.

== Vermont ==
Secretary of State Sarah Copeland Hanzas was re-elected in 2026 with 59.2% of the vote. She is eligible to run for re-election but has not yet stated if she will do so.

== Washington ==
Secretary of State Steve Hobbs was re-elected in 2024 with 59.2% of the vote. He is eligible to run for re-election but has not yet stated if he will do so.

== West Virginia ==
Secretary of State Kris Warner was elected in 2024 with 71.1% of the vote. He is eligible to run for re-election but has not yet stated if he will do so.
