= 2020 United States secretary of state elections =

- November 3, 2020

7 secretary of state offices (Note: Seat tallies and popular vote do not include states that do not elect secretaries of state.)
	Majority party	Minority party
Party	Republican	Democratic
Seats before	22	13
Seats after	21	14
Seat change	▼1	▲1
Popular vote	8,422,210	7,575,999
Percentage	51.75%	46.55%
Seats up	5	2
Seats won	4	3
- Democratic hold Democratic gain Republican hold No election

The 2020 United States secretary of state elections were held on November 3, 2020, to elect the secretaries of state in seven states. These elections took place concurrently with several other federal, state, and local elections.

The previous elections for this group of states took place in 2016. The secretary of state of Vermont serves two-year terms and was last elected in 2018.

Going into the election, there were 26 Republican secretaries of state and 21 Democratic secretaries of state. 5 Republican secretaries of state were up for election, of whom Corey Stapleton of Montana and Bev Clarno of Oregon are retiring. 2 Democratic secretaries of state were up for election, both seeking re-election.

== Partisan composition ==
Going into these elections, this class of secretaries of state is made up of 5 Republicans and 2 Democrats. Republicans were defending two states won by Hillary Clinton in 2016 (Oregon and Washington), while Democrats are defending one state won by Donald Trump in 2016 (North Carolina).

== Election predictions ==
Several sites and individuals published predictions of competitive seats. These predictions looked at factors such as the strength of the incumbent (if the incumbent is running for re-election), the strength of the candidates, and the partisan leanings of the state (reflected in part by the state's Cook Partisan Voting Index rating). The predictions assigned ratings to each seat, with the rating indicating the predicted advantage that a party has in winning that seat.

Most election predictors use:

- "tossup": no advantage
- "tilt" (used by some predictors): advantage that is not quite as strong as "lean"
- "lean": slight advantage
- "likely": significant, but surmountable, advantage
- "safe" or "solid" : near-certain chance of victory

State	PVI	Incumbent	Last race	Cook June 25, 2024	Result
Missouri	R+9	Jay Ashcroft	57.6% R	Solid R	Ashcroft; 60.6% R
Montana	R+11	Corey Stapleton (retiring)	55.5% R	Lean R	Jacobsen; 59.6% R
North Carolina	R+3	Elaine Marshall	52.3% D	Likely D	Marshall; 51.2% D
Oregon	D+5	Bev Clarno (retiring)	Appointed (2019) (Note: Republican Dennis Richardson won with 47.1% of the vote in 2016 against Democratic nominee Brad Avakian, but died in office on February 26, 2019.)	Likely D (flip)	Fagan; 50.3% D (flip)
Vermont	D+15	Jim Condos	66.81% D	Solid D	Condos; 57.9% D
Washington	D+7	Kim Wyman	54.6% R	Lean R	Wyman; 50.9% R
West Virginia	R+19	Mac Warner	48.5% R	Likely R	Warner; 58.3% R

== Race summary ==
=== States ===
State	Secretary of state	Party	First elected	Result	Candidates
Missouri	Jay Ashcroft	Republican	2016	Incumbent re-elected.	▌ ✓ Jay Ashcroft (Republican) 60.6%; ▌Yinka Faleti (Democratic) 36.3%; Others: ▌Carl Herman Freese (Libertarian) 1.9%; ▌David Harding (Green) 0.8%; ▌Nancy Wallace (Constitution) 0.4%
Montana	Corey Stapleton	Republican	2016	Incumbent retired to run for U.S. House. New secretary of state elected. Republican hold.	▌ ✓ Christi Jacobsen (Republican) 59.6%; ▌Bryce Bennett (Democratic) 40.4%
North Carolina	Elaine Marshall	Democratic	1996	Incumbent re-elected.	▌ ✓ Elaine Marshall (Democratic) 51.2%; ▌E.C. Sykes (Republican) 48.8%
Oregon	Bev Clarno	Republican	2019 (appointed)	Interim appointee retiring. New secretary of state elected. Democratic gain.	▌ ✓ Shemia Fagan (Democratic) 50.3%; ▌Kim Thatcher (Republican) 43.2%; ▌ Nathalie Paravicini (Pacific Green) 3.6%; ▌Kyle Markley (Libertarian) 2.8%
Vermont	Jim Condos	Democratic	2010	Incumbent re-elected.	▌ ✓ Jim Condos (Democratic) 57.9%; ▌H. Brooke Paige (Republican) 26.8%; ▌Pamala Smith (Independent) 5.7%; ▌Cris Ericson (Progressive) 3.0%
Washington	Kim Wyman	Republican	2012	Incumbent re-elected.	▌ ✓ Kim Wyman (Republican) 50.9%; ▌Gael Tarleton (Democratic) 43.3%; ▌ Ed Minger (Independent) 3.6%; ▌Gentry Lange (Progressive) 2.1%
West Virginia	Mac Warner	Republican	2016	Incumbent re-elected.	▌ ✓ Mac Warner (Republican) 58.3%; ▌Natalie Tennant (Democratic) 41.7%

== Closest races ==
States where the margin of victory was under 5%:

1. North Carolina, 2.4%

States where the margin of victory was under 10%:

1. Oregon, 7.1%
2. Washington, 7.6%

Blue denotes races won by Democrats. Red denotes races won by Republicans.

== Missouri ==
2020 Missouri Secretary of State election
- November 3, 2020
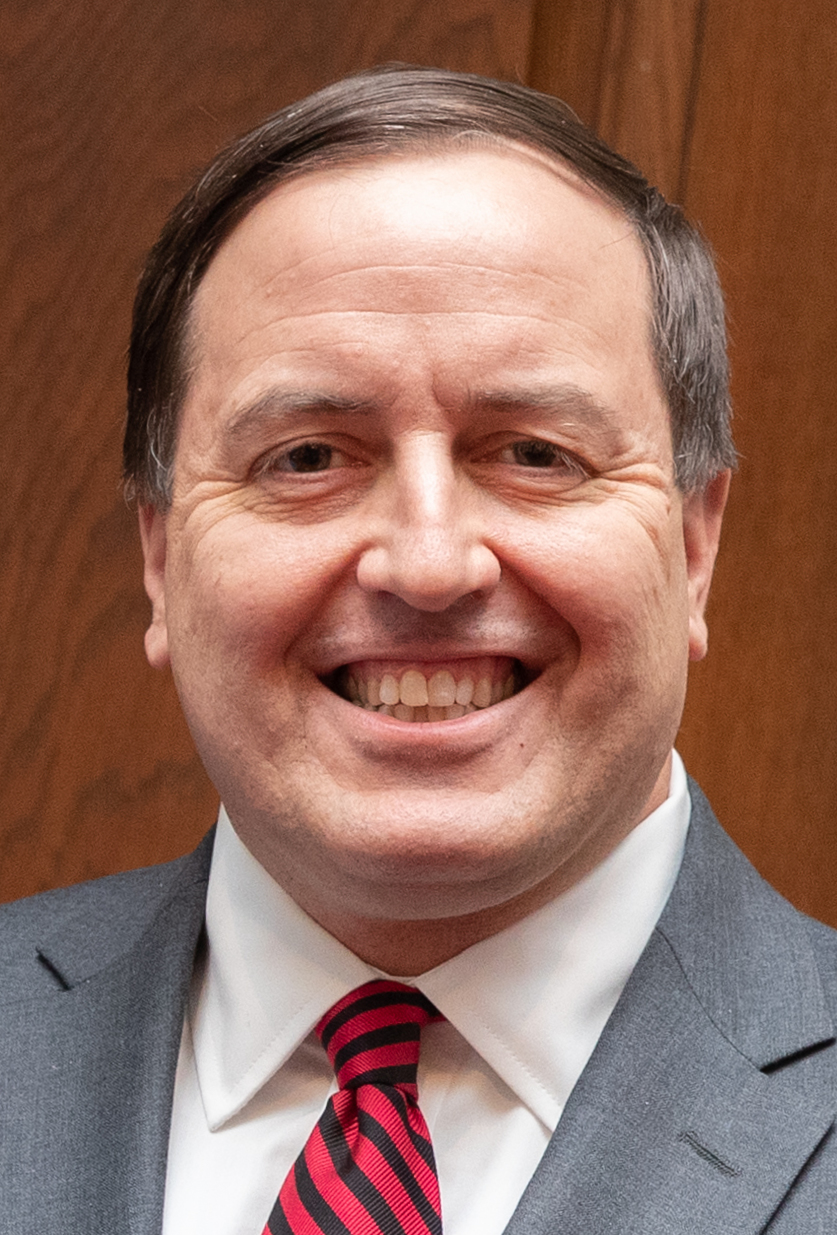

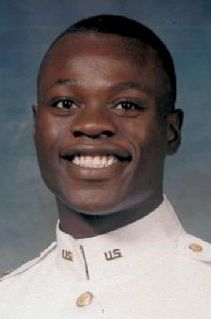
Nominee	Jay Ashcroft	Yinka Faleti
Party	Republican	Democratic
Popular vote	1,790,873	1,072,415
Percentage	60.6%	36.3%
- Ashcroft: 40–50% 50–60% 60–70% 70–80% 80–90% >90% Faleti: 40–50% 50–60% 60–70% 70–80% 80–90% >90%
Secretary of State before election
Jay Ashcroft
Republican
Elected Secretary of State
Jay Ashcroft
Republican

Incumbent secretary of state Jay Ashcroft ran and won re-election to a second term after he defeated Democratic nominee Yinka Faleti with 60.6% of the vote.

Republican primary results
Party	Candidate	Votes	%
Republican	Jay Ashcroft (incumbent)	620,822	100.0%
Total votes		620,822	100.0%

Democratic primary results
Party	Candidate	Votes	%
Democratic	Yinka Faleti	470,955	100.0%
Total votes		470,955	100.0%

Missouri Secretary of State election, 2020
Party	Candidate	Votes	%	±%
Republican	Jay Ashcroft (incumbent)	1,790,873	60.59%	+2.97%
Democratic	Yinka Faleti	1,072,415	36.28%	−2.17%
Libertarian	Carl Herman Freese	55,320	1.87%	−2.06%
Green	Paul Lehmann	23,981	0.81%	N/A
Constitution	Paul Venable	13,066	0.44%	N/A
Total votes		2,955,655	100.0%	

== Montana ==
2020 Montana Secretary of State election
- November 3, 2020

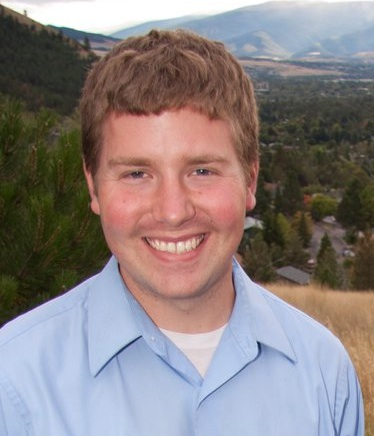
Nominee	Christi Jacobsen	Bryce Bennett
Party	Republican	Democratic
Popular vote	352,939	239,617
Percentage	59.6%	40.4%
- Jacobsen: 50–60% 60–70% 70–80% 80–90% >90% Bennett: 50–60% 60–70% 70–80% 80–90%
Secretary of State before election
Corey Stapleton
Republican
Elected Secretary of State
Christi Jacobsen
Republican

Incumbent Republican secretary of state Corey Stapleton was eligible to run for a second term but has decided to run for U.S. House instead. Former chief of staff to Stapleton, Christi Jacobsen won the Republican nomination defeating president of the Montana State Senate, Scott Sales and Montana Public Service Commissioner, Brad Johnson.

She went on to defeat Democratic state senator Bryce Bennett with 59.6% of the vote.

Republican primary results
Party	Candidate	Votes	%
Republican	Christi Jacobsen	57,941	29.4%
Republican	Scott Sales	49,759	25.3%
Republican	Brad Johnson	45,526	23.1%
Republican	Forrest Mandeville	20,318	10.3%
Republican	Bowen Greenwood	14,080	7.1%
Republican	Kurt Johnson	9,346	4.7%
Total votes		196,970	100.0%

Democratic primary results
Party	Candidate	Votes	%
Democratic	Bryce Bennett	130,109	100.0%
Total votes		130,109	100.0%

Montana Secretary of State election, 2020
Party	Candidate	Votes	%
Republican	Christi Jacobsen	352,939	59.56%
Democratic	Bryce Bennett	239,617	40.44%
Total votes		592,556	100.00%

== North Carolina ==
2020 North Carolina Secretary of State election
- November 3, 2020
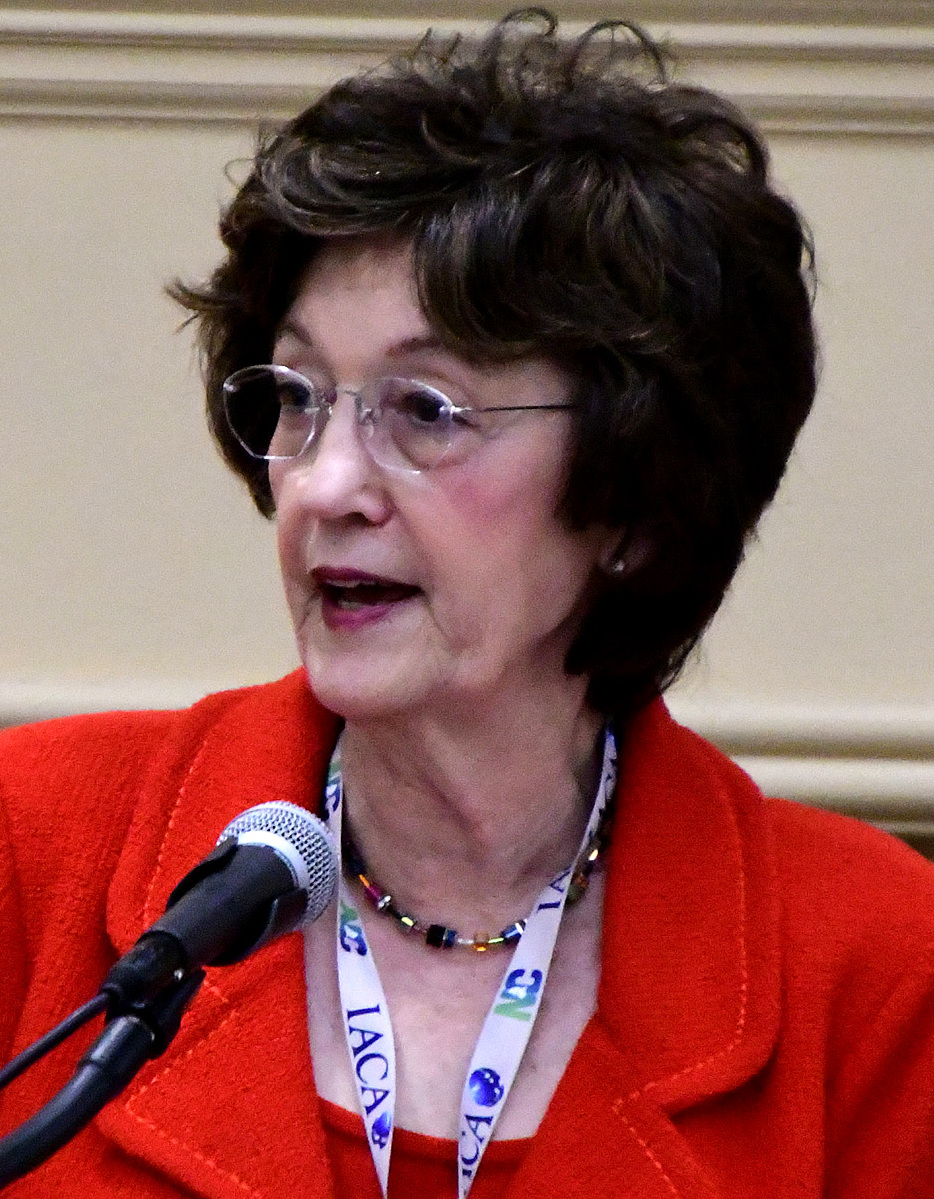

Nominee	Elaine Marshall	E.C. Sykes
Party	Democratic	Republican
Popular vote	2,755,571	2,630,559
Percentage	51.16%	48.84%
- Marshall: 50-60% 60-70% 70-80% 80–90% >90%; Sykes: 50-60% 60-70% 70-80% 80-90% >90%
Secretary of State before election
Elaine Marshall
Democratic
Elected Secretary of State
Elaine Marshall
Democratic

Incumbent Democrat Elaine Marshall won re-election to a seventh term after she defeated Republican nominee businessman E.C. Sykes with 51.2% of the vote.

Republican primary results
Party	Candidate	Votes	%
Republican	E.C. Sykes	296,457	42.9
Republican	Chad Brown	262,595	38.0
Republican	Michael LaPaglia	131,832	19.1
Total votes		690,884	100.0

North Carolina Secretary of State election, 2020
Party	Candidate	Votes	%	±%
Democratic	Elaine Marshall (incumbent)	2,755,571	51.16%	−1.10%
Republican	E.C. Sykes	2,630,559	48.84%	+1.10%
Total votes		5,386,130	100.0%	

== Oregon ==
2020 Oregon Secretary of State election
- November 3, 2020
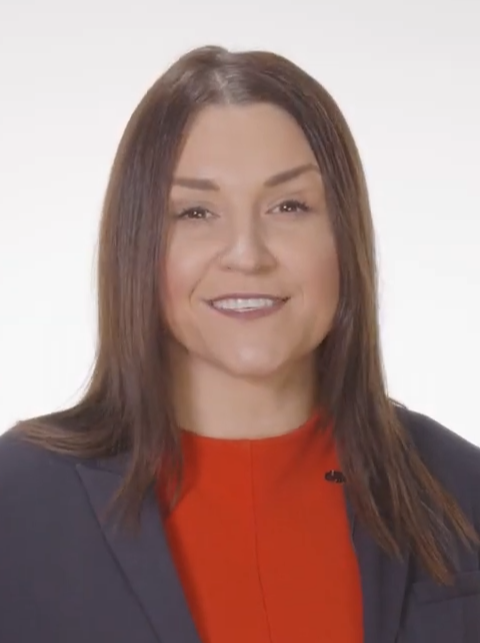

Nominee	Shemia Fagan	Kim Thatcher
Party	Democratic	Republican
Popular vote	1,146,370	984,587
Percentage	50.3%	43.2%
- Fagan: 40–50% 50–60% 60–70% 70–80% 80–90% >90% Thatcher: 40–50% 50–60% 60–70% 70–80% 80–90% >90%
Secretary of State before election
Bev Clarno
Republican
Elected Secretary of State
Shemia Fagan
Democratic

Incumbent Republican Bev Clarno had agreed not to run for a full term. Clarno was appointed by Governor Kate Brown to replace Dennis Richardson, who died of cancer during his term.

Republicans nominated state senator Kim Thatcher while Democrats nominated state senator Shemia Fagan.

Fagan defeated Thatcher with 50.3% of the vote.

Republican primary results
Party	Candidate	Votes	%
Republican	Kim Thatcher	312,296	85.62%
Republican	Dave Stauffer	48,839	13.39%
Write-in		3,625	0.99%
Total votes		364,760	100.0%

Democratic primary results
Party	Candidate	Votes	%
Democratic	Shemia Fagan	209,682	36.23%
Democratic	Mark Hass	205,230	35.46%
Democratic	Jamie McLeod-Skinner	159,430	27.55%
Write-in		4,395	0.76%
Total votes		578,737	100.0%

2020 Oregon Secretary of State election
Party	Candidate	Votes	%	±%
Democratic	Shemia Fagan	1,146,370	50.31%	+6.84%
Republican	Kim Thatcher	984,597	43.21%	−3.85%
Pacific Green	Nathalie Paravicini	82,211	3.61%	+1.06%
Libertarian	Kyle Markley	62,985	2.77%	+0.29%
Write-in		2,340	0.10%	-0.09%
Total votes		2,278,503	100.0%	

== Vermont ==
2020 Vermont Secretary of State election
- November 3, 2020
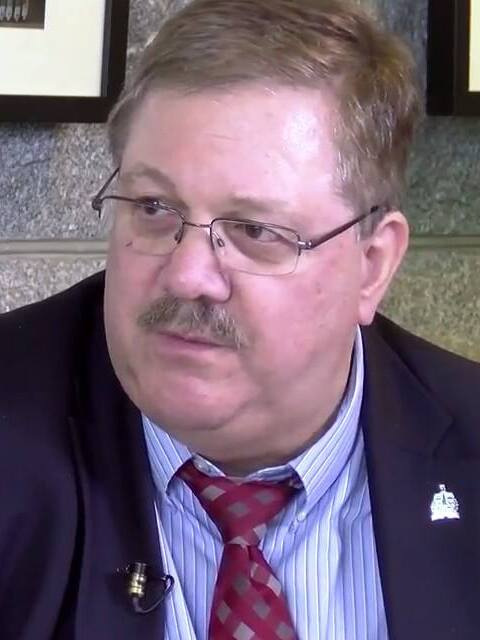

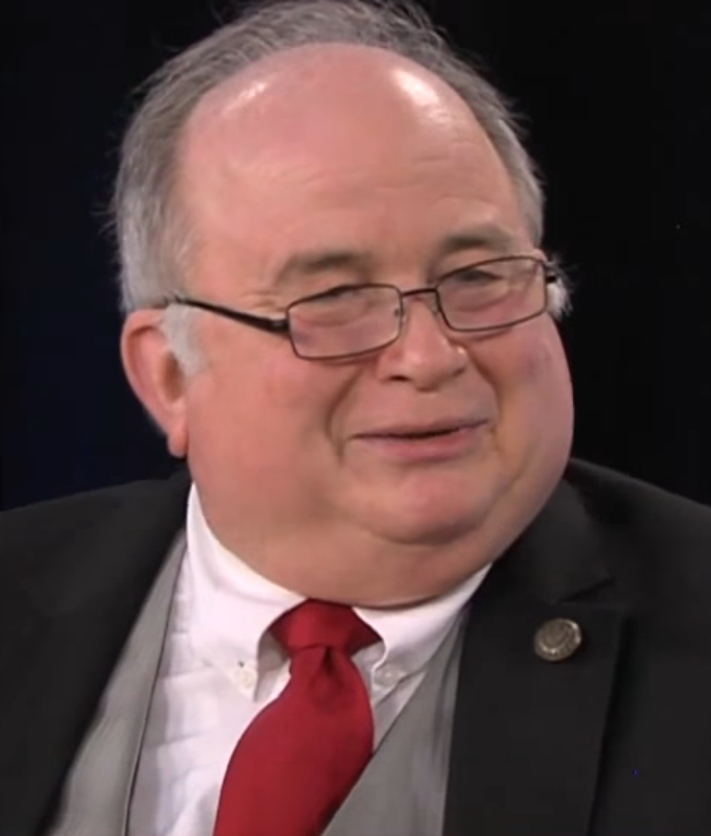

Nominee	Jim Condos	H. Brooke Paige	Pamala Smith
Party	Democratic	Republican	Independent
Popular vote	214,666	99,564	21,210
Percentage	57.87	26.84	5.72
Secretary of State before election
Jim Condos
Democratic
Elected Secretary of State
Jim Condos
Democratic

Incumbent Democratic secretary of state Jim Condos won re-election to a fifth term after he defeated Republican nominee H. Brooke Paige.

2020 Vermont Secretary of State election
Party	Candidate	Votes	%	±%
Democratic	Jim Condos (incumbent)	214,666	57.87%	−8.94
Republican	H. Brooke Paige	99,564	26.84%	−2.68
Independent	Pamala Smith	21,210	5.72%	+5.72%
Progressive	Cris Ericson	11,171	3.01%	+3.01%
Write-in		309	0.08%	+0.04%
Total votes		2,278,503	100.0%	

== Washington ==
2020 Washington Secretary of State election
- November 3, 2020
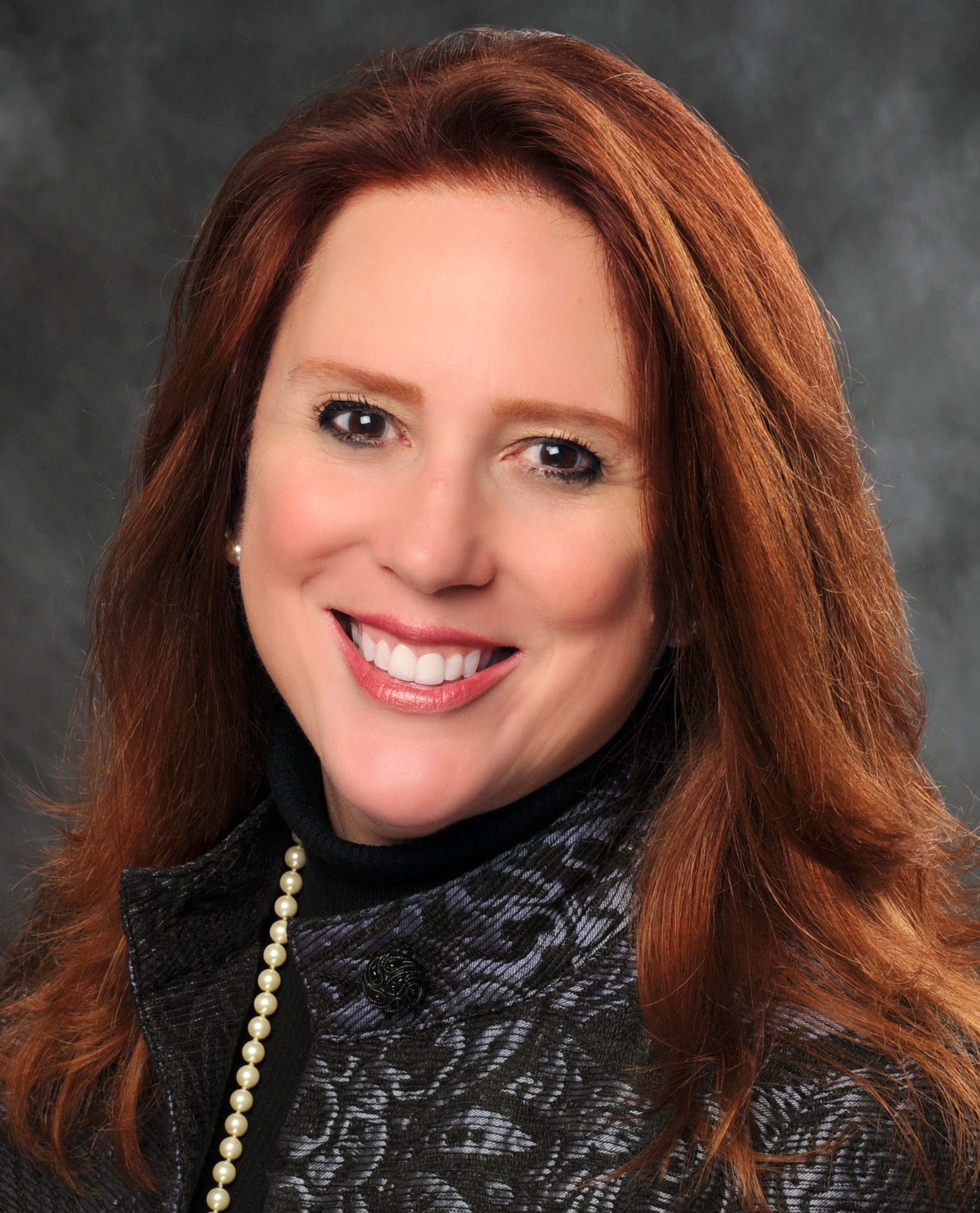

Nominee	Kim Wyman	Gael Tarleton
Party	Republican	Democratic
Popular vote	2,116,141	1,826,710
Percentage	53.6%	46.3%
- Wyman: 40–50% 50–60% 60–70% 70–80% 80–90% >90% Tarleton: 50–60% 60–70%
Secretary of State before election
Kim Wyman
Republican
Elected Secretary of State
Kim Wyman
Republican

Incumbent Republican secretary of state Kim Wyman won re-election to a second term after she defeated Democratic nominee Gael Tarleton with 53.6% of the vote.

Top-two primary results
Party	Candidate	Votes	%
Republican	Kim Wyman (incumbent)	1,238,455	50.89%
Democratic	Gael Tarleton	1,053,584	43.29%
Independent	Ed Minger	87,982	3.62%
Progressive	Gentry Lange	51,826	2.13%
Write-in		1,919	0.08%
Total votes		2,433,766	100.00%

2020 Washington Secretary of State election
Party	Candidate	Votes	%
Republican	Kim Wyman (incumbent)	2,116,141	53.61%
Democratic	Gael Tarleton	1,826,710	46.27%
Write-in		4,666	0.12%
Total votes		3,947,517	100.00%

== West Virginia ==
2020 West Virginia Secretary of State election
- November 3, 2020
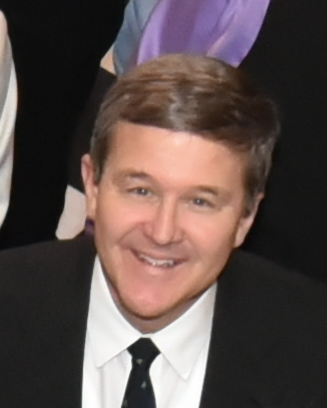

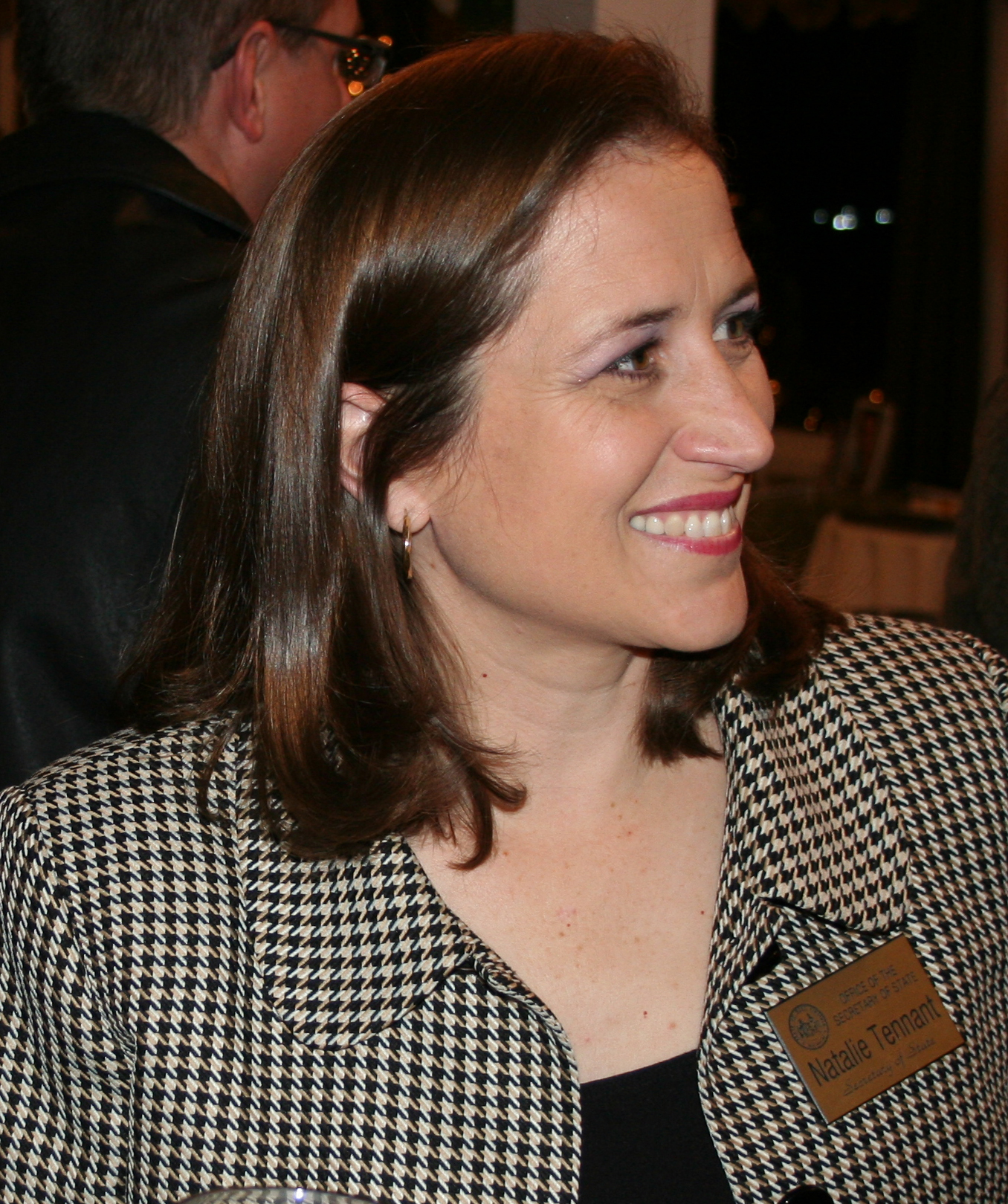
Nominee	Mac Warner	Natalie Tennant
Party	Republican	Democratic
Popular vote	447,537	320,650
Percentage	58.26%	41.74%
- Warner: 40–50% 50–60% 60–70% 70–80% 80–90% >90% Tennant: 50–60%
Secretary of State before election
Mac Warner
Republican
Elected Secretary of State
Mac Warner
Republican

Incumbent Republican secretary of state Mac Warner won re-election to a second term after he defeated former secretary of state Natalie Tennant with 53.3% of the vote.

Republican primary results
Party	Candidate	Votes	%
Republican	Mac Warner (incumbent)	176,915	100.0%
Total votes		176,915	100.0%

Democratic primary results
Party	Candidate	Votes	%
Democratic	Natalie Tennant	175,600	100.0%
Total votes		175,600	100.0%

General election results
Party	Candidate	Votes	%
Republican	Mac Warner (incumbent)	447,537	58.26%
Democratic	Natalie Tennant	320,650	41.74%
Total votes		768,187	100.0%
