= Bryce Bennett =

Bryce Bennett may refer to:

- Bryce Bennett (politician)
- Bryce Bennett (alpine skier)
