= 2020 Montana Secretary of State election =

- November 3, 2020

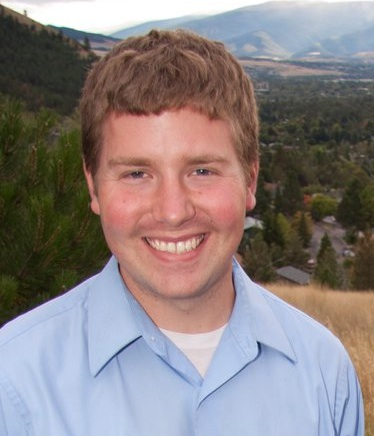
Nominee	Christi Jacobsen	Bryce Bennett
Party	Republican	Democratic
Popular vote	352,939	239,617
Percentage	59.6%	40.4%
- Jacobsen: 50–60% 60–70% 70–80% 80–90% >90% Bennett: 50–60% 60–70% 70–80% 80–90% >90% No data
Secretary of State before election
Corey Stapleton
Republican
Elected Secretary of State
Christi Jacobsen
Republican

The 2020 Montana Secretary of State election was held on November 3, 2020, to elect the secretary of state of the U.S. state of Montana. Incumbent Republican Montana Secretary of State Corey Stapleton was elected in 2016 with 55.5% of the vote. Stapleton announced he would not seek re-election, instead running unsuccessfully in the Republican primary for the open U.S. House seat in Montana.

== Republican primary ==
=== Candidates ===
==== Nominee ====
- Christi Jacobsen, chief of staff to Montana Secretary of State Corey Stapleton

==== Eliminated in primary ====
- Bowen Greenwood, clerk for the Montana State Supreme Court
- Brad Johnson, Montana Public Service Commissioner and former Montana Secretary of State (2005–2009)
- Kurt Johnson
- Forrest Mandeville, state representative
- Scott Sales, president of the Montana State Senate

==== Declined ====
- Corey Stapleton, incumbent Montana Secretary of State

=== Results ===
Primary results by county: Jacobsen: 20–30%; 30–40%; Sales: 20–30%; 30–40%; 40–50%; 50–60%; Johnson: 20–30%; 30–40%; Mandeville: 60–70%

Republican primary results
Party	Candidate	Votes	%
Republican	Christi Jacobsen	57,941	29.4%
Republican	Scott Sales	49,759	25.3%
Republican	Brad Johnson	45,526	23.1%
Republican	Forrest Mandeville	20,318	10.3%
Republican	Bowen Greenwood	14,080	7.1%
Republican	Kurt Johnson	9,346	4.7%
Total votes		196,970	100.0%

== Democratic primary ==
=== Candidates ===
==== Declared ====
- Bryce Bennett, state senator

=== Results ===
Democratic primary results
Party	Candidate	Votes	%
Democratic	Bryce Bennett	130,109	100.0%
Total votes		130,109	100.0%

== General election ==
=== Predictions ===
Source	Ranking	As of
The Cook Political Report	Lean R	June 25, 2020

=== Polling ===
Poll source	Date(s) administered	Sample size	Margin of error	Christi Jacobsen (R)	Bryce Bennett (D)	Undecided
Bryce Bennett	Released August 20–26, 2020	– (Note: Not yet released)	± 4.4%	39%	36%	22%

=== Results ===
2020 Montana Secretary of State election
Party	Candidate	Votes	%
Republican	Christi Jacobsen	352,939	59.56%
Democratic	Bryce Bennett	239,617	40.44%
Total votes		592,556	100.00%
Republican hold			

==== By county ====
County	Christi Jacobsen Republican		Bryce Bennett Democratic		Margin		Total
County	Votes	%	Votes	%	Votes	%	Total
Beaverhead	4,002	71.93%	1,562	28.07%	2,440	43.85%	5,564
Big Horn	2,168	45.84%	2,561	54.16%	-393	-8.31%	4,729
Blaine	1,454	47.21%	1,626	52.79%	-172	-5.58%	3,080
Broadwater	3,228	79.98%	808	20.02%	2,420	59.96%	4,036
Carbon	4,615	66.03%	2,374	33.97%	2,241	32.06%	6,989
Carter	765	90.96%	76	9.04%	689	81.93%	841
Cascade	23,816	61.04%	15,200	38.96%	8,616	22.08%	39,016
Chouteau	1,912	66.16%	978	33.84%	934	32.32%	2,890
Custer	4,235	73.50%	1,527	26.50%	2,708	47.00%	5,762
Daniels	779	79.98%	195	20.02%	584	59.96%	974
Dawson	3,716	78.63%	1,010	21.37%	2,706	57.26%	4,726
Deer Lodge	2,149	44.81%	2,647	55.19%	-498	-10.38%	4,796
Fallon	1,331	89.03%	164	10.97%	1,167	78.06%	1,495
Fergus	4,837	75.73%	1,550	24.27%	3,287	51.46%	6,387
Flathead	39,490	67.02%	19,434	32.98%	20,056	34.04%	58,924
Gallatin	33,796	48.84%	35,403	51.16%	-1,607	-2.32%	69,199
Garfield	741	94.04%	47	5.96%	694	88.07%	788
Glacier	1,861	33.04%	3,772	66.96%	-1,911	-33.93%	5,633
Golden Valley	407	83.06%	83	16.94%	324	66.12%	490
Granite	1,427	69.20%	635	30.80%	792	38.41%	2,062
Hill	4,061	57.40%	3,014	42.60%	1,047	14.80%	7,075
Jefferson	5,501	68.30%	2,553	31.70%	2,948	36.60%	8,054
Judith Basin	1,044	79.94%	262	20.06%	782	59.88%	1,306
Lake	9,603	58.83%	6,720	41.17%	2,883	17.66%	16,323
Lewis and Clark	22,535	53.94%	19,246	46.06%	3,289	7.87%	41,781
Liberty	805	76.38%	249	23.62%	556	52.75%	1,054
Lincoln	8,727	75.52%	2,829	24.48%	5,898	51.04%	11,556
Madison	4,280	71.19%	1,732	28.81%	2,548	42.38%	6,012
McCone	939	85.91%	154	14.09%	785	71.82%	1,093
Meagher	847	77.42%	247	22.58%	600	54.84%	1,094
Mineral	1,714	71.48%	684	28.52%	1,030	42.95%	2,398
Missoula	27,964	39.88%	42,153	60.12%	-14,189	-20.24%	70,117
Musselshell	2,403	85.00%	424	15.00%	1,979	70.00%	2,827
Park	6,198	54.38%	5,200	45.62%	998	8.76%	11,398
Petroleum	302	86.78%	46	13.22%	256	73.56%	348
Phillips	1,938	83.10%	394	16.90%	1,544	66.21%	2,332
Pondera	2,078	70.51%	869	29.49%	1,209	41.02%	2,947
Powder River	958	87.41%	138	12.59%	820	74.82%	1,096
Powell	2,377	75.51%	771	24.49%	1,606	51.02%	3,148
Prairie	574	80.62%	138	19.38%	436	61.24%	712
Ravalli	19,544	69.74%	8,479	30.26%	11,065	39.49%	28,023
Richland	4,698	83.28%	943	16.72%	3,755	66.57%	5,641
Roosevelt	2,000	50.72%	1,943	49.28%	57	1.45%	3,943
Rosebud	2,478	66.60%	1,243	33.40%	1,235	33.19%	3,721
Sanders	5,692	76.08%	1,790	23.92%	3,902	52.15%	7,482
Sheridan	1,393	71.88%	545	28.12%	848	43.76%	1,938
Silver Bow	7,701	41.91%	10,673	58.09%	-2,972	-16.18%	18,374
Stillwater	4,503	79.43%	1,166	20.57%	3,337	58.86%	5,669
Sweet Grass	1,901	78.52%	520	21.48%	1,381	57.04%	2,421
Teton	2,644	72.80%	988	27.20%	1,656	45.59%	3,632
Toole	1,600	77.03%	477	22.97%	1,123	54.07%	2,077
Treasure	370	81.68%	83	18.32%	287	63.36%	453
Valley	3,073	74.03%	1,078	25.97%	1,995	48.06%	4,151
Wheatland	803	76.55%	246	23.45%	557	53.10%	1,049
Wibaux	494	85.47%	84	14.53%	410	70.93%	578
Yellowstone	52,468	63.71%	29,884	36.29%	22,584	27.42%	82,352
Totals	352,939	59.56%	239,617	40.44%	113,322	19.12%	592,556

Counties that flipped from Republican to Democratic

- Gallatin (largest city: Bozeman)

Counties that flipped from Democratic to Republican

- Lewis and Clark (largest city: Helena)
- Roosevelt (largest city: Wolf Point)

== See also ==
- 2020 Montana elections
- 2020 United States presidential election in Montana
- 2020 Montana gubernatorial election
- 2020 United States Senate election in Montana
- 2020 United States House of Representatives election in Montana
