= 2026 Vermont Secretary of State election =

- November 3, 2026
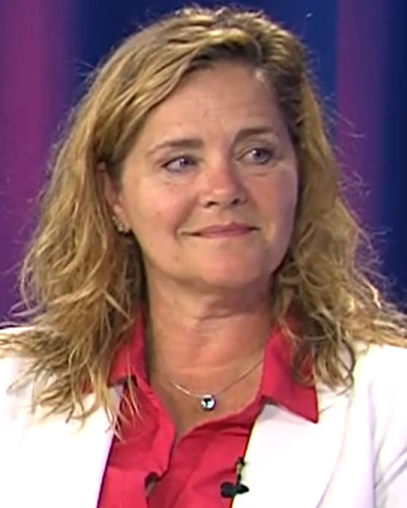

Nominee	Sarah Copeland Hanzas	H. Brooke Paige	Rachel Shaw
Party	Democratic	Republican	Progressive
Popular vote	174,741	96,149	24,006
Percentage	59.21%	32.58%	8.13%
Secretary of State before election
Sarah Copeland Hanzas
Democratic
Elected Secretary of State
Sarah Copeland Hanzas
Democratic

The 2026 Vermont Secretary of State election was held on November 3, 2026, to elect the Secretary of State of Vermont. Primary elections took place on August 11, 2026.

Incumbent Democratic secretary of state Sarah Copeland Hanzas, who was re-elected in 2024 with 59.6% of the vote, won re-election to a third term in office defeating Republican nominee H. Brooke Paige.

== Democratic primary ==
=== Candidates ===
==== Nominee ====
- Sarah Copeland Hanzas, incumbent secretary of state

=== Endorsements ===
Sarah Copeland Hanzas

Labor unions

- Vermont State Labor Council, AFL-CIO

Organizations

- EMILY's List
- Sierra Club Vermont

=== Results ===
Democratic primary results
Party	Candidate	Votes	%
Democratic	Sarah Copeland Hanzas (incumbent)	72,355	98.7
Write-in		972	1.3
Total votes		73,327	100.0

== Republican primary ==
=== Candidates ===
==== Nominee ====
- H. Brooke Paige, newsstand owner and perennial candidate

=== Results ===
Republican primary results
Party	Candidate	Votes	%
Republican	H. Brooke Paige	17,542	97.4
Write-in		467	2.6
Total votes		18,009	100.0

== Progressive primary ==
=== Candidates ===
==== Nominee ====
- Rachel Shaw

Progressive primary results
Party	Candidate	Votes	%
Progressive	Rachel Shaw	320	86.0
Write-in		52	14.0
Total votes		372	100.0

== General election ==
=== Results ===
2026 Vermont Secretary of State election
Party	Candidate	Votes	%	±%
Democratic	Sarah Copeland Hanzas (incumbent)	174,741	59.21	−0.40
Republican	H. Brooke Paige	96,149	32.58	−7.67
Progressive	Rachel Shaw	24,006	8.13	
Write-in		234	0.08	
Total votes		295,130	100.0	
Democratic hold				
