= 2016 Montana Secretary of State election =

- November 8, 2016
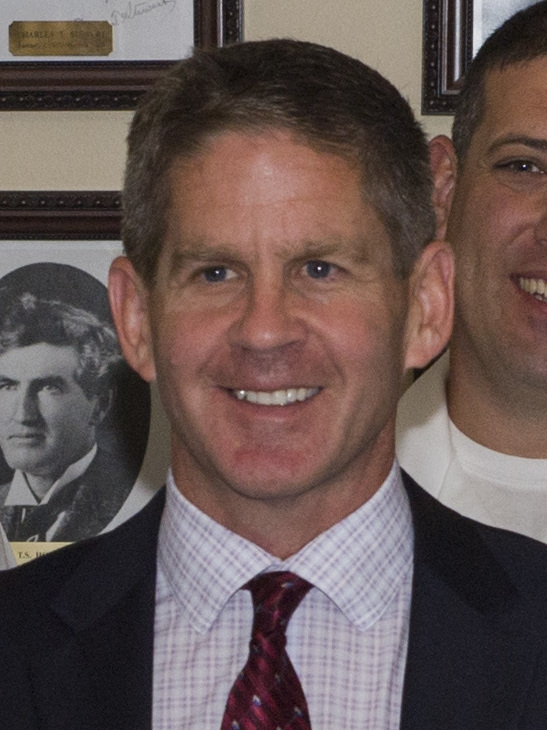

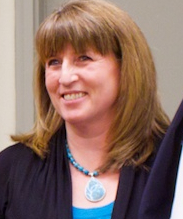
Nominee	Corey Stapleton	Monica Lindeen
Party	Republican	Democratic
Popular vote	277,473	204,861
Percentage	55.49%	40.97%
- County results Stapleton: 40–50% 50–60% 60–70% 70–80% 80–90% Lindeen: 50–60% 60–70%
Secretary of State before election
Linda McCulloch
Democratic
Elected Secretary of State
Corey Stapleton
Republican

The 2016 Montana Secretary of State election was held on November 8, 2016, in order to elect the Secretary of State of Montana. Republican nominee and former member of the Montana Senate from the 27th district Corey Stapleton won the election against Democratic nominee and incumbent Auditor of Montana Monica Lindeen and Libertarian Roger Roots.

== Democratic primary ==
Democratic primary
Party	Candidate	Votes	%
Democratic	Monica Lindeen	111,525	100.00
Total votes		111,525	100.00

== Republican primary ==
Republican primary
Party	Candidate	Votes	%
Republican	Corey Stapleton	137,252	100.00
Total votes		137,252	100.00

== General election ==
On election day, November 8, 2016, Republican nominee Corey Stapleton was elected by a margin of 72,612 votes against his foremost opponent Democratic nominee Monica Lindeen, gaining Republican control of the Secretary of State's office. Stapleton was sworn in on January 2, 2017.

=== Results ===
Montana Secretary of State election, 2016
Party	Candidate	Votes	%
Republican	Corey Stapleton	277,473	55.49
Democratic	Monica Lindeen	204,861	40.97
Libertarian	Roger Roots	17,687	3.54
Total votes		500,021	100.00
Republican gain from Democratic			
