= 2024 Montana Secretary of State election =

- November 5, 2024
Nominee	Christi Jacobsen	Jesse Mullen
Party	Republican	Democratic
Popular vote	364,319	210,651
Percentage	61.39%	35.49%
- Jacobsen: 40–50% 50–60% 60–70% 70–80% 80–90% >90% Mullen: 40–50% 50–60%
Secretary of State before election
Christi Jacobsen
Republican
Elected Secretary of State
Christi Jacobsen
Republican

The 2024 Montana Secretary of State election was held on November 5, 2024, to elect the next secretary of state of Montana, concurrently with the 2024 U.S. presidential election, as well as elections to the U.S. Senate and various state and local elections, including for U.S. House and governor of Montana. Incumbent Republican secretary of state Christi Jacobsen was re-elected to a second term, defeating Democratic challenger Jesse Mullen.

Primary elections took place on June 4, 2024.

== Republican primary ==
=== Candidates ===
==== Nominee ====
- Christi Jacobsen, incumbent secretary of state

=== Endorsements ===
Christi Jacobsen

Organizations

- National Right to Life Committee

=== Results ===
Republican primary results
Party	Candidate	Votes	%
Republican	Christi Jacobsen (incumbent)	163,359	100.00%
Total votes		163,359	100.00%

== Democratic primary ==
=== Candidates ===
==== Nominee ====
- Jesse Mullen, newspaper owner

=== Results ===
Democratic primary results
Party	Candidate	Votes	%
Democratic	Jesse Mullen	92,149	100.00%
Total votes		92,149	100.00%

== Libertarian primary ==
=== Candidates ===
==== Nominee ====
- John Lamb, attorney and nominee for Montana's 1st congressional district in 2022

== General election ==
=== Predictions ===
Source	Ranking	As of
Sabato's Crystal Ball	Safe R	July 25, 2024

=== Polling ===
Poll source	Date(s) administered	Sample size (Note: Key: A – all adults RV – registered voters LV – likely voters V – unclear)	Margin of error	Christi Jacobsen (R)	Jesse Mullen (D)	Other	Undecided
Public Opinion Strategies (R) (Note: Poll sponsored by the Montana Republican Party)	September 29 - October 1, 2024	500 (LV)	± 4.34%	48%	31%	9% (Note: Lamb (L) with 6%; "Won't Vote" with 1%; "Other" with 1%; "Refused" with 1%)	14%

=== Results ===
2024 Montana Secretary of State election
Party	Candidate	Votes	%	±%
Republican	Christi Jacobsen (incumbent)	364,319	61.39%	+1.83
Democratic	Jesse Mullen	210,651	35.49%	–4.95
Libertarian	John Lamb	18,500	3.12%	N/A
Total votes		593,470	100.00%	N/A
Republican hold				

==== By county ====
County	Christi Jacobsen Republican		Jesse Mullen Democratic		John Lamb Libertarian		Margin		Total
County	Votes	%	Votes	%	Votes	%	Votes	%	Total
Beaverhead	4,249	74.61%	1,255	22.04%	191	3.35%	2,994	52.57%	5,695
Big Horn	2,127	48.01%	2,160	48.76%	143	3.23%	-33	-0.74%	4,430
Blaine	1,467	48.72%	1,435	47.66%	109	3.62%	32	1.06%	3,011
Broadwater	3,841	80.91%	763	16.07%	143	3.01%	3,078	64.84%	4,747
Carbon	4,922	67.64%	2,143	29.45%	212	2.91%	2,779	38.19%	7,277
Carter	766	91.30%	56	6.67%	17	2.03%	710	84.62%	839
Cascade	23,533	63.50%	12,377	33.40%	1,148	3.10%	11,156	30.10%	37,058
Chouteau	1,988	69.00%	832	28.88%	61	2.12%	1,156	40.12%	2,881
Custer	4,217	74.05%	1,238	21.74%	240	4.21%	2,979	52.31%	5,695
Daniels	779	84.31%	129	13.96%	16	1.73%	650	70.35%	924
Dawson	3,586	79.07%	814	17.95%	135	2.98%	2,772	61.12%	4,535
Deer Lodge	2,302	47.74%	2,382	49.40%	138	2.86%	-80	-1.66%	4,822
Fallon	1,295	88.70%	137	9.38%	28	1.92%	1,158	79.32%	1,460
Fergus	5,118	77.19%	1,313	19.80%	199	3.00%	3,805	57.39%	6,630
Flathead	42,407	68.30%	17,909	28.84%	1,773	2.86%	24,498	39.46%	62,089
Gallatin	34,808	50.89%	31,303	45.77%	2,282	3.34%	3,505	5.12%	68,393
Garfield	737	94.61%	29	3.72%	13	1.67%	708	90.89%	779
Glacier	1,910	37.83%	2,975	58.92%	164	3.25%	-1,065	-21.09%	5,049
Golden Valley	448	87.16%	56	10.89%	10	1.95%	392	76.26%	514
Granite	1,537	71.82%	548	25.61%	55	2.57%	989	46.21%	2,140
Hill	4,048	60.44%	2,395	35.76%	254	3.79%	1,653	24.68%	6,697
Jefferson	5,744	69.77%	2,231	27.10%	258	3.13%	3,513	42.67%	8,233
Judith Basin	1,087	80.76%	220	16.34%	39	2.90%	867	64.41%	1,346
Lake	10,206	61.30%	5,937	35.66%	505	3.03%	4,269	25.64%	16,648
Lewis and Clark	23,002	55.20%	17,359	41.66%	1,307	3.14%	5,643	13.54%	41,668
Liberty	795	80.63%	169	17.14%	22	2.23%	626	63.49%	986
Lincoln	8,926	76.96%	2,330	20.09%	342	2.95%	6,596	56.87%	11,598
Madison	4,712	74.08%	1,422	22.35%	227	3.57%	3,290	51.72%	6,361
McCone	932	87.43%	108	10.13%	26	2.44%	824	77.30%	1,066
Meagher	913	78.77%	201	17.34%	45	3.88%	712	61.43%	1,159
Mineral	2,047	73.79%	610	21.99%	117	4.22%	1,437	51.80%	2,774
Missoula	29,086	40.64%	40,162	56.11%	2,328	3.25%	-11,076	-15.47%	71,576
Musselshell	2,576	86.59%	320	10.76%	79	2.66%	2,256	75.83%	2,975
Park	6,327	54.74%	4,818	41.69%	413	3.57%	1,509	13.06%	11,558
Petroleum	284	87.65%	31	9.57%	9	2.78%	253	78.09%	324
Phillips	1,804	83.13%	323	14.88%	43	1.98%	1,481	68.25%	2,170
Pondera	2,070	73.80%	673	23.99%	62	2.21%	1,397	49.80%	2,805
Powder River	943	87.31%	110	10.19%	27	2.50%	833	77.13%	1,080
Powell	2,454	75.46%	677	20.82%	121	3.72%	1,777	54.64%	3,252
Prairie	560	83.33%	98	14.58%	14	2.08%	462	68.75%	672
Ravalli	21,009	71.47%	7,610	25.89%	777	2.64%	13,399	45.58%	29,396
Richland	4,307	83.73%	678	13.18%	159	3.09%	3,629	70.55%	5,144
Roosevelt	1,988	51.76%	1,708	44.47%	145	3.78%	280	7.29%	3,841
Rosebud	2,470	67.67%	1,068	29.26%	112	3.07%	1,402	38.41%	3,650
Sanders	6,157	77.45%	1,534	19.30%	259	3.26%	4,623	58.15%	7,950
Sheridan	1,346	74.16%	415	22.87%	54	2.98%	931	51.29%	1,815
Silver Bow	8,578	48.00%	8,658	48.45%	635	3.55%	-80	-0.45%	17,871
Stillwater	4,746	80.84%	943	16.06%	182	3.10%	3,803	64.78%	5,871
Sweet Grass	1,824	77.85%	446	19.04%	73	3.12%	1,378	58.81%	2,343
Teton	2,669	75.61%	776	21.98%	85	2.41%	1,893	53.63%	3,530
Toole	1,605	79.81%	344	17.11%	62	3.08%	1,261	62.71%	2,011
Treasure	378	86.30%	47	10.73%	13	2.97%	331	75.57%	438
Valley	3,044	76.10%	808	20.20%	148	3.70%	2,236	55.90%	4,000
Wheatland	851	79.61%	190	17.77%	28	2.62%	661	61.83%	1,069
Wibaux	450	84.91%	65	12.26%	15	2.83%	385	72.64%	530
Yellowstone	52,344	65.35%	25,313	31.60%	2,438	3.04%	27,031	33.75%	80,095
Totals	364,319	61.39%	210,651	35.49%	18,500	3.12%	153,668	25.89%	593,470

==== Counties that flipped from Democratic to Republican ====
- Blaine (largest city: Chinook)
- Gallatin (largest city: Bozeman)

==== By congressional district ====
Jacobsen won both congressional districts.

District	Jacobsen	Mullen	Representative
1st	57%	40%	Ryan Zinke
2nd	66%	31%	Matt Rosendale (118th Congress)
2nd	66%	31%	Troy Downing (119th Congress)

== Notes ==
Partisan clients
