= Robin Hamilton (politician) =

American politician

Member of the Montana House of Representatives from the 92nd district
- In office January 3, 2005 – January 3, 2011
- Succeeded by: Bryce Bennett

Personal details
- Party: Democratic Party

Robin Hamilton is a former Democratic Party member of the Montana House of Representatives, representing District 92 from January 2005 to January 2011. He did not seek re-election in 2010 and was succeeded by Democrat Bryce Bennett.
