= 2020 Montana elections =

- November 3, 2020

A general election in the state of Montana was held on Tuesday, November 3, 2020. One seat in the United States House of Representatives, one seat in the United States Senate, and all five state constitutional offices were up for election. Additionally half of the seats in the Montana Senate, all of the Montana House of Representatives, various local offices and ballot measures were up for election. The primary election was on June 2, 2020.

== Federal elections ==
=== President ===
2020 United States presidential election in Montana
Party	Candidate	Votes	%	±%
Republican	Donald Trump Mike Pence	343,602	56.92	+0.75
Democratic	Joe Biden Kamala Harris	244,786	40.55	+4.80
Libertarian	Jo Jorgensen Spike Cohen	15,252	2.53	−3.11
Total votes		603,640	100%	
Republican win				

=== Congress ===
==== Senate ====
Incumbent Republican Steve Daines won re-election against former Governor Steve Bullock.

==== House of Representatives ====
In the general election, Republican state auditor Matt Rosendale defeated former Democratic state representative Kathleen Williams.

== Governor ==
Incumbent Representative Greg Gianforte was elected in 2018 with 50.9% of the vote. Gianforte announced he would not seek re-election, instead successfully ran for governor. He defeated incumbent lieutenant governor Mike Cooney with 54.3% of the vote.

== Secretary of State ==
Incumbent Republican Montana Secretary of State Corey Stapleton was elected in 2016 with 55.5% of the vote. Stapleton announced he would not seek re-election, instead he ran for the open U.S. House seat in Montana. Republican Christi Jacobsen defeated Democrat Bryce Bennett.

== Attorney general ==
Incumbent Republican Montana Attorney General Tim Fox was re-elected in 2016 with 67.7% of the vote. Fox was term-limited and could not run for re-election. Republican Austin Knudsen defeated Democrat Raph Graybill.

== Montana State Senate ==
25 of the 50 seats in the Montana Senate were up for election in 2020.

== Montana State House ==
All 100 seats in the Montana House of Representatives were up for election in 2020.

== Public Service Commission ==
Three of five seats on the Montana Public Service Commission - Districts 2, 3 and 4 - were up for election. In District 2, Republican Tony O'Donnell defeated Democrat Valerie McMurtry. Republican James Brown won District 3 over Democrat Tom Woods. District 4 was taken by Republican Jennifer Fielder against Democrat Monica Tranel.

== State Auditor ==
Incumbent Republican Montana State Auditor Matt Rosendale was elected in 2016 with 53.8% of the vote. Rosendale announced he would not seek re-election, instead opting to run for the open U.S. House seat in Montana.

Republican Troy Downing defeated Democrat Shane Morigeau and Libertarian Roger Roots.

== Superintendent of Public Instruction ==
Incumbent Republican Montana Superintendent of Public Instruction Elsie Arntzen was elected in 2016 with 51.6% of the vote. In 2020, she defeated Democrat Melissa Romano and Libertarian Kevin Leatherbarrow.

== Supreme Court ==
The terms of Montana Supreme Court justices for Seats 5 and 6 expired at the end of 2020. Incumbent Laurie McKinnon was successful in retaining her seat against challenger Mike Black. Incumbent Jim Shea was unopposed.

== Ballot measures ==
=== Montana C-46 ===
Montana C-46 was an amendment to the constitution proposed by the legislature. This was a result of House Bill No. 244. The change would require anyone who proposed a constitutional amendment to obtain signatures of at least ten percent of the qualified voters in two-fifths of the legislative districts. This did not change existing requirements, rather it amended constitutional language to match existing signature distribution requirements for initiated constitutional amendments. The amendment passed with 76% voting yes.

=== Montana C-47 ===
Montana C-47 was an amendment to the constitution proposed by the legislature. This was a result of House Bill No. 245. Under this amendment petitions for citizen ballot initiatives must be signed by at least five percent of the qualified electors in one third of the legislative districts. This did not change existing enforced initiative signature distribution requirements, rather it amended constitutional language to match. The amendment passed with 74% voting yes.

=== Montana CI-118 ===
Montana CI-118 was a constitutional amendment proposed by initiative petition. The amendment would allow for the legislature or a citizen initiative to establish a minimum legal age for the possession, use, and purchase of marijuana. This initiative, as well as Montana I-190 which would legalize marijuana use, were led by New Approach Montana. The amendment passed with 57% voting yes.

=== Montana LR-130 ===
This referendum was referred by the state legislature through House Bill 357. The reform would limit local government's authority to regulate firearms. It was narrowly passed with 51% voting yes.

=== Montana I-190 ===
Montana I-190 was a law proposed by initiative petition. It was to legalize the possession and use of limited amounts of marijuana for adults over the age of 21. The initiative passed with 56% voting yes.

=== Initiative 190 ===
Poll source	Date(s) administered	Sample size (Note: Key: A – all adults RV – registered voters LV – likely voters V – unclear)	Margin of error	For	Against	Undecided / Other	
MSU Billings	Oct. 19–24, 2020	546 (LV)	± 4.2%	54%	38%	7%	–
MSU Bozeman	Sept. 14 – Oct. 2, 2020	1,607 (LV)	± 3.9%	49%	39%	10%	2% (Note: Would not vote with 2%)

=== Legalization of recreational marijuana ===
Poll source	Date(s) administered	Sample size	Margin of error	Yes	No	Undecided
University of Montana	Feb. 21 – Mar. 1, 2019	293 (RV)	± 5.7%	51%	37%	12%
University of Montana	Feb. 12–22, 2020	498 (LV)	± 4.39%	54%	37%	9%

On Legislative Referendum 130

Poll source	Date(s) administered	Sample size	Margin of error	Yes (for the amendment)	No (against the amendment)	Undecided
Montana State University Billings	October 19–24, 2020	546 (LV)	± 4.2%	52%	36%	12%

Legislative Referendum 130 Results by county Yes: 60–70%; 50–60%; No: 50–60%

C-46 Results by county Yes: 80–90%; 70–80%; 60–70%

C-47 Results by county Yes: 70–80%; 60–70%; 50–60%

Initiative 118 Results by county Yes: 60–70%; 50–60%; No: 60–70%; 50–60%

== Notes ==
Partisan clients
