= Jesse Mullen =

American businessman and politician

Personal details
- Born: Jesse James Mullen; April 14, 1984 (age 42) Deer Lodge, Montana, U.S.
- Party: Democratic
- Education: University of Wyoming

Jesse James Mullen is an American publisher, politician, and columnist based in Montana. He owns newspapers and book stores. He is the founder of Mullen Newspaper Company, a media company headquartered in Deer Lodge, Montana. Mullen Newspaper Company owns community newspapers in Colorado, Idaho, Kansas, Montana, Nebraska, and Washington. He was a candidate for Montana Secretary of State. He was a member of the Montana Democratic Party Executive Board.

== Early life and education ==
Mullen attended Newcastle High School, in Newcastle, Wyoming, then studied journalism at the University of Wyoming.

== Journalism career ==
Mullen worked at various newspapers including The Boomerang, in Laramie, Wyoming and Rawlins Daily Times, in Rawlins, Wyoming.

In 2013, Mullen worked with Civitas Media as an efficiency management expert to manage the editorial consolidation at the Wilkes-Barre, Pennsylvania Times Leader; Alton, Illinois Telegraph; Sedalia (Missouri) Democrat; Lima (Ohio) News; Mt. Airy (North Carolina) News; and Lumberton, North Carolina Robesonian.

In 2014, at age 29, he was named one of Editor & Publisher’s 25 most influential executives in the newspaper industry.

In 2015, the Mullen family was featured in the Smithsonian National Postal Museum exhibit “America’s Mailing Industry.”

Mullen is the founder of Mullen Newspaper Company. Mullen was a contributing author to editor Shannon Shelton Miller's "The Dayton Anthology" which reflected on the "traumas and longer-term ills of disinvestment and decay that have plagued [Rust Belt cities]," published by Belt Publishing.

== Mullen Newspaper Company ==
In 2020, Mullen purchased the Bitterroot Star. In 2021, he purchased the St. Maries (Idaho) Gazette-Record. In late 2021, Jesse and his brother, Lloyd Mullen, purchased the Johnson Newspaper Group in Nebraska and Colorado, Kavanagh Newspaper Group in Montana, and Nor’West Publications in Kansas, including the daily newspaper Colby Free Press. Lloyd is part-owner of the Port Townsend (Washington) Leader.

As of 2023, Mullen Newspaper Company manages 20 publications in six Western states.

== Politics ==
Mullen was a candidate for Montana's Secretary of State office ultimately losing to Republican incumbent Christi Jacobsen in the general election.

Mullen was a member of the Montana Democratic Party Executive Board as an at-large member representing the western district. He was elected on July 22, 2023. Mullen resigned from the Executive Board in September 2024 citing a "lack of transparency" regarding the Montana Democratic Party's budgeting and "troubling comments" made by Party employees regarding the budget. This resulted in the Montana Democratic Party removing Mullen from Democratic Party promotional materials in the final weeks of the election.

In early 2022, Senate District 39 Democratic Senator Mark Sweeney died of a heart attack. Mullen was nominated during a special convention to be the Democratic Party nominee to fill the remainder of Sweeney's term, defeating Jessica Wicks, and former state Rep. Gordon Pierson. Mullen lost the special election to Republican nominee and Deer Lodge County Commissioner Terry Vermeire.

Jessica Wicks was appointed by the Deer Lodge County Commissioners to briefly fill the vacant senate seat until the election could take place in November.

== Personal life ==
Mullen owns the Montana bookstore chain, Browsing Bison Books.
