= Washington Progressive Party =

- Founded: 2002; 24 years ago
- Dissolved: 2023; 3 years ago
- Headquarters: Bow, Washington
- Ideology: Progressivism; Democratic socialism Left-wing populism
- Political position: Left-wing
- Colors: Red
- Seats in the U.S. Senate: 0 / 2
- Seats in the U.S. House: 0 / 10
- Statewide Executive Offices: 0 / 8
- Seats in the State Senate: 0 / 49
- Seats in the State House: 0 / 98

The Washington Progressive Party (WAPP) is or was a minor political party in Washington state. The chair of the party in 2021 was Ashley Stallworth accompanied, by vice-chair Stephanie Browne. The party advocated for leftist politics and policies including Medicare for All as Single-payer healthcare and the Green New Deal. It had three candidates running under its name in 2020, Kathryn Lewandowsky for state senate in Legislative District 39, Taylor Zimmerman for state representative in Legislative District 10, and Gentry Lange for Secretary of State of Washington.

== Political positions ==
=== Healthcare ===
The WAPP supports universal, single-payer healthcare, and abortion rights.

=== Education ===
The WAPP supports universal pre-kindergarten, tuition-free public colleges and universities, Education in American Sign Language, Education in both English and a person's first language, Free lunch, Free school transportation, school mental health services, changing class sizes and hiring more teachers.

=== Housing ===
The WAPP supports an increase in public investment to create affordable housing, as well as rent control, housing subsidies, supportive services for renters, updating housing codes to include unconventional and wheeled housing and they oppose homeless sweeps. All with the goal to eliminate involuntary homelessness.
