= 2024 Vermont Secretary of State election =

- November 5, 2024
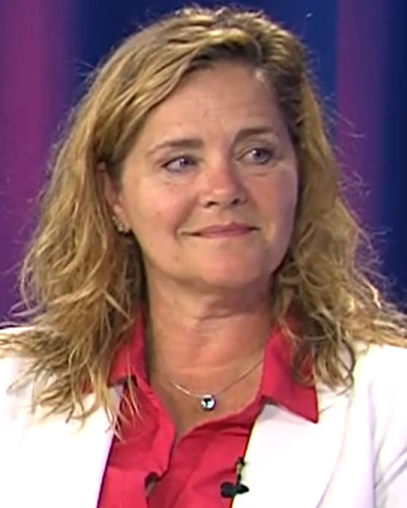

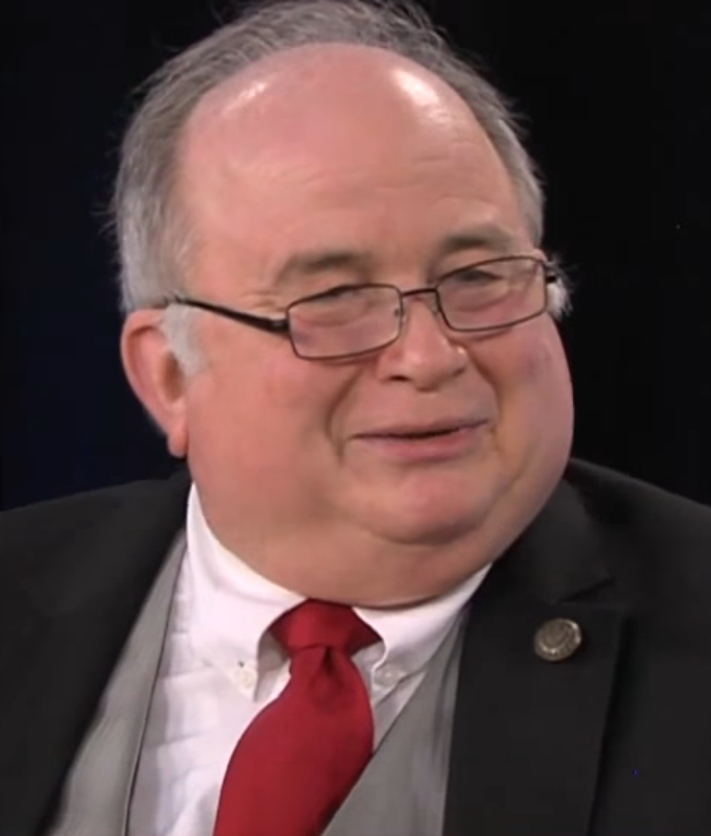
Nominee	Sarah Copeland Hanzas	H. Brooke Paige
Party	Democratic	Republican
Popular vote	205,378	138,673
Percentage	59.61%	40.25%
- Hanzas: 50–60% 60–70% 70–80% 80–90% Paige: 50–60% 60–70% 70–80% No votes
Secretary of State before election
Sarah Copeland Hanzas
Democratic
Elected Secretary of State
Sarah Copeland Hanzas
Democratic

The 2024 Vermont Secretary of State election was held on November 5, 2024, to elect the secretary of state of the state of Vermont. It coincided with the concurrent presidential election, as well as various state and local elections, including for U.S. Senate, U.S. House, and governor of Vermont. Incumbent secretary of state Sarah Copeland Hanzas was re-elected to a second two-year term, defeating Republican newsstand owner H. Brooke Paige.

Primary elections took place on August 13, 2024.

== Democratic primary ==
=== Candidates ===
==== Nominee ====
- Sarah Copeland Hanzas, incumbent secretary of state

=== Results ===
Democratic primary results
Party	Candidate	Votes	%
Democratic	Sarah Copeland Hanzas (incumbent)	43,182	99.32%
Write-in		294	0.68%
Total votes		43,476	100.00%

== Republican primary ==
=== Candidates ===
==== Nominee ====
- H. Brooke Paige, newsstand owner and perennial candidate

=== Results ===
Republican primary results
Party	Candidate	Votes	%
Republican	H. Brooke Paige	18,989	98.10%
Write-in		368	1.90%
Total votes		19,357	100.00%

== General election ==
=== Predictions ===
Source	Ranking	As of
Sabato's Crystal Ball	Safe D	July 25, 2024

=== Results ===
2024 Vermont Secretary of State Election
Party	Candidate	Votes	%
Democratic	Sarah Copeland Hanzas (incumbent)	205,378	59.61%
Republican	H. Brooke Paige	138,673	40.25%
Write-in		473	0.14%
Total votes		344,524	100.00%

==== By county ====
County	Sarah Copeland Hanzas Democratic		H. Brooke Paige Republican		Various candidates Other parties	
County	#	%	#	%	#	%
Addison	12,880	60.24%	8,474	39.63%	27	0.13%
Bennington	10,959	56.91%	8,273	42.96%	24	0.12%
Caledonia	7,866	50.05%	7,828	49.81%	22	0.14%
Chittenden	63,139	70.71%	26,024	29.14%	131	0.15%
Essex	1,218	37.96%	1,989	61.98%	2	0.06%
Franklin	11,214	44.3%	14,060	55.54%	40	0.16%
Grand Isle	2,467	52.31%	2,242	47.54%	7	0.15%
Lamoille	8,016	58.17%	5,755	41.76%	10	0.07%
Orange	9,510	56.42%	7,314	43.39%	32	0.19%
Orleans	6,053	43.56%	7,833	56.37%	9	0.06%
Rutland	14,656	45.61%	17,443	54.28%	36	0.11%
Washington	21,290	64.29%	11,749	35.48%	77	0.23%
Windham	16,333	68.79%	7,381	31.08%	31	0.13%
Windsor	19,777	61.59%	12,308	38.33%	25	0.08%
Totals	205,378	59.61%	138,673	40.25%	473	0.14%

Counties that flipped from Democratic to Republican

- Franklin (largest city: St. Albans)
- Rutland (largest city: Rutland)
- Orleans (largest city: Derby)
