= 2022 Vermont Secretary of State election =

- November 8, 2022
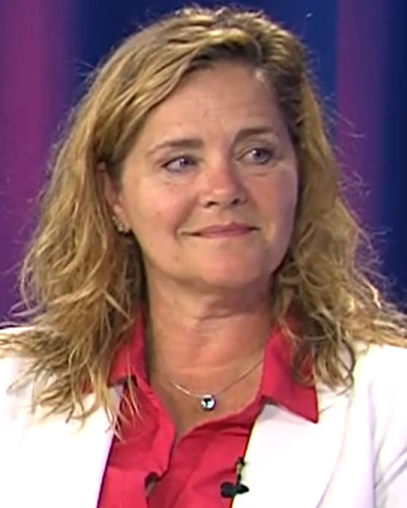

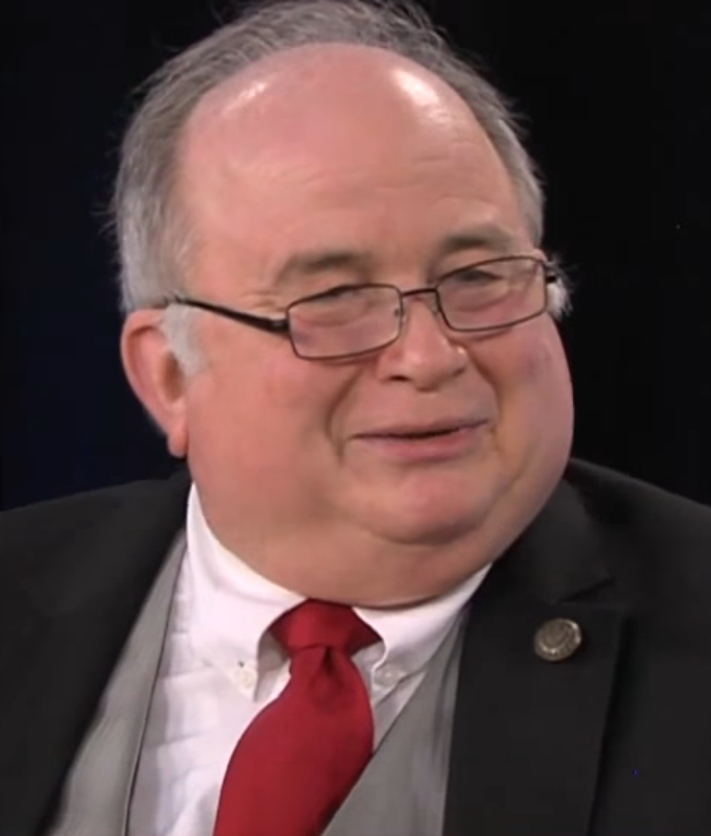
Nominee	Sarah Copeland Hanzas	H. Brooke Paige
Party	Democratic	Republican
Popular vote	179,087	95,666
Percentage	65.03%	34.74%
- Copeland-Hanzas: 50–60% 60–70% 70–80% 80–90% 90–100% Paige: 50–60% 60–70%
Secretary of State before election
Jim Condos
Democratic
Elected Secretary of State
Sarah Copeland-Hanzas
Democratic

The 2022 Vermont Secretary of State election was held on November 8, 2022, to elect the Secretary of State of Vermont. Incumbent Democratic secretary Jim Condos declined to seek re-election to a seventh term in office.

Primary elections were held on August 9, 2022. Democratic state representative Sarah Copeland Hanzas narrowly won the Democratic primary against Deputy Secretary of State Chris Winters, and H. Brooke Paige won the Republican primary only facing token write-in opposition. Hanzas comfortably won the general election.

== Democratic primary ==
=== Candidates ===
==== Nominee ====
- Sarah Copeland Hanzas, state representative from Orange-2 since 2005

==== Eliminated in primary ====
- John Odum, Montpelier city clerk
- Chris Winters, deputy secretary of state and former Berlin school board member

=== Endorsements ===
Sarah Copeland Hanzas

State legislators

- Kate Webb, state representative from Chittenden-5 (2009-2023)
Chris Winters

Statewide officials

- Jim Condos, incumbent Vermont Secretary of State (2011-present)
- Deb Markowitz, former Vermont Secretary of State (1999-2011)

=== Results ===
Democratic primary results
Party	Candidate	Votes	%
Democratic	Sarah Copeland Hanzas	35,968	35.12%
Democratic	Chris Winters	34,138	33.34%
Democratic	John Odum	13,707	13.39%
Write-in		414	0.40%
Rejected ballots		18,181	17.75%
Total votes		102,408	100.0%

== Republican primary ==
=== Candidates ===
==== Nominee ====
- H. Brooke Paige, perennial candidate, nominee for Secretary of State and Attorney General in 2020 and nominee for Secretary of State in 2018

==== Declined ====
- Dustin Degree, deputy commissioner of the Vermont Department of Labor, former state senator and former state representative

=== Results ===
Republican primary results
Party	Candidate	Votes	%
Republican	H. Brooke Paige	21,591	70.65%
Write-in		752	2.46%
Rejected ballots		8,217	26.89%
Total votes		30,560	100.0%

== Progressive primary ==
=== Candidates ===
==== Withdrew after winning primary ====
- Robert Millar, Winooski city councilman

=== Results ===
Progressive primary results
Party	Candidate	Votes	%
Progressive	Robert Millar	480	78.69%
Write-in		44	7.21%
Rejected ballots		86	14.10%
Total votes		610	100.0%

== General election ==
=== Predictions ===
Source	Ranking	As of
Sabato's Crystal Ball	Safe D	August 11, 2022
Elections Daily	Safe D	November 7, 2022

=== Results ===
2022 Vermont Secretary of State election
Party	Candidate	Votes	%	±%
Democratic	Sarah Copeland Hanzas	179,087	65.03%	+3.15%
Republican	H. Brooke Paige	95,666	34.74%	+6.04%
Write-in		626	0.23%	
Rejected ballots		16,576	5.68%	
Total votes		275,379 (Note: Does not include spoiled or blank ballots, which were not included in the final percentages according to the Secretary of State. Including them, the total number is 291,955.)	100.00%	
Democratic hold				

==== By county ====
County	Sarah Copeland Hanzas Democratic		H. Brooke Paige Republican		Various candidates Other parties	
County	#	%	#	%	#	%
Addison	11,618	66.78%	5,778	33.21%	1	0.01%
Bennington	9,275	61.12%	5,900	38.88%	1	0.01%
Caledonia	6,890	55.93%	5,428	44.06%	1	0.01%
Chittenden	53,156	74.45%	18,241	25.55%	0	0.0%
Essex	990	42.56%	1,336	57.44%	0	0.0%
Franklin	9,714	51.37%	9,196	48.63%	0	0.0%
Grand Isle	2,213	57.81%	1,614	42.16%	1	0.03%
Lamoille	7,071	64.75%	3,849	35.25%	0	0.0%
Orange	8,050	61.89%	4,947	38.03%	10	0.08%
Orleans	5,234	50.45%	5,139	49.53%	2	0.02%
Rutland	13,098	51.91%	12,133	48.09%	0	0.0%
Washington	18,864	70.32%	7,955	29.65%	7	0.03%
Windham	13,908	72.01%	5,406	27.99%	1	0.01%
Windsor	17,480	67.39%	8,459	32.61%	0	0.0%
Totals	177,561	65.05%	95,381	34.94%	24	0.01%

== See also ==
- 2022 Vermont elections
- Secretary of State of Vermont
