= Bryce Bennett (politician) =

American politician from Montana

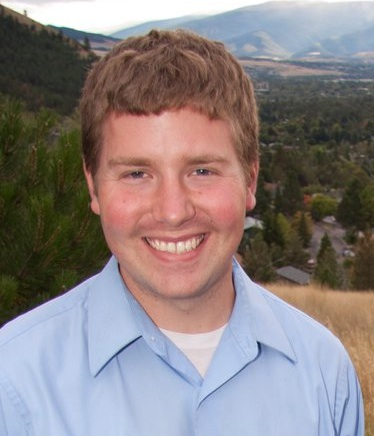

Member of the Montana Senate from the 50th district
- In office January 7, 2019 – August 2, 2021
- Preceded by: Tom Facey
- Succeeded by: Tom Steenberg

Member of the Montana House of Representatives
- In office January 5, 2015 – January 7, 2019
- Preceded by: David Moore
- Succeeded by: Connie Keogh
- Constituency: 91st District
- In office January 3, 2011 – January 5, 2015
- Preceded by: Robin Hamilton
- Succeeded by: David Moore
- Constituency: 92nd District

Personal details
- Born: November 11, 1984 (age 41) Billings, Montana, U.S.
- Party: Democratic
- Education: University of Montana (BA)
- Website: Campaign website

Bryce Bennett (born November 11, 1984) is an American politician from Montana. As a Democrat, he served in the Montana Senate from 2019 to 2021, and represented the 50th senate district based in Missoula. He previously served in the Montana House of Representatives from 2011 to 2019.

== Early life and education ==
Born in Billings, Montana, Bennett is a fifth-generation Montanan. When he was young, his family moved to Hysham, Montana. When he was eight, they moved to the Missoula Valley. He attended Lolo Elementary and Big Sky High School, before enrolling at the University of Montana.

== Political career ==
After graduating in 2007, Bennett went to work for the Democratic National Committee in western Montana. Following the 2008 election, he moved to Helena, Montana, and worked for the Montana House Democrats.

When Rep. Robin Hamilton announced that he would not be seeking re-election in 2010, Bennett declared his candidacy for the seat. In the 2010 Democratic primary election, Bennett won 85% of the vote, defeating his opponent by more than five-to-one. In the general election held on November 2, Bennett won narrowly: he took 50.4% of the vote, while the Republican nominee won 46.9% and the Libertarian 2.7%. He took office in January 2011.

Bryce founded the Montana Privacy Caucus by bringing together Republicans and Democrats in the legislature to combat the overreach of government and corporations into people's personal lives. Together, the caucus passed a series of bills which protect Montanans' private data.

Bennett served as a Minority Caucus Chair in the 2013–2014 session, and as Minority Whip of the House during the 2015–2016 session.

The Montana Ambassadors named Bennett Legislator of the Year for his work to combat dark money.

=== 2020 Secretary of State election ===
In the 2020 Montana elections, Bennett ran for Secretary of State of Montana. He was uncontested in the Democratic Primary. Christi Jacobsen defeated Bennett, 59.56% to 40.44%.

== Personal life ==
Bennett is openly gay. He is the first openly gay man to serve in the Montana legislature. His 2010 campaign won the support of the Gay & Lesbian Victory Fund.

The Advocate named Bennett one of their "40 under 40". He was also named to "Out magazine's "Power List", which included "exemplary individuals [who] manage to influence the way others live — either through their public personas, politics, or wealth — and affect cultural and social attitudes."
