= Sarah Copeland Hanzas =

American politician (born 1970)

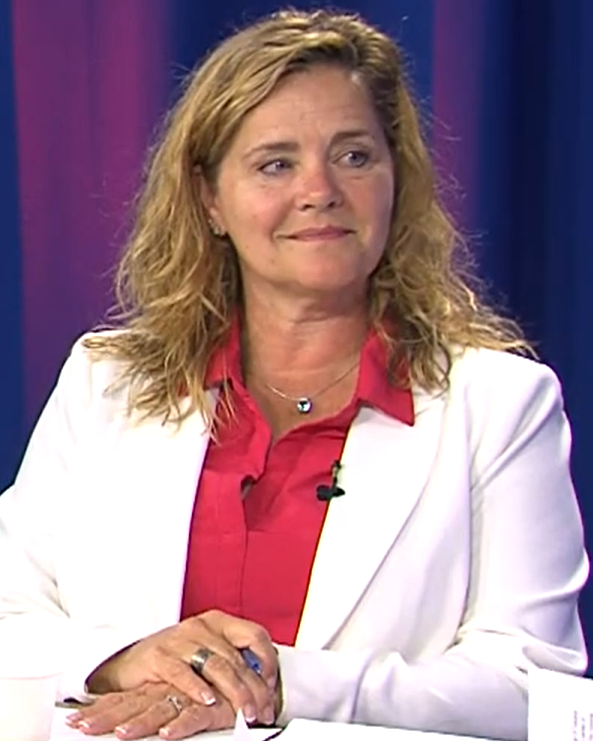
- Copeland Hanzas in 2024

40th Secretary of State of Vermont
- Incumbent
- Assumed office January 5, 2023
- Governor: Phil Scott
- Preceded by: Jim Condos

Majority Leader of the Vermont House of Representatives
- In office January 2015 – January 4, 2017
- Preceded by: Willem Jewett
- Succeeded by: Jill Krowinski

Member of the Vermont House of Representatives from the Orange 2nd district
- In office January 7, 2005 – January 5, 2023
- Preceded by: Wayne G. Kenyon
- Succeeded by: Monique Priestley

Personal details
- Born: Sarah Louise Copeland; July 9, 1970 (age 56) Lake Forest, Illinois, U.S.
- Party: Democratic
- Spouse: John P. Hanzas Jr.
- Children: 3
- Education: University of Vermont (BA, BS)

Sarah Louise Copeland Hanzas (born July 9, 1970) is an American Democratic Party politician who is serving as the Secretary of State of Vermont. She previously served in the Vermont House of Representatives from Orange County's 2nd district, having been first elected in 2004.

Copeland Hanzas was elected as the Secretary of State in 2022 and 2024, defeating Republican nominee and perennial candidate H. Brooke Paige both times.

== Early life and career ==
Sarah Louise Copeland Hanzas was born in Lake Forest, Illinois on July 9, 1970 and her family moved to Vermont in 1971. She grew up in Corinth and graduated from Bradford's Oxbow High School in 1988. She then attended the University of Vermont from which she received a Bachelor of Arts in history in 1992 and a Bachelor of Arts in geology in 1993. In 1995, she completed her teaching certification at Upper Valley Educators Institute in Lebanon, New Hampshire.

After becoming qualified as a teacher, Copeland Hanzas instructed secondary science in several Upper Connecticut River Valley public schools and at Valley Vista residential treatment center in Bradford. Beginning in 2010, she owned a small business in Bradford, the Local Buzz Cafe, which she operated until she closed it in 2021.

== Political career ==
In 2004, Copeland Hanzas was elected to the Vermont House of Representatives. She was reelected every two years through 2020, and served from January 2005 to January 2023. During her House service, Copeland Hanzas was a member of the Health Care Committee and chair of the Government Operations Committee. From 2015 to 2017, she was the majority leader. While in the house, she also served on the Executive Committee of the National Conference of State Legislatures.

In 2022, Copeland Hanzas was a candidate for the Democratic nomination for secretary of state. In the August primary, she defeated deputy secretary of state Chris Winters and Montpelier city clerk John Odum; Copeland Hanzas received 43 percent of the vote to 41 for Winters and 16 for Odum. In the November general election, she defeated perennial Republican candidate H. Brooke Paige by a vote of 61 to 33 percent. She was sworn in for the beginning of her term in January 2023.

== Personal life ==
Copeland is married to John P. Hanzas Jr. They reside in Bradford, Vermont and are the parents of three children. She is Methodist.

Vermont House of Representatives
Preceded by Jill Krowinski	Majority Leader of the Vermont House of Representatives; 2015–2017	Succeeded by Willem Jewett
Political offices
Preceded by Jim Condos	Secretary of State of Vermont; 2023–present	Incumbent
Party political offices
Preceded by Jim Condos	Democratic nominee for Vermont Secretary of State; 2022, 2024, 2026	Most recent
