= Christi Jacobsen =

American politician

22nd Secretary of State of Montana
- Incumbent
- Assumed office January 4, 2021
- Governor: Greg Gianforte
- Preceded by: Corey Stapleton

Personal details
- Born: 1975 or 1976 (age 50–51) Helena, Montana, U.S.
- Party: Republican
- Spouse: Eric
- Children: 5
- Education: Carroll College (BA); University of Montana (MPA)

Christi Jacobsen (born 1975/1976) is an American politician from the state of Montana. A Republican, she is the Secretary of State of Montana, serving since 2021.

== Early life and career ==
Jacobsen was born in Helena, Montana, and earned her bachelor's degree from Carroll College in 1997 and a Master of Public Administration from the University of Montana in 2000.

Jacobsen served as an administrator for the Montana State Auditor's office and the Montana Department of Justice. In 2016, incoming Secretary of State of Montana Corey Stapleton announced that Jacobsen would serve as his chief of staff.

== Montana Secretary of State ==
With Stapleton not running for reelection as Secretary of State of Montana in the 2020 elections, Jacobsen announced her candidacy. In the Republican Party primary election, she defeated fellow Republicans Forrest Mandeville, Scott Sales, and Brad Johnson. She defeated Bryce Bennett, the Democratic Party nominee, in the general election.

Jacobsen was sworn into office on January 4, 2021. Shortly thereafter, she expressed her support for Republican legislation to end same-day voter registration in Montana for all except military and overseas voters. In April 2021, Governor Greg Gianforte signed into law these restrictions; among the new restrictions was the end of same-day voter registration in Montana, as well prevention of university students from using a student ID as a voter ID to vote. The new restrictions also limited ballot collection, which complicated voting in communities where election infrastructure was limited, such as the Native American community in Montana, a Democratic-leaning constituency.

Jacobsen announced she was seeking reelection as Secretary of State in November 2023. Jacobsen was reelected in 2024 with 62 percent of the vote, defeating Democratic nominee Jesse Mullen with 35 percent, and Libertarian nominee John Lamb with 3 percent of the vote.

== U.S. House campaign ==
After Ryan Zinke, the incumbent U.S. Representative for Montana's 1st congressional district announced that he would not run for reelection in the 2026 elections, Jacobsen announced her campaign for the Republican nomination. She lost the nomination to Aaron Flint.

== Personal life ==
Jacobsen and her husband, Eric, have five children.

Political offices
Preceded by Corey Stapleton	Secretary of State of Montana; 2021–present	Incumbent
