= Secretary of State of Montana =

Elected constitutional office in Montana, United States

- Incumbent; Christi Jacobsen since January 4, 2021
- Type: Secretary of State
- Formation: 1889
- First holder: Louis Rotwitt
- Website: Official homepage of the Montana Secretary of State

The secretary of state of Montana is one of the elected constitutional officers of executive branch of the U.S. state of Montana.

The current secretary of state is Christi Jacobsen.

== Organization ==
The Secretary of State's Office is composed of five divisions:

- The Administrative Rules Services Division is the administrative law arm of the Secretary's office, filing rule notices, rule adoptions, and interpretations, and publishing the state register twice a month. The state's code of regulations, the Administrative Rules of Montana, is updated quarterly.
- The Business Services Division registers business entities, trademarks, assumed business names, and liens made under the Uniform Commercial Code and Federal Food Security Act.
- The Certification and Notaries Division licenses and trains notaries public and certifies documents.
- The Elections and Government Services division administers elections and voter registration. Campaign finance and lobbying is regulated by a separate agency, the Commissioner of Political Practices.
- The Records Management Bureau maintains the records of state and local governments.

== Other duties ==
The Secretary is the keeper of the Montana state seal, and also serves on the Montana Board of Land Commissioners, which administers school trust lands.

The Montana Secretary of State Records Center, located in Helena, shares the duty of archiving official state e-mails with an archivist who reports to the Governor.

== List of secretaries of state of Montana ==
To be eligible to be a Secretary of State of Montana, a candidate must be 25 years old or older, a United States citizen, and a Montana resident for at least two years before election.

#	Image	Name	Term of office	Party
1		Louis Rotwitt	1889—1897	Republican
2		Thomas S. Hogan	1897—1901	Populist
3		George M. Hayes	1901—1905	Democratic
4		Abraham N. Yoder	1905—1911	Republican
5		Thomas M. Swindlehurst	1911—1913	Democratic
6		Adelbert M. Alderson	1913—1916	Democratic
7		Charles T. Stewart	1917—1927	Republican
8		Robert N. Hawkins	1927	Democratic
9		William Powers	1927—1928	
10		John W. Mountjoy	1928—1929	Democratic
11		Wilfred E. Harmon	1929—1933	Republican
12		Sam W. Mitchell	1933—1955	Democratic
13		S. C. Arnold	1955—1957	Republican
14		Frank Murray	1957—1981	Democratic
15		Jim Waltermire	1981—1988	Republican
16		Verner Bertelsen	1988—1989	Republican
17		Mike Cooney	1989—2001	Democratic
18		Bob Brown	2001—2005	Republican
19		Brad Johnson	2005—2009	Republican
20		Linda McCulloch	2009—2017	Democratic
21		Corey Stapleton	2017—2021	Republican
22		Christi Jacobsen	2021—present	Republican

== See also ==
- List of governors of Montana
- List of lieutenant governors of Montana
- Montana Department of Justice
- List of company registers
