= 2026 United States House of Representatives elections in Missouri =

- November 3, 2026

All 8 Missouri seats to the United States House of Representatives
	Majority party	Minority party
Party	Republican	Democratic
Last election	6	2
Seats won	5	3
Seat change	▼1	▲1
Popular vote	1,022,982	1,008,238
Percentage	48.91%	48.21%
Swing	▼9.59%	▲9.72%

Republican hold
Democratic hold Democratic gain
Republican
40–50%
50–60%
60–70%
70–80%
80–90%
Democratic
50–60%
60–70%
80–90%

The 2026 United States House of Representatives elections in Missouri were held on November 3, 2026, to elect the eight U.S. representatives from the state of Missouri, one from each of the state's eight congressional districts. The elections coincided with other elections to the House of Representatives, elections to the United States Senate, and various state and local elections. Primary elections took place on August 4, 2026. Democrats won the second district for the first time since 1990.

== Overview ==
Map of Missouri's congressional districts used in the 2022 and 2024 congressional elections Interactive map version

Map of Missouri's congressional districts subject to the veto referendum Interactive map version

Proposition A appeared on the November 3, 2026, ballot in the state of Missouri as a veto referendum. Voters decided that congressional districts that the Missouri General Assembly adopted in 2025 will not take effect.

In September 2025, Missouri lawmakers passed—and Missouri governor Mike Kehoe signed into law—an act changing the state's congressional districts. The new districts dismantled the strongly Democratic-leaning 5th congressional district.

However, before the map took effect, it faced a lawsuit and a veto referendum. The lawsuit argued the new map was unconstitutional, and violated the part of Missouri's Constitution stating that redistricting had to occur after a United States census. But the Missouri Supreme Court disagreed, ruling 4–3 that the state constitution requires redistricting to happen after a census, but does not otherwise explicitly prohibit it.

The veto referendum, in which voters decide whether to pass or reject a law, was initiated by a group named People Not Politicians Missouri after they gathered over 300,000 signatures. Although the number of signatures submitted was sufficient, Missouri Secretary of State Denny Hoskins refused to place the measure on the ballot, stating that it was an unconstitutional measure. The Missouri Supreme Court ruled against him, ordering the veto referendum on the ballot and the use of the 2022 congressional maps during the concurrent congressional elections.

=== Statewide ===
Party	Candi- dates	Votes		Seats		
Party	Candi- dates	No.	%	No.	+/–	%
Republican Party	8	1,022,982	48.91%	5	▼1	62.5%
Democratic Party	8	1,008,238	48.21%	3	▲1	37.5%
Libertarian Party	8	59,636	2.85%	0	Steady	0%
Write-ins	4	594	0.03%	0	Steady	0%
Total	28	2,091,450	100%	8	Steady	100%

Popular vote
Republican	48.91%
Democratic	48.21%
Libertarian	2.85%
Other	0.03%

House seats
Republican	62.50%
Democratic	37.50%

== District 1 ==
2026 Missouri's 1st congressional district election
- November 3, 2026
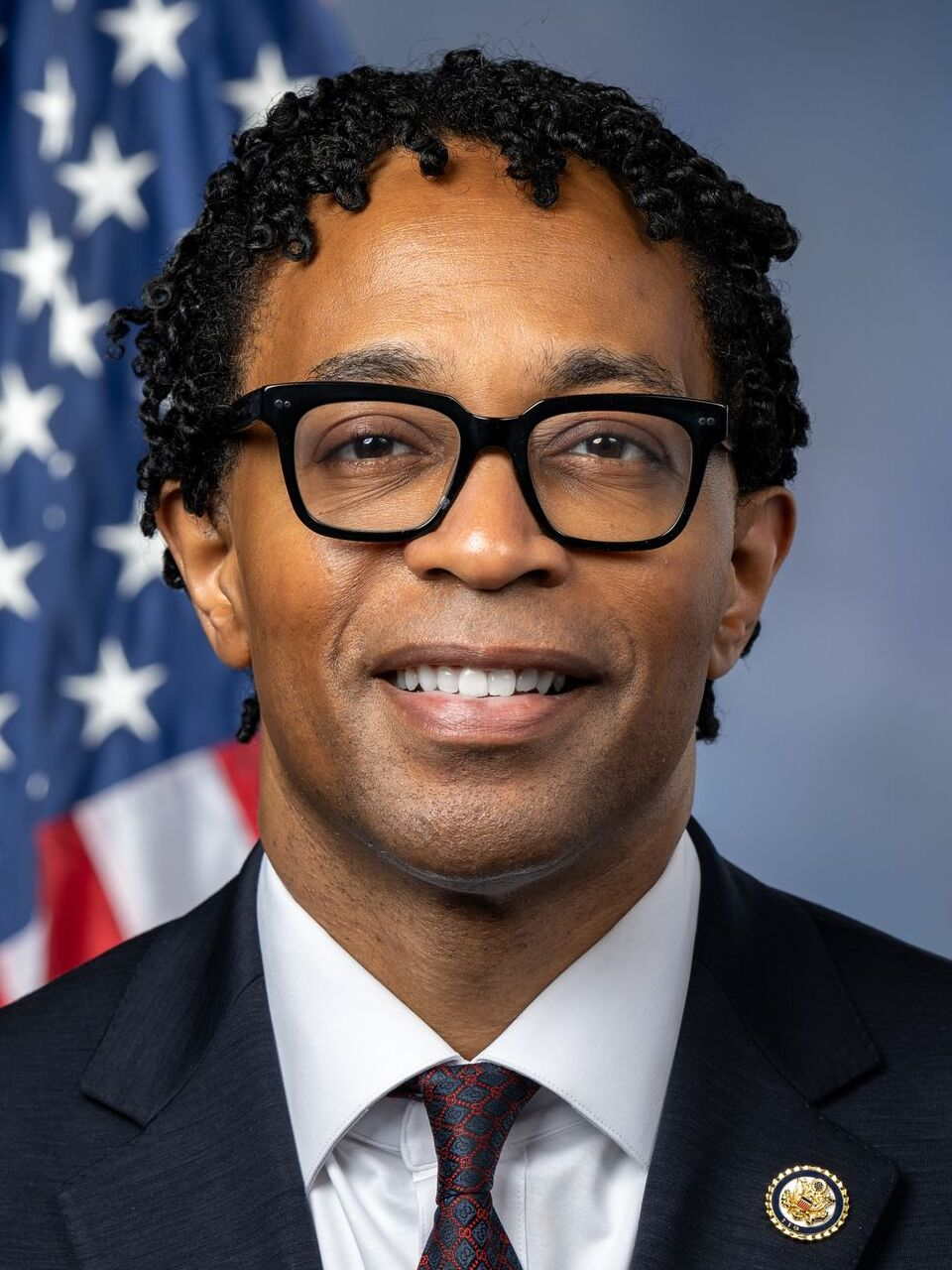

Nominee	Wesley Bell	Paul Berry
Party	Democratic	Republican
Popular vote	189,175	32,362
Percentage	81.51%	13.92%
- County results Bell: 80–90%
U.S. Representative before election
Wesley Bell
Democratic
Elected U.S. Representative
Wesley Bell
Democratic

Missouri's 1st congressional district boundary used in the primaries of the 2026 elections Interactive map version

Missouri's 1st congressional district boundary used in the general elections for the 2026 elections Interactive map version

The 1st district encompasses the city of St. Louis and much of northern St. Louis County, including Florissant and University City. The incumbent is Democrat Wesley Bell, who was elected with 75.9% of the vote in 2024.

=== Democratic primary ===
==== Candidates ====
===== Nominee =====
- Wesley Bell, incumbent U.S. representative

===== Eliminated in primary =====
- Cori Bush, former U.S. representative (2021–2025)
- Carl Harris, business owner
- Carl E. Henderson
- Alissa Murphy, sales director

==== Endorsements ====
Wesley Bell

U.S. representatives

- Pete Aguilar, CA-33 (2015–present)
- Katherine Clark, House minority whip (2023–present) from MA-05 (2013–present)
- Emanuel Cleaver, MO-05 (2005–present)
- Hakeem Jeffries, House minority leader (2023–present) from NY-08 (2013–present)
- Nancy Pelosi, former speaker of the House (2007–2011, 2019–2023) from CA-11 (1987–present)

Labor unions

- American Federation of Government Employees
- Missouri AFL-CIO
- Missouri and Kansas Laborers District Council
- National Education Association
- United Auto Workers

Organizations

- AIPAC
- Congressional Black Caucus
- Democratic Majority for Israel
- Humane World Action Fund
- Jewish Democratic Council of America
- Joint Action Committee for Political Affairs
- League of Conservation Voters
- Planned Parenthood Action Fund

Newspapers

- St. Louis Post-Dispatch
- The St. Louis American
Cori Bush

U.S. senators

- Bernie Sanders, Vermont (2007–present) (Independent)

U.S. representatives

- Jamaal Bowman, former NY-16 (2021–2025)
- Ayanna Pressley, MA-07 (2019–present)
- Rashida Tlaib, MI-12 (2019–present)

Local officials

- Rasheen Aldridge Jr., St. Louis alderman from the 14th ward (2023–present)

Individuals

- Jenifer Lewis, actress and singer
- Ms. Rachel, YouTuber and children's educator
- Hasan Piker, political commentator

Labor unions

- National Nurses United
- UNITE HERE Local 74

Organizations

- A New Policy PAC
- Center for Biological Diversity
- CAIR Action
- Democratic Socialists of America
- Friends of the Earth
- Jewish Voice for Peace
- Justice Democrats
- MoveOn
- Our Revolution
- PAL PAC
- Peace Action
- Progressive Democrats of America
- Progressive Victory
- St. Louis Democratic Socialists of America
- Track AIPAC
- US Campaign for Palestinian Rights Action

==== Fundraising ====
Campaign finance reports as of July 15, 2026
Candidate	Raised	Spent	Cash on hand
Wesley Bell (D)	$3,561,711	$2,901,538	$1,094,094
Cori Bush (D)	$1,306,727	$1,206,974	$97,762
Source: Federal Election Commission

==== Polling ====
Poll source	Date(s) administered	Sample size (Note: Key: A – all adults RV – registered voters LV – likely voters V – unclear)	Margin of error	Wesley Bell	Cori Bush	Undecided
HIT Strategies (D) (Note: Poll sponsored by Bush's campaign)	February 19–23, 2026	401 (LV)	± 5.4%	44%	40%	17%

==== Forums ====
2026 Missouri's 1st congressional district Democratic primary forums
No.	Date	Host	Moderator	Link	Democratic	Democratic	Democratic	Democratic	Democratic
Key: P Participant A Absent N Not invited I Invited W Withdrawn									
Key: P Participant A Absent N Not invited I Invited W Withdrawn					Wesley Bell	Cori Bush	Carl Harris	Carl E. Henderson	Alissa Murphy
1	Apr. 30, 2026	Democratic Wards; 3, 5, 6, 7, and 8	Ben Murray; Inez Bordeaux	YouTube	A (Note: Bell was unable to attend because of a scheduling conflict. A campaign surrogate read an opening statement on his behalf by phone.)	P	N	N	N
2	Jul. 24, 2026	STLPR	Jason Rosenbaum	YouTube	P	P	N	N	N

==== Results ====
Democratic primary results by county: Bell: 60–70%; 40–50%

Democratic primary results
Party	Candidate	Votes	%
Democratic	Wesley Bell (incumbent)	83,853	59.2
Democratic	Cori Bush	52,299	36.9
Democratic	Alissa Murphy	3,261	2.3
Democratic	Carl Harris	1,570	1.1
Democratic	Carl E. Henderson	728	0.5
Total votes		141,711	100.0

===== Results by county =====
County (Note: The boundaries of the superseded 2026 congressional map were used in the tabulation of these results.)	Wesley Bell		Cori Bush		Various candidates (Note: Combined totals of multiple different candidates.)		Margin		Total
County	#	%	#	%	#	%	#	%	Total
St. Louis City	27,720	49.82%	25,746	46.28%	2,170	3.90%	1,974	3.54%	55,636
St. Louis County (part)	56,133	65.21%	26,553	30.85%	3,389	3.94%	29,580	34.36%	86,075
Total	83,853	59.17%	52,299	36.91%	5,559	3.92%	31,554	22.26%	141,711

=== Republican primary ===
==== Candidates ====
===== Nominee =====
- Paul Berry, bail bondsman and perennial candidate

===== Eliminated in primary =====
- Andrew Jones, utility executive and perennial candidate

==== Results ====
Republican primary results
Party	Candidate	Votes	%
Republican	Paul Berry	7,042	53.4
Republican	Andrew Jones	6,136	46.6
Total votes		13,178	100.0

===== Results by county =====
County (Note: The boundaries of the superseded 2026 congressional map were used in the tabulation of these results.)	Paul Berry		Andrew Jones		Margin		Total
County	#	%	#	%	#	%	Total
St. Louis City	1,362	48.01%	1,475	51.99%	-113	-3.98%	2,837
St. Louis County (part)	5,680	54.93%	4,661	45.07%	1,019	9.86%	10,341
Total	7,042	53.44%	6,136	46.56%	906	6.88%	13,178

=== Libertarian primary ===
==== Nominee ====
- Tom Schmitz, vice chair of the Libertarian Party of Missouri for Ward 4

==== Results ====
Libertarian primary results
Party	Candidate	Votes	%
Libertarian	Tom Schmitz	428	100.0
Total votes		428	100.0

=== General election ===
==== Predictions ====
Source	Ranking	As of
Decision Desk HQ	Safe D	July 14, 2026
The Cook Political Report	Solid D	February 6, 2025
Inside Elections	Solid D	March 7, 2025
Sabato's Crystal Ball	Safe D	July 15, 2025

==== Results ====
2026 Missouri's 1st congressional district election
Party	Candidate	Votes	%
Democratic	Wesley Bell (incumbent)	189,175	81.51%
Republican	Paul Berry III	32,308	13.92%
Libertarian	Tom Schmitz	10,613	4.57%
Total votes		232,096	100.00%
Democratic hold			

== District 2 ==
2026 Missouri's 2nd congressional district election

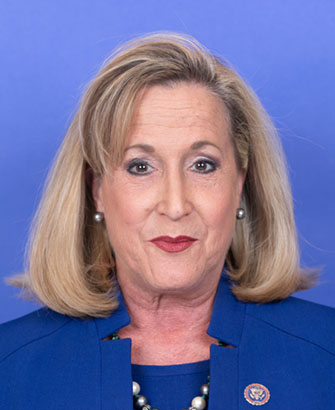
Nominee	Fred Wellman	Ann Wagner
Party	Democratic	Republican
Popular vote	169,477	153,132
Percentage	51.14%	46.21%
- County results Wellman: 50–60% Wagner: 50–60% 60–70%
U.S. Representative before election
Ann Wagner
Republican
Elected U.S. Representative
Fred Wellman
Democratic

Missouri's 2nd congressional district boundary used in the primaries of the 2026 elections Interactive map version

Missouri's 2nd congressional district boundary used in the general elections for the 2026 elections Interactive map version

The 2nd district is anchored by the southern and western suburbs of St. Louis County, including Wildwood, Chesterfield, Ballwin and Kirkwood, as well as Franklin County and others. The incumbent is Republican Ann Wagner, who was re-elected with 54.5% of the vote in 2024.

=== Republican primary ===
==== Nominee ====
- Ann Wagner, incumbent U.S. representative

==== Eliminated in primary ====
- Matthew Grant, lawyer
- Peter Pfeifer, entrepreneur
- Elizabeth Sparks-Holmes
- Brandon Wilkinson, truck driver

Not on ballot

- Ryan Sheridan, nurse

==== Withdrawn ====
- Bill Eigel, former state senator from the 23rd district (2017–2025) and candidate for governor in 2024 (running for St. Charles County Executive)

==== Endorsements ====
Ann Wagner

Executive branch officials

- Donald Trump, president of the United States (2017–2021, 2025–present)

Organizations

- AIPAC
- Missouri Fraternal Order of Police
- Log Cabin Republicans
- Maggie's List

==== Fundraising ====
Campaign finance reports as of July 15, 2026
Candidate	Raised	Spent	Cash on hand
Ryan Sheridan (R)	$120,290	$120,290	$0
Ann Wagner (R)	$3,528,094	$2,411,927	$4,227,396
Source: Federal Election Commission

==== Results ====
Republican primary results
Party	Candidate	Votes	%
Republican	Ann Wagner (incumbent)	63,668	73.8
Republican	Peter Pfeifer	6,854	8.0
Republican	Brandon Wilkinson	6,052	7.0
Republican	Matthew Grant	5,550	6.4
Republican	Elizabeth Sparks-Holmes	4,095	4.8
Total votes		86,219	100.0

===== Results by county =====
County (Note: The boundaries of the superseded 2026 congressional map were used in the tabulation of these results.)	Ann Wagner		Various candidates (Note: Combined totals of multiple different candidates.)		Margin		Total
County	#	%	#	%	#	%	Total
Crawford	1,721	62.93%	1,014	37.07%	707	25.86%	2,735
Franklin	10,632	65.54%	5,591	34.46%	5,041	31.08%	16,223
Gasconade	1,768	63.05%	1,036	36.95%	732	26.10%	2,804
Jefferson (part)	5,745	64.25%	3,197	35.75%	2,548	28.50%	8,942
St. Louis (part)	42,221	79.46%	10,911	20.54%	31,310	58.92%	53,132
Washington	1,581	66.34%	802	33.66%	779	32.68%	2,383
Total	63,668	73.84%	22,551	26.16%	41,117	47.68%	86,219

=== Democratic primary ===
==== Nominee ====
- Fred Wellman, podcast host

==== Eliminated in primary ====
- Tim Bilash, physician
- Joan VonDras, retired teacher

==== Withdrawn or disqualified ====
- Nick Vivio, epidemiologist at Columbia University

==== Declined ====
- Doug Beck, minority leader of the Missouri Senate
- Adam Wainwright, commentator for MLB on Fox and former St. Louis Cardinals baseball player

==== Endorsements ====
Fred Wellman

U.S. representatives

- Eric Swalwell, former CA-14 (2013–2026)
- Eugene Vindman, VA-07 (2025–present)
- Jared Huffman, CA-02 (2013–present)

Organizations

- VoteVets

Labor unions

- Missouri AFL-CIO

==== Fundraising ====
Campaign finance reports as of March 31, 2026
Candidate	Raised	Spent	Cash on hand
Tim Bilash (D)	$3,562	$3,733	$129
Chuck Summers (D)	$16,948	$10,718	$73
Nick Vivio (D)	$133,080	$111,962	$21,118
Joan VonDras (D)	$321,990	$96,247	$225,742
Fred Wellman (D)	$808,789	$562,187	$246,602
Source: Federal Election Commission

==== Results ====
Democratic primary results
Party	Candidate	Votes	%
Democratic	Fred Wellman	39,345	45.9
Democratic	Joan VonDras	36,942	43.0
Democratic	Tim Bilash	9,562	11.1
Total votes		85,849	100.0

===== Results by county =====
County (Note: The boundaries of the superseded 2026 congressional map were used in the tabulation of these results.)	Fred Wellman		Joan VonDras		Tim Bilash		Margin		Total
County	#	%	#	%	#	%	#	%	Total
Crawford	233	32.77%	327	45.99%	151	21.24%	-94	-13.22%	711
Franklin	1,969	32.64%	3,157	52.34%	906	15.02%	-1,188	-19.70%	6,032
Gasconade	202	38.55%	236	45.04%	86	16.41%	-34	-6.49%	524
Jefferson (part)	1,316	31.16%	2,233	52.88%	674	15.96%	-917	-21.72%	4,223
St. Louis (part)	35,423	48.07%	30,667	41.62%	7,593	10.30%	4,756	6.45%	73,683
Washington	202	29.88%	322	47.63%	152	22.49%	-120	-17.75%	676
Total	39,345	45.83%	36,942	43.03%	9,562	11.14%	2,403	2.80%	85,849

=== Libertarian primary ===
==== Nominee ====
- Brandon Coulter Daugherty

==== Results ====
Libertarian primary results
Party	Candidate	Votes	%
Libertarian	Brandon Coulter Daugherty	843	100.0
Total votes		843	100.0

=== General election ===
==== Predictions ====
Source	Ranking	As of
Decision Desk HQ	Lean R	October 26, 2026
The Cook Political Report	Likely R	September 11, 2026
Inside Elections	Solid R	March 7, 2025
Sabato's Crystal Ball	Lean R	November 2, 2026

==== Post-primary endorsements ====
Fred Wellman (D)

Organizations

- Reproductive Freedom for All

==== Fundraising ====
Campaign finance reports as of October 14, 2026
Candidate	Raised	Spent	Cash on hand
Ann Wagner (R)	$4,189,876	$5,669,709	$1,631,397
Fred Wellman (D)	$2,178,965	$1,938,247	$240,718
Source: Federal Election Commission

==== Polling ====
Poll source	Date(s) administered	Sample size	Margin of error	Ann Wagner (R)	Fred Wellman (D)	Undecided
Emerson College (Note: Poll sponsored by Poll Vault, a Substack newsletter authored by Sean Trende)	October 31 – November 1, 2026	415 (LV)	–	49%	50%	1%
Emerson College	October 12–14, 2026	401 (LV)	–	46%	51%	3%
Public Policy Polling (D) (Note: Poll sponsored by House Majority PAC, which is focused on electing Democrats to the U.S. House of Representatives)	October 19–20, 2026	631 (LV)	—	45%	46%	10%
Remington Research Group (R)	September 14–15, 2026	565 (LV)	—	43%	42%	15%
FM3 Research (D)	May 26–31, 2026	600 (LV)	± 4.0%	44%	41%	15%

Hypothetical polling

Ann Wagner vs. generic Democrat

Poll source	Date(s) administered	Sample size	Margin of error	Ann Wagner (R)	Generic Democrat	Undecided
Public Policy Polling (D)	May 21–22, 2025	584 (V)	± 4.0%	46%	47%	7%

Generic Republican vs. generic Democrat

Poll source	Date(s) administered	Sample size	Margin of error	Generic Republican	Generic Democrat	Undecided
Remington Research Group (R)	September 14–15, 2026	565 (LV)	—	46%	47%	7%
FM3 Research (D)	May 26–31, 2026	600 (LV)	± 4.0%	48%	44%	8%

==== Results ====
2026 Missouri's 2nd congressional district election
Party	Candidate	Votes	%
Democratic	Fred Wellman	169,477	51.14%
Republican	Ann Wagner (incumbent)	153,132	46.21%
Libertarian	Brandon Daugherty	8,782	2.65%
Total votes		331,391	100.00%
Democratic gain from Republican			

== District 3 ==
2026 Missouri's 3rd congressional district election
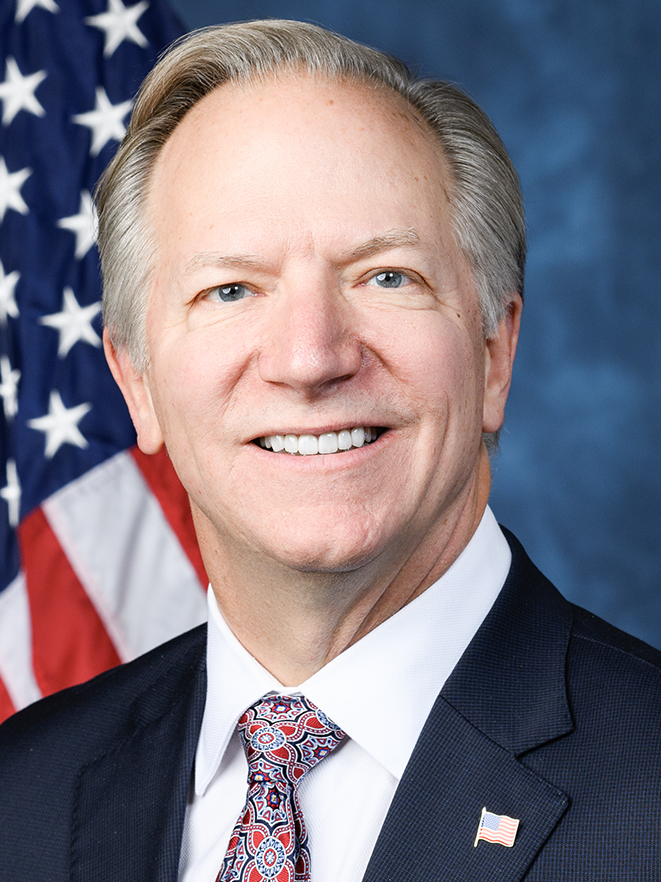

Nominee	Bob Onder	Bethany Mann
Party	Republican	Democratic
Popular vote	155,109	132,279
Percentage	52.51%	44.78%
- Results by county Onder: 50–60% 60–70% 70–80% Mann: 40–50% 60–70%
U.S. Representative before election
Bob Onder
Republican
Elected U.S. Representative
Bob Onder
Republican

Missouri's 3rd congressional district boundary used in the primaries of the 2026 elections Interactive map version

Missouri's 3rd congressional district boundary used in the general elections for the 2026 elections Interactive map version

The third district encompasses most of St. Charles County and extends as far west as to include most of Columbia and as far north as to include Mexico and a section of Hannibal. The incumbent is Republican Bob Onder, who was elected with 61.3% of the vote in 2024.

=== Republican primary ===
==== Nominee ====
- Bob Onder, incumbent U.S. representative

==== Eliminated in primary ====
- John G. Fraser, accountant and former advisor to local government

==== Endorsements ====
Bob Onder

Executive branch officials

- Donald Trump, president of the United States (2017–2021, 2025–present)

Organizations

- AIPAC
- Missouri Right to Life
John G. Fraser

Organizations

- St. Louis Post-Dispatch Editorial Board

==== Fundraising ====
Campaign finance reports as of July 15, 2026
Candidate	Raised	Spent	Cash on hand
John G. Fraser (R)	$17,196	$13,413	$3,783
Bob Onder (R)	$950,350	$629,335	$471,459
Source: Federal Election Commission

==== Results ====
Republican primary results
Party	Candidate	Votes	%
Republican	Bob Onder (incumbent)	66,784	66.3
Republican	John G. Fraser	33,915	33.7
Total votes		100,699	100.0

===== Results by county =====
County (Note: The boundaries of the superseded 2026 congressional map were used in the tabulation of these results.)	Bob Onder		John G. Fraser		Margin		Total
County	#	%	#	%	#	%	Total
Audrain	1,980	55.20%	1,607	44.80%	373	10.40%	3,587
Boone (part)	6,604	68.56%	3,028	31.44%	3,576	37.12%	9,632
Callaway	4,658	65.91%	2,409	34.09%	2,249	31.82%	7,067
Lincoln	5,753	68.58%	2,636	31.42%	3,117	37.16%	8,389
Monroe	606	41.00%	872	59.00%	-266	-18.00%	1,478
Montgomery	2,034	67.71%	970	32.29%	1,064	35.42%	3,004
Pike	1,462	62.83%	865	37.17%	597	25.66%	2,327
Ralls	871	41.28%	1,239	58.72%	-368	-17.44%	2,110
St. Charles	39,056	67.70%	18,634	32.30%	20,422	35.40%	57,690
St. Louis (part)	58	70.73%	24	29.27%	34	41.46%	82
Warren	3,702	69.42%	1,631	30.58%	2,071	38.84%	5,333
Total	66,784	66.32%	33,915	33.68%	32,869	32.64%	100,699

=== Democratic primary ===
==== Nominee ====
- Bethany Mann, technology specialist and nominee for this district in 2022 and 2024

==== Eliminated in primary ====
- Tommy Holstein, videographer

==== Withdrawn ====
- Mike Conner, corrections officer
- Alexander Thurmon
- Paul Wilson, dentist anesthesiologist (remained on ballot)

==== Fundraising ====
Italics indicate a withdrawn candidate.

Campaign finance reports as of July 15, 2026
Candidate	Raised	Spent	Cash on hand
Tommy Holstein (D)	$10,095	$7,625	$2,470
Bethany Mann (D)	$43,339	$44,990	$2,776
Paul Wilson (D)	$4,162	$4,453	$0
Source: Federal Election Commission

==== Results ====
Democratic primary results
Party	Candidate	Votes	%
Democratic	Bethany Mann	39,358	69.1
Democratic	Tommy Holstein	10,067	17.7
Democratic	Paul Wilson (withdrawn)	7,539	13.2
Total votes		56,964	100.0

===== Results by county =====
County (Note: The boundaries of the superseded 2026 congressional map were used in the tabulation of these results.)	Bethany Mann		Tommy Holstein		Paul Wilson		Margin		Total
County	#	%	#	%	#	%	#	%	Total
Audrain	581	65.72%	124	14.03%	179	20.25%	402	45.47%	884
Boone (part)	13,816	78.15%	1,916	10.84%	1,946	11.01%	11,870	67.14%	17,678
Callaway	1,681	71.32%	272	11.54%	404	17.14%	1,277	54.18%	2,357
Lincoln	1,599	62.34%	478	18.64%	488	19.03%	1,111	43.31%	2,565
Monroe	174	55.41%	48	15.29%	92	29.30%	82	26.11%	314
Montgomery	161	61.69%	40	15.33%	60	22.99%	101	38.70%	261
Pike	375	63.45%	74	12.52%	142	24.03%	233	39.42%	591
Ralls	248	60.19%	63	15.29%	101	24.51%	147	35.68%	412
St. Charles	19,384	65.06%	6,585	22.10%	3,825	12.84%	12,799	42.96%	29,794
St. Louis (part)	133	71.89%	29	15.68%	23	12.43%	104	56.21%	185
Warren	1,206	62.71%	438	22.78%	279	14.51%	768	39.93%	1,923
Total	39,358	69.09%	10,067	17.67%	7,539	13.23%	29,291	51.42%	56,964

=== Libertarian primary ===
==== Nominee ====
- Jim Higgins, computer systems analyst and perennial candidate

==== Results ====
Libertarian primary results
Party	Candidate	Votes	%
Libertarian	Jim Higgins	1,049	100.0
Total votes		1,049	100.0

=== General election ===
==== Predictions ====
Source	Ranking	As of
Decision Desk HQ	Safe R	October 1, 2026
The Cook Political Report	Solid R	February 6, 2025
Inside Elections	Solid R	March 7, 2025
Sabato's Crystal Ball	Safe R	July 15, 2025

==== Post-primary endorsements ====
Bethany Mann (D)

Labor unions

- Missouri AFL-CIO

Organizations

- National Women's Political Caucus

==== Results ====
2026 Missouri's 3rd congressional district election
Party	Candidate	Votes	%
Republican	Bob Onder (incumbent)	149,239	52.88%
Democratic	Bethany E. Mann	32,308	44.39%
Libertarian	Jim Higgins	7,700	2.73%
Write-in		29	0.01%
Total votes		282,239	100.00%
Republican hold			

== District 4 ==
2026 Missouri's 4th congressional district election
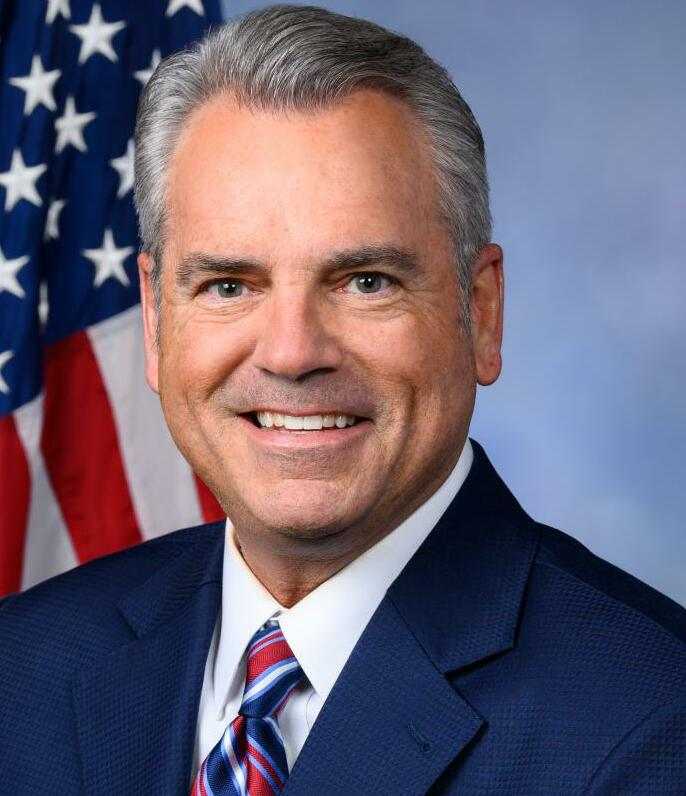

Nominee	Mark Alford	Jordan Herrera
Party	Republican	Democratic
Popular vote	154,236	89,182
Percentage	61.52%	35.57%
- Results by county Alford: 50–60% 60–70% 70–80% 80–90% Herrera: 60–70%
U.S. Representative before election
Mark Alford
Republican
Elected U.S. Representative
Mark Alford
Republican

Missouri's 4th congressional district boundary used in the primaries of the 2026 elections Interactive map version

Missouri's 4th congressional district boundary used in the general elections for the 2026 elections Interactive map version

The 4th District as used in the primary includes a sliver of downtown Kansas City between the Kansas-Missouri border and Troost Avenue, historically the dividing line between the city's white and Black neighborhoods, as well as suburbs such as Lee's Summit and Grandview in southern Jackson County, and rural counties as far south as the Springfield area and as far east as the Lake of the Ozarks.

The 4th district as used in the general election is based in predominantly rural west-central Missouri, taking in Columbia, Sedalia, Warrensburg, and Lebanon.

The incumbent is Republican Mark Alford, who was re-elected with 71.1% of the vote in 2024.

=== Republican primary ===
==== Nominee ====
- Mark Alford, incumbent U.S. representative

==== Eliminated in primary ====
- Heather Shelton
- Scott Vera

==== Endorsements ====
Mark Alford

Executive branch officials

- Donald Trump, president of the United States (2017–2021, 2025–present)

Organizations

- AIPAC
- Missouri Fraternal Order of Police

==== Fundraising ====
Campaign finance reports as of June 30, 2026
Candidate	Raised	Spent	Cash on hand
Mark Alford (R)	$1,370,433	$808,792	$779,509
Source: Federal Election Commission

==== Results ====
Republican primary results
Party	Candidate	Votes	%
Republican	Mark Alford (incumbent)	72,386	77.7
Republican	Heather Shelton	15,935	17.1
Republican	Scott Vera	4,893	5.2
Total votes		93,214	100.0

===== Results by county =====
County (Note: The boundaries of the superseded 2026 congressional map were used in the tabulation of these results.)	Mark Alford		Heather Shelton		Scott Vera		Margin		Total
County	#	%	#	%	#	%	#	%	Total
Barton	1,721	72.22%	535	22.41%	131	5.49%	1,186	49.81%	2,387
Bates	2,521	81.85%	436	14.16%	123	3.99%	2,085	67.69%	3,080
Benton	2,950	77.16%	712	18.62%	161	4.21%	2,238	58.54%	3,823
Camden	5,732	68.65%	2,033	24.35%	585	7.01%	3,699	44.30%	8,350
Cass	11,648	82.60%	1,924	13.64%	530	3.76%	9,724	68.96%	14,102
Cedar	2,145	76.12%	522	18.52%	151	5.36%	1,623	57.60%	2,818
Dade	1,406	75.96%	343	18.53%	102	5.51%	1,063	57.43%	1,851
Dallas	2,097	76.79%	478	17.50%	156	5.71%	1,619	59.29%	2,731
Henry	3,453	78.53%	710	16.15%	234	5.32%	2,743	62.38%	4,397
Hickory	1,397	75.51%	334	18.05%	119	6.43%	1,063	57.46%	1,850
Jackson (part)	18,785	82.78%	2,826	12.45%	1,082	4.77%	15,959	70.33%	22,693
Laclede	4,152	76.31%	1,005	18.47%	284	5.22%	3,147	57.84%	5,441
Polk	4,139	72.31%	1,194	20.86%	391	6.83%	2,945	51.45%	5,724
Pulaski	3,230	71.92%	982	21.87%	279	6.21%	2,248	50.05%	4,491
St. Clair	1,569	74.79%	420	20.02%	109	5.20%	1,149	54.77%	2,098
Vernon	2,496	72.77%	716	20.87%	218	6.36%	1,780	51.90%	3,430
Webster (part)	2,945	74.59%	765	19.38%	238	6.03%	2,180	55.21%	3,948
Total	72,386	77.66%	15,935	17.10%	4,893	5.25%	56,451	60.56%	93,214

=== Democratic primary ===
==== Nominee ====
- Jordan Herrera, attorney

==== Eliminated in primary ====
- Jeanette Cass, farmer and community advocate
- Hartzell Gray, radio host and Kansas City Tenants Union organizer
- Randy Miller, broadcaster
- G Rick, entrepreneur
- Ashleigh Rogers, interior designer
- Wayne Russell

==== Withdrawn ====
- Ricky Dana, web designer
- Danny Province, teacher and entrepreneur

==== Declined ====
- Jolie Justus, former minority leader of the Missouri Senate (2013–2015) from the 10th district (2007–2015) and candidate for mayor of Kansas City in 2019
- Quinton Lucas, mayor of Kansas City (2019–present)

==== Endorsements ====
Jeanette Cass

Organizations

- National Women's Political Caucus
Hartzell Gray

U.S. representatives

- Ro Khanna, CA-17 (2017–present)

State legislators

- Nina Turner, former Ohio state senator (2008–2014)

Organizations

- Progressive Victory
- Progressive Democrats of America
- Track AIPAC
- Kansas City Democratic Socialists of America
Jordan Herrera

Labor unions

- Missouri AFL-CIO

==== Fundraising ====
Italics indicate a withdrawn candidate.

Campaign finance reports as of July 15, 2026
Candidate	Raised	Spent	Cash on hand
Ricky Dana (D)	$578	$578	$0
Hartzell Gray (D)	$250,118	$205,149	$44,969
Jordan Herrera (D)	$39,762	$22,674	$3,125
Danny Province (D)	$25,150	$22,297	$3,991
Source: Federal Election Commission

==== Results ====
Democratic primary results
Party	Candidate	Votes	%
Democratic	Jordan Herrera	19,971	30.5
Democratic	Hartzell Gray	18,192	27.7
Democratic	Jeanette Cass	9,620	14.7
Democratic	Ashleigh Rogers	9,043	13.8
Democratic	Randy Miller	4,889	7.5
Democratic	Wayne Russell	3,228	4.9
Democratic	G Rick	627	0.9
Total votes		65,570	100.0

===== Results by county =====
County (Note: The boundaries of the superseded 2026 congressional map were used in the tabulation of these results.)	Jordan Herrera		Hartzell Gray		Jeanette Cass		Ashleigh Rogers		Randy Miller		Wayne Russell		G Rick		Margin		Total
County	#	%	#	%	#	%	#	%	#	%	#	%	#	%	#	%	Total
Barton	64	30.92%	20	9.66%	41	19.81%	45	21.74%	18	8.70%	12	5.80%	7	3.38%	19	9.18%	207
Bates	222	32.79%	85	12.56%	101	14.92%	110	16.25%	93	13.74%	54	7.98%	12	1.77%	112	16.54%	677
Benton	171	23.78%	76	10.57%	164	22.81%	122	16.97%	112	15.58%	61	8.48%	13	1.81%	7	0.97%	719
Camden	504	27.01%	179	9.59%	414	22.19%	390	20.90%	217	11.63%	144	7.72%	18	0.96%	90	4.82%	1,866
Cass	2,634	33.62%	1,530	19.53%	1,463	18.68%	988	12.61%	736	9.39%	412	5.26%	71	0.91%	1,104	14.09%	7,834
Cedar	74	21.64%	38	11.11%	76	22.22%	72	21.05%	34	9.94%	38	11.11%	10	2.92%	-2	-0.58%	342
Dade	26	13.61%	17	8.90%	39	20.42%	58	30.37%	21	10.99%	29	15.18%	1	0.52%	-19	-9.95%	191
Dallas	107	23.06%	53	11.42%	93	20.04%	79	17.03%	56	12.07%	63	13.58%	13	2.80%	14	3.02%	464
Henry	191	24.68%	98	12.66%	179	23.13%	138	17.83%	94	12.14%	61	7.88%	13	1.68%	12	1.55%	774
Hickory	97	25.53%	25	6.58%	76	20.00%	83	21.84%	45	11.84%	40	10.53%	14	3.68%	14	3.69%	380
Jackson (part)	14,727	31.00%	15,516	32.66%	5,923	12.47%	6,097	12.83%	3,003	6.32%	1,857	3.91%	388	0.82%	-789	-1.66%	47,511
Laclede	232	24.89%	84	9.01%	199	21.35%	180	19.31%	122	13.09%	98	10.52%	17	1.82%	33	3.54%	932
Polk	245	25.98%	108	11.45%	205	21.74%	181	19.19%	90	9.54%	100	10.60%	14	1.48%	40	4.24%	943
Pulaski	341	29.99%	149	13.10%	212	18.65%	212	18.65%	106	9.32%	103	9.06%	14	1.23%	129	11.34%	1,137
St. Clair	64	20.65%	36	11.61%	66	21.29%	58	18.71%	49	15.81%	33	10.65%	4	1.29%	-2	-0.64%	310
Vernon	122	22.39%	82	15.05%	118	21.65%	117	21.47%	46	8.44%	54	9.91%	6	1.10%	4	0.74%	545
Webster (part)	150	20.33%	96	13.01%	251	34.01%	113	15.31%	47	6.37%	69	9.35%	12	1.63%	-101	-13.68%	738
Total	19,971	30.46%	18,192	27.74%	9,620	14.67%	9,043	13.79%	4,889	7.46%	3,228	4.92%	627	0.96%	1,779	2.72%	65,570

=== Libertarian primary ===
==== Nominee ====
- Thomas Holbrook, document imaging specialist

==== Results ====
Libertarian primary results
Party	Candidate	Votes	%
Libertarian	Thomas Holbrook	907	100.0
Total votes		907	100.0

=== General election ===
==== Predictions ====
Source	Ranking	As of
Decision Desk HQ	Safe R	July 14, 2026
The Cook Political Report	Solid R	February 6, 2025
Inside Elections	Solid R	March 7, 2025
Sabato's Crystal Ball	Safe R	July 15, 2025

==== Results ====
2026 Missouri's 4th congressional district election
Party	Candidate	Votes	%
Republican	Mark Alford (incumbent)	154,236	61.46%
Democratic	Jordan Herrera	89,182	35.54%
Libertarian	Thomas Holbrook	7,289	2.91%
Write-in		241	0.09%
Total votes		250,948	100.00%
Republican hold			

== District 5 ==
2026 Missouri's 5th congressional district election
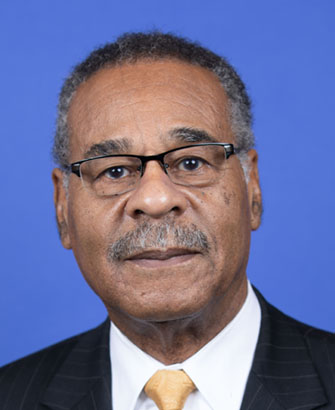

Nominee	Emanuel Cleaver	Rick Brattin
Party	Democratic	Republican
Popular vote	179,256	72,572
Percentage	69.49%	28.13%
- Results by county Cleaver: 60–70% 70–80%
U.S. Representative before election
Emanuel Cleaver
Democratic
Elected U.S. Representative
Emanuel Cleaver
Democratic

Missouri's 5th congressional district boundary used in the primaries of the 2026 elections Interactive map version

Missouri's 5th congressional district boundary used in the general elections for the 2026 elections Interactive map version

The 5th District as used in the primary includes a section of Kansas City, suburban neighborhoods such as Independence in eastern Jackson County and rural stretches of western and Mid-Missouri extending as far as the outskirts of Columbia and Jefferson City.

The 5th district as used in the general election primarily consists of the inner ring of the Kansas City metropolitan area, including nearly all of Kansas City south of the Missouri River.

The incumbent is Democrat Emanuel Cleaver, who was re-elected with 60.2% of the vote in 2024.

=== Democratic primary ===
==== Nominee ====
- Emanuel Cleaver, incumbent U.S. representative

==== Withdrawn ====
- Hartzell Gray, radio host and Kansas City Tenants Union organizer (filed for candidacy in Missouri's 4th congressional district after redistricting)

==== Endorsements ====
Emanuel Cleaver

Labor unions

- American Federation of Government Employees
- Missouri AFL-CIO
- National Education Association

Organizations

- J Street
- Planned Parenthood Action Fund

==== Fundraising ====
Campaign finance reports as of June 30, 2026
Candidate	Raised	Spent	Cash on hand
Emanuel Cleaver (D)	$1,298,255	$1,044,827	$1,143,055
Source: Federal Election Commission

==== Results ====
Democratic primary results
Party	Candidate	Votes	%
Democratic	Emanuel Cleaver (incumbent)	55,237	100.0
Total votes		55,237	100.0

===== Results by county =====
County (Note: The boundaries of the superseded 2026 congressional map were used in the tabulation of these results.)	Emmanuel Cleaver		Total
County	#	%	Total
Boone (part)	2,943	100.00%	2,943
Cole	4,116	100.00%	4,116
Cooper	875	100.00%	875
Howard	586	100.00%	586
Jackson (part)	35,885	100.00%	35,885
Johnson	2,691	100.00%	2,691
Lafayette	1,908	100.00%	1,908
Maries	273	100.00%	273
Miller	575	100.00%	575
Moniteau	437	100.00%	437
Morgan	647	100.00%	647
Osage	427	100.00%	427
Pettis	1,637	100.00%	1,637
Randolph	979	100.00%	979
Saline	1,258	100.00%	1,258
Total	55,237	100.00%	55,237

=== Republican primary ===
==== Nominee ====
- Rick Brattin, state senator from the 31st district (2021–present) and candidate for the 4th district in 2022

==== Eliminated in primary ====
- Micah Beebe, investment specialist
- Taylor Burks, former Boone County clerk, candidate for the 4th district in 2022
- Brett Hueffmeier, attorney
- Berton A. Knox, perennial candidate
- Brad Patty, U.S. Army veteran

==== Withdrawn ====
- Sean Smith, Jackson County legislator and nominee for this district in 2024 (running for state house)

==== Endorsements ====
Rick Brattin

Executive branch officials

- Donald Trump, president of the United States (2017–2021, 2025–present)

Statewide officials

- Mike Kehoe, governor of Missouri (2025–present)
- Vivek Malek, treasurer of Missouri (2022–present)

U.S. representatives

- Eric Burlison, MO-7 (2023–present)
- Bob Onder, MO-3 (2025–present)
- David McIntosh, former IN-2 (1995–2001)

Organizations

- Club for Growth
- Missouri Right to Life
Taylor Burks

U.S. representatives

- Steve Scalise, House Majority Leader (2023–present) and LA-01 (2008–present)
- August Pfluger, TX-11 (2021–present)
- Blaine Luetkemeyer, former MO-09 and MO-03 (2009–2025)
- Vicky Hartzler, former MO-04 (2011–2023)

==== Fundraising ====
Campaign finance reports as of June 30, 2026
Candidate	Raised	Spent	Cash on hand
Rick Brattin (R)	$312,664	$104,166	$208,498
Taylor Burks (R)	$1,147,927	$200,749	$947,177
Brett Hueffmeier (R)	$324,718	$224,222	$100,496
Source: Federal Election Commission

==== Results ====
Republican primary results
Party	Candidate	Votes	%
Republican	Rick Brattin	34,885	45.0
Republican	Taylor Burks	20,455	26.3
Republican	Brad Patty	8,055	10.4
Republican	Brett Hueffmeier	7,686	9.9
Republican	Micah Beebe	4,880	6.3
Republican	Berton A. Knox	1,610	2.1
Total votes		77,571	100.0

===== Results by county =====
County (Note: The boundaries of the superseded 2026 congressional map were used in the tabulation of these results.)	Rick Brattin		Taylor Burks		Brad Patty		Brett Hueffmeier		Micah Beebe		Berton A. Knox		Margin		Total
County	#	%	#	%	#	%	#	%	#	%	#	%	#	%	Total
Boone (part)	1,516	39.09%	1,356	34.97%	406	10.47%	408	10.52%	137	3.53%	55	1.42%	160	4.12%	3,878
Cole	6,266	41.28%	4,300	28.32%	1,403	9.24%	1,792	11.80%	1,116	7.35%	304	2.00%	1,966	12.96%	15,181
Cooper	1,052	39.65%	833	31.40%	287	10.82%	285	10.74%	137	5.16%	59	2.22%	219	8.25%	2,653
Howard	448	28.57%	412	26.28%	527	33.61%	120	7.65%	42	2.68%	19	1.21%	-79	-5.04%	1,568
Jackson (part)	8,026	51.61%	3,180	20.45%	1,498	9.63%	1,432	9.21%	1,114	7.16%	300	1.93%	4,846	31.16%	15,550
Johnson	3,674	61.52%	1,144	19.16%	404	6.76%	361	6.04%	297	4.97%	92	1.54%	2,530	42.36%	5,972
Lafayette	2,775	51.61%	1,315	24.46%	424	7.89%	455	8.46%	316	5.88%	92	1.71%	1,460	27.15%	5,377
Maries	692	36.58%	505	26.69%	244	12.90%	266	14.06%	124	6.55%	61	3.22%	187	9.89%	1,892
Miller	1,704	37.36%	1,428	31.31%	514	11.27%	506	11.09%	288	6.31%	121	2.65%	276	6.05%	4,561
Moniteau	1,288	44.60%	790	27.35%	248	8.59%	293	10.15%	200	6.93%	69	2.39%	498	17.25%	2,888
Morgan	1,363	45.31%	745	24.77%	351	11.67%	295	9.81%	185	6.15%	69	2.29%	618	20.54%	3,008
Osage	1,338	43.08%	904	29.10%	374	12.04%	304	9.79%	136	4.38%	50	1.61%	434	13.98%	3,106
Pettis	2,393	39.51%	1,733	28.61%	776	12.81%	493	8.14%	498	8.22%	164	2.71%	660	10.90%	6,057
Randolph	1,332	39.05%	1,035	30.34%	366	10.73%	419	12.28%	167	4.90%	92	2.70%	297	8.71%	3,411
Saline	1,018	41.23%	775	31.39%	233	9.44%	257	10.41%	123	4.98%	63	2.55%	243	9.84%	2,469
Total	34,885	44.97%	20,455	26.37%	8,055	10.38%	7,686	9.91%	4,880	6.29%	1,610	2.08%	14,430	18.60%	77,571

=== Libertarian primary ===
==== Nominee ====
- Randall "Randy" Langkraehr, business owner

==== Results ====
Libertarian primary results
Party	Candidate	Votes	%
Libertarian	Randall "Randy" Langkraehr	903	100.0
Total votes		903	100.0

=== General election ===
==== Predictions ====
Source	Ranking	As of
Decision Desk HQ	Safe D	October 1, 2026
The Cook Political Report	Solid D	September 11, 2026
Inside Elections	Solid D	September 10, 2026
Sabato's Crystal Ball	Safe D	September 10, 2026

==== Fundraising ====
Campaign finance reports as of October 14, 2026
Candidate	Raised	Spent	Cash on hand
Emanuel Cleaver (D)	$1,766,864	$1,773,543	$882,948
Rick Brattin (R)	$457,467	$457,108	$359
Source: Federal Election Commission

==== Results ====
2026 Missouri's 5th congressional district election
Party	Candidate	Votes	%
Democratic	Emanuel Cleaver (incumbent)	179,256	69.49%
Republican	Rick Brattin	32,308	28.13%
Libertarian	Randall Langkraehr	6,128	2.38%
Total votes		257,956	100.00%
Democratic hold			

== District 6 ==
2026 Missouri's 6th congressional district election

Nominee	Chris Stigall	Josh Smead
Party	Republican	Democratic
Popular vote	151,360	100,450
Percentage	58.70%	38.96%
- Results by county Stigall: 40–50% 50–60% 60–70% 70–80% 80–90% Smead: 50–60%
U.S. Representative before election
Sam Graves
Republican
Elected U.S. Representative
Chris Stigall
Republican

Missouri's 6th congressional district boundary used in the primaries of the 2026 elections Interactive map version

Missouri's 6th congressional district boundary used in the general elections for the 2026 elections Interactive map version

The 6th district encompasses rural northern Missouri, St. Joseph and all of the Kansas City area in the state north of the Missouri River. The incumbent is Republican Sam Graves, who was re-elected with 70.7% of the vote in 2024.

=== Republican primary ===
==== Nominee ====
- Chris Stigall, radio show host

==== Eliminated in primary ====
- James Ingram, business owner
- Cody J. Oshel, pastor
- Nathanael Schultz, business owner
- Nathan Willett, Kansas City councilmember

==== Withdrawn ====
- Sam Graves, incumbent U.S. representative

==== Declined ====
- Mazzie Christensen, state representative from the 2nd district (2023–present)

==== Endorsements ====
Chris Stigall

U.S. representatives

- Sam Graves, MO-6 (2001–present)

Statewide officials

- Catherine Hanaway, attorney general of Missouri (2025–present)
Nathan Willett

Organizations

- Missouri Farm Bureau
- Missouri Fraternal Order of Police
Sam Graves (withdrawn)

Organizations

- AIPAC

==== Fundraising ====
Campaign finance reports as of July 15, 2026
Candidate	Raised	Spent	Cash on hand
James Ingram (R)	$24,600	$17,961	$6,639
Cody Oshel (R)	$7,351	$1,825	$8,026
Nathanael Schultz (R)	$170,507	$24,913	$145,595
Chris Stigall (R)	$599,336	$433,386	$166,050
Nathan Willett (R)	$575,569	$436,244	$139,325
Source: Federal Election Commission

==== Results ====
Republican primary results
Party	Candidate	Votes	%
Republican	Chris Stigall	43,307	44.1
Republican	Nathan Willett	33,664	34.3
Republican	Jim Ingram	8,841	9.0
Republican	Nathanael Schultz	8,494	8.7
Republican	Cody J. Oshel	3,828	3.9
Total votes		98,134	100.0

=== Democratic primary ===
==== Nominee ====
- Josh Smead, architect

==== Eliminated in primary ====
- Matt Levine, transportation security officer
- Scot Pondelick, U.S. Army veteran and combat Explosive Ordnance Disposal (EOD) Specialist

==== Fundraising ====
Campaign finance reports as of July 22, 2026
Candidate	Raised	Spent	Cash on hand
Matt Levine (D)	$53,226	$46,659	$6,566
Scot Pondelick (D)	$49,224	$38,886	$10,338
Josh Smead (D)	$72,101	$55,155	$16,947
Source: Federal Election Commission

==== Results ====
Democratic primary results
Party	Candidate	Votes	%
Democratic	Josh Smead	25,513	47.7
Democratic	Matt Levine	16,173	30.2
Democratic	Scot Pondelick	11,847	22.1
Total votes		53,533	100.0

=== Libertarian primary ===
==== Nominee ====
- Andy Maidment, retired Army officer and IT security professional

==== Results ====
Libertarian primary results
Party	Candidate	Votes	%
Libertarian	Andy Maidment	968	100.0
Total votes		968	100.0

=== General election ===
==== Predictions ====
Source	Ranking	As of
Decision Desk HQ	Safe R	July 14, 2026
The Cook Political Report	Solid R	February 6, 2025
Inside Elections	Solid R	March 7, 2025
Sabato's Crystal Ball	Safe R	July 15, 2025

==== Post-primary endorsements ====
Josh Smead (D)

Labor unions

- Missouri AFL-CIO

==== Results ====
2026 Missouri's 6th congressional district election
Party	Candidate	Votes	%
Republican	Chris Stigall	151,219	58.65%
Democratic	Josh Smead	100,416	38.95%
Libertarian	Andy Maidment	6,028	2.34%
Write-in		161	0.06%
Total votes		257,824	100.00%
Republican hold			

== District 7 ==
2026 Missouri's 7th congressional district election
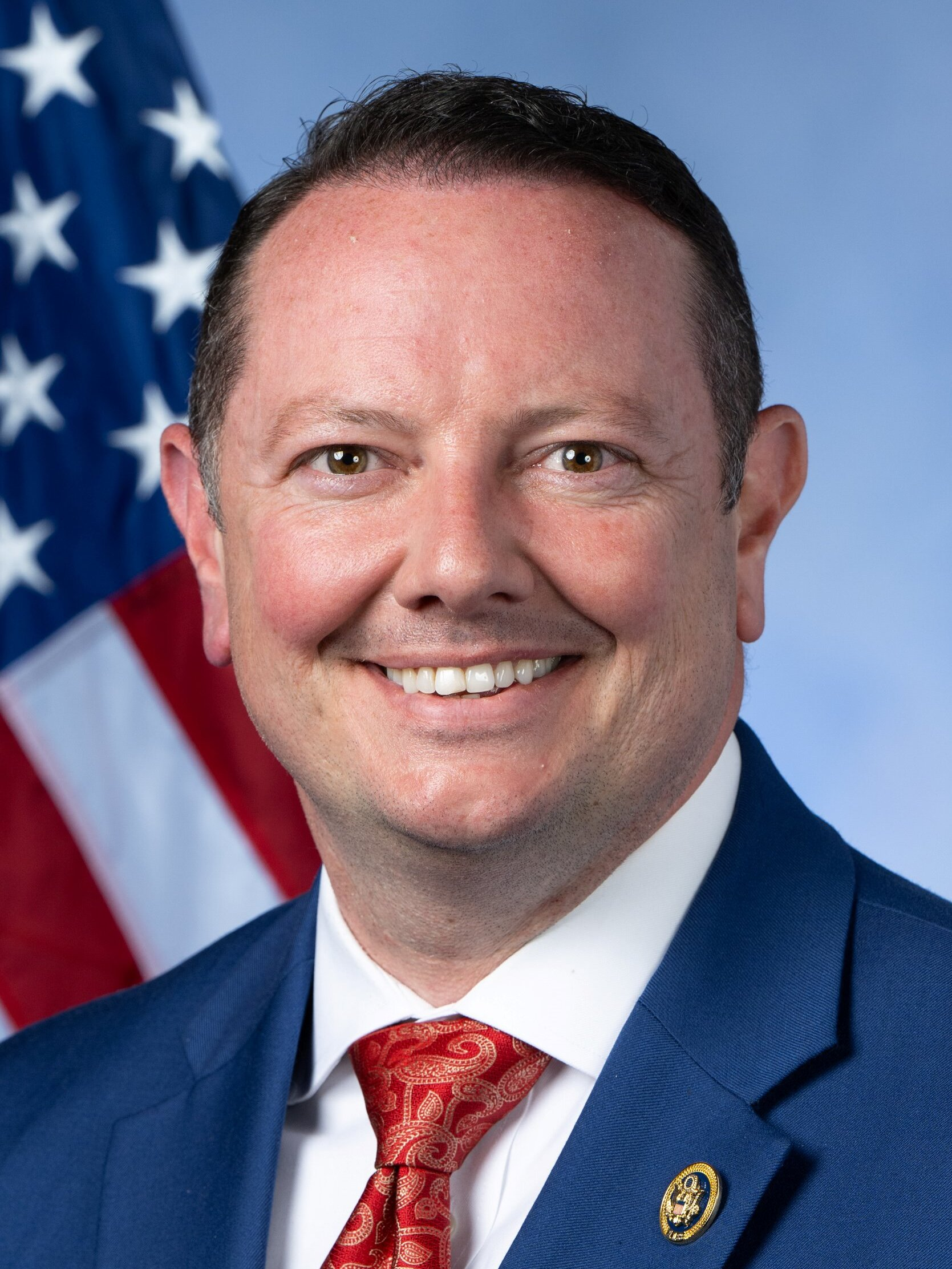

Nominee	Eric Burlison	Missi Hesketh
Party	Republican	Democratic
Popular vote	157,599	89,710
Percentage	62.19%	35.40%
- Results by county Burlison: 50–60% 60–70% 70–80%
U.S. Representative before election
Eric Burlison
Republican
Elected U.S. Representative
Eric Burlison
Republican

Missouri's 7th congressional district boundary from the 2022 elections Interactive map version

The 7th district is located in southwestern Missouri, taking in Springfield, Joplin, Branson, and Nixa. The incumbent is Republican Eric Burlison, who was re-elected with 71.6% of the vote in 2024.

=== Republican primary ===
==== Nominee ====
- Eric Burlison, incumbent U.S. representative

==== Eliminated in primary ====
- John Casey, construction worker
- Grayson Hunt, branch finance manager

==== Endorsements ====
Eric Burlison

Organizations

- AIPAC
- Freedom Caucus Fund

==== Fundraising ====
Campaign finance reports as of March 31, 2026
Candidate	Raised	Spent	Cash on hand
Eric Burlison (R)	$1,111,828	$855,278	$857,937
Grayson Hunt (R)	$7,748	$7,748	$0
Source: Federal Election Commission

==== Results ====
Republican primary results
Party	Candidate	Votes	%
Republican	Eric Burlison (incumbent)	76,418	73.8
Republican	Grayson Hunt	13,665	13.2
Republican	John Casey	13,484	13.0
Total votes		103,567	100.0

=== Democratic primary ===
==== Nominee ====
- Missi Hesketh, former mayor of Forsyth and nominee for this district in 2024

==== Endorsements ====
Missi Hesketh

Organizations

- Center for Freethought Equality
- National Women's Political Caucus

==== Fundraising ====
Campaign finance reports as of June 30, 2026
Candidate	Raised	Spent	Cash on hand
Missi Hesketh (D)	$50,540	$19,734	$35,943
Source: Federal Election Commission

==== Results ====
Democratic primary results
Party	Candidate	Votes	%
Democratic	Missi Hesketh	33,606	100.0
Total votes		33,606	100.0

=== Libertarian primary ===
==== Nominee ====
- Kevin Craig, Christian anarchist

==== Results ====
Libertarian primary results
Party	Candidate	Votes	%
Libertarian	Kevin Craig	905	100.0
Total votes		905	100.0

=== General election ===
==== Predictions ====
Source	Ranking	As of
Decision Desk HQ	Safe R	July 14, 2026
The Cook Political Report	Solid R	February 6, 2025
Inside Elections	Solid R	March 7, 2025
Sabato's Crystal Ball	Safe R	July 15, 2025

==== Post-primary endorsements ====
Missi Hesketh (D)

Labor unions

- Missouri AFL-CIO

Organizations

- Track AIPAC

==== Results ====
2026 Missouri's 7th congressional district election
Party	Candidate	Votes	%
Republican	Eric Burlison (incumbent)	157,599	62.15%
Democratic	Missi Hesketh	89,710	35.38%
Libertarian	Kevin Craig	6,100	2.41%
Write-in		163	0.06%
Total votes		253,572	100.00%
Republican hold			

== District 8 ==
2026 Missouri's 8th congressional district election
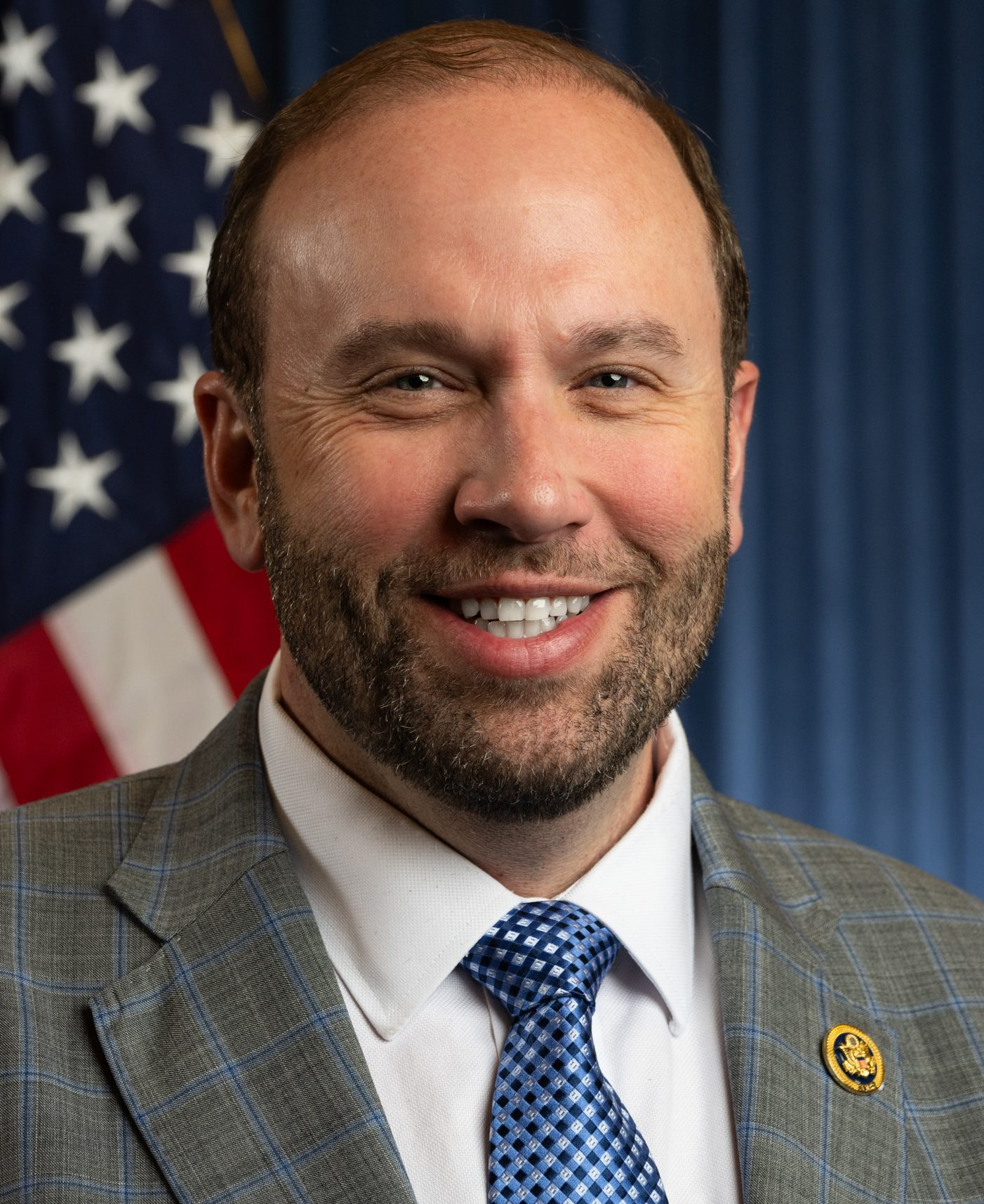

Nominee	Jason Smith	Christopher Riechard
Party	Republican	Democratic
Popular vote	154,445	66,443
Percentage	67.76%	29.15%
- Results by county Smith: 50–60% 60–70% 70–80% 80–90%
U.S. Representative before election
Jason Smith
Republican
Elected U.S. Representative
Jason Smith
Republican

Missouri's 8th congressional district boundary from the 2022 elections Interactive map version

The 8th district is the most rural district of Missouri, taking in rural southeastern Missouri, including the Missouri Bootheel, as well as the cities of Cape Girardeau and Poplar Bluff. The incumbent is Republican Jason Smith, who was re-elected with 76.2% of the vote in 2024.

=== Republican primary ===
==== Nominee ====
- Jason Smith, incumbent U.S. representative

==== Eliminated in primary ====
- Gordon Heslop, retired educator and candidate for Texas's 32nd congressional district in 2026

==== Endorsements ====
Jason Smith

Organizations

- AIPAC
- Missouri Fraternal Order of Police

==== Fundraising ====
Campaign finance reports as of July 15, 2026
Candidate	Raised	Spent	Cash on hand
Jason Smith (R)	$5,264,183	$3,269,224	$5,012,103
Source: Federal Election Commission

==== Results ====
Republican primary results
Party	Candidate	Votes	%
Republican	Jason Smith (incumbent)	94,514	86.0
Republican	Gordon Heslop	15,372	14.0
Total votes		109,886	100.0

=== Democratic primary ===
==== Nominee ====
- Christopher Reichard, construction worker

==== Eliminated in primary ====
- Frank Barnitz, former state senator from the 16th district (2005–2011)

==== Disqualified ====
- Clayton Harbison, tree service contractor

==== Fundraising ====
Campaign finance reports as of July 15, 2026
Candidate	Raised	Spent	Cash on hand
Frank Barnitz (D)	$82,534	$62,734	$19,800
Clayton Harbison (D)	$4,251	$2,017	$1,768
Christopher Reichard (D)	$5,674	$3,732	$1,942
Source: Federal Election Commission

==== Results ====
Democratic primary results
Party	Candidate	Votes	%
Democratic	Christopher Reichard	15,344	54.1
Democratic	Frank Barnitz	13,003	45.9
Total votes		28,347	100.0

=== Libertarian primary ===
==== Nominee ====
- Rebecca Sharpe Lombard, Ward 6 treasurer for the Libertarian Party of Missouri

==== Results ====
Libertarian primary results
Party	Candidate	Votes	%
Libertarian	Rebecca Sharpe Lombard	728	100.0
Total votes		728	100.0

=== General election ===
==== Predictions ====
Source	Ranking	As of
Decision Desk HQ	Safe R	July 14, 2026
The Cook Political Report	Solid R	February 6, 2025
Inside Elections	Solid R	March 7, 2025
Sabato's Crystal Ball	Safe R	July 15, 2025

==== Post-primary endorsements ====
Christopher Reichard (D)

Labor unions

- Missouri AFL-CIO

==== Results ====
2026 Missouri's 8th congressional district election
Party	Candidate	Votes	%
Republican	Jason Smith (incumbent)	152,677	67.73%
Democratic	Chris Reichard	65,751	29.17%
Libertarian	Rebecca Sharpe Lombard	6,996	3.10
Total votes		225,424	100.00%
Republican hold			

== Notes ==
Partisan clients
