= List of bills in the 114th United States Congress =

The bills of the 114th United States Congress list includes proposed federal laws that were introduced in the 114th United States Congress. This Congress lasted from January 3, 2015 to January 3, 2017.

== Overview ==
The United States Congress is the bicameral legislature of the federal government of the United States consisting of two houses: the lower house known as the House of Representatives and the upper house known as the Senate. The House and Senate are equal partners in the legislative process—legislation cannot be enacted without the consent of both chambers. The bills listed below are arranged on the basis of which chamber they were first introduced in, and then chronologically by date.

Once a bill is approved by one house, it is sent to the other which may pass, reject, or amend it. For the bill to become law, both houses must agree to identical versions of the bill. After passage by both houses, a bill is enrolled and sent to the president for signature or veto. Bills from the 114th Congress that have successfully completed this process become public laws, listed as Acts of the 114th United States Congress.

== Introduced in the House of Representatives ==
=== Bills ===
H.R. number	Date of introduction	Short title	Description
H.R. 3	January 6, 2015	Keystone XL Pipeline Act	To approve the Keystone XL Pipeline
H.R. 21	January 6, 2015	To provide for a comprehensive assessment of the scientific and technical research on the implications of the use of mid-level ethanol blends, and for other purposes.	To approve a study on the use of mid-level ethanol blends.
H.R. 22	January 6, 2015	Hire More Heroes Act of 2015	A bill to exempt employees of the Department of Defense from classification as eligible employees of an applicable large employer for purposes of the employer mandate under the Patient Protection and Affordable Care Act.
H.R. 26	January 6, 2015	Terrorism Risk Insurance Program Reauthorization Act of 2015	Amends the Terrorism Risk Insurance Act of 2002 to extend the Terrorism Insurance Program through December 31, 2020.
H.R. 234	January 8, 2015	Cyber Intelligence Sharing and Protection Act (CISPA)	Directs the federal government to provide for the real-time sharing of actionable, situational cyber threat information between all designated federal cyber operations centers to enable integrated actions to protect, prevent, mitigate, respond to, and recover from cyber incidents.
H.R. 870	February 11, 2015	Puerto Rico Chapter 9 Uniformity Act of 2015	To amend title 11 of the United States Code to treat Puerto Rico as a State for purposes of chapter 9 of such title relating to the adjustment of debts of municipalities.
H.R. 1572	March 24, 2015,	Boycott Our Enemies, not Israel Act	To require certifications by prospective contractors with the United States Government that they are not boycotting persons, and for other purposes.
H.R. 1735	April 13, 2015	National Defense Authorization Act for Fiscal Year 2016	The National Defense Authorization Act for Fiscal Year 2016 is a comprehensive defense spending bill. At almost 1,000 pages long it will direct funding for procurement, research, and operation of defense technology, establish military policy, and address other matters pertaining to national defense. It has been passed by the House with 19 amendments, and is currently being reviewed by the Senate with 333 amendments proposed.
H.R. 2450	May 19, 2015	Therapeutic Fraud Prevention Act	Prohibits sexual orientation or gender identity conversion therapy from being provided in exchange for monetary compensation. Bars advertisements for such therapy that claim to: (1) change an individual's sexual orientation or gender identity, (2) eliminate or reduce sexual or romantic attractions or feelings toward individuals of the same gender, or (3) be harmless or without risk. Makes this Act inapplicable to practices that do not seek to change sexual orientation or gender identity if the therapy provides: (1) assistance to an individual undergoing a gender transition; or (2) acceptance, support, and understanding of clients or facilitation of clients' coping, social support, and identity exploration and development, including sexual orientation-neutral interventions to prevent or address unlawful conduct or unsafe sexual practices. Provides authority to Federal Trade Commission to enforce this Act and treats violations as unfair or deceptive acts or practices under the Federal Trade Commission Act.
H.R. 3185	July 23, 2015	Equality Act	Amends the Civil Rights Act of 1964 to include sex, sexual orientation, and gender identity among the prohibited categories of discrimination or segregation in places of public accommodation.

=== House resolutions ===
H.R. number	Date of introduction	Short title	Description

=== Concurrent resolutions ===
Number	Date of introduction	Short title	Description

=== House joint resolutions ===
Number	Date of introduction	Short title	Description

== Introduced in the Senate ==
=== Bills ===
Senate number	Date of introduction	Short title	Description
S. 1	January 6, 2015	Keystone XL Pipeline Approval Act	To approve the Keystone XL Pipeline.
S. 483	February 12, 2015	Ensuring Patient Access and Effective Drug Enforcement Act	To improve enforcement efforts related to prescription drug diversion and abuse, and for other purposes.
S. 1858	July 23, 2015	Equality Act	Amends the Civil Rights Act of 1964 to include sex, sexual orientation, and gender identity among the prohibited categories of discrimination or segregation in places of public accommodation.

=== Concurrent resolutions ===
Senate number	Date of introduction	Short title	Description

=== Senate joint resolutions ===
Senate number	Date of introduction	Short title	Description

== See also ==
- List of United States federal legislation
- Acts of the 114th United States Congress
- Procedures of the U.S. Congress
