= Rex Rector =

American politician (1950–2020)

Member of the Missouri House of Representatives from the 24th district
- In office January 3, 2001 – January 3, 2007
- Preceded by: Vicky Hartzler
- Succeeded by: Luke Scavuzzo

Personal details
- Born: December 28, 1950 Rockville, Missouri
- Died: November 5, 2020 (aged 69) Harrisonville, Missouri
- Party: Republican

Rex Rector (December 28, 1950 – November 5, 2020) was an American politician who served in the Missouri House of Representatives from the 24th district from 2001 to 2007.

He died of a stroke on November 5, 2020, in Harrisonville, Missouri at age 69.
