= Rick Brattin =

American politician

Member of the Missouri Senate from the 31st district
- Incumbent
- Assumed office January 6, 2021
- Preceded by: Ed Emery

Member of the Missouri House of Representatives from the 55th district
- In office January 9, 2013 – January 9, 2019
- Preceded by: Sheila Solon (redistricted)
- Succeeded by: Mike Haffner

Member of the Missouri House of Representatives from the 124th district
- In office January 5, 2011 – January 9, 2013
- Preceded by: Luke Scavuzzo
- Succeeded by: Rocky Miller (redistricted)

Personal details
- Born: Richard Ray Brattin Jr. July 22, 1980 (age 46) Greenwood, Missouri, U.S.
- Party: Republican
- Website: Campaign website

Richard Ray Brattin Jr. (born July 22, 1980) is an American politician serving as a Republican state senator from Missouri, representing the 31st district, composing of Cass, Bates, Barton, Henry, and Vernon counties. He is a former state representative, having served three terms in the Missouri House of Representatives. He represented Missouri's 55th Legislative District, which encompasses several suburbs of Kansas City in Cass County, including Raymore, Peculiar, and Lake Winnebago. He is currently vice chairman of the Corrections and Consumer Affairs committees.

Brattin is a candidate for the 2026 United States House of Representatives elections in Missouri for Missouri's 5th congressional district.

== Early life and military career ==
Brattin was born on July 22, 1980. He was raised in Greenwood, Missouri, and is a graduate of Lee's Summit High School.

After the September 11 attacks, he joined the United States Marine Corps. He rose through the ranks and became a sergeant after six years. He was elected to the Missouri House of Representatives in 2010.

== Issues ==
=== Abortion ===
In December 2014, Brattin proposed legislation that would require women seeking abortions in Missouri to obtain written consent from the father of the fetus, except in cases of "legitimate rape." Brattin cited his own recent vasectomy as his inspiration for the legislation.

In Feb 2024, while debating an amendment to allow abortions for rape or incest, Brattin advocated that a rape victim be forced to carry the rapist's fetus to term. He indicated supporting the death penalty for rapists, and suggested that the resulting baby, "by God’s grace, may even be the greatest healing agent you need in which to recover from such an atrocity."

=== Drones ===
In 2025, Brattin sponsored legislation to ban law enforcement agencies from purchasing Chinese drones. Representatives from the Law Enforcement Drone Association and first responder groups opposed the bill. Testimonies ranged from accusations that the bill serves lobbyists for American drone manufacturers to detailed explanations on the security measures for drone operations.

=== Education ===
In 2013, Brattin sponsored legislation that would afford equal treatment in textbooks for intelligent design and evolution.

In January 2017, Brattin proposed a bill to end tenure in public universities in Missouri. The bill would also "require public colleges to publish estimated costs of degrees, employment opportunities expected for graduates, average salaries of previous graduates, and a summary of the job market, among other things."

In 2026, Brattin sponsored a bill that would eliminate state funds, including financial aid and operational costs, for "low earning" college degrees. Opposition to the bill identified that impacted professions would include teaching, research and nursing.

=== Election ===
In 2025, Brattin sponsored a bill to increase Secretary of State authority in crafting ballot language. The previous year, a judge struck down Jay Ashcroft's description of a voter-initiated petition following a lawsuit from the drafters. The Labor Tribune described the bill as the "Let Politicians Lie Act."

In January 2026, the Supreme Court of Missouri unanimously struck down SB 22, the "Let Politicians Lie Act", ruling the legislation had been changed during the legislative process in violation of the Missouri Constitution's prohibition against altering a bill's original purpose. Following the ruling, Brattin criticized the court, and the annual State of the Judiciary address was canceled after Missouri Senate Republicans indicated they would boycott the joint session over recent court decisions, including the ruling on SB 22. Brattin subsequently sponsored Senate Bill 1615, which the Missouri Senate described as substantially similar to the ballot-language provisions of SB 22. The bill was referred to committee but did not advance further.

=== Free speech ===
In 2015, in response to a protest by the University of Missouri football team related to campus discrimination, Brattin proposed a bill that would strip a college athlete of their scholarship if the athlete "calls, incites, supports or participates in any strike or concerted refusal to play a scheduled game."

In 2021, the state senator proposed a bill that would target unlawful assemblies, including the use of deadly force against protesters on private property.

=== Homosexuality ===
In 2017, Brattin made a statement on the Missouri House floor that "When you look at the tenets of religion, of the Bible, of the Qur’an, of other religions, there is a distinction between homosexuality and just being a human being." The Kansas City Star called his position intolerant and said in an editorial, "The statement, made on the Missouri House floor, was deplorable. It betrayed a stunning lack of understanding of theology and self-government: The Constitution protects all Americans from the tyranny of any single faith-based approach to secular law."

=== Libraries ===
In July 2026, Brattin held a press conference with Denny Hoskins announcing investigations into the Daniel Boone Regional Library's "Rainbow story time" featuring two picture books with LGBTQ themes. Brattin told press that if the story time was found to be legal, he would file bills to make it illegal in the future.

=== Medicaid ===
In 2024, Brattin participated in a 25 hour filibuster of taxes necessary to fund Medicaid, citing his concerns about abortion, which is already illegal in Missouri. Republicans Lincoln Hough and Mike Parson described the act as "pathetic political gamesmanship" and "deliberate dysfunction."

=== Paid sick leave ===
In 2025, Brattin gave testimony against a voter initiative for guaranteed paid sick leave passed the previous year. In his speech, he argued against direct democracy, saying that voters did not have "skin in the game" or understand business bottom line.

=== Religious freedom ===
In 2025, Brattin interrupted a minister's testimony and cut time to other religious leaders who described a bill requiring the display of the Ten Commandments in schools as government overreach.

=== Stadium funding ===
In 2025, Brattin voted in favor of $1.5 billion in tax incentives for the Kansas City stadium deal. The vote was opposed by current and former members of the Missouri Freedom Caucus, who criticized the deal as a “handout to billionaire sports team owners.” Brattin's vote was secured based on an added provision related to local property taxes. Brattin stepped down as chair of the Freedom Caucus a few days after.

=== Welfare ===
In February 2015, Brattin introduced Missouri House Bill 813, reading "A recipient of supplemental nutrition assistance program benefits shall not use such benefits to purchase cookies, chips, energy drinks, soft drinks, seafood, or steak."

== Defamation lawsuit ==
In April 2024, Brattin was sued for defamation by Denton Loudermill, Jr., a father of three of Olathe, Kansas, after Brattin posted a picture of Loudermill in handcuffs on social media with false accusations labeling him as an undocumented immigrant and the perpetrator of the 2024 Kansas City parade shooting. At a news conference in February 2024, Brattin stated that he and others who shared false information about the shooting had nothing to apologize for. In April 2025, Loudermill was found dead from drug overdose at his home, having suffered from depression and harassment related to the wrongful accusations over the previous year.

== Electoral history ==
=== State representative ===
Missouri House of Representatives Election, November 2, 2010, District 124
Party	Candidate	Votes	%	±%
Republican	Rick Brattin	8,100	51.29%	+9.74
Democratic	Luke Scavuzzo	7,335	46.44%	−12.01
Constitution	Kent Cogan	359	2.27%	+2.27

Missouri House of Representatives Election, November 6, 2012, District 55
Party	Candidate	Votes	%	±%
Republican	Rick Brattin	11,747	65.50%	+14.21
Democratic	Jim White	6,465	34.50%	−11.94

Missouri House of Representatives Election, November 4, 2014, District 55
Party	Candidate	Votes	%	±%
Republican	Rick Brattin	8,362	100%	+34.50

Missouri House of Representatives Election, November 8, 2016, District 55
Party	Candidate	Votes	%	±%
Republican	Rick Brattin	12,350	63.37%	−36.63
Democratic	Ashley Beard-Fosnow	7,139	36.63%	+36.63

=== State Senate ===
Missouri Senate Primary Election, August 4, 2020, District 31
Party	Candidate	Votes	%	±%
Republican	Rick Brattin	14,012	49.59	N/A
Republican	Jack Bondon	12,467	44.13	N/A
Republican	Bill Yarberry	1,774	6.28	N/A

Missouri Senate General Election, November 3, 2020, District 31
Party	Candidate	Votes	%	±%
Republican	Rick Brattin	63,929	71.42	−1.01
Democratic	Raymond Kinney	25,584	28.58	+28.58

=== U.S. Representative ===
Missouri Congressional Primary Election, August 2, 2022, Missouri's 4th congressional district
Party	Candidate	Votes	%	±%
Republican	Mark Alford	36,981	35.18%	
Republican	Rick Brattin	22,509	21.42%	
Republican	Kalena Bruce	16,677	15.87%	
Republican	Taylor Burks	10,624	10.11%	
Republican	William (Bill) Irwin	9,648	9.18%	
Republican	Jim (Soupy) Campbell	4,642	4.42%	
Republican	Kyle Stonner LaBrue	4,026	3.83%	
Total votes		105,107	100.00%	

== Personal life ==
Brattin is married and has five children. He lives in Harrisonville, Missouri.
