= Fred Wellman =

American politician (b. 1965)

- Official portrait, 2026

Member-elect of the U.S. House of Representatives from Missouri's 2nd district
- Assuming office January 3, 2027
- Succeeding: Ann Wagner

Personal details
- Born: Frederick Paul Wellman; September 4, 1965 (age 61) New Jersey, U.S.
- Party: Democratic
- Education: United States Military Academy (BS); Harvard University (MPP)

Military service
- Branch/service: United States Army; Army Reserve
- Years of service: 1987–2000; 2001–2010
- Rank: Lieutenant colonel
- Battles/wars: Gulf War; Iraq War

Frederick Paul Wellman (born September 4, 1965) is an American politician, retired Army officer, and podcast host who is the member-elect to the United States House of Representatives for Missouri's 2nd congressional district. He is a member of the Democratic Party.

== Early life and education ==
Wellman was born in New Jersey on September 4, 1965, and moved to Kirkwood, Missouri, as an infant. In 1983, he graduated from Kirkwood High School. In 1987, he graduated from West Point Military Academy. Wellman later earned a Master of Public Policy from Harvard Kennedy School.

== Military career ==
Wellman served in the United States Army for 22 years, including four combat deployments during the Gulf War and Iraq War. As a first lieutenant, he flew OH-58C Kiowa scout helicopters with the 24th Infantry Division in Operation Desert Storm. In 1993, he graduated from Ranger school, earning the coveted Ranger tab. In 1995, he was appointed commander of the 1st Battalion, 25th Aviation Regiment, a Cobra-equipped attack helicopter company based in Hawaii. In April 2000, he left active duty and joined the Army Reserve.

After the September 11 attacks, Wellman returned to active duty. He trained to fly UH-60 Black Hawk helicopters and was assigned to the 101st Airborne Division. In September 2002, he was the operations officer for the 6th Battalion, 101st Aviation Regiment. His unit was stationed briefly in Baghdad, then at Q-West base in southeast Ninevah province. In 2003, as a major, he became the executive officer of 6th Battalion. In 2004, he left Army aviation and became a public-affairs officer. Wellman retired as a lieutenant colonel in 2010.

== Private career ==
After retiring from military service, Wellman launched a communications firm called Scout Comms. After operating for about a decade, the business failed in 2020 amid the COVID-19 pandemic, and Wellman declared Chapter 7 bankruptcy. Soon he was hired as executive director of The Lincoln Project, a political action committee (PAC) founded in December 2019 by moderate conservatives and former Republican Party members who oppose U.S. president Donald Trump and Trumpism.

== U.S. House of Representatives ==
Wellman defeated incumbent Republican Ann Wagner in the 2026 election for Missouri's 2nd congressional district. He is the first Democrat to be elected to represent that district since Joan Kelly Horn in 1990.

U.S. House of Representatives
Preceded by Ann Wagner	Member of the U.S. House of Representatives from Missouri's 2nd congressional district Taking office 2027	Elect
