= Luke Scavuzzo =

American politician

Member of the Missouri House of Representatives from the 124th district
- In office January 3, 2007 – January 5, 2011
- Preceded by: Rex Rector
- Succeeded by: Rick Brattin

Personal details
- Born: March 10, 1956 (age 70) Harrisonville, Missouri
- Party: Democratic

Luke Scavuzzo (born March 10, 1956) is an American politician who served in the Missouri House of Representatives from the 124th district from 2007 to 2011.
