= Vicky Hartzler =

American politician (born 1960)

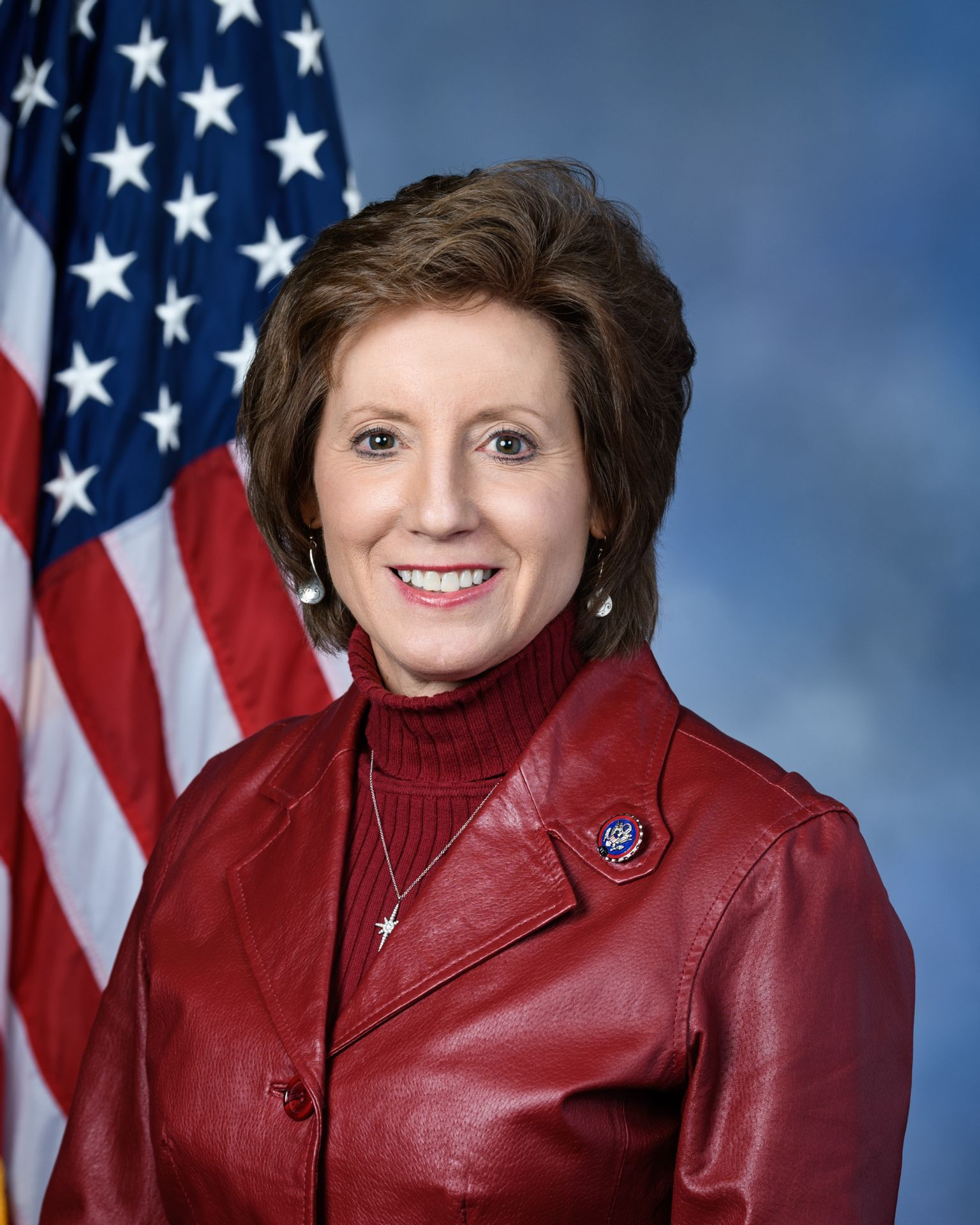
- Official portrait, 2021

Chair of the U.S. Commission on International Religious Freedom
- In office June 9, 2025 – May 14, 2026
- Preceded by: Stephen Schneck
- Succeeded by: Asif Mahmood

Member of the U.S. House of Representatives from Missouri's 4th district
- In office January 3, 2011 – January 3, 2023
- Preceded by: Ike Skelton
- Succeeded by: Mark Alford

Member of the Missouri House of Representatives from the 124th district
- In office January 4, 1995 – January 3, 2001
- Preceded by: Gene Olson
- Succeeded by: Rex Rector

Personal details
- Born: Vicky Jo Zellmer; October 13, 1960 (age 66) Archie, Missouri, U.S.
- Party: Republican
- Spouse: Lowell Hartzler
- Children: 1
- Education: University of Missouri (BS); University of Central Missouri (MS)

Vicky Jo Hartzler (née Zellmer; born October 13, 1960) is an American politician and businesswoman who served as the U.S. representative for Missouri's 4th congressional district from 2011 to 2023. A member of the Republican Party, she served as the Missouri state representative for the 124th district from 1995 to 2001.

Hartzler's congressional district comprised a large swath of western-central Missouri, anchored in Columbia and stretching to the eastern and southern Kansas City suburbs, including a sliver of Kansas City. The district also included Sedalia, Warrensburg, Moberly, and Lebanon.

Hartzler was a candidate in the 2022 United States Senate election in Missouri, but lost the Republican primary to Eric Schmitt. She later served as the Chair of the U.S. Commission on International Religious Freedom from 2025-2026.

== Early life and education ==
Hartzler was raised on a farm near Archie, a rural community south of Kansas City. She graduated from Archie High School and later attended the University of Missouri, where she graduated summa cum laude with a B.S. in education, and the University of Central Missouri, where she graduated with an M.S. in education.

== Missouri legislature ==
Before running for state representative in 1994, Hartzler taught high school home economics for 11 years.

She left the Missouri House of Representatives in 2000 after adopting a baby daughter. In 2004, Hartzler served as state spokeswoman for the Coalition to Protect Marriage, which supported banning same-sex marriage in Missouri. In 2000, Hartzler opposed the Missouri Assembly's ratification of the Equal Rights Amendment (ERA) and led a group of legislators in a rally against the ERA, saying she didn't "want women used to pass a liberal agenda". In 2005, Governor Matt Blunt appointed Hartzler chair of the Missouri Women's Council, where she served for two years.

== U.S. House of Representatives ==
=== Elections ===
==== 2010 ====
After almost a decade out of politics, Hartzler entered the Republican primary for Missouri's 4th congressional district, which at the time was held by 17-term Democratic incumbent Ike Skelton. She won a seven-way primary with 40% of the vote.

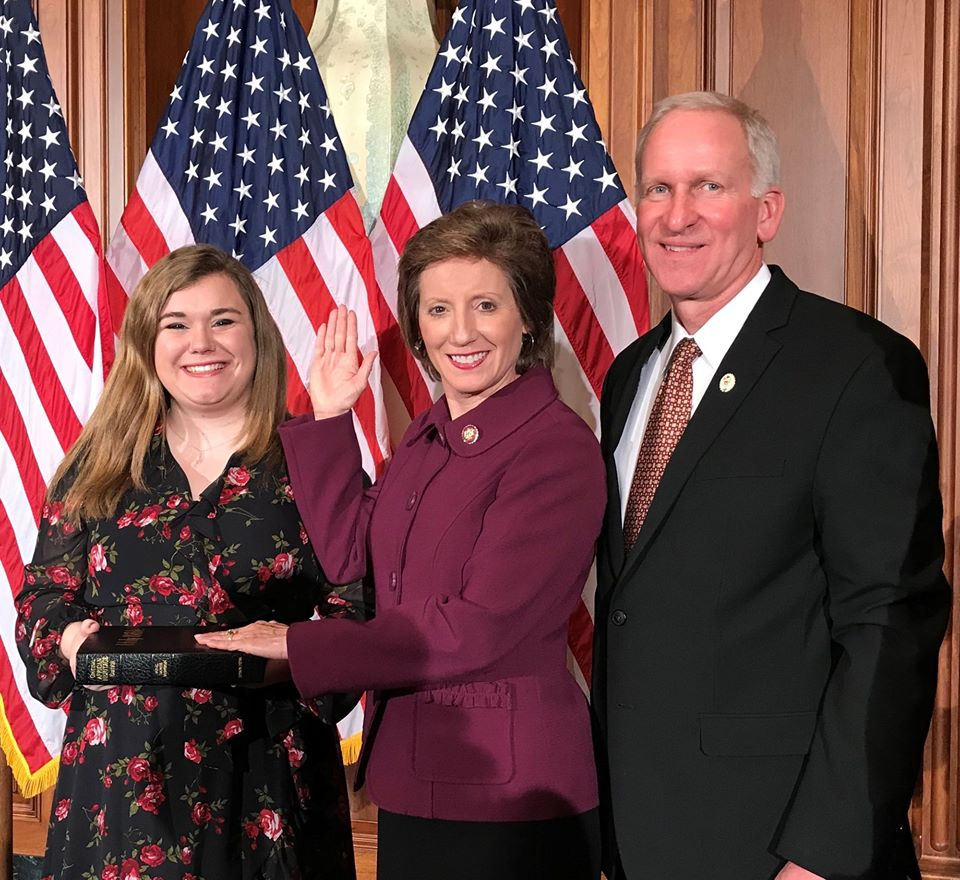
Hartzler and family at swearing in ceremony at the United States House of Representatives

Hartzler ran on a conservative platform, voicing support for tax cuts and spending cuts. She opposes abortion and same-sex marriage.

Hartzler won the November 2 general election with 50.43% of the vote. She is the first Republican to represent the district since 1955, and only the second since the Great Depression. She was also the second Republican woman elected to Congress from Missouri, after Jo Ann Emerson, with whom she served from 2011 to 2013. She is the first who was not elected as a stand-in for her husband; Emerson was originally elected to serve out the final term of her late husband, Bill Emerson.

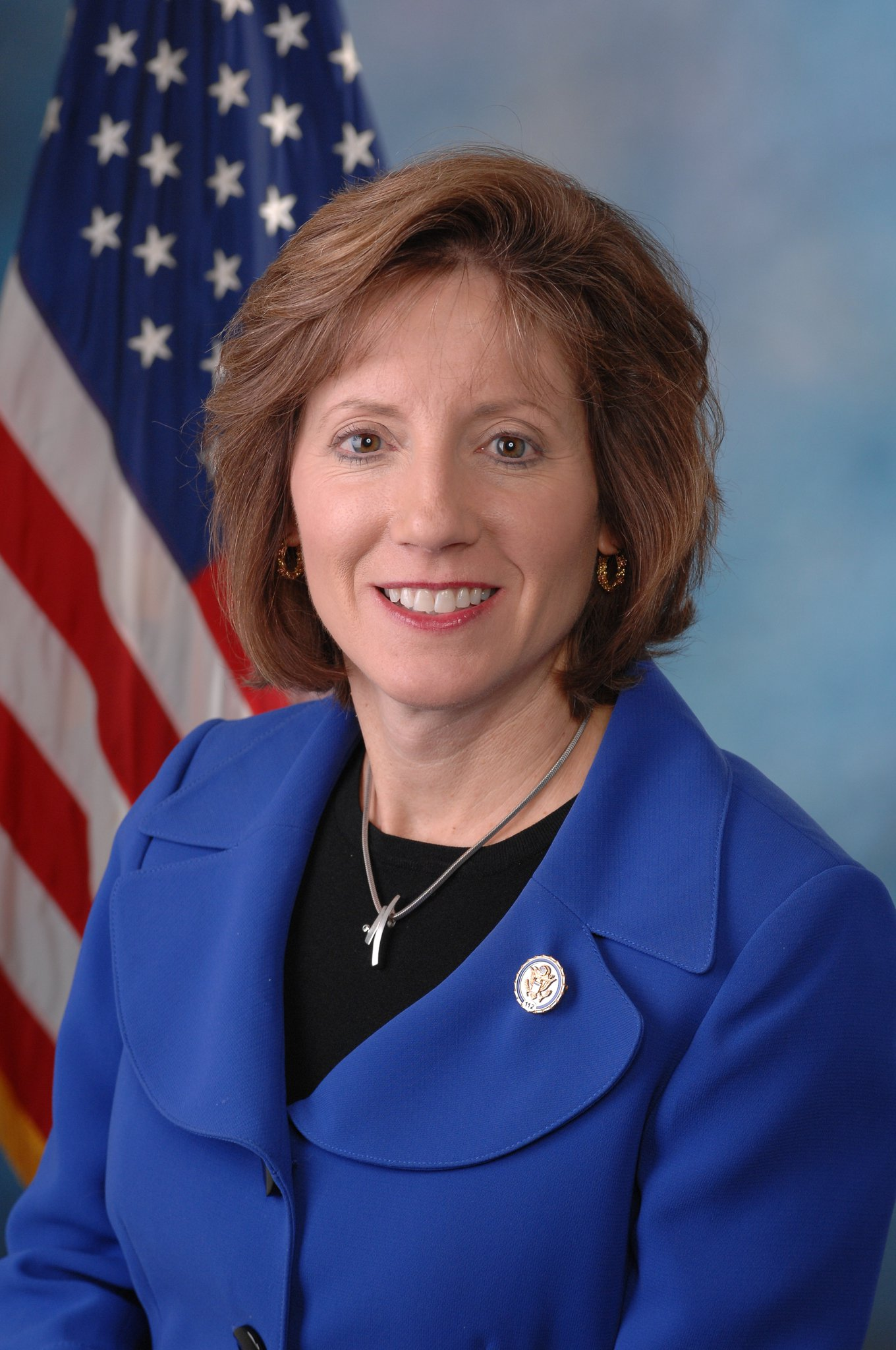
Official Portrait, 112th Congress

Missouri's 4th congressional district election, 2010
Party	Candidate	Votes	%
Republican	Vicky Hartzler	113,489	50.43
Democratic	Ike Skelton (incumbent)	101,532	45.11
Libertarian	Jason Michael Braun	6,123	2.72
Constitution	Greg Cowan	3,912	1.74

==== 2012 ====
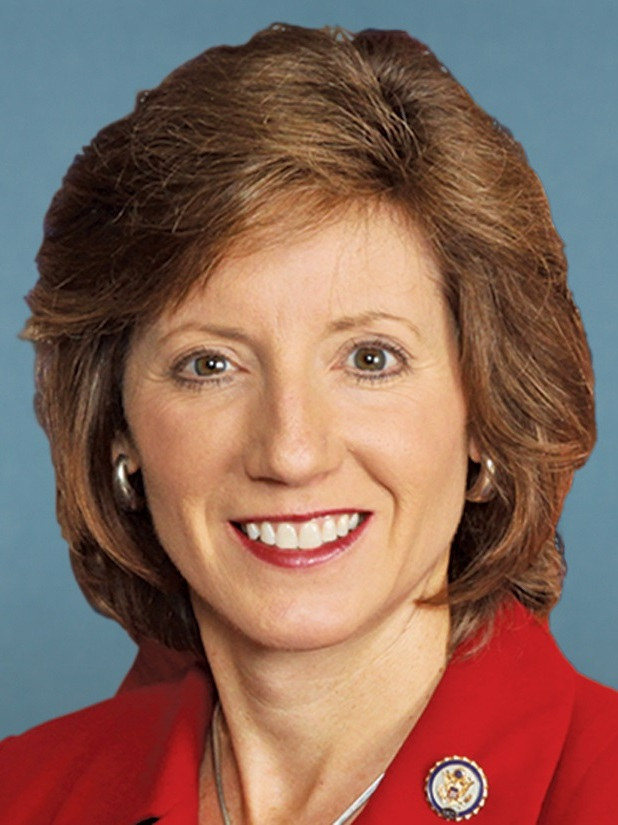
Official Portrait, 113th Congress

During her first term, Hartzler represented a district that stretched as far east as the state capital, Jefferson City, and as far west as exurban areas of Jackson County. Redistricting after the 2010 U.S. Census removed Cole, Lafayette, Ray and Saline counties—including Skelton's home. The district also lost its shares of Jackson and Webster counties. In its place, the district picked up all of Boone, Cooper, Howard, and Randolph counties, part of Audrain County, and the remainder of Cass County. The district now includes Cass County's portion of Kansas City.

At a town hall meeting in Missouri on April 5, 2012, Hartzler expressed doubts about President Barack Obama's birth certificate.

In her first contest in the newly drawn district, Hartzler easily won the Republican primary with 84% of the vote against Bernie Mowinski and went on to win the general election with 60.3% against the Democratic nominee, Cass County Prosecuting Attorney Teresa Hensley.

Missouri's 4th congressional district election, 2012
Party	Candidate	Votes	%
Republican	Vicky Hartzler	192,237	60.32
Democratic	Teresa Hensley	113,120	35.49
Libertarian	Thomas Holbrook	10,407	3.27
Constitution	Greg Cowan	2,959	0.93

==== 2014 ====
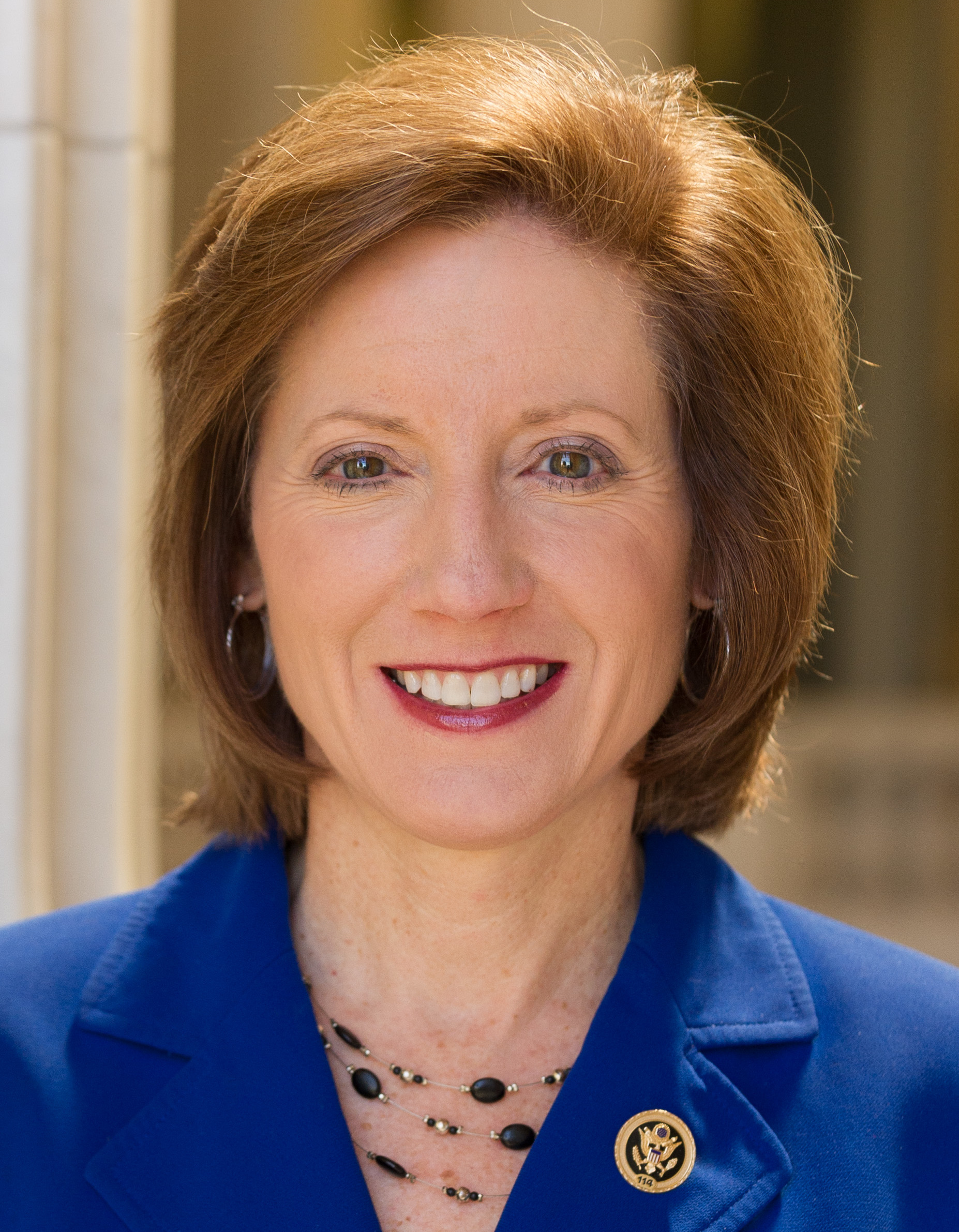
Official Portrait, 114th Congress

Hartzler won nearly 75% of the vote in the Republican primary against John Webb, then won the general election by a more than two-to-one margin.

Missouri's 4th congressional district election, 2014
Party	Candidate	Votes	%
Republican	Vicky Hartzler	120,014	68.08
Democratic	Nate Irvin	46,464	26.36
Libertarian	Herschel L. Young	9,793	5.56
Write-In	Greg Cowan	15	0.01

==== 2016 ====
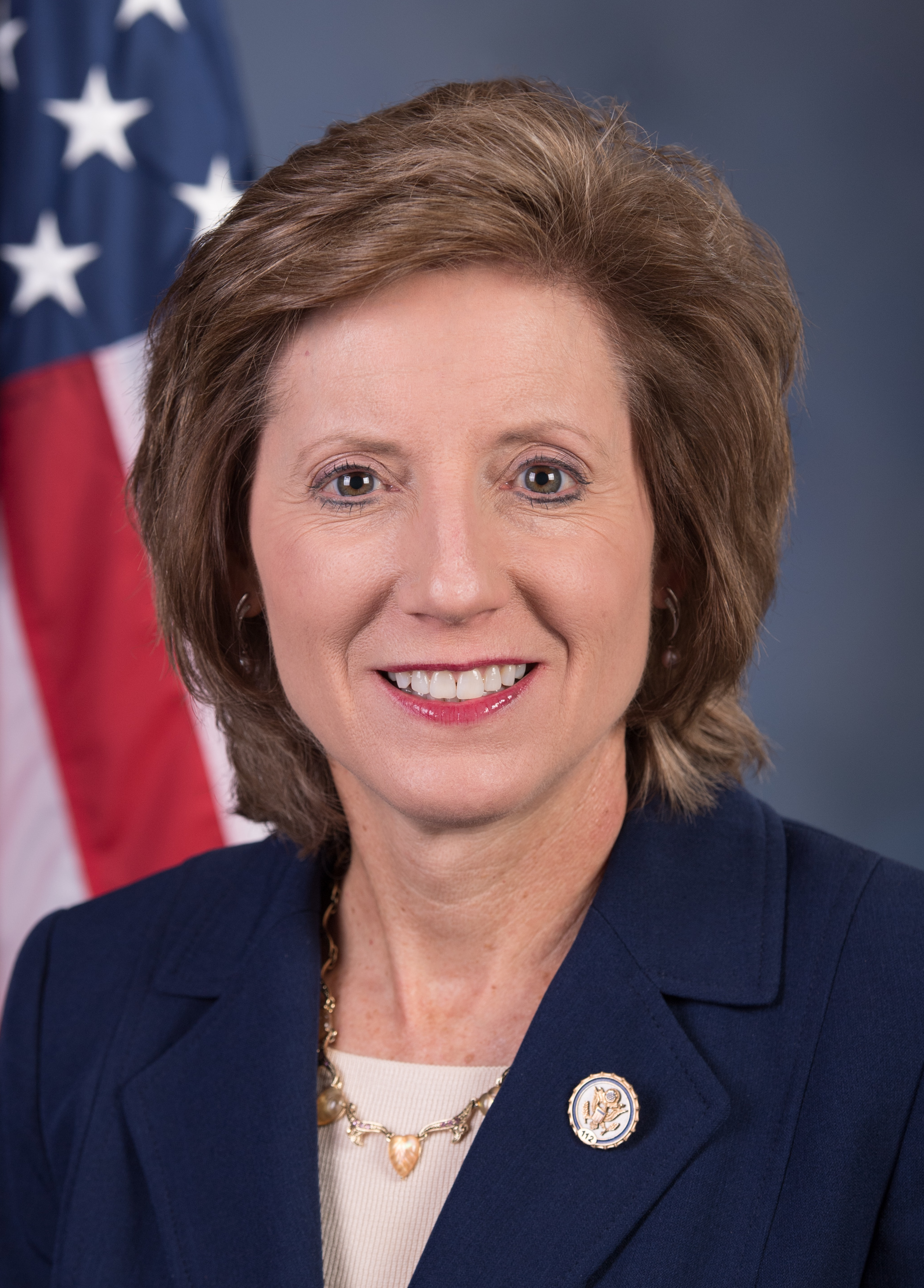
Official Portrait, 115th Congress

Hartzler won 72% of the vote in the Republican primary against John Webb, then won the general election by a more than two-to-one margin.

Missouri's 4th congressional district election, 2016
Party	Candidate	Votes	%
Republican	Vicky Hartzler	225,348	67.83
Democratic	Gordon Christensen	92,510	27.85
Libertarian	Mark Bliss	14,376	4.33

==== 2018 ====
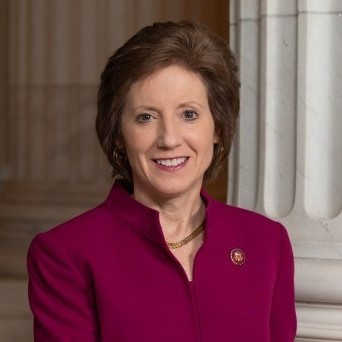
Official Portrait, 116th Congress

Hartzler won 73.5% of the vote in the Republican primary against John Webb, then won the general election with 64.8% of the vote.

Missouri's 4th congressional district, 2018
Party	Candidate	Votes	%
Republican	Vicky Hartzler (incumbent)	190,138	64.8
Democratic	Renee Hoagenson	95,968	32.7
Libertarian	Mark Bliss	7,210	2.5
Total votes		293,316	100.0
Republican hold			

==== 2020 ====
Missouri's 4th congressional district, 2020
Party	Candidate	Votes	%
Republican	Vicky Hartzler (incumbent)	245,247	67.6
Democratic	Lindsey Simmons	107,635	29.7
Libertarian	Steven K. Koonse	9,954	2.7
Total votes		362,836	100.0
Republican hold			

=== Committee assignments ===
- Committee on Agriculture
  - Subcommittee on Biotechnology, Horticulture, and Research
  - Subcommittee on Livestock and Foreign Agriculture
- Committee on Armed Services
  - Subcommittee on Tactical Air and Land Forces, Ranking Member
  - Subcommittee on Seapower and Projection Forces

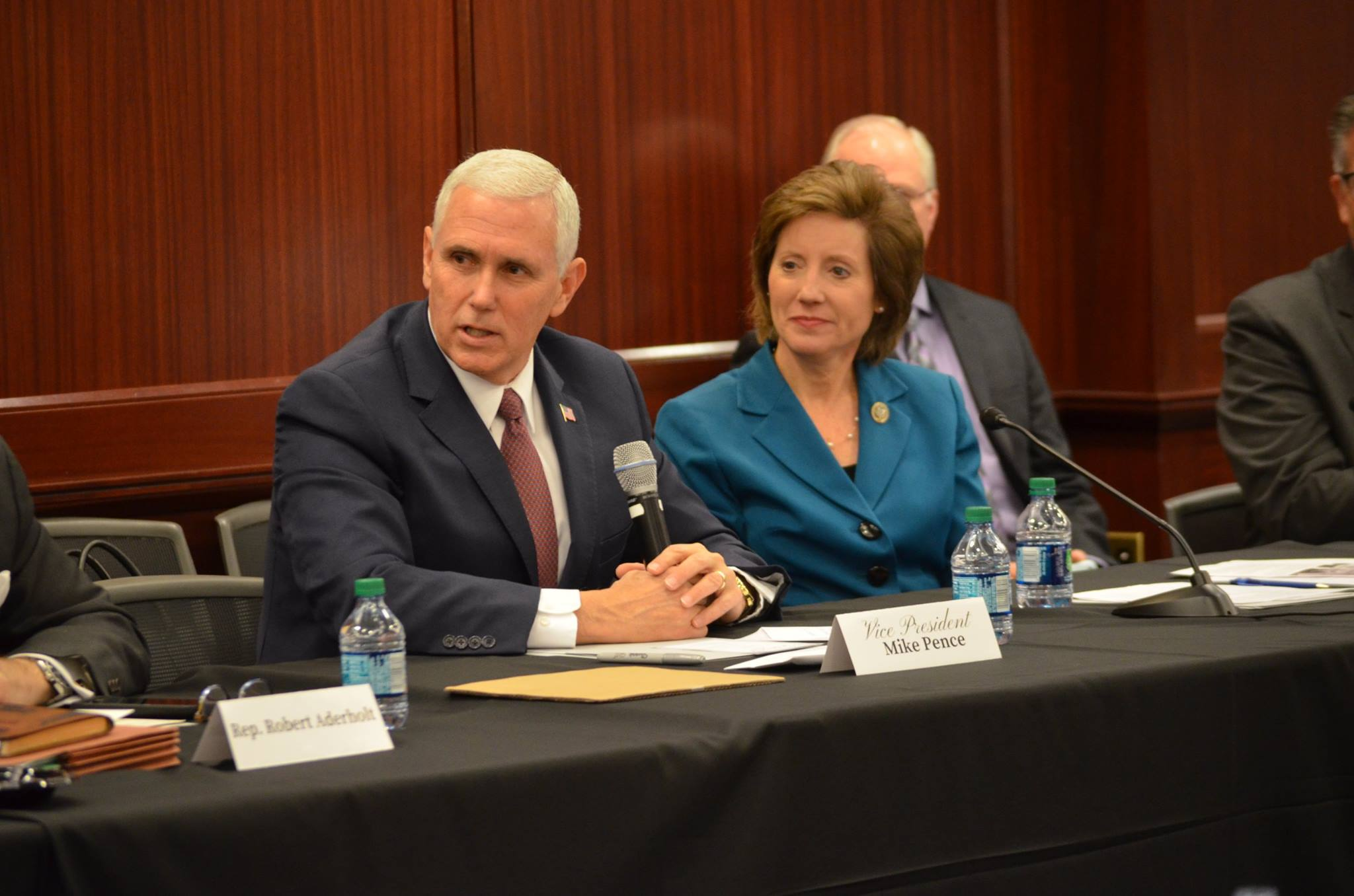
Hartzler with Vice President Mike Pence at a Value Action Team event in the United States House of Representatives.

=== Caucus memberships ===
- Republican Study Committee
- Congressional Cement Caucus
- Congressional Taiwan Caucus
- Veterinary Medicine Caucus
- United States Congressional International Conservation Caucus

== Tenure and political positions ==
=== Abortion ===
Hartzler opposes abortion. She has sponsored legislation in an effort to block taxpayer dollars from funding clinics that offer abortion services, such as Planned Parenthood, as well as legislation such as the Pain-Capable Unborn Child Protection Act.

In October 2015, Hartzler was on the Select Investigative Panel on Planned Parenthood.

=== Agriculture ===
In September 2013, Hartzler voted for a $39 billion reduction in Supplemental Nutrition Assistance Program benefits, which was separated from legislation to increase farm subsidies for the first time in over three decades.

As a senior member of the House Agriculture Committee, Hartzler served as a conferee to pass the final version of the Farm Bill in 2018. Hartzler did not vote on the measure to pass the Farm Bill due to her father dying in December 2018. President Donald Trump signed the final version of the Farm Bill in December 2018.

Hartzler has supported investment in rural broadband, which falls under the jurisdiction of the House Agriculture Committee. She successfully led provisions Trump signed into law to increase private investment in rural broadband, modifying Rural Utilities Service broadband programs to include loan guarantees in addition to existing direct loans. She also successfully led provisions to increase minimum download speeds from 4 to 25 megabits per second, with minimum upload speed tripling to 3 Mbit/s for companies receiving financing from the Department of Agriculture's Rural Utilities Service fund. In 2020, Hartzler introduced legislation to allow certain Rural Utilities Service borrowers to take advantage of low interest rates without heavy fines and penalties in the aftermath of the COVID-19 pandemic.

=== Environment ===
Hartzler rejects the scientific consensus on climate change. On November 18, 2014, during the worst early season cold snap in the U.S. since 1976, Hartzler made a joke about climate change on Twitter. "Global warming strikes America! Brrrr!" The quip was rebutted in detail by The Washington Post, which reported that her district in Missouri is among the areas most severely impacted by climate change in the United States.

=== China ===
Hartzler supported the Trump administration's call to require the government to purchase only medical equipment and pharmaceuticals made in the United States. In 2019, she and Representative John Garamendi introduced legislation to require the Department of Defense to "identify vulnerabilities faced by our country's dependence on Chinese pharmaceuticals, and to only purchase American-made raw materials, medicines, and vaccines for the military." In July 2020, Hartzler and Garamendi announced provisions of the legislation were ultimately rolled in the broader National Defense Authorization Act, which passed the House of Representatives on July 21, 2020.

As a member of the Congressional-Executive Commission on China, Hartzler was sanctioned by the Chinese government along with other prominent members of the federal government, including Senator Marco Rubio, Senator Ted Cruz, and Secretary of State Mike Pompeo. The sanctions against Hartzler and her colleagues came after Pompeo and the United States Department of Treasury sanctioned four Chinese officials for their involvement in human rights abuses against the Uyghurs.

On July 17, 2020, days after the announcement of sanctions against U.S. lawmakers by China, Hartzler wrote a Fox News op-ed expressing support for the Trump administration's sanctions on China and calling for the international community to impose similar sanctions. She also called on lawmakers to "expose U.S. companies complicit" in profiting from alleged slave labor in Xinjiang re-education camps.

=== Healthcare ===
Hartzler opposed the Affordable Care Act and supported the American Health Care Act.

=== Immigration ===
In January 2017, Hartzler made a statement supporting Trump's ban on immigrants from seven Muslim countries and halting the U.S. Refugee program for 120 days. In her statement, Hartzler said Trump's executive order and Obama's 2011 policy that slowed immigration from Iraq were "similar".

=== LGBT rights ===
Hartzler opposes same-sex marriage, civil unions, and domestic partnerships. She also opposes banning discrimination based on sexual orientation and gender identity. In 2019, Hartzler expressed her strong opposition to the Equality Act. She has written an op-ed rejecting it. She also opposes allowing transgender individuals to serve in the military.

In 2019, Hartzler sponsored an event by proponents of conversion therapy in order to provide congressional office space, for which she was rebuked by Representative Ted Lieu, whose office was next to the event, and who sponsored legislation to ban conversion therapy.

In March 2022, Hartzler's Twitter account was briefly suspended after tweeting, "Women's sports are for women, not men pretending to be women", in reference to transgender swimmer Lia Thomas.

On December 8, 2022, Hartzler broke into tears as she called on her colleagues in the U.S. House of Representatives to oppose the Respect for Marriage Act, which would protect the legal status of same-sex and interracial marriage.

=== Military ===
Throughout her tenure in the committee, Hartzler has served as a conferee in the legislative process to pass the National Defense Authorization Act, all of which the president has signed into law. She has led initiatives to fully fund the B-21 long range strike bomber program and modernization programs of the Northrop Grumman B-2 Spirit based at Whiteman Air Force Base. She has also successfully advocated for funding for the maintenance and modifications to the A-10 Thunderbolt II program and funding for the F-15EX program based in Missouri, the F-18 Super Hornet program, and the T-7A Advanced Trainer program. Hartzler has also successfully advocated for funding of the Fort Leonard Wood hospital replacement project and a partial dislocation allowance for service members forced to move from dormitories.

On June 29, 2017, Hartzler opposed allowing transgender Americans to serve in the U.S. armed forces, and proposed an amendment to the National Defense Authorization Act for Fiscal Year 2018 to reverse an Obama administration policy that allowed transgender Americans in the armed services. Her amendment was rejected in a 209–214 vote, but Trump subsequently announced that he would ban transgender people to serve in U.S. military; Hartzler said that she was "very pleased" by the decision.

=== Violence Against Women Act ===
Hartzler voted against the reauthorization of the Violence Against Women Act.

=== Economy ===
Hartzler, along with all other Senate and House Republicans, voted against the American Rescue Plan Act of 2021.

=== Paycheck Protection Program loan ===
During the COVID-19 pandemic, Hartzler's business, Heartland Tractor Company in Harrisonville, Missouri, received a loan of over $450,000 as part of the Paycheck Protection Program (PPP); the loan was later forgiven. Hartzler voted against the TRUTH Act (H.R. 6782), a bill that would have required public disclosure of companies that received funds through the program.

=== 2020 presidential election ===
On December 10, 2020, Hartzler was one of 126 Republican members of the U.S. House of Representatives to sign an amicus brief in support of Texas v. Pennsylvania, a lawsuit filed at the United States Supreme Court contesting the results of the 2020 presidential election. The Supreme Court declined to hear the case on the basis that Texas lacked standing under Article III of the Constitution to challenge the results of an election held by another state. House Speaker Nancy Pelosi issued a statement that called signing the amicus brief an act of election subversion.

Hartzler was one of the 139 Republican representatives who voted against certifying the results of the 2020 presidential election in Congress at the 2021 United States Electoral College vote count.

She was rated F by Republican Accountability in the organization's Democracy Report Card.

== 2022 U.S. Senate campaign ==
On June 10, 2021, Hartzler announced her candidacy for the open U.S. Senate seat in Missouri in 2022.

In February 2022, Hartzler's campaign released a 30-second ad criticizing Lia Thomas, a transgender swimmer on the University of Pennsylvania women's team. In the ad, Hartzler said, "Women's sports are for women, not men pretending to be women", adding that, as Missouri's senator, she would not "look away while woke liberals destroy women's sports."

U.S. Senator Josh Hawley endorsed Hartzler in February 2022. According to Politico, "His choice generated hard feelings among other contenders for the Senate nomination—in addition to raising eyebrows in Trump World. Of all the candidates in the field, Hartzler has done the least public pandering to win the former president's support." On July 8, 2022, Donald Trump refused to endorse Hartzler, saying, "I don't think she has what it takes to take on the Radical Left Democrats."

Hartzler lost the August 2 Republican primary to Missouri Attorney General Eric Schmitt, receiving 22% of the vote to Schmitt's 46%.

== Post-congressional career ==
=== Chair of the U.S. Commission on International Religious Freedom ===
On June 9, 2025, The United States Commission on International Religious Freedom (USCIRF) elected Vicky Hartzler as its Chair for 2025–2026. Hartzler was appointed to USCIRF by Speaker of the United States House of Representatives Mike Johnson (R-LA) in 2024. Her term expired in May 2026.

== Personal life ==
Hartzler lives on a farm near Harrisonville with her family. She is an Evangelical Christian. She co-owns the Hartzler Equipment Company, later renamed Heartland Tractor, and Hartzler Farms Inc. with her husband and other members of the Hartzler family.

== Works ==
- Hartzler self-published the book Running God's Way, Pleasant Word (a division of the now defunct WinePress Publishing; December 13, 2007), and then later Xulon Press; ISBN 978-1-4141-1124-7

== See also ==
- Women in the United States House of Representatives

U.S. House of Representatives
Preceded by Ike Skelton	Member of the U.S. House of Representatives from Missouri's 4th congressional district 2011–2023	Succeeded by Mark Alford
U.S. order of precedence (ceremonial)
Preceded by Kenny Hulshof as Former U.S. Representative	Order of precedence of the United States as Former U.S. Representative	Succeeded by Billy Long as Former U.S. Representative
