= Missouri's 31st Senate district =

American legislative district

Missouri's 31st State Senate district
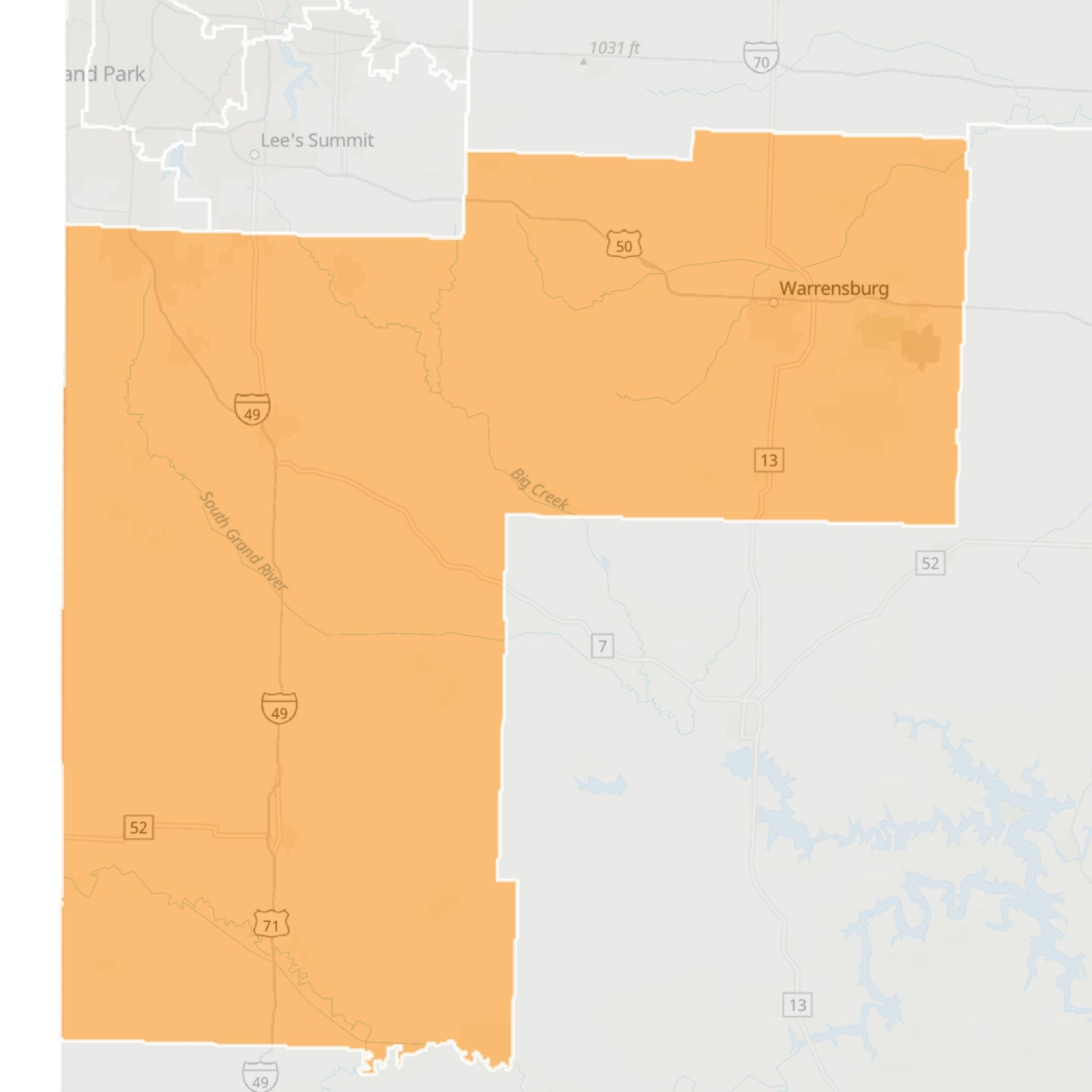
Senator
| Rick Brattin; R–Lee's Summit |
- Demographics: 85% White; 4% Black; 5% Hispanic; 1% Asian; 1% Other; 5% Multiracial
- Population (2023): 179,845

Missouri's 31st Senatorial District is one of 34 districts in the Missouri Senate. The district has been represented by Republican Rick Brattin since 2021.

== Geography ==
The district is based in west-central Missouri and includes all of Bates, Cass, and Johnson counties. Major municipalities in the district include Belton, Harrisonville, Raymore, and Warrensburg. The district is also home to Knob Noster State Park, Powell Gardens, and the University of Central Missouri.

== Election results (1996–2024) ==
=== 1996 ===
Missouri's 31st Senatorial District election (1996)
| Party | Candidate | Votes | % |
|---|---|---|---|
| Democratic | Harold L. Caskey | 38,821 | 61.4 |
| Republican | Harold G. Well | 24,416 | 38.6 |
| Total votes | | 63,237 | 100.0 |

=== 2000 ===
Missouri's 31st Senatorial District election (2000)
| Party | Candidate | Votes | % |
|---|---|---|---|
| Democratic | Harold L. Caskey (incumbent) | 38,697 | 52.2 |
| Republican | Jim Howerton | 35,443 | 47.8 |
| Total votes | | 74,140 | 100.0 |
| Democratic hold | | | |

=== 2004 ===
Missouri's 31st Senatorial District election (2004)
| Party | Candidate | Votes | % |
|---|---|---|---|
| Republican | Chris Koster | 50,328 | 62.9 |
| Democratic | Larry Snider | 28,565 | 35.7 |
| Libertarian | Len Ludlam | 1,086 | 1.4 |
| Total votes | | 79,979 | 100.0 |
| Republican gain from Democratic | | | |

=== 2008 ===
Missouri's 31st Senatorial District election (2008)
| Party | Candidate | Votes | % |
|---|---|---|---|
| Republican | David Pearce | 49,059 | 57.2 |
| Democratic | Chris Benjamin | 36,658 | 42.8 |
| Total votes | | 85,717 | 100.0 |
| Republican hold | | | |

=== 2012 ===
Missouri's 31st Senatorial District election (2012)
| Party | Candidate | Votes | % |
|---|---|---|---|
| Republican | Ed Emery | 49,993 | 63.8 |
| Democratic | Charles A. Burton | 28,375 | 36.2 |
| Total votes | | 78,368 | 100.0 |
| Republican hold | | | |

=== 2016 ===
Missouri's 31st Senatorial District election (2016)
| Party | Candidate | Votes | % |
|---|---|---|---|
| Republican | Ed Emery (incumbent) | 57,296 | 72.4 |
| Independent | Tim Wells | 11,798 | 14.9 |
| Libertarian | Lora Young | 10,007 | 12.7 |
| Total votes | | 79,101 | 100.0 |
| Republican hold | | | |

=== 2020 ===
Missouri's 31st Senatorial District election (2020)
| Party | Candidate | Votes | % |
|---|---|---|---|
| Republican | Rick Brattin | 63,929 | 71.4 |
| Democratic | Raymond Kinney | 25,584 | 28.6 |
| Total votes | | 89,513 | 100.0 |
| Republican hold | | | |

=== 2024 ===
Missouri's 31st Senatorial District election (2024)
| Party | Candidate | Votes | % |
|---|---|---|---|
| Republican | Rick Brattin (incumbent) | 60,541 | 68.51 |
| Democratic | Raymond L. James | 27,825 | 31.49 |
| Total votes | | 88,366 | 100.00 |
| Republican hold | | | |

== Statewide election results ==
| Year | Office | Results |
|---|---|---|
| 2008 | President | McCain 57.7 – 40.3% |
| 2012 | President | Romney 64.2 – 35.8% |
| 2016 | President | Trump 66.0 – 28.0% |
| 2016 | Senate | Blunt 54.7 – 39.8% |
| 2016 | Governor | Greitens 56.6 – 40.0% |
| 2018 | Senate | Hawley 59.8 – 36.2% |
| 2020 | President | Trump 66.7 – 31.1% |
| 2020 | Governor | Parson 66.4 – 31.0% |
