= Chris Stigall =

American radio talk show host (born 1977)

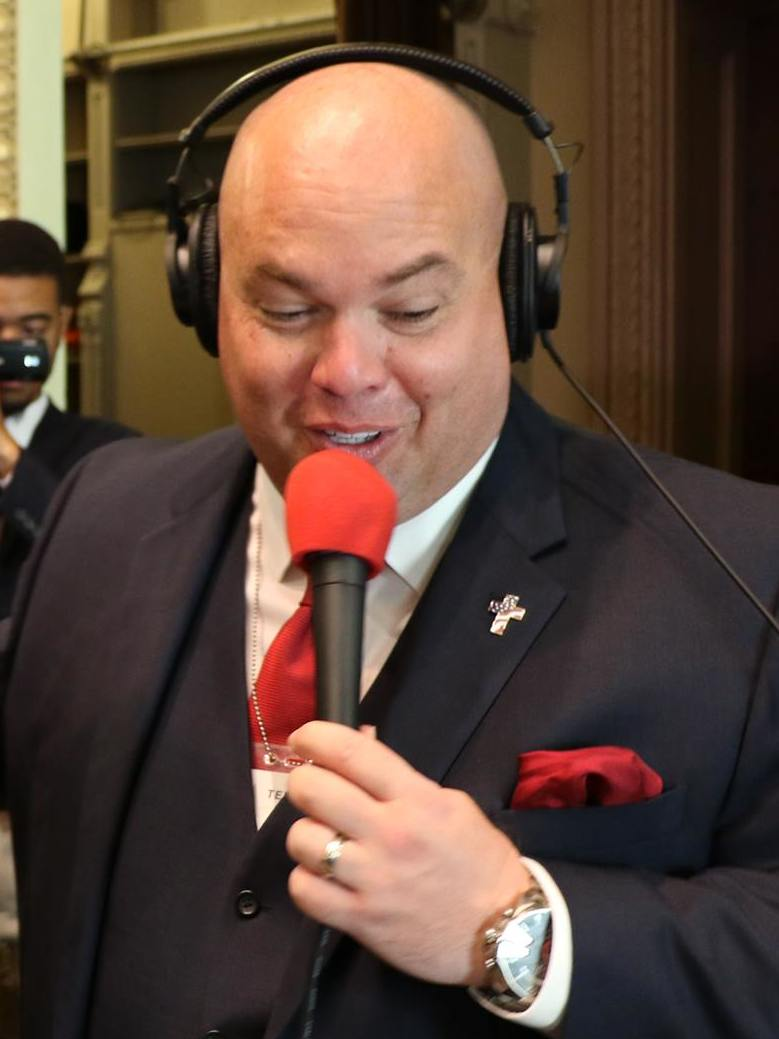
- Stigall in 2017

Member-elect of the U.S. House of Representatives from Missouri's 6th district
- Assuming office January 3, 2027
- Succeeding: Sam Graves

Personal details
- Born: Christopher Steven Stigall; January 5, 1977 (age 49) Richmond, Missouri, U.S.
- Party: Republican
- Education: Northwest Missouri State University (BA)
- Website: Campaign website

Christopher Steven Stigall (born January 5, 1977) is an American politician, conservative talk radio personality, cable news contributor, online columnist and host of The Chris Stigall podcast. He currently hosts the morning show on Salem Media Group's AM 990 The Answer in Philadelphia, and was the prior host of WPHT Morning Show in the Delaware Valley market from 2011 to March 2019. Previously, he hosted The KCMO (AM) Morning Show in the Kansas City market from 2006 until 2010.

Stigall launched a nationally-syndicated show on the Salem Radio Network in January 2025, hosting the morning show from 6 to 9 AM EST. He replaced Hugh Hewitt, whose show moved to the 3 to 6 PM slot in order to replace Sebastian Gorka, who left Salem to join the second Trump administration.

Stigall was the Republican nominee for Missouri's 6th congressional district in 2026, where he won. He gave up his nationally-syndicated talk show to seek public service in the U.S. House of Representatives, as have others from the Salem Radio Network.

== Education and early career ==
Stigall graduated from Northwest Missouri State University, where he studied comedy writing and television production as an intern with the Late Show with David Letterman in New York. Stigall also served as a representative and press assistant to U.S. Representative Sam Graves, and later went on to work in Kansas City radio in 1999.

== Career ==
Stigall interviewing Vice President Mike Pence in 2017.

In 2009, Stigall was selected as the master of ceremonies at the Mayor's Christmas Tree lighting ceremony.

On November 18, 2010, WPHT in Philadelphia announced that Stigall will be anchoring its morning show focused on "local and national policy, the economy, the biggest news stories and issues that affect all Philadelphians, coupled with interviews of the day's news and decision makers."

On March 6, 2019, Stigall and WPHT ended their broadcast partnership after 8-plus years, according to insiders the "split wasn't unpleasant." Stigall went on to launch a podcast version of his previous radio show featuring his former co-host Paige Powers.

Stigall has filled in for nationally-syndicated hosts Michael Savage, Rusty Humphries, Lou Dobbs, Fred Thompson, Jerry Doyle, Steve Malzberg, and Sebastian Gorka. He has also been a contributor for Salem-owned outlets Townhall and Human Events, as well as Andrew Breitbart's BigHollywood, Philadelphia, The American Spectator, and the Platte County Landmark.

== Sharyl Attkisson revelation ==
On May 25, 2013, Stigall conducted an interview with Sharyl Attkisson and inquired about if she suspected her computer of being hacked as a part of the 2013 Department of Justice investigations of reporters. Attkisson responded that her personal and work computers had been compromised and were under investigation. She responded, "I think there could be some relationship between these types of things and what happened to me," adding that "something suspicious had been happening since." Stigall then had a media clash with Erik Wemple from The Washington Post. Prior to the release of Attkisson's book, Wemple had criticized her for "ladling out hints and half-assertions about the violations of her computers, as she was apparently holding back details that could assist the public in determining just who was responsible for them." Her 2014 book Stonewalled chronicled her on-air exchange with Stigall and revealed that it was an unexpected encounter for her that became a national news story.

== Political career ==
=== 2026 Congressional campaign ===
On March 27, 2026, Stigall joined five Republicans running to replace retiring U.S. Representative Sam Graves in Missouri's 6th congressional district.

Endorsed in the race by Graves, he won the five-way Republican primary on August 4, 2026 with 44% of the vote, beating second-place finisher, Kansas City Council member Nathan Willett, by 12 percentage points. Stigall outlines his plans for winning the general election in November thusly:

The 6th District is a huge, huge district with 33 counties. Our biggest task as we close out this race heading into November is to get to as many of those counties as often as possible. We need to meet folks where they are and hear the various concerns that they have. It's a lot of rural counties that all have very unique needs. Many are similar, but with a lot of land to cover, with a lot of people to represent.

Stigall strongly supports reducing Federal government spending, saying this must be a priority for Congress. "I wouldn't mind seeing a balanced budget amendment," he says. On the military actions in Iran, Stigall says: "So doing the right thing and leading is a very difficult thing to do. But this is a 50-year plague, not just in that region, but to the world that the president decided to deal with despite the politics of it."

Stigall beat his Democrat opponent, Josh Smead, 58% to 39% (as of 10:30 pm) to take the seat.

== Charity work ==
Through a partnership with the Pennsylvania SPCA and the Piazza Auto Group, Stigall has helped find homes for over 100 shelter animals through his weekly on-air segment "The Piazza Pet of the Week."

Philadelphia's USO chapter known as Liberty USO has partnered with Stigall and the Philadelphia Phillies to surprise military service members annually with a trip to Phillies Fantasy Camp in Clearwater, Florida.

== Controversy ==
In March 2011, Stigall became heavily involved in the Delaware County priest trial. Stigall thought The Philadelphia Inquirer was heavily biased in its coverage and one priest and his lawyer declared their innocence on Stigall's morning talk show.

U.S. House of Representatives
Preceded by Sam Graves	Member of the U.S. House of Representatives from Missouri's 6th congressional district Taking office 2027	Elect
