= Ensuring Patient Access and Effective Drug Enforcement Act =

United States federal statute

- Enacted by: the 114th United States Congress

Citations
- Public law: Pub. L. 114–145 (text) (PDF)

Legislative history
- Introduced in the Senate as the "Enduring Patient Access and Effective Drug Enforcement Act of 2015" (S. 483) by Orrin Hatch (R–UT) on February 12, 2015; Committee consideration by Senate Judiciary Committee; Passed the Senate on March 17, 2016; Passed the House on April 12, 2016; Signed into law by President Barack Obama on April 19, 2016

The Ensuring Patient Access and Effective Drug Enforcement Act of 2016 is a United States federal statute enacted by the 114th United States Congress and signed into law by President Barack Obama on April 19, 2016. It modified the Controlled Substances Act, which requires the Drug Enforcement Administration (DEA) to identify "imminent danger to the public health and safety" before suspending the registration of a manufacturer, distributor, or dispenser for controlled substances privileges.

It "hampered the DEA's ability to seize suspicious shipments [of opioids]" within the context of the opioid epidemic.

It was cosponsored by Sen. Sheldon Whitehouse [D-RI], Sen. Marco Rubio [R-FL], Sen. David Vitter [R-LA], Rep. Marsha Blackburn and Sen. Bill Cassidy [R-LA].

An earlier iteration of the bill was introduced by Rep. Tom Marino [R-PA] and passed the House of Representatives in 2015. This was purportedly the reason behind Marino's withdrawal of his candidacy for Director of the Office of National Drug Control Policy (a.k.a. drug czar).

It has been reported on by various news agencies including the Washington Post, Fox News, USA Today, and the story was originally broken by CBS/60 Minutes.
