= Harold Caskey =

American politician

Member of the Missouri Senate from the 31st district
- In office January 5, 1977 – January 5, 2005
- Preceded by: William J. Cason
- Succeeded by: Chris Koster

Personal details
- Born: January 3, 1938 Hume, Missouri
- Died: October 1, 2015 (aged 77) Merriam, Kansas
- Party: Democratic

Harold Caskey (January 3, 1938 – October 1, 2015) was an American politician who served in the Missouri Senate from the 31st district from 1977 to 2005. Caskey was legally blind since the first grade due to Infantile Macular Scarring which left him unable to drive or read. Caskey graduated from Central Missouri State College and the University of Missouri School of Law.

He died of Parkinson's disease on October 1, 2015, in Merriam, Kansas at age 77.
