= Therapeutic Fraud Prevention Act =

Bill in the United States Congress from 2015

- Long title: To prohibit, as an unfair and deceptive act or practice, commercial sexual orientation conversion therapy, and for other purposes.
- Announced in: the 114th United States Congress
- Sponsored by: Rep. Ted Lieu

Legislative history
- Introduced in the House as H.R. 2450 by Rep. Ted Lieu on May 19, 2015; Committee consideration by United States House Committee on Energy and Commerce United States House Energy Subcommittee on Commerce, Manufacturing and Trade

The Therapeutic Fraud Prevention Act is a bill in the United States House of Representatives that if passed would prohibit, as an unfair and deceptive act or practice, commercial sexual orientation and gender identity conversion therapy, and for other purposes.

Through classifying for-profit conversion therapy as an unfair or deceptive act or practice, ergo consumer fraud, the bill would open violators up to prosecution by the Federal Trade Commission as well as civil lawsuits. Federal prosecutor Faraz Mohammadi notes that federal mail and wire fraud statutes are the most powerful statutes used by federal prosecutors; further, the criminal intent of conversion therapy providers to defraud patients has been found by juries when presented with the medical community's wide-ranging agreement on conversion therapy's ineffectiveness and harms, such as in Ferguson v. JONAH.

== Introduced bills ==
=== 114th Congress ===
On May 19, 2015, Rep. Ted Lieu (D-CA), who had authored the first such ban in California while State Senator in 2012, introduced the Therapeutic Fraud Prevention Act (H.R. 2450) in the U.S. House of Representatives. The bill had 96 cosponsors.

On April 28, 2016, Sen. Patty Murray (D-WA) introduced a companion bill (S. 2880) in the U.S. Senate, where it had 21 cosponsors.

=== 115th Congress ===
On April 25, 2017, Rep. Ted Lieu reintroduced the Therapeutic Fraud Prevention Act (H.R. 2119) in the House of Representatives, and Sen. Patty Murray reintroduced it (S. 928) in the Senate. The House bill had 110 cosponsors and the Senate counterpart had 25 cosponsors.

=== 116th Congress ===
On March 28, 2019, Rep. Sean Patrick Maloney (D-NY) introduced the Prohibition of Medicaid Funding for Conversion Therapy Act (H.R. 1981) in the House of Representatives with 83 cosponsors.

On June 27, 2019, Rep. Ted Lieu reintroduced the Therapeutic Fraud Prevention Act (H.R. 3570) in the House of Representatives, and Sen. Patty Murray reintroduced it (S. 2008) in the Senate. The House bill had 219 cosponsors and the Senate counterpart had 43 cosponsors.

=== 117th Congress ===
On June 24, 2021, Rep. Ted Lieu reintroduced the Therapeutic Fraud Prevention Act (H.R. 4146) in the House of Representatives, and Sen. Patty Murray reintroduced it (S. 2242) in the Senate. The House bill has 89 cosponsors and the Senate counterpart has 33 cosponsors.

== Support ==
The Human Rights Campaign has endorsed the Therapeutic Fraud Prevention Act.

In a 2015 statement supporting the bill, then-President of the American Academy of Pediatrics Sandra Hassink MD wrote “Homophobia and heterosexism inherent in conversion therapy can contribute to health disparities as marginalization negatively affects the health, mental health, and education of those who experience it. Struggles with self-image and self-esteem result in significant health disparities for sexual minority youth related to depression and suicidality, substance abuse, social anxiety, altered body image, and other mental health issues.”

== Opposition ==
Legal scholarship has questioned the scope of the bill as it pertains to medical autonomy of adults as well as the feasibility of a nationwide ban.

As of 2024, no Republicans in the U.S. House of Representatives or the U.S. Senate have co-sponsored the bill.

== See also ==
- List of U.S. jurisdictions banning conversion therapy
