= 2024 Missouri Secretary of State election =

- November 5, 2024
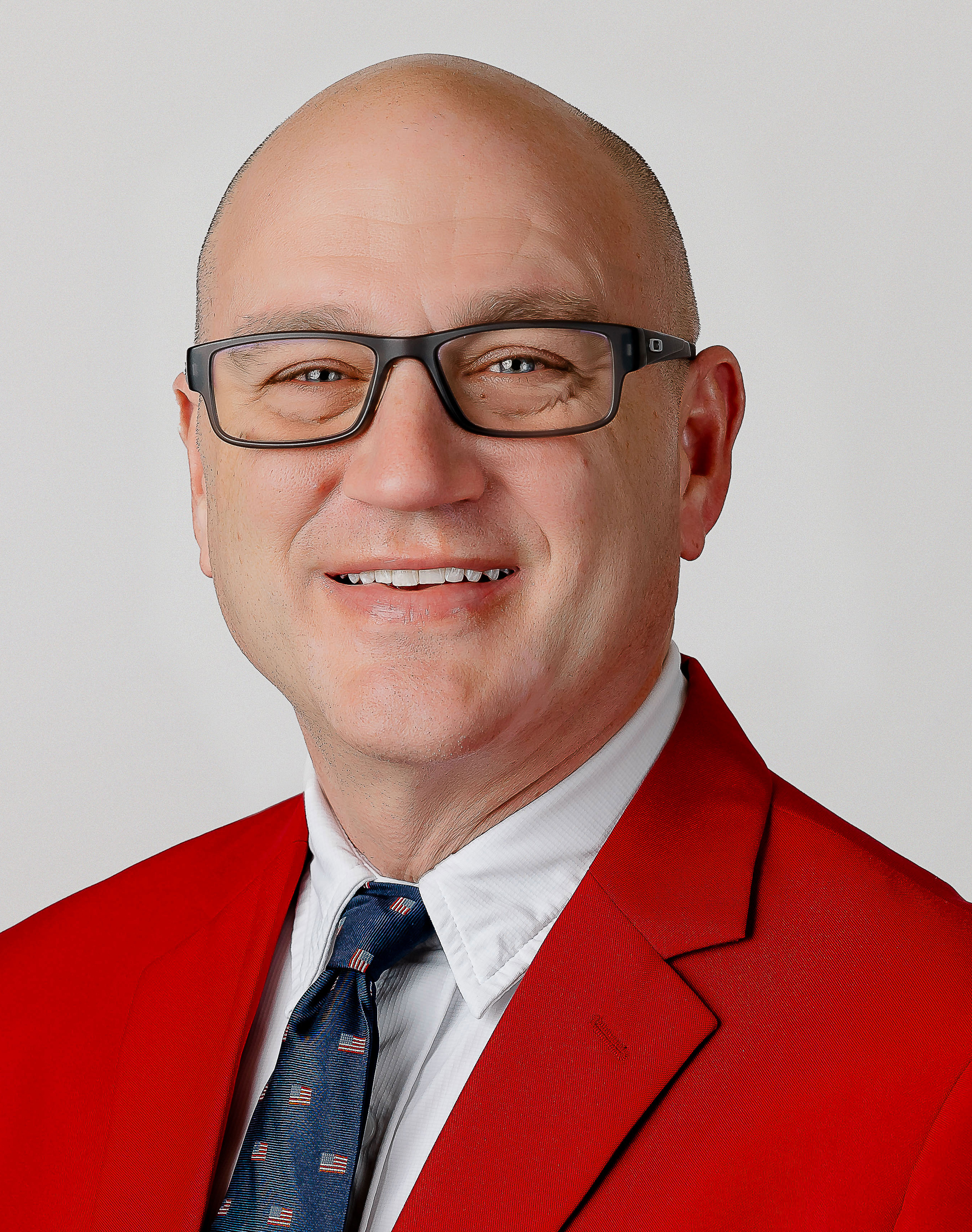

Nominee	Denny Hoskins	Barbara Phifer
Party	Republican	Democratic
Popular vote	1,677,902	1,154,090
Percentage	57.66%	39.66%
- Hoskins: 40–50% 50–60% 60–70% 70–80% 80–90% >90% Phifer: 40–50% 50–60% 60–70% 70–80% 80–90% >90% Tie: 40–50% 50% No votes
Secretary of State before election
Jay Ashcroft
Republican
Elected Secretary of State
Denny Hoskins
Republican

The 2024 Missouri Secretary of State election was held on November 5, 2024, to elect the secretary of state of the state of Missouri. It coincided with the concurrent presidential election, as well as various state and local elections, including for U.S. Senate, U.S. House, and governor of Missouri. The primaries took place on August 6, 2024.

Republican nominee, Denny Hoskins won the election and became the secretary of state in 2025.

== Republican primary ==
=== Candidates ===
==== Nominee ====
- Denny Hoskins, state senator from the 21st district (2017–present)

==== Eliminated in primary ====
- Mike Carter, attorney and former municipal judge
- Mary Elizabeth Coleman, state senator from the 22nd district (2023–present)
- Jamie Corley, communications professional and former press secretary for U.S. Senator Bob Corker
- Valentina Gomez, financial strategist
- Dean Plocher, Speaker of the Missouri House of Representatives
- Shane Schoeller, Greene County Clerk (2015–present), former state representative from the 139th district (2007–2013), and nominee for secretary of state in 2012
- Adam Schwadron, state representative from the 106th district (2021–present)

==== Withdrawn ====
- Caleb Rowden, President pro tempore of the Missouri Senate (2023–present) from the 19th district (2017–present)

==== Declined ====
- Jay Ashcroft, incumbent secretary of state (2017–present) (ran for governor)

==== Endorsements ====
Mary Elizabeth Coleman

Organizations

- Susan B. Anthony Pro-Life America
Denny Hoskins

Organizations

- Missouri Right to Life PAC
Shane Schoeller

Newspapers

- St. Louis Post-Dispatch (primary only)

=== Fundraising ===
Campaign finance reports as of July 16, 2024
Candidate	Raised
Jamie Corley (R)	$286,000
Valentina Gomez (R)	$24,000
Denny Hoskins (R)	$225,000
Dean Plocher (R)	$508,000
Shane Schoeller (R)	$210,000
Adam Schwadron (R)	$119,000
Source: Missouri Independent

=== Polling ===
Poll source	Date(s) administered	Sample size (Note: Key: A – all adults RV – registered voters LV – likely voters V – unclear)	Margin of error	Mike Carter	Mary Elizabeth Coleman	Jamie Corley	Valentina Gomez	Denny Hoskins	Dean Plocher	Caleb Rowden	Shane Schoeller	Adam Schwadron	Undecided
Battleground Connect (Note: Poll commissioned by the Missouri Scout)	July 30–31, 2024	896 (LV)	± 3.1%	7%	9%	5%	9%	13%	6%	–	11%	3%	37%
Remington Research (R)	July 22–24, 2024	864 (LV)	± 3.3%	8%	9%	5%	7%	11%	5%	–	11%	2%	42%
Remington Research (R)	June 11–13, 2024	578 (LV)	± 4.0%	6%	10%	4%	6%	6%	2%	–	10%	2%	55%
Remington Research (R)	March 27–29, 2024	527 (LV)	± 4.0%	6%	11%	3%	5%	10%	2%	–	7%	3%	53%
	March 18, 2024	Caleb Rowden withdraws from the race											
Remington Research (R)	February 14–15, 2024	706 (LV)	± 3.6%	–	–	–	10%	12%	–	11%	6%	5%	56%
Remington Research (R)	January 17–18, 2024	806 (LV)	± 3.3%	–	–	–	7%	12%	–	11%	6%	5%	59%
Remington Research (R)	September 27–28, 2023	714 (LV)	± 3.4%	–	–	–	–	15%	–	9%	9%	–	67%
Remington Research (R)	July 5–7, 2023	706 (LV)	± 3.4%	–	–	–	–	15%	–	7%	12%	–	66%
Remington Research (R)	April 11–12, 2023	778 (LV)	± 3.4%	–	–	–	–	14%	–	13%	10%	–	63%
Remington Research (R)	February 8–9, 2023	820 (LV)	± 3.2%	–	–	–	–	–	–	6%	8%	–	86%

=== Results ===
Republican primary results
Party	Candidate	Votes	%
Republican	Denny Hoskins	157,116	24.42
Republican	Shane Schoeller	108,289	16.83
Republican	Mike Carter	91,866	14.28
Republican	Dean Plocher	86,659	13.47
Republican	Mary Elizabeth Coleman	72,938	11.34
Republican	Valentina Gomez	47,931	7.45
Republican	Jamie Corley	46,314	7.20
Republican	Adam Schwadron	32,335	5.03
Total votes		643,448	100.00

== Democratic primary ==
=== Candidates ===
==== Nominee ====
- Barbara Phifer, state representative from the 90th district (2021–present)

==== Eliminated in primary ====
- Haley Jacobson, grant writer
- Monique Williams, certified public accountant

==== Withdrawn ====
- Gavin Bena, president of Saint Louis University College Democrats
- Alan Gray, state representative

=== Polling ===
Hypothetical polling

Poll source	Date(s) administered	Sample size	Margin of error	Alan Gray	Peter Meredith	Undecided
Remington Research Group	July 12–13, 2023	661 (LV)	± 3.9%	21%	13%	66%

=== Results ===
Results by county Phifer: 30–40%; 40–50%; Williams: 30–40%; 40–50%; Jacobsen: 30–40%; 40–50%; 50–60%; Tie: 30–40%

Democratic primary results
Party	Candidate	Votes	%
Democratic	Barbara Phifer	146,284	40.86
Democratic	Monique Williams	123,270	34.43
Democratic	Haley Jacobsen	88,491	24.72
Total votes		358,045	100.00

== Third-party and independent candidates ==
=== Candidates ===
- Jerome Bauer (Green), university lecturer, perennial candidate, and nominee for governor in 2020
- Carl Freese (Libertarian), retired security guard and nominee for secretary of state in 2020

== General election ==
=== Predictions ===
Source	Ranking	As of
Sabato's Crystal Ball	Safe R	January 31, 2024

=== Polling ===
Poll source	Date(s) administered	Sample size	Margin of error	Denny Hoskins (R)	Barbara Phifer (D)	Other	Undecided
ActiVote	October 8–27, 2024	400 (LV)	± 4.9%	55%	45%	–	–
ActiVote	September 6 – October 13, 2024	400 (LV)	± 4.9%	56.5%	43.5%	–	–
YouGov/Saint Louis University	August 8–16, 2024	450 (LV)	± 5.4%	54%	36%	1%	9%

=== Results ===
2024 Missouri Secretary of State election
Party	Candidate	Votes	%	±%
Republican	Denny Hoskins	1,677,902	57.66%	−2.93%
Democratic	Barbara Phifer	1,154,090	39.66%	+3.38%
Libertarian	Carl Freese	49,113	1.69%	−0.18%
Green	Jerome Bauer	29,012	1.00%	+0.19%
Total votes		2,910,117	100.00%	N/A
Republican hold				

==== By county ====
County	Denny Hoskins Republican		Barbara Phifer Democratic		Various candidates Other parties		Margin		Total
County	#	%	#	%	#	%	#	%	Total
Adair	6,617	66.44%	3,099	31.11%	244	2.45%	3,518	35.32%	9,960
Andrew	6,870	72.54%	2,321	24.51%	279	2.95%	4,549	48.04%	9,470
Atchison	1,987	78.07%	480	18.86%	78	3.06%	1,507	59.21%	2,545
Audrain	7,096	70.15%	2,664	26.34%	355	3.51%	4,432	43.82%	10,115
Barry	12,485	79.73%	2,789	17.81%	386	2.46%	9,696	61.92%	15,660
Barton	4,897	84.17%	802	13.78%	119	2.05%	4,095	70.39%	5,818
Bates	6,147	76.89%	1,601	20.03%	247	3.09%	4,546	56.86%	7,995
Benton	7,972	76.24%	2,180	20.85%	305	2.92%	5,792	55.39%	10,457
Bollinger	5,032	84.08%	773	12.92%	180	3.01%	4,259	71.16%	5,985
Boone	38,440	44.33%	45,763	52.77%	2,519	2.90%	-7,323	-8.44%	86,722
Buchanan	21,458	61.96%	12,213	35.27%	959	2.77%	9,245	26.70%	34,630
Butler	14,013	80.35%	3,091	17.72%	335	1.92%	10,922	62.63%	17,439
Caldwell	3,518	77.15%	912	20.00%	130	2.85%	2,606	57.15%	4,560
Callaway	14,290	68.73%	5,824	28.01%	677	3.26%	8,466	40.72%	20,791
Camden	18,598	75.47%	5,458	22.15%	587	2.38%	13,140	53.32%	24,643
Cape Girardeau	27,739	71.20%	10,028	25.74%	1,194	3.06%	17,711	45.46%	38,961
Carroll	3,520	80.40%	757	17.29%	101	2.31%	2,763	63.11%	4,378
Carter	2,385	85.76%	356	12.80%	40	1.44%	2,029	72.96%	2,781
Cass	36,820	64.03%	19,053	33.13%	1,635	2.84%	17,767	30.89%	57,508
Cedar	5,590	80.85%	1,094	15.82%	230	3.33%	4,496	65.03%	6,914
Chariton	2,937	75.35%	853	21.88%	108	2.77%	2,084	53.46%	3,898
Christian	37,283	75.37%	11,020	22.28%	1,161	2.35%	26,263	53.10%	49,464
Clark	2,447	76.83%	616	19.34%	122	3.83%	1,831	57.49%	3,185
Clay	65,924	51.82%	58,033	45.61%	3,271	2.57%	7,891	6.20%	127,228
Clinton	7,681	70.86%	2,838	26.18%	320	2.95%	4,843	44.68%	10,839
Cole	25,688	65.93%	12,144	31.17%	1,132	2.91%	13,544	34.76%	38,964
Cooper	6,157	71.44%	2,224	25.80%	238	2.76%	3,933	45.63%	8,619
Crawford	8,318	78.87%	2,022	19.17%	206	1.95%	6,296	59.70%	10,546
Dade	3,303	81.13%	648	15.92%	120	2.95%	2,655	65.22%	4,071
Dallas	6,445	79.11%	1,445	17.74%	257	3.15%	5,000	61.37%	8,147
Daviess	2,915	76.73%	775	20.40%	109	2.87%	2,140	56.33%	3,799
DeKalb	3,555	76.85%	916	19.80%	155	3.35%	2,639	57.05%	4,626
Dent	5,643	82.24%	1,042	15.19%	177	2.58%	4,601	67.05%	6,862
Douglas	5,793	82.98%	991	14.20%	197	2.82%	4,802	68.79%	6,981
Dunklin	7,500	77.45%	1,904	19.66%	280	2.89%	5,596	57.79%	9,684
Franklin	37,470	70.15%	14,250	26.68%	1,696	3.18%	23,220	43.47%	53,416
Gasconade	6,133	79.25%	1,478	19.10%	128	1.65%	4,655	60.15%	7,739
Gentry	2,461	78.08%	608	19.29%	83	2.63%	1,853	58.79%	3,152
Greene	84,930	60.19%	52,648	37.31%	3,518	2.49%	32,282	22.88%	141,096
Grundy	3,514	81.49%	727	16.86%	71	1.65%	2,787	64.63%	4,312
Harrison	3,162	84.32%	543	14.48%	45	1.20%	2,619	69.84%	3,750
Henry	7,702	73.20%	2,495	23.71%	325	3.09%	5,207	49.49%	10,522
Hickory	3,833	77.12%	994	20.00%	143	2.88%	2,839	57.12%	4,970
Holt	1,820	81.11%	356	15.86%	68	3.03%	1,464	65.24%	2,244
Howard	3,317	69.25%	1,302	27.18%	171	3.57%	2,015	42.07%	4,790
Howell	14,998	81.63%	2,988	16.26%	387	2.11%	12,010	65.37%	18,373
Iron	3,229	75.22%	908	21.15%	156	3.63%	2,321	54.06%	4,293
Jackson	118,851	38.37%	181,117	58.48%	9,744	3.15%	-62,266	-20.10%	309,712
Jasper	38,384	72.84%	12,933	24.54%	1,376	2.61%	25,451	48.30%	52,693
Jefferson	74,517	65.02%	36,581	31.92%	3,510	3.06%	37,936	33.10%	114,608
Johnson	16,019	69.23%	6,484	28.02%	636	2.75%	9,535	41.21%	23,139
Knox	1,293	78.41%	301	18.25%	55	3.34%	992	60.16%	1,649
Laclede	13,746	81.71%	2,674	15.89%	403	2.40%	11,072	65.81%	16,823
Lafayette	12,395	73.27%	4,169	24.65%	352	2.08%	8,226	48.63%	16,916
Lawrence	14,152	79.46%	3,168	17.79%	490	2.75%	10,984	61.67%	17,810
Lewis	3,312	76.76%	862	19.98%	141	3.27%	2,450	56.78%	4,315
Lincoln	23,303	75.20%	6,812	21.98%	872	2.81%	16,491	53.22%	30,987
Linn	4,144	75.13%	1,219	22.10%	153	2.77%	2,925	53.03%	5,516
Livingston	5,256	78.98%	1,291	19.40%	108	1.62%	3,965	59.58%	6,655
Macon	6,085	79.67%	1,404	18.38%	149	1.95%	4,681	61.29%	7,638
Madison	4,366	78.62%	1,021	18.39%	166	2.99%	3,345	60.24%	5,553
Maries	3,830	82.28%	735	15.79%	90	1.93%	3,095	66.49%	4,655
Marion	9,363	73.47%	2,968	23.29%	413	3.24%	6,395	50.18%	12,744
McDonald	7,585	82.91%	1,370	14.98%	193	2.11%	6,215	67.94%	9,148
Mercer	1,486	86.10%	220	12.75%	20	1.16%	1,266	73.35%	1,726
Miller	10,049	80.65%	2,040	16.37%	371	2.98%	8,009	64.28%	12,460
Mississippi	3,083	73.13%	989	23.46%	144	3.42%	2,094	49.67%	4,216
Moniteau	5,554	79.31%	1,256	17.94%	193	2.76%	4,298	61.37%	7,003
Monroe	3,207	76.59%	872	20.83%	108	2.58%	2,335	55.77%	4,187
Montgomery	4,539	78.10%	1,129	19.43%	144	2.48%	3,410	58.67%	5,812
Morgan	7,150	76.73%	1,897	20.36%	271	2.91%	5,253	56.37%	9,318
New Madrid	4,803	73.80%	1,505	23.13%	200	3.07%	3,298	50.68%	6,508
Newton	22,520	78.69%	5,476	19.13%	622	2.17%	17,044	59.56%	28,618
Nodaway	6,701	70.88%	2,558	27.06%	195	2.06%	4,143	43.82%	9,454
Oregon	3,538	80.45%	726	16.51%	134	3.05%	2,812	63.94%	4,398
Osage	6,481	85.82%	955	12.65%	116	1.54%	5,526	73.17%	7,552
Ozark	3,813	83.38%	664	14.52%	96	2.10%	3,149	68.86%	4,573
Pemiscot	3,647	72.88%	1,284	25.66%	73	1.46%	2,363	47.22%	5,004
Perry	7,367	79.76%	1,628	17.62%	242	2.62%	5,739	62.13%	9,237
Pettis	13,495	72.99%	4,520	24.45%	473	2.56%	8,975	48.55%	18,488
Phelps	13,207	70.03%	5,145	27.28%	506	2.68%	8,062	42.75%	18,858
Pike	5,845	77.11%	1,601	21.12%	134	1.77%	4,244	55.99%	7,580
Platte	29,293	51.61%	26,153	46.07%	1,316	2.32%	3,140	5.53%	56,762
Polk	12,447	80.14%	2,740	17.64%	344	2.21%	9,707	62.50%	15,531
Pulaski	10,783	71.93%	3,663	24.44%	544	3.63%	7,120	47.50%	14,990
Putnam	1,889	82.60%	337	14.74%	61	2.67%	1,552	67.86%	2,287
Ralls	4,266	76.37%	1,172	20.98%	148	2.65%	3,094	55.39%	5,586
Randolph	7,751	72.51%	2,617	24.48%	321	3.00%	5,134	48.03%	10,689
Ray	7,960	70.76%	2,960	26.31%	329	2.92%	5,000	44.45%	11,249
Reynolds	2,271	79.46%	504	17.63%	83	2.90%	1,767	61.83%	2,858
Ripley	4,542	82.18%	818	14.80%	167	3.02%	3,724	67.38%	5,527
Saline	6,252	68.59%	2,609	28.62%	254	2.79%	3,643	39.97%	9,115
Schuyler	1,440	78.39%	335	18.24%	62	3.38%	1,105	60.15%	1,837
Scotland	1,439	79.24%	325	17.90%	52	2.86%	1,114	61.34%	1,816
Scott	13,072	77.30%	3,422	20.24%	416	2.46%	9,650	57.07%	16,910
Shannon	3,047	79.81%	652	17.08%	119	3.12%	2,395	62.73%	3,818
Shelby	2,482	79.65%	565	18.13%	69	2.21%	1,917	61.52%	3,116
St. Charles	124,907	57.31%	87,393	40.10%	5,647	2.59%	37,514	17.21%	217,947
St. Clair	3,886	79.00%	940	19.11%	93	1.89%	2,946	59.89%	4,919
St. Francois	19,772	72.54%	6,720	24.66%	764	2.80%	13,052	47.89%	27,256
St. Louis City	18,543	16.33%	91,495	80.57%	3,521	3.10%	-72,952	-64.24%	113,559
St. Louis County	188,851	38.33%	292,114	59.28%	11,769	2.39%	-103,263	-20.96%	492,734
Ste. Genevieve	6,361	69.05%	2,567	27.87%	284	3.08%	3,794	41.19%	9,212
Stoddard	10,957	83.37%	1,792	13.63%	394	3.00%	9,165	69.73%	13,143
Stone	14,745	79.31%	3,485	18.74%	362	1.95%	11,260	60.56%	18,592
Sullivan	1,942	81.43%	399	16.73%	44	1.84%	1,543	64.70%	2,385
Taney	20,127	77.70%	5,131	19.81%	647	2.50%	14,996	57.89%	25,905
Texas	9,295	82.62%	1,659	14.75%	296	2.63%	7,636	67.88%	11,250
Vernon	6,784	77.85%	1,736	19.92%	194	2.23%	5,048	57.93%	8,714
Warren	14,171	72.93%	4,760	24.50%	501	2.58%	9,411	48.43%	19,432
Washington	7,567	77.45%	1,870	19.14%	333	3.41%	5,697	58.31%	9,770
Wayne	4,605	82.29%	837	14.96%	154	2.75%	3,768	67.33%	5,596
Webster	15,232	79.02%	3,534	18.33%	510	2.65%	11,698	60.69%	19,276
Worth	841	79.41%	192	18.13%	26	2.46%	649	61.28%	1,059
Wright	7,664	86.87%	994	11.27%	164	1.86%	6,670	75.61%	8,822
Totals	1,677,902	57.66%	1,154,090	39.66%	78,125	2.68%	523,812	18.00%	2,910,117

==== By congressional district ====
Hoskins won six of eight congressional districts.

District	Hoskins	Phifer	Representative
1st	20%	77%	Cori Bush (118th Congress)
1st	20%	77%	Wesley Bell (119th Congress)
2nd	54%	44%	Ann Wagner
3rd	62%	36%	Blaine Luetkemeyer (118th Congress)
3rd	62%	36%	Bob Onder (119th Congress)
4th	69%	28%	Mark Alford
5th	37%	60%	Emanuel Cleaver
6th	68%	30%	Sam Graves
7th	70%	27%	Eric Burlison
8th	74%	23%	Jason Smith

== Notes ==
Partisan clients
