= Robin Smith =

Robin Smith may refer to:

- Robin Smith (bishop) (born 1936), bishop of Hertford, 1990–2001
- Robin Smith (chess player) (1952–2009), American chess player
- Robin Smith (climber) (1938–1962), British climber
- Robin Smith (comics) (born 1957), British comic book artist
- Robin Smith (cricketer) (1963–2025), South African-born England international cricketer
- Robin Smith (politician) (born 1963), member of the Tennessee House of Representatives
- Robin Smith (racing driver) (1943–2019), British racing driver
- Robin Smith (wrestler) (born 1964), American WWF performer
- Robin B. Smith (born 1955), South African wrestling manager and actor
- Robin Smith (reporter), St. Louis news anchor

== See also ==
- Robyn Smith (disambiguation)
