= Ed Emery (politician) =

American politician (1950–2021)

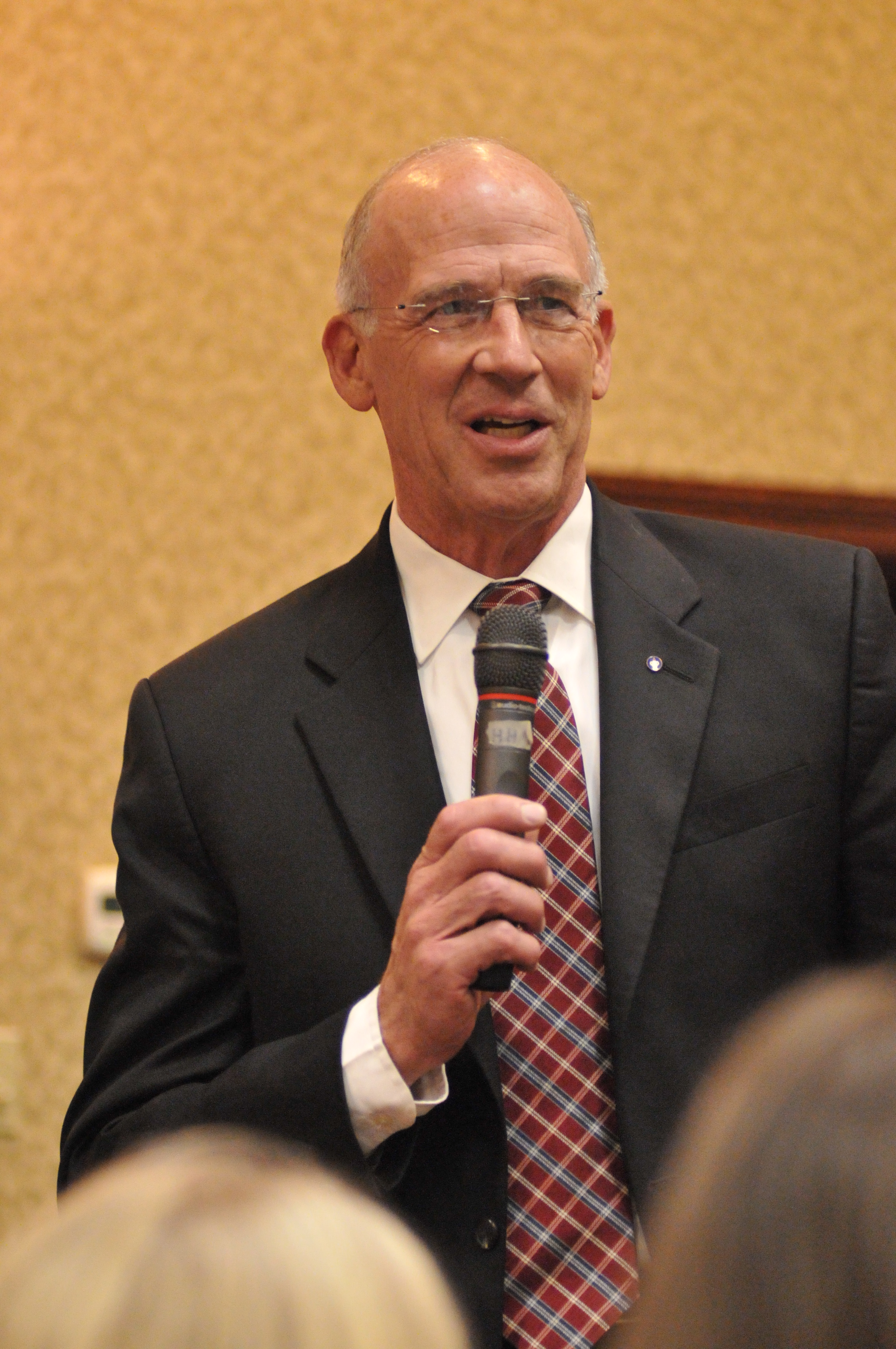

Member of the Missouri Senate from the 31st district
- In office January 9, 2013 – January 6, 2021
- Preceded by: David Pearce
- Succeeded by: Rick Brattin

Member of the Missouri House of Representatives from the 126th district
- In office January 2003 – January 5, 2011
- Succeeded by: Denny Hoskins

Personal details
- Born: May 25, 1950 Nevada, Missouri, U.S.
- Died: August 6, 2021 (aged 71) Columbia, Missouri, U.S.
- Party: Republican
- Spouse: Rebecca Emery
- Children: 4
- Education: Missouri University of Science and Technology (BS)

Edgar Glenn Harvey Emery (May 25, 1950 – August 6, 2021) was an American businessman, engineer, and politician who served as a member of the Missouri Senate, representing parts of southwestern Missouri.

== Early life and education ==
Emery was a native of Vernon County, Missouri, where his family was active in the feed and grain business. Emery earned a Bachelor of Science degree in engineering from the Missouri University of Science and Technology.

== Career ==
From 1981 to 1984, Emery worked as an executive at Texaco. He later worked as an engineering consultant.

=== Missouri House of Representatives ===
Emery served as a member of the Missouri House of Representatives from 2003 to 2011, representing the 126th district. In 2007, Emery served as chair of the House Utilities Committee.

=== Missouri Senate ===
Emery was first elected to the Missouri Senate in 2012 with 64% of the vote over Democrat Charles A. Burton. He was an unsuccessful candidate for the Senate in 2010. During the 2017 legislative session, Emery served as chair of the Senate Government Reform Committee and vice chair of the Senate Commerce, Consumer Protection, Energy and Environment Committee. During his final term in the Senate, Emery served as chair of the Governmental Accountability and Fiscal Oversight Committee.

=== 2022 congressional campaign ===
After incumbent Congresswoman Vicky Hartzler declared her candidacy for the 2022 United States Senate election in Missouri, Emery declared his candidacy for Missouri's 4th congressional district.

== Political positions ==
Emery opposed the expansion of Medicaid and the Affordable Care Act. He was a supporter of school choice, stating in 2016 that "when parents have choices, they get involved" and public schools focus on the "strength of the institution" instead of student achievement.

== Personal life ==
Emery and his wife, Rebecca, had four children. They lived in Lamar, Missouri. On August 3, 2021, Emery collapsed during a campaign event from what was described as a heart problem. He was hospitalized in Columbia, Missouri, and died there three days later, on August 6.

== Electoral history ==
=== State representative ===
Missouri House of Representatives primary election, August 6, 2002, District 126
Party	Candidate	Votes	%	±%
Republican	Ed Emery	2,708	39.35%	
Republican	Bob O'Connor	1,568	22.78%	
Republican	Joe Bartosh	1,556	22.61%	
Republican	Scott Gardner	1,050	15.26%	

Missouri House of Representatives election, November 5, 2002, District 126
Party	Candidate	Votes	%	±%
Republican	Ed Emery	7,904	66.85%	
Democratic	Douglas J. Sprouls	3,920	33.15%	

Missouri House of Representatives election, November 2, 2004, District 126
Party	Candidate	Votes	%	±%
Republican	Ed Emery	12,133	73.67%	+6.82
Democratic	Richard Meyer	4,336	26.33%	−6.82

Missouri House of Representatives election, November 7, 2006, District 126
Party	Candidate	Votes	%	±%
Republican	Ed Emery	9,581	69.94%	−3.73
Democratic	Rich Meyer	4,118	30.06%	+3.73

Missouri House of Representatives election, November 4, 2008, District 126
Party	Candidate	Votes	%	±%
Republican	Ed Emery	11,419	66.88%	−3.06
Democratic	Linda Marie Crane	5,654	33.12%	+3.06

=== State senate ===
Missouri Senate Primary election, August 3, 2010, District 28
Party	Candidate	Votes	%	±%
Republican	Mike Parson	14,518	47.38%	
Republican	Larry D. Wilson	9,590	31.30%	
Republican	Ed Emery	6,533	21.32%	

Missouri Senate Primary election, August 7, 2012, District 31
Party	Candidate	Votes	%	±%
Republican	Ed Emery	10,110	45.97%	+24.64
Republican	Scott Largent	9,605	43.67%	
Republican	Dave Morris	2,279	10.36%	

Missouri Senate election, November 6, 2012, District 31
Party	Candidate	Votes	%	±%
Republican	Ed Emery	49,993	63.79%	+6.56
Democratic	Charles A. (Charlie) Burton	28,375	36.21%	−6.56

Missouri Senate primary election, August 2, 2016, District 31
Party	Candidate	Votes	%	±%
Republican	Ed Emery	17,320	74.99%	+29.02
Republican	Bill Yarberry	5,777	25.01%	

Missouri Senate election, November 8, 2016, District 31
Party	Candidate	Votes	%	±%
Republican	Ed Emery	57,296	72.43%	+8.64
Independent	Tim Wells	11,798	14.92%	+14.92
Libertarian	Lora Young	10,007	12.65%	+12.65
