= 2016 Missouri Secretary of State election =

- November 8, 2016
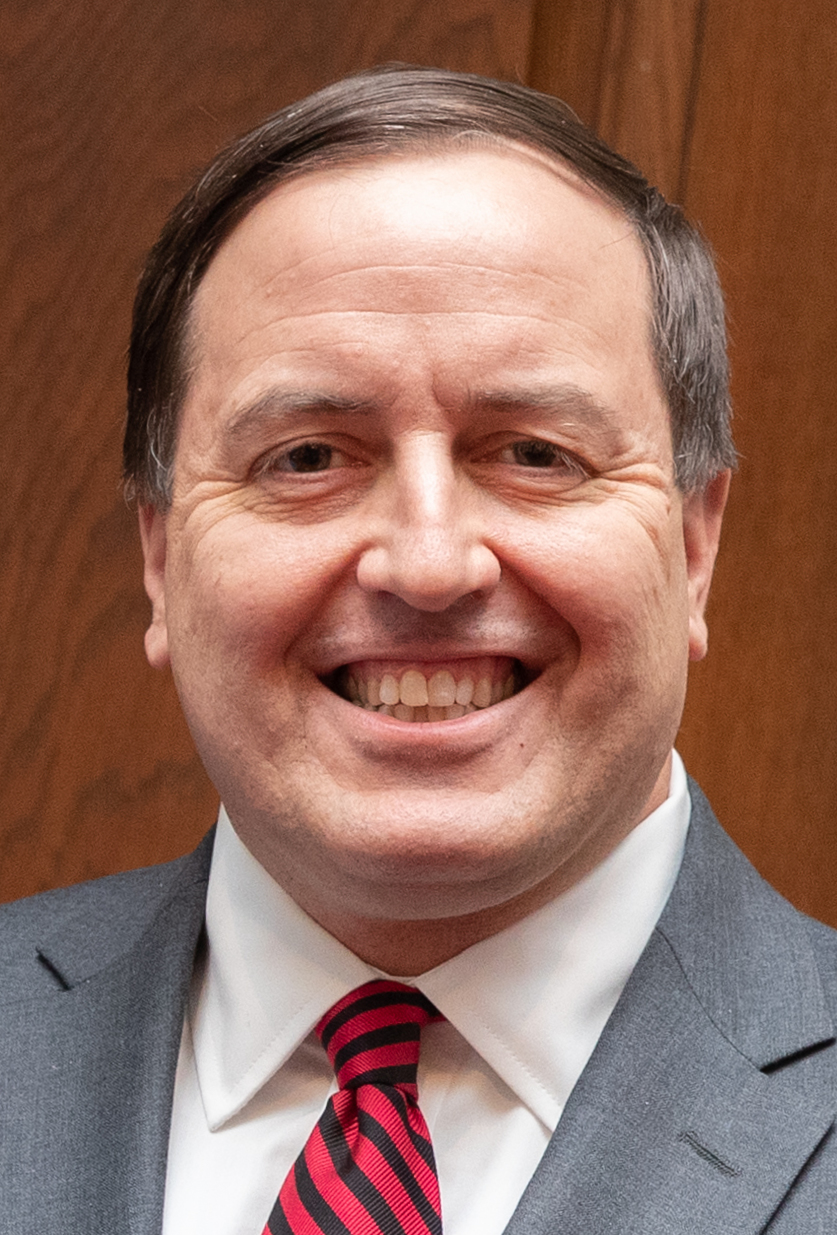

Nominee	Jay Ashcroft	Robin Smith
Party	Republican	Democratic
Popular vote	1,591,086	1,061,788
Percentage	57.6%	38.5%
- Ashcroft: 40–50% 50–60% 60–70% 70–80% 80–90% >90% Smith: 40–50% 50–60% 60–70% 70–80% 80–90% >90% Tie: 40–50% 50% No votes
Secretary of State before election
Jason Kander
Democratic
Elected Secretary of State
Jay Ashcroft
Republican

The 2016 Missouri Secretary of State election was held on November 8, 2016, to elect the Missouri Secretary of State, concurrently with the 2016 U.S. presidential election, as well as elections to the United States Senate and those to the United States House of Representatives and various state and local elections.

Incumbent Democratic secretary of state Jason Kander did not run for re-election to a second term in office and instead unsuccessfully ran in that year's U.S. Senate election for the seat held by Republican incumbent Roy Blunt.

== Democratic primary ==
=== Candidates ===
==== Declared ====
- MD Rabbi Alam, candidate in 2012
- Robin Smith, reporter and former KMOV anchor
- Bill Clinton Young, perennial candidate

==== Withdrawn ====
- Elad Gross, Assistant Missouri Attorney General and nonprofit executive
- Jason Kander, incumbent secretary of state (running for the U.S. Senate)

==== Declined ====
- Jeremy LaFaver, state representative
- Mike Sanders, Jackson County Executive, former Jackson County Prosecuting Attorney and former chairman of the Missouri Democratic Party
- Stephen Webber, state representative
- Clint Zweifel, State Treasurer of Missouri

=== Endorsements ===
Robin Smith
- St. Louis Post-Dispatch
- The Kansas City Star

=== Polling ===
Poll source	Date(s) administered	Sample size	Margin of error	MD Rabbi Alam	Robin Smith	Bill Clinton Young	Undecided
Remington Research Group (R)/Missouri Scout	July 15–16, 2016	1,119	± 3.0%	7%	41%	9%	43%

=== Results ===
Democratic primary results
Party	Candidate	Votes	%
Democratic	Robin Smith	241,736	77.3
Democratic	Bill Clinton Young	50,228	16.1
Democratic	MD Rabbi Alam	20,836	6.7
Total votes		312,800	100.0

== Republican primary ==
=== Candidates ===
==== Declared ====
- Jay Ashcroft, attorney, engineer and nominee for the state senate in 2014
- Roi Chinn
- Will Kraus, state senator

==== Declined ====
- Tim Jones, Speaker of the Missouri House of Representatives
- Mike Kehoe, state senator
- Mike Parson, state senator (running for lieutenant governor)
- Shane Schoeller, Greene County Clerk, former Speaker of the Missouri House of Representatives and nominee for secretary of state in 2012

=== Endorsements ===
Jay Ashcroft
- St. Louis Post-Dispatch
- The Kansas City Star

=== Polling ===
Poll source	Date(s) administered	Sample size	Margin of error	Jay Ashcroft	Roi Chinn	Will Kraus	Undecided
Remington Research Group (R)/Missouri Scout	July 7–8, 2016	1,022	± 3.0%	48%	6%	11%	35%
Remington Research Group (R)/Missouri Scout	June 17–18, 2016	963	± 3.2%	49%	7%	10%	34%
Remington Research Group (R)/Missouri Scout	May 13–14, 2016	1,421	± 2.7%	52%	—	20%	28%
Remington Research Group (R)/Missouri Scout	October 23–24, 2015	1,033	± 3.0%	50%	—	19%	31%
Remington Research Group (R)/Missouri Scout	June 18–19, 2015	1,130	± 3.0%	49%	—	17%	34%
Remington Research Group (R)/Missouri Scout	April 3–4, 2015	621	± 3.9%	51%	—	18%	31%

=== Results ===
Republican primary results
Party	Candidate	Votes	%
Republican	Jay Ashcroft	401,361	61.3
Republican	Will Kraus	226,473	34.6
Republican	Roi Chinn	26,638	4.1
Total votes		654,472	100.0

== Libertarian primary ==
=== Candidates ===
==== Declared ====
- Chris Morrill

=== Results ===
Libertarian primary results
Party	Candidate	Votes	%
Libertarian	Chris Morrill	3,491	100.0
Total votes		3,491	100.0

== Third parties ==
=== Green Party ===
- Julie George-Carlson

== General election ==
=== Polling ===
Poll source	Date(s) administered	Sample size	Margin of error	Robin Smith (D)	Jay Ashcroft (R)	Chris Morrill (L)	Undecided
The Missouri Times/Remington Research Group	September 19–20, 2016	1,076	± 3.2%	38%	48%	4%	10%
Remington Research Group	September 1–2, 2016	1,275	± 3.0%	41%	46%	—	8%
Remington Research Group	August 5–6, 2016	1,280	± 3%	43%	45%	—	7%
Remington Research Group (R)/Missouri Scout	April 15–16, 2016	1,281	± 3.0%	40%	46%	—	14%

=== Results ===
Missouri Secretary of State election, 2016
Party	Candidate	Votes	%	±%
Republican	Jay Ashcroft	1,591,086	57.62%	+10.21%
Democratic	Robin Smith	1,061,788	38.45%	−10.44%
Libertarian	Chris Morrill	108,568	3.93%	+1.26%
Total votes		2,761,442	100.0%	N/A
Republican gain from Democratic				

==== By congressional district ====
Ashcroft won six of eight congressional districts.

District	Smith	Ashcroft	Representative
1st	76%	21%	Lacy Clay
2nd	39%	57%	Ann Wagner
3rd	31%	64%	Blaine Luetkemeyer
4th	30%	66%	Vicky Hartzler
5th	53%	43%	Emanuel Cleaver
6th	31%	65%	Sam Graves
7th	24%	71%	Billy Long
8th	26%	70%	Jason Smith

== See also ==
- 2016 Missouri gubernatorial election
