= Robyn Smith (disambiguation) =

Robyn Smith (born 1944) is an American jockey.

Robyn Smith may refer to:

- Robyn Smith (sports administrator) (born 1960), Australian sports administrator
- Robyn Smith (cartoonist), Jamaican cartoonist
- Robyn Selby Smith (born 1980), Australian rower
- Robyn Archer (born 1948), née Robyn Smith, Australian singer-songwriter and festival director

== See also ==
- Robin Smith (disambiguation)
