= Yinka Faleti =

Nigerian-American politician

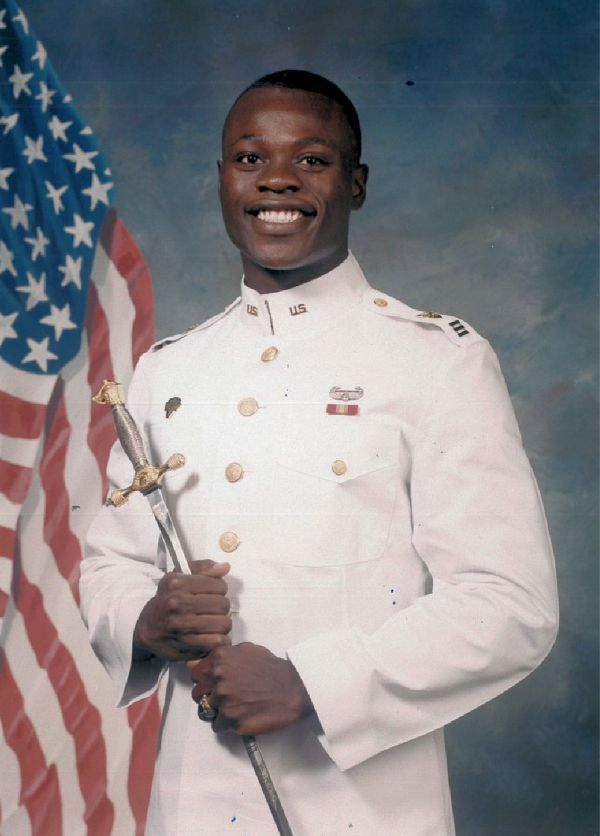
- Born: Adeyinka Faleti; June 20, 1976 (age 50); Lagos, Nigeria
- Education: United States Military Academy (BS); Washington University School of Law (JD)
- Political party: Democratic
- Spouse: Ronke Faleti
- Children: 4
- Military career
- Allegiance: United States
- Branch: United States Army
- Service years: 1998–2004
- Rank: Captain
- Conflicts: Operation Desert Spring; Operation Enduring Freedom
- Website: Campaign website

Adeyinka Faleti (born June 20, 1976) is a Nigerian-American politician and United States Army veteran who was the Democratic candidate in the 2020 Missouri Secretary of State election. He graduated with a Bachelor of Science from the United States Military Academy at West Point and with a Juris Doctor from Washington University in St. Louis.

He has previously worked as the executive director of the nonprofit Forward Through Ferguson, the senior vice president of United Way of Greater St. Louis, a state prosecutor at the St. Louis Circuit Attorney's Office, and a litigation attorney at international law firm Bryan Cave.

Faleti lives with his wife, Ronke, and their four children in St. Louis, Missouri.

== Early life and education ==
Faleti was born in Lagos, Nigeria. In the mid-1970s, his father immigrated to the United States and moved to New York City. His mother left three years after and left Faleti with his grandparents until he was able to get a Visa. 7 years after his father's move, Faleti arrived at John F. Kennedy Airport in New York and met his dad and two younger siblings for the first time. Growing up, his family lived in New York, Virginia, Florida, Mississippi, and Texas.

Faleti graduated from the Texas Academy of Mathematics and Sciences with a high school diploma. He went on to study human factors engineering at the United States Military Academy and graduated in 1998. In 2007, he earned his J.D. degree from Washington University School of Law.

== Career ==
=== Military service (1998–2004) ===
After graduating from West Point, Faleti served in the U.S. Army for six years as an active-duty officer from 1998 to 2004. He served a tour in Operation Enduring Freedom. He was also a tank platoon leader in Fort Hood and trained with 15 soldiers in M1A2 tanks.

At the time of his departure from the military, he had reached the ranks of Captain and Company commander.

=== Law school (2004–2007) ===
In 2004, Faleti left the military and moved to St. Louis to begin law school at the Washington University School of Law. While attending law school, he was the president of the WashU Law Black Law Students Association. He also competed in the Trial Advocacy Team, earned Best Advocate in 2005, and served as team captain on the 2006 finalist team.

=== Law career (2007–2013) ===
Upon graduating law school in 2007, Faleti worked as a litigation attorney at the St. Louis location of international law firm Bryan Cave (now Bryan Cave Leighton Paisner). In 2011, he became a state prosecutor in the St. Louis Circuit Attorney's Office and served for nearly three years.

=== Nonprofit executive (2013–2019) ===
In 2013, Faleti began serving as Senior Vice President of Philanthropic, Donor, and Community Services at the United Way of Greater St. Louis. In his tenure at United Way, he directed fundraising and volunteer efforts and raised more than $300 million for St. Louis.

In 2018, he became the Executive Director of Forward Through Ferguson, a St. Louis-region nonprofit formed to implement changes proposed by the Ferguson Commission Report. After Michael Brown’s death in Ferguson, Missouri Governor Jay Nixon appointed a coalition of regional leaders to form the Ferguson Commission. The Commission was to complete a “thorough, wide-ranging and unflinching study of the social and economic conditions that impede progress, equality and safety in the St. Louis region,” which culminated in the Ferguson Commission Report's release in 2015.

Faleti was awarded the Immigrant Working Professional Award in the St. Louis Mosaic Project's 2018 Mosaic Workplace Awards for his work at Forward Through Ferguson.

=== Missouri Secretary of State candidate (2019–2020) ===
In October 2019, Faleti announced that he was running for Missouri Secretary of State in 2020 against the Republican incumbent Jay Ashcroft. The Missouri Democratic Party announced him as their nominee in April 2020. He stated that he is running for office "to increase opportunities to vote, reduce barriers to voter participation and protect and honor our ballot initiative process." If elected, he would have been the first African American to hold statewide office in Missouri.

Faleti garnered significant statewide media attention when he fundraised more than 7 times the amount of his opponent, Republican incumbent Jay Ashcroft, in the second quarter of 2020. Aside from the election for governor, Faleti in this time period raised more than any candidate running for statewide office in Missouri. Ultimately, Ashcroft won the election over Faleti.

Faleti's endorsements included Let America Vote, St. Louis Post Dispatch, St. Louis American, Vote Vets, Missouri AFL-CIO and St. Louis Labor Council, End Citizens United, Access MO, Collective PAC, Indivisible St. Louis, Planned Parenthood Action Fund and NARAL Missouri.

=== Local business leader (2021-present) ===
In 2021, Faleti became Chair of the Board of Directors of nonprofit organization Veterans for Political Innovation.

The following year, Faleti became a partner at St. Louis-based venture capital firm, Ascend Venture Partners. His role focuses on offering financial backing to early-stage startup founders of marginalized identities, who have historically have less access to capital.

Party political offices
| Preceded by Robin Smith | Democratic nominee for Secretary of State of Missouri; 2020 | Succeeded by Barbara Phifer |
