= Barbara Phifer =

American politician

Member of the Missouri House of Representatives from the 90th district
- In office January 6, 2021 – January 8, 2025
- Preceded by: Deb Lavender
- Succeeded by: Mark Boyko

Personal details
- Born: Washington, D.C., U.S.
- Party: Democratic
- Spouse: Thomas
- Children: 5
- Education: Cornell College (BA); Oklahoma City University (MDiv)
- Website: Campaign website

Barbara Phifer is an American politician and former United Methodist pastor who was a Democratic member of the Missouri House of Representatives from 2021 to 2025, representing the 90th district. She was the Democratic candidate in the 2024 Missouri Secretary of State election.

== Early life and education ==
Born in Washington, D.C., Phifer is a graduate of Cornell College, where she earned a Bachelor of Arts in philosophy and history in 1977. She then attended St. Paul School of Theology at Oklahoma City University, where she received a master's degree in theology in 1980.

== Career ==
Phfier has served as a United Methodist pastor for over 40 years. Her preaching career included a five-year stint in Montevideo, Uruguay under a dictatorship, an experience which she said gave her "an understanding of the dangers of authoritarianism, which is what I see in the [Republican] party right now". Along with her criticism of Donald Trump, Phifer ran on a platform of expanding Medicaid, improving public education, and supporting gun control and social justice issues such as women's and LGBTQ rights.

Phifer had not thought about entering politics until after retiring from preaching, but decided to run for the seat vacated by Deb Lavender who was running for state Senate. In 2020, Phifer defeated her Republican opponent in the general election for Missouri's 90th state House district.

In March 2024, Phifer announced her candidacy for Missouri Secretary of State in front of the Jefferson City Missouri River Regional Library. She criticized book banning efforts in Missouri and expressed a commitment to neutral ballot language. She lost the race to Denny Hoskins.

== Personal life ==
Phifer lives in Kirkwood, Missouri with her husband Thomas, and has five children and seven grandchildren.

== Electoral history ==
Phifer had no opponents in the Democratic primary elections for the Missouri House of Representatives, winning the party nomination by default each time.

Missouri House of Representatives Election, November 3, 2020, District 90
Party	Candidate	Votes	%	±%
Democratic	Barbara Phifer	13,858	56.72%	−43.28
Republican	Anne Landers	10,575	43.28%	+43.28
Total votes		24,433	100.00%	

Missouri House of Representatives Election, November 8, 2022, District 90
Party	Candidate	Votes	%	±%
Democratic	Barbara Phifer	11,355	62.56%	+5.84
Republican	Gary Albert Bokermann, Jr.	6,795	37.44%	−5.84
Total votes		18,150	100.00%	

2024 Missouri Secretary of State election Democratic Primary Results by County Phifer: 30–40%; 40–50%; Williams: 30–40%; 40–50%; Jacobsen: 30–40%; 40–50%; 50–60%; Tie: 30–40%

2024 Missouri Secretary of State Election, Democratic primary, August 6, 2024
Party	Candidate	Votes	%
Democratic	Barbara Phifer	146,284	40.86
Democratic	Monique Williams	123,270	34.43
Democratic	Haley Jacobsen	88,491	24.72
Total votes		358,045	100.00

Missouri House of Representatives
Preceded by Deb Lavender	Member of the Missouri House of Representatives from the 90th district 2021–present	Incumbent
Party political offices
Preceded by Yinka Faleti	Democratic nominee for Secretary of State of Missouri; 2024	Most recent
