= Denny Hoskins =

American politician

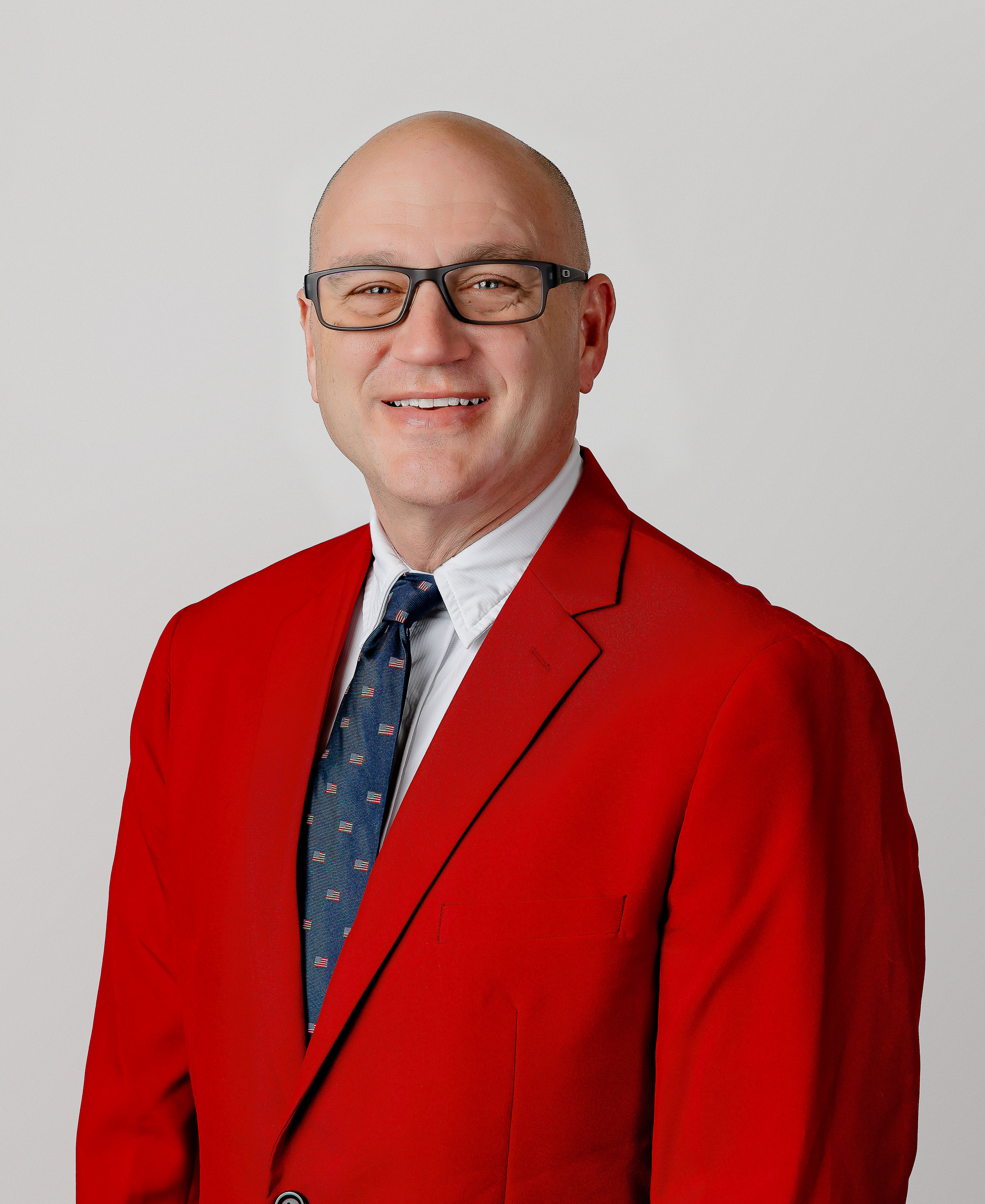
- Official portrait, 2025

41st Secretary of State of Missouri
- Incumbent
- Assumed office January 13, 2025
- Governor: Mike Kehoe
- Preceded by: Jay Ashcroft

Member of the Missouri Senate from the 21st district
- In office January 4, 2017 – January 13, 2025
- Preceded by: David Pearce
- Succeeded by: Kurtis Gregory

Member of the Missouri House of Representatives from the 54th district
- In office January 9, 2013 – January 4, 2017
- Preceded by: Jeanie Lauer
- Succeeded by: Dan Houx

Member of the Missouri House of Representatives from the 121st district
- In office January 3, 2009 – January 9, 2013
- Preceded by: David Pearce
- Succeeded by: Keith Frederick

Personal details
- Born: October 10, 1974 (age 52) Jefferson City, Missouri, U.S.
- Party: Republican
- Spouse: Michelle Rogers
- Children: 5
- Education: University of Central Missouri (BBA)

Denny L. Hoskins (born October 10, 1974) is an American politician who is currently serving as the 41st Secretary of State of Missouri since 2025. He previously served as a member of the Missouri Senate for the 21st District until 2024. A member of the Republican Party, he was first elected to the Senate in 2016. He previously served in the Missouri House of Representatives from 2009 to 2017. He is best known for disregarding the will of the Missouri populace, to which the Missouri Supreme Court held him in contempt until he corrected.

== Missouri House of Representatives ==
Hoskins was first elected to the Missouri House of Representatives in 2008 to represent the 121st District. Hoskins was reelected in the 2010, 2012, and 2014 elections. Hoskins was term limited and ran for the Missouri Senate in the 2016 election.

== Missouri Senate ==
Hoskins was elected to the Missouri Senate in the 2016 election to represent the 21st District. In the midst of Missouri facing a budget shortfall, one of Hoskins' first votes as a state senator was to vote for a pay increase for state legislators. Hoskins was one of only two senators to vote for the pay increase.

In 2021, during the COVID-19 pandemic, Hoskins called for a special session of the Missouri legislature to implement legislation to prevent private-sector companies from requiring COVID-19 vaccinations for staff and customers.

Hoskins has filibustered sports betting legislation in Missouri that doesn't include language on video lottery terminals (VLTs). Adding his own sportsbook regulation bills, Hoskins sees VLTs in the same area that needs to become regulated and taxed.

He was a member of the Missouri Freedom Caucus.

=== Defamation lawsuit ===
In April 2024, Hoskins was sued for defamation by Denton Loudermill of Olathe, Kansas, after Hoskins shared an image on social media of Loudermill in handcuffs, falsely identifying him as an undocumented immigrant and as a shooter at the 2024 Kansas City parade shooting.

Whistleblower Lawsuit

On September 14, 2026, Hoskins was sued by the former Election Integrity Director. The allegations include that Nicholas La Strada was fired after raising concerns that staff were plotting to file fake complaints about the state voter database.

== Missouri Secretary of State ==
In March 2025, Hoskins suspended payments for library subscriptions to OverDrive, Inc., a supplier for digital audiobooks and ebooks, alleging the app gives minors access to inappropriate content. In July 2026, Hoskins threatened to pull funding from Daniel Boone Regional Library in Columbia, Missouri over an LGBTQ-themed story time.

In 2025 and 2026, Hoskins was challenged with lawsuits for "deceptive and prejudicial" ballot summaries for initiative petitions related to education funding and access, an amendment to remove income tax and expand sales tax, and others.

On September 10, 2026, the Supreme Court of Missouri found Hoskins in contempt of court for his refusal to implement their ruling regarding the state's congressional maps and 2026 Missouri Proposition A. He subsequently agreed to direct clerks to use the correct legal map.

In 2026, Hoskins directed Missouri election officials to implement a congressional map enacted by the General Assembly in 2025 during an extraordinary session, which was used for the August primary. On August 4, Hoskins declared that the referendum was "unconstitutional" and would not appear on the November ballot. On September 3, the Supreme Court of Missouri ruled that the referendum petition was sufficient and prevented the 2025 map from taking effect before voters considered it in the November election. The court stated that the 2025 map "is not the law and never has been the law" in Missouri and ordered that the congressional map enacted in 2022 be used for the November election.

Hoskins sought a stay of the Supreme Court of Missouri ruling from the U.S. Supreme Court, which Justice Brett Kavanaugh denied on September 8. On September 10, after a federal district court ordered use of the 2025 map in a separate case, Onder v. State of Missouri, the U.S. Supreme Court stayed that order, leaving the 2022 map in effect.

After the U.S. Court of Appeals for the Eighth Circuit ruled on September 21 that the 2025 map should be used, the U.S. Supreme Court stayed that ruling on September 25. In the opinion, the Court reiterated that under Missouri law, the 2025 map had not taken effect and that the 2022 map was to be used for the 2026 midterm general election.

== Electoral history ==
=== State representative ===
Missouri House of Representatives Primary Election, August 5, 2008, District 121
Party	Candidate	Votes	%	±%
Republican	Denny L. Hoskins	1,246	72.32%	
Republican	Steven R. Hedrick	477	27.68%	

Missouri House of Representatives Election, November 4, 2008, District 121
Party	Candidate	Votes	%	±%
Republican	Denny L. Hoskins	7,008	50.44%	−16.59
Democratic	Jim Jackson	6,886	49.56%	+21.24

Missouri House of Representatives Election, November 2, 2010, District 121
Party	Candidate	Votes	%	±%
Republican	Denny L. Hoskins	5,292	57.85%	+7.41
Democratic	Courtney Cole	3,480	38.04%	−11.52
Libertarian	Bill Wayne	376	4.11%	+4.11

Missouri House of Representatives Election, November 6, 2012, District 54
Party	Candidate	Votes	%	±%
Republican	Denny Hoskins	9,342	62.01%	+4.16
Democratic	Nancy Maxwell	4,511	29.95%	−8.09
Independent	Eddie Osborne	1,211	8.04%	+8.04

Missouri House of Representatives Election, November 4, 2014, District 54
Party	Candidate	Votes	%	±%
Republican	Denny Hoskins	6,421	79.54%	+17.53
Constitution	Daniel Piemons	1,652	20.46%	+20.46

=== State Senate ===
Missouri Senate Primary Election, August 2, 2016, District 21
Party	Candidate	Votes	%	±%
Republican	Denny Hoskins	11,219	58.51%	
Republican	Mike McGhee	7,954	41.49%	

Missouri Senate Election, November 8, 2016, District 21
Party	Candidate	Votes	%	±%
Republican	Denny Hoskins	50,288	67.63	+2.50
Democratic	ElGene Ver Dught	19,988	26.88	−3.39
Libertarian	William Truman (Bill) Wayne	4,077	5.48	+0.88

Missouri Senate Election, November 3, 2020, District 21
Party	Candidate	Votes	%	±%
Republican	Denny Hoskins	61,698	79.82	+12.19
Libertarian	Mark Bliss	15,595	20.18	+14.70

=== Secretary of State ===
Missouri Secretary of State Primary Election, August 6, 2024
Party	Candidate	Votes	%
Republican	Denny Hoskins	157,116	24.42
Republican	Shane Schoeller	108,289	16.83
Republican	Mike Carter	91,866	14.28
Republican	Dean Plocher	86,659	13.47
Republican	Mary Elizabeth Coleman	72,938	11.34
Republican	Valentina Gomez	47,931	7.45
Republican	Jamie Corley	46,314	7.20
Republican	Adam Schwadron	32,335	5.03
Total votes		643,448	100.00

2024 Missouri Secretary of State election, November 5, 2024
Party	Candidate	Votes	%	±%
Republican	Denny Hoskins	1,677,902	57.66%	−2.93%
Democratic	Barbara Phifer	1,154,090	39.66%	+3.38%
Libertarian	Carl Freese	49,113	1.69%	−0.18%
Green	Jerome Bauer	29,012	1.00%	+0.19%
Total votes		2,910,117	100.00%	N/A
Republican hold				

Party political offices
Preceded by Jay Ashcroft	Republican nominee for Secretary of State of Missouri; 2024	Most recent
Political offices
Preceded by Jay Ashcroft	Secretary of State of Missouri; 2025–present	Incumbent
