= David Pearce (politician) =

American politician

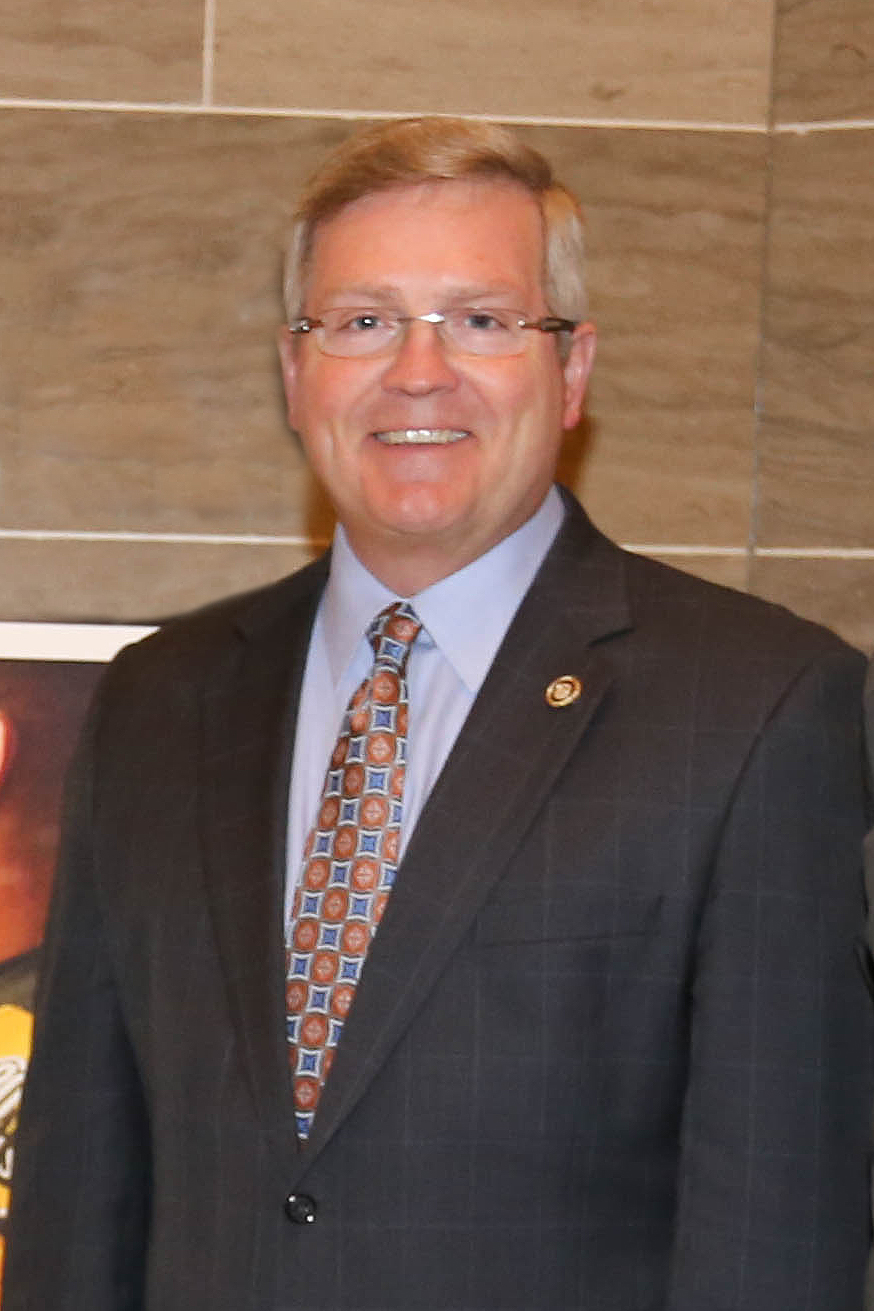

Member of the Missouri Senate from the 21st district
- In office January 2013 – January 2017
- Preceded by: Bill Stouffer
- Succeeded by: Denny Hoskins

Member of the Missouri Senate from the 31st district
- In office January 2009 – January 2013
- Preceded by: Chris Koster
- Succeeded by: Ed Emery

Member of the Missouri House of Representatives from the 121st district
- In office January 2003 – January 2009
- Preceded by: Deleta P. Williams
- Succeeded by: Denny Hoskins

Personal details
- Born: March 30, 1960 (age 66) Warrensburg, Missouri
- Party: Republican
- Spouse: Teresa
- Children: 2

David Pearce (born March 30, 1960, in Warrensburg, Missouri) became the Executive Director for Government Relations at the University of Central Missouri in 2019. Previously he was a Republican member of the Missouri Senate, he represented the 31st and 21st District from 2009 to 2017. Prior to that, he was a member of the Missouri House of Representatives from 2003 to 2009.

As a state senator Pearce was the Senior Policy Coordinator at the Missouri State Treasurer's Office. He was chair of the Senate Education Committee for five years and on the Appropriations Committee for his entire tenure in the Senate. He was also on the Agriculture Committee and was Chair of the Midwestern Higher Education Compact and on the Missouri Veteran’s Commission.
