= 2020 Missouri Secretary of State election =

- November 3, 2020
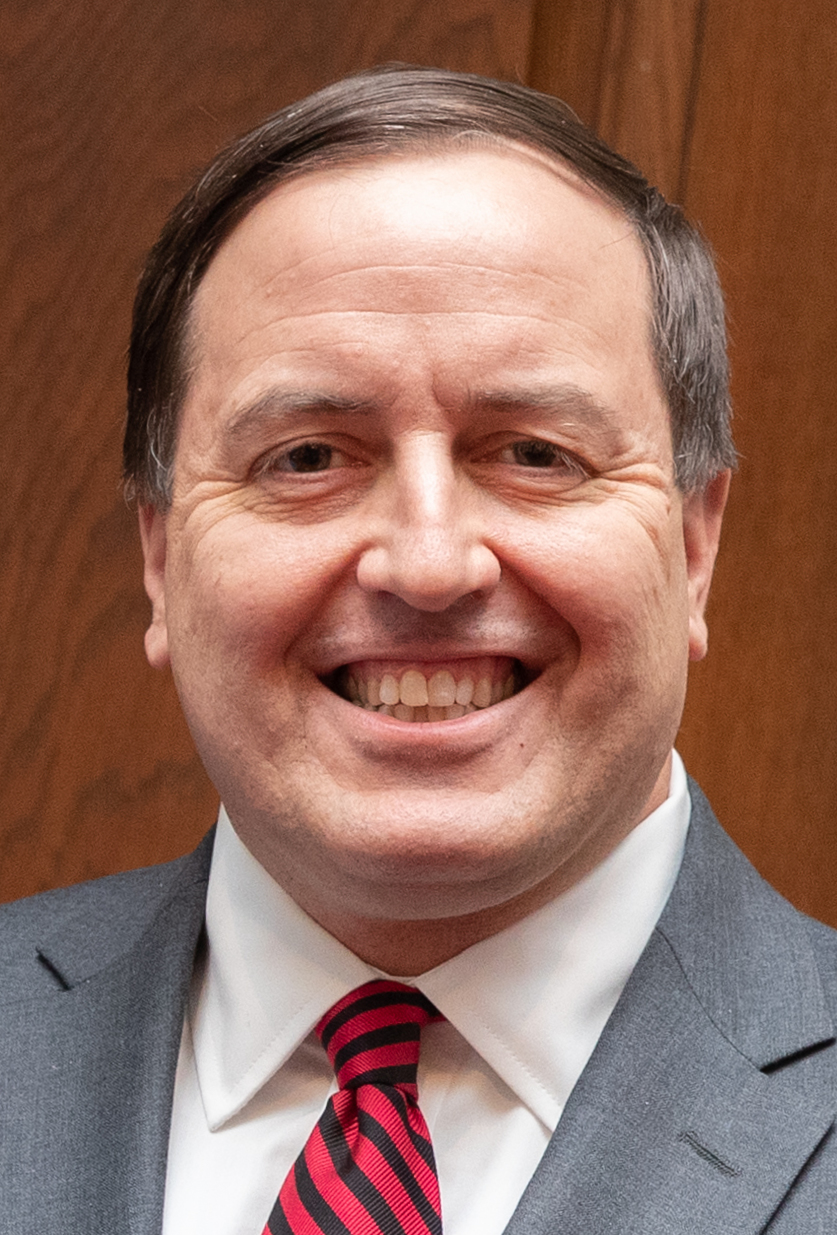

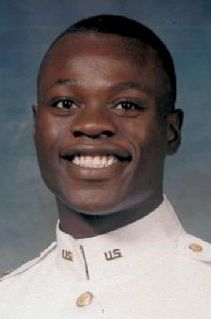
Nominee	Jay Ashcroft	Yinka Faleti
Party	Republican	Democratic
Popular vote	1,790,873	1,072,415
Percentage	60.59%	36.28%
- Ashcroft: 40–50% 50–60% 60–70% 70–80% 80–90% >90% Faleti: 40–50% 50–60% 60–70% 70–80% 80–90% >90% Tie: 40–50% 50% No data
Secretary of State before election
Jay Ashcroft
Republican
Elected Secretary of State
Jay Ashcroft
Republican

The 2020 Missouri Secretary of State General election was held on November 3, 2020, to elect the Secretary of State of Missouri. It was held concurrently with the 2020 U.S. presidential election, along with elections to the United States Senate and United States House of Representatives, as well as various state and local elections. Incumbent Republican Secretary of State Jay Ashcroft won re-election to a second term. Ashcroft won with more votes than any candidate in Missouri history.

== Republican primary ==
=== Candidates ===
==== Declared ====
- Jay Ashcroft, incumbent Secretary of State of Missouri

==== Withdrawn before primary ====
- Dale Manzo, student at Harvard University and COO of Manchester Electrical Contractors

=== Results ===
Republican primary results
Party	Candidate	Votes	%
Republican	Jay Ashcroft (incumbent)	620,822	100.0%
Total votes		620,822	100.0%

== Democratic primary ==
=== Candidates ===
==== Declared ====
- Yinka Faleti, nonprofit executive and U.S. Army veteran

=== Results ===
Democratic primary results
Party	Candidate	Votes	%
Democratic	Yinka Faleti	470,955	100.0%
Total votes		470,955	100.0%

== Third parties ==
=== Constitution Party ===
==== Candidates ====
===== Declared =====
- Paul Venable, information technology consultant

==== Results ====
Constitution primary results
Party	Candidate	Votes	%
Constitution	Paul Venable	573	100.0%
Total votes		573	100.0%

=== Green Party ===
==== Candidates ====
===== Declared =====
- Paul Lehmann, farmer

==== Results ====
Green primary results
Party	Candidate	Votes	%
Green	Paul Lehmann	860	100.0%
Total votes		860	100.0%

=== Libertarian Party ===
==== Candidates ====
===== Declared =====
- Carl Herman Freese, security officer

==== Results ====
Libertarian primary results
Party	Candidate	Votes	%
Libertarian	Carl Herman Freese	4,074	100.0%
Total votes		4,074	100.0%

== General election ==
=== Predictions ===
Source	Ranking	As of
The Cook Political Report	Safe R	June 25, 2020

=== Polling ===
Poll source	Date(s) administered	Sample size (Note: Key: A – all adults RV – registered voters LV – likely voters V – unclear)	Margin of error	John Jay Ashcroft (R)	Yinka Faleti (D)	Undecided
Remington Research Group/Missouri Scout	August 12–13, 2020	1112 (LV)	± 3.0%	55%	38%	7%
Human Agency/Missouri Scout	December 20–24, 2019	415 (RV)	± 5%	55%	31%	14%
Human Agency/Missouri Scout	October 18–20, 2019	550 (RV)	± 4%	51%	30%	19%

=== Results ===
Missouri Secretary of State election, 2020
Party	Candidate	Votes	%	±%
Republican	Jay Ashcroft (incumbent)	1,790,873	60.59%	+2.97%
Democratic	Yinka Faleti	1,072,415	36.28%	−2.17%
Libertarian	Carl Herman Freese	55,320	1.87%	−2.06%
Green	Paul Lehmann	23,981	0.81%	N/A
Constitution	Paul Venable	13,066	0.44%	N/A
Total votes		2,955,655	100.0%	
Republican hold				

==== By congressional district ====
Ashcroft won six of eight congressional districts.

District	Ashcroft	Faleti	Representative
1st	21%	76%	Lacy Clay (116th Congress)
1st	21%	76%	Cori Bush (117th Congress)
2nd	56%	42%	Ann Wagner
3rd	70%	27%	Blaine Luetkemeyer
4th	69%	27%	Vicky Hartzler
5th	43%	53%	Emanuel Cleaver
6th	68%	29%	Sam Graves
7th	73%	24%	Billy Long
8th	79%	18%	Jason Smith

== See also ==
- 2020 Missouri gubernatorial election
