= Jay Ashcroft =

American politician (born 1973)

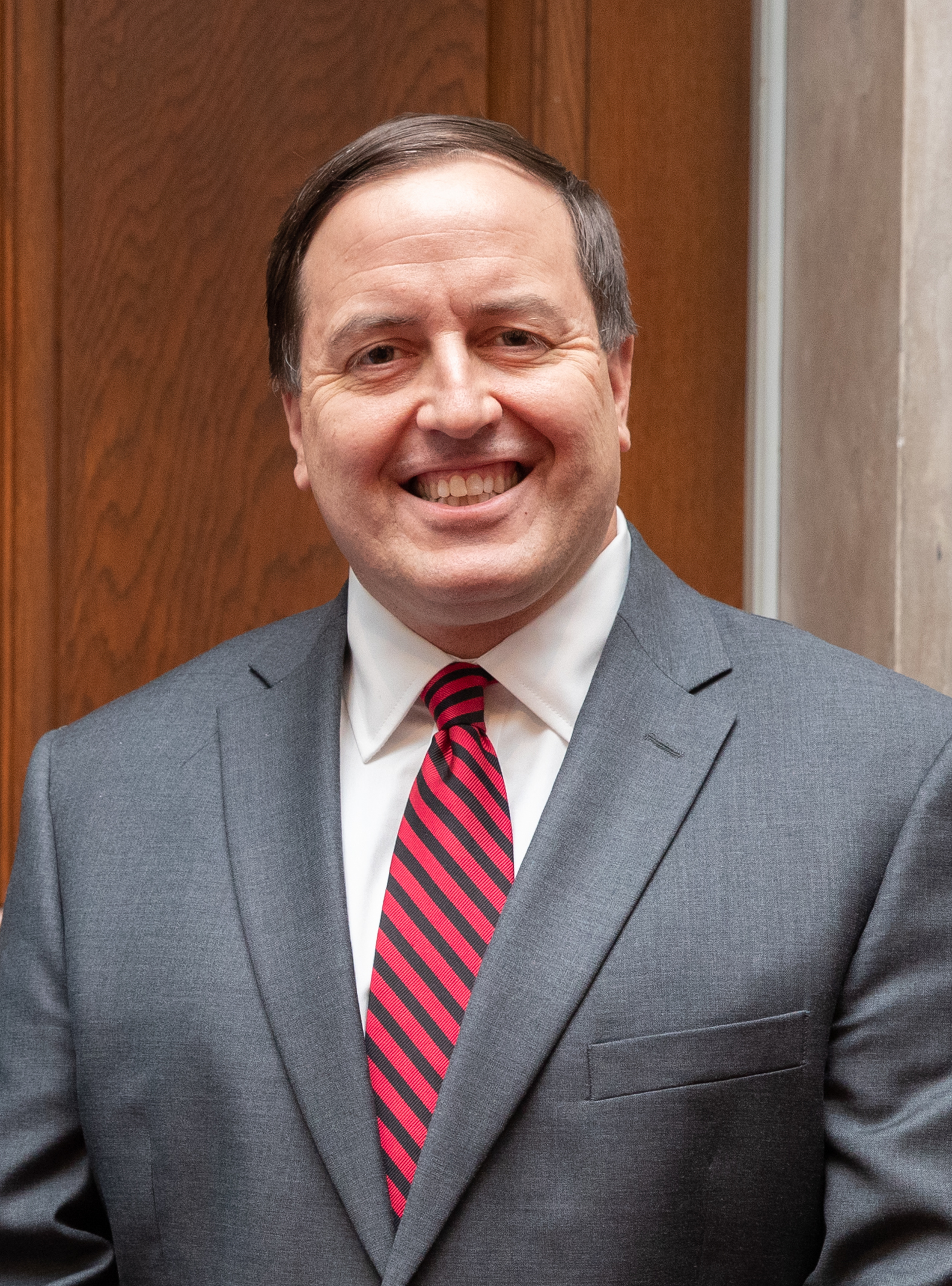

40th Secretary of State of Missouri
- In office January 9, 2017 – January 13, 2025
- Governor: Eric Greitens; Mike Parson
- Preceded by: Jason Kander
- Succeeded by: Denny Hoskins

Personal details
- Born: John Robert Ashcroft; July 12, 1973 (age 53) Jefferson City, Missouri, U.S.
- Party: Republican
- Relatives: John Ashcroft (father)
- Education: Missouri University of Science and Technology (BS, MS); Saint Louis University (JD)

John Robert "Jay" Ashcroft (born July 12, 1973) is an American attorney and politician who served as the 40th secretary of state of Missouri from 2017 to 2025. A member of the Republican Party, he is the son of former United States Attorney General John Ashcroft.

As Missouri Secretary of State, Ashcroft pushed for stricter voter identification laws, fought against ballot initiatives, supported an investigation into former Missouri Attorney General Josh Hawley, and restricted library services for minors.

Ashcroft was a candidate in the 2024 Missouri gubernatorial election, but came in third place in the primary against State Senator Bill Eigel and Lt. Governor Mike Kehoe.

== Early life ==
Ashcroft is the son of politician John Ashcroft.

Ashcroft attended the United States Merchant Marine Academy, but did not graduate. He earned his Bachelor of Science and Master of Science degrees in engineering management from Missouri University of Science and Technology. He then worked as an engineer intern and educator. Ashcroft later attended law school, earning his Juris Doctor from Saint Louis University School of Law. After law school, he worked for a law firm's intellectual property division. He later worked for his father in the Ashcroft Law Firm, where he assisted businesses impacted by government regulations and counseled clients on patent prosecution, regulatory compliance, and election law.

== Political career ==
Ashcroft ran for the Missouri Senate in 2014, losing to Democrat Jill Schupp. He ran for Missouri Secretary of State in the 2016 election, defeating state senator Will Kraus in the Republican primary election and former KMOV anchor Robin Smith in the general election. In 2020, Ashcroft won re-election against Democrat Yinka Faleti.

Following his 2024 Missouri gubernatorial election campaign, Ashcroft announced "no intention" to run for another office.

=== Political issues ===
==== Abortion ====
Ashcroft opposes abortion. As Secretary of State, Ashcroft wrote ballot summaries for initiatives seeking to reverse the Missouri ban on abortions. Judge John E. Beetem rewrote the summaries for all six initiatives. In his view, Ashcroft's summaries did not fairly represent the purposes or effect and lacked reference to alternative reproductive care mentioned in the initiatives. Ashcroft appealed the case to Supreme Court of Missouri; it was denied less than a week later.

==== Elections ====
Ashcroft is a staunch supporter of stricter voter ID laws. Ashcroft's claims about voter fraud, as well as the need for photo ID laws to combat voter fraud, were a central aspect of his 2016 campaign for the office of Missouri Secretary of State. He has asserted that voter fraud is common enough to have "changed elections." Election fraud did change the outcome in a Kansas City election when an aunt and uncle voted illegally for a state representative who won by one vote. The type of voter fraud that would be addressed through Ashcroft's preferred legislation, which critics say suppresses turnout, is extremely rare. In defending a push for stricter photo-ID laws, Ashcroft cited one instance where a couple illegally voted, but omitted that the photo-ID laws that Ashcroft was advocating for would not have prevented the couple from voting. According to the Kansas City Star, "there has never been a reported case of voter impersonation fraud in Missouri." In June 2018, Ashcroft said that voter fraud was "an exponentially greater threat than hacking."

On July 3, 2017, Ashcroft said that he would comply with a request by the Presidential Advisory Commission on Election Integrity, a commission appointed by Trump to investigate supposed voter fraud, to a request for Missourians voting data. At the time, Missouri was one of only three states to comply with the commission - which was required by Missouri law. Officials of both parties in many states declined to turn over data to the commission, variously citing voter privacy and stating that the commission would legitimize Trump's false claims of massive voter fraud. He said he would give out voters' names, addresses, birthdates, where they voted and when, also required by Missouri law.

Ashcroft has backed a number of Republican proposals to reduce the number of Missouri ballot initiative petitions and make it harder for ballot initiatives to win approval in elections.

In March 2023, Ashcroft announced that he is withdrawing Missouri from Electronic Registration Information Center, a bipartisan system to update and improve the accuracy of voter rolls. His office declined to share reports from the decision or cyber security reviews on elections with the state auditor, leading to a "fair" rating in an audit released in February 2024.

==== Investigation of Josh Hawley ====
In December 2018, Ashcroft, who as Secretary of State does not have the power to issue subpoenas, asked Missouri State Auditor Nicole Galloway, who can issue subpoenas, to cooperate in an investigation into then-Missouri Attorney General Josh Hawley for using public resources in his successful 2018 campaign for the U.S. Senate. In February 2019, Ashcroft ended his investigation into Hawley, declaring that there was no evidence that Hawley or the AG's office had violated election law.

==== Investments rules ====
In 2023, following the failure of a bill related to environmental, social, and governance (ESG) investment practices in Missouri Congress, Ashcroft utilized the powers of his office to set a rule requiring disclosure forms for utilization of ESG scores. The rule has been criticized as "anti-free market" by the Sierra Club, and the Chamber of Commerce described it as "vague" and "burdensome." The Missouri Secretary of State office's oversight over securities rules is unusual relative to other Secretary of State offices.

Ashcroft's office hired campaign donors as independent counsel in a lawsuit challenging the rules. By January 2024, costs paid to firm Graves Garrett had exceeded $167,000. As attorney general Andrew Bailey declined requests to use the state Legal Expense Fund, the additional estimated costs of $1.2 million are contingent on approval from state congress.

Ashcroft told the National Review that the bill is aimed to counter a Biden veto on federal ESG laws. The coordinated targeting of ESG practices are led by conservative lawyer Leonard Leo.

==== Library censorship ====
As Secretary of State in 2022, Ashcroft proposed restrictions on materials available to minors in public libraries. The proposal details procedures and processes each library would be required to implement in order to continue receiving state funding. More than 10,000 comments were submitted in the 30-day public comment period, and library industry leaders and associations voiced their opposition. In response to backlash, Ashcroft described the state-wide rules as a move toward "local control" and said "I'm not the one making a big deal about this. It's the libraries."

The implementation of Ashcroft's rule has been described as "mass confusion" for libraries as they attempt to comply with restrictions that could be interpreted broadly.

==== Opposition to Medicaid expansion ====
After Missouri voters voted in favor of Medicaid expansion, Ashcroft applauded efforts by Republicans in the Missouri legislature to block funding for Medicaid expansion.

==== Veterans ====
Ashcroft has stated appreciation for veterans. In 2024, his response to a candidate forum question about supporting veterans and active military personnel was criticized for suggesting the removal of veterans' benefits.

== Electoral history ==
=== State Senate ===
2014 Missouri Senate election, 24th district
Party	Candidate	Votes	%	±%
Democratic	Jill Schupp	28,022	50.09%	+0.19
Republican	John R. "Jay" Ashcroft	26,196	46.82%	−3.28
Libertarian	Jim Higgins	1,727	3.09%	+3.09

=== Secretary of State ===
2016 Missouri Secretary of State Republican primary
Party	Candidate	Votes	%	±%
Republican	John R. "Jay" Ashcroft	401,361	61.33%	
Republican	Will Kraus	226,473	34.60%	
Republican	Roi Chinn	26,638	4.07%	

2016 Missouri Secretary of State election
Party	Candidate	Votes	%	±%
Republican	John R. "Jay" Ashcroft	1,591,086	57.62%	+10.21
Democratic	Robin Smith	1,061,788	38.45%	−10.43
Libertarian	Chris Morrill	108,568	3.93%	+1.26

2020 Missouri Secretary of State election
Party	Candidate	Votes	%	±%
Republican	John R. "Jay" Ashcroft (incumbent)	1,790,873	60.59%	+2.97%
Democratic	Yinka Faleti	1,072,415	36.28%	−2.17%
Libertarian	Carl Herman Freese	55,320	1.87%	−2.06%
Green	Paul Lehmann	23,981	0.81%	N/A
Constitution	Paul Venable	13,066	0.44%	N/A

=== Governor ===
2024 Missouri gubernatorial election, Primary, August 5, 2024
Party	Candidate	Votes	%	±%
Republican	Mike Kehoe	275,139	39.41	
Republican	Bill Eigel	227,257	32.55	
Republican	John R. (Jay) Ashcroft	162,314	23.25	
Republican	6 others	33,492	4.80	
Total votes		698,202	100.00	

Party political offices
Preceded by Shane Schoeller	Republican nominee for Secretary of State of Missouri; 2016, 2020	Succeeded by Denny Hoskins
Political offices
Preceded by Jason Kander	Secretary of State of Missouri; 2017–2025	Succeeded by Denny Hoskins
