= Valentina Gomez =

Colombian American politician

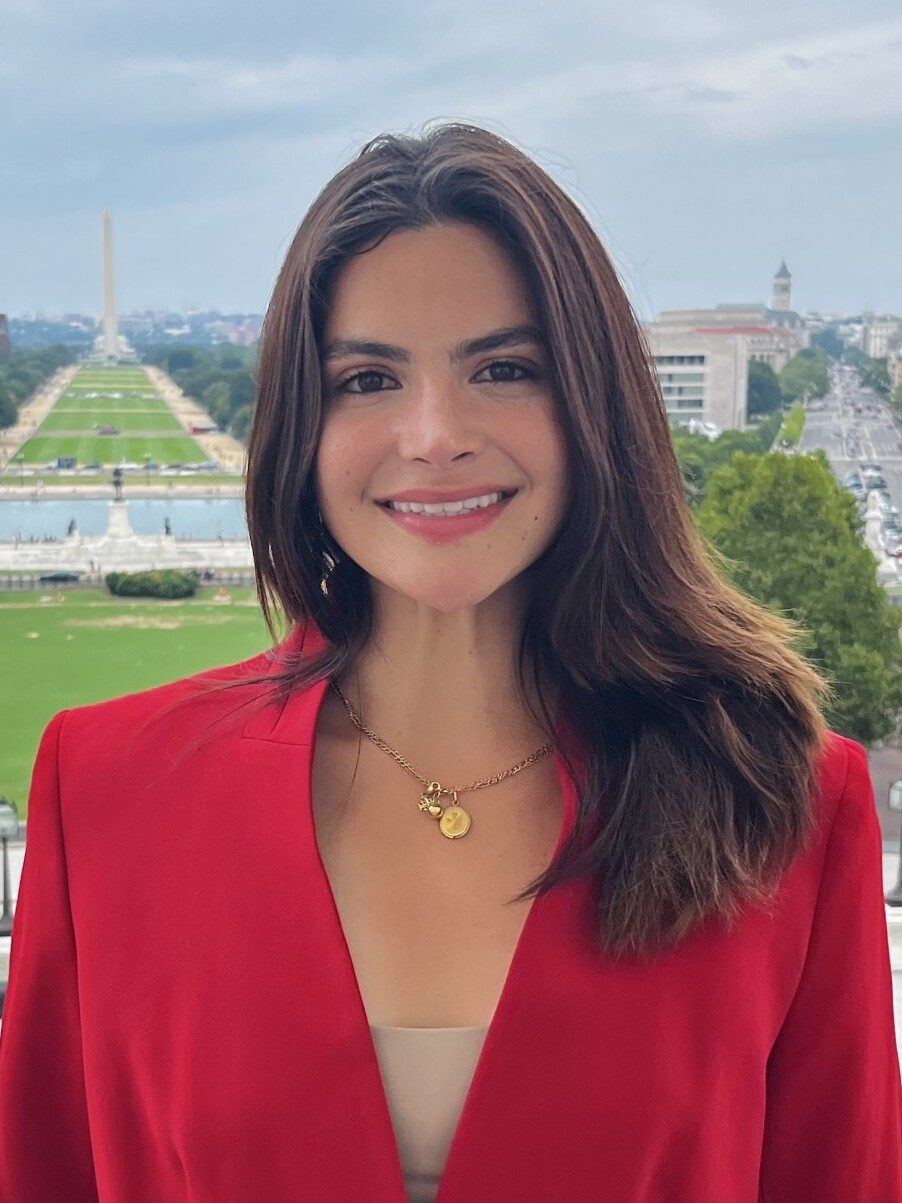
- Gomez in 2025
- Born: Valentina Noriega Gomez; May 8, 1999 (age 27); Medellín, Colombia
- Education: Central Connecticut State University (BS); Tulane University (MBA)
- Occupation: Political activist
- Political party: Republican
- Relatives: Jonathan Gómez (brother)
- Website: valentinaforcongress.com

Valentina Noriega Gomez (born May 8, 1999) is a Colombian-American far-right political activist and Republican Party candidate. Her stances have been described as homophobic, Islamophobic, and anti-immigration. She has received backlash after she posted a video of herself burning the Quran.

Born in Colombia, Gomez moved to New Jersey at the age of ten. She attended Central Connecticut State University before completing an MBA at Freeman School of Business.

Gomez ran unsuccessfully for Missouri Secretary of State in 2024 and the United States House of Representatives in 2026.

== Early life and education ==
Gomez was born on May 8, 1999, in Medellín, Colombia. Gomez immigrated to the United States with her family in 2009 when she was 10, where they settled in Jersey City, New Jersey.

Gomez completed a bachelor's degree from Central Connecticut State University in 2019 and a Master of Business Administration from Tulane University's A.B. Freeman School of Business in 2021.

== Political activism ==
In February 2024, while standing as a Republican candidate for Missouri Secretary of State, Gomez drew widespread attention after setting LGBTQ-friendly library books on fire with a flamethrower. Gomez finished sixth in the election, receiving 7.4% of the vote.

In December 2024, Gomez released a video showing the simulated execution of an immigrant and called for the public execution of undocumented immigrants accused of violent crimes. The League of United Latin American Citizens (LULAC), a Latino Civil Rights organization, published a statement denouncing Gomez and said: "Gomez's video glorifies the type of vigilantism that has led to deadly consequences in our nation and feeds into the anti-immigrant lie." The Texas director of LULAC, Gabriel Rosales, said: "The El Paso Walmart mass shooter killed 23 people and wounded 22 more precisely because of racial hate speech. Social media must ban this kind of reckless display for attention."

In April 2025, Gomez interrupted a Muslim community day held at the Texas Capitol building. She said that "Islam is the religion of rape, incest and pedophilia," and mocked the religion.

In August 2025, Gomez was banned from several social media platforms after burning the Quran in a video posted online. Her brother, Jonathan Gomez-Noriega, worked for the Jersey City LGBTQ+ Task Force until August 5, 2024, when he resigned and distanced himself from his sister's views. Jonathan had donated to Valentina's election campaign. The mayor, Steven Fulop, dismissed Gomez-Noriega as an aide the same day.

In September 2025, Gomez spoke at the Unite the Kingdom rally and said that the UK was being taken over by "rapist Muslims".

In March 2026, Gomez ran unsuccessfully in the Republican primary for Texas's 31st Congressional District, finishing second with 10.9% of the vote. During her candidacy, the Bell County, Texas Elections Office suspended her voter registration, making her ineligible to vote in Elections in Texas due to her registering at a P.O. Box address as her residence as she was not formally registered through the state’s address confidentiality program.

In April 2026, Gomez was barred from visiting the United Kingdom after the Home Office determined her presence "would not be conducive to the public good". Prior to being blocked from entering the UK, Gomez had said to Prime Minister Keir Starmer: "You're only good at protecting the Muslim rape gangs. Try to arrest me & see what happens." Following the ban, Gomez suggested that she would attempt to enter the UK on a small boat.
