= Robin Smith (reporter) =

Saint Louis (reporter)

- Born: Saint Louis, Missouri, U.S.
- Occupations: News Anchor(1974 - 2015); News Reporter (1974 - 2015); Politician - Democratic Party Candidate and Nominee - Missouri; Communications and Political Strategist (2016 - Present)
- Years active: 1974 - Present
- Spouses: Ashok Patel (m. 2005 - 2011); Isaac “Bud” Stallworth(m. 2013 - Present)

Robin Smith is an African-American television news anchor and reporter in Saint Louis, Missouri.

Her news career began in 1974 and lasted until her retirement in 2015. Smith has won 4 Emmy Awards, including one for Best Anchor and she was inducted into the Silver Circle - all awarded by the National Academy of Television Arts and Sciences (NATAS) Mid-America Chapter. Smith has anchored for CBS Television Network on KMOX-TV (now KMOV-TV), KSD-TV (now KSDK-TV) an NBC affiliate, and KTVI-TV (an ABC Network affiliate at the time).

== Early life and education ==
Smith is from Saint Louis, Missouri. She is the daughter of Wayman F. Smith Jr. and Edythe M. Smith. She has two siblings, including older brother Wayman F. Smith III.

Smith graduated from Lindenwood College with a B.A. in Communications Arts and Psychology. She also holds a graduate degree in Business, an Executive Masters in International Business (EMIB) from the John Cook school of Business and Administration at Saint Louis University.

== Career ==
Smith’s television career began at KMOX-TV, a CBS Television Network-owned and operated Channel 4 KMOX-TV station in Saint Louis, Missouri where she interned during the summer of 1973. She worked as an assistant director and producer at that time.

While still in college in June 1974, Smith began her professional TV career as an on- air news interviewer and assistant producer on KSD-TV, an NBC-affiliate in Saint Louis. At the age of 19, Smith was the youngest on air TV personality in St. Louis. She rose to prominence in the mid-1970s on KTVI-TV. She remained there for 3 years as a News Anchor, News Reporter and produced several close-up features, documentaries and investigative reporting.

On June 1, 1978, Smith accepted the offer from CBS Television Network to join their news division -at KMOX-TV Channel 4(now KMOV-TV) in Saint Louis— as a news anchor and reporter. She remained there for 37 years anchoring primetime newscasts at Noon, 5pm, 6pm, and 10pm.

In 2015, Smith retired from her television news career to run for Missouri Secretary of State but lost to Jay Ashcroft.

== Awards ==
Smith is the winner of 4 Emmy Awards including for Best News Anchor, Reporting and was inducted into the Silver Circle of the National Association of Television, Arts and Sciences in 2002. Smith also received the Edward R. Murrow Award for excellence in journalism. She is a founding member of the Saint Louis Association of Black Journalists.
