= 2016 Missouri Senate election =

- November 8, 2016

17 out of 34 seats in the Missouri Senate 18 seats needed for a majority
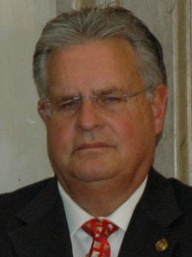

	Majority party	Minority party
Leader	Ron Richard	Gina Walsh
Party	Republican	Democratic
Leader since	September 15, 2015	July 7, 2016
Leader's seat	32nd District	13th District
Last election	25	9
Seats after	25	9
Seat change	Steady	Steady
Popular vote	686,183	527,527
Percentage	56.41%	43.37%
President pro tempore before election
Ron Richard
Republican
Elected President pro tempore
Ron Richard
Republican

The 2016 Missouri Senate election was held on November 8, 2016, to determine which party would control the Missouri Senate for the following two years in the 99th Missouri General Assembly. All odd-numbered seats were up for election, which consisted of half of the 34 senate seats, as well as a special election for the 4th District following incumbent's Joseph Keaveny resignation after having been appointed administrative law judge at the Department of Labor on July 7, 2016. The primary was held on August 2, 2016. Prior to the election 25 seats were held by Republicans and 9 were held by Democrats. The general election saw both parties holding on to the same amount of seats as the previous election, meaning that Republicans retained control of the Missouri Senate.

== Predictions ==
Source	Ranking	As of
Governing	Likely R	October 12, 2016

== Retirements ==
1. 15th District: Eric Schmitt (R) was term-limited.
2. 19th District: Kurt Schaefer (R) was term-limited.
3. 21st District: David Pearce (R) was term-limited.

== Closest races ==
Seats where the margin of victory was under 10%:

1. District 19, 2.44%
2. District 11, 4.34%
3. District 1, 6.18%

== 4th District Special election ==
4th District special election, 2016
Party	Candidate	Votes	%
Democratic	Jacob W. Hummel	57,288	70.73%
Republican	Bryan Young	20,686	25.54%
Libertarian	Michael G. Lewis	3,019	3.73%
Total votes		80,993	100.00%
Democratic hold			

== Results ==
=== 1st District ===
1st District election, 2016
Party	Candidate	Votes	%
Democratic	Scott Sifton (incumbent)	48,926	53.09%
Republican	Randy Jotte	43,227	46.91%
Total votes		92,153	100.0%
Democratic hold			

=== 3rd District ===
3rd District election, 2016
Party	Candidate	Votes	%
Republican	Gary Romine (incumbent)	54,414	81.25%
Green	Edward R. Weissler	12,555	18.75%
Total votes		66,969	100.0%
Republican hold			

=== 5th District ===
5th District election, 2016
Party	Candidate	Votes	%
Democratic	Jamilah Nasheed (incumbent)	53,339	85.30%
Libertarian	Stephen O. Schaper	9,195	14.70%
Total votes		62,534	100.0%
Democratic hold			

=== 7th District ===
7th District election, 2016
Party	Candidate	Votes	%
Democratic	Jason Holsman (incumbent)	60,759	79.23%
Libertarian	Jeanne Bojarski	15,931	20.77%
Total votes		76,690	100.0%
Democratic hold			

=== 9th District ===
9th District election, 2016
Party	Candidate	Votes	%
Democratic	Shalonn Curls (incumbent)	55,506	100.0%
Total votes		55,506	100.0%
Democratic hold			

=== 11th District ===
11th District election, 2016
Party	Candidate	Votes	%
Democratic	John Rizzo	33,071	52.17%
Republican	Brent Thurston Lasater	30,318	47.83%
Total votes		63,389	100.0%
Democratic hold			

=== 13th District ===
13th District election, 2016
Party	Candidate	Votes	%
Democratic	Gina Walsh (incumbent)	66,400	100.0%
Total votes		66,400	100.0%
Democratic hold			

=== 15th District ===
15th District election, 2016
Party	Candidate	Votes	%
Republican	Andrew Koenig	62,988	61.05%
Democratic	Stephen Eagleton	40,193	38.95%
Total votes		103,181	100.0%
Republican hold			

=== 17th District ===
17th District election, 2016
Party	Candidate	Votes	%
Republican	Ryan Silvey (incumbent)	51,262	61.26%
Democratic	J. Ranen Bechthold	32,422	38.74%
Total votes		83,684	100.0%
Republican hold			

=== 19th District ===
19th District election, 2016
Party	Candidate	Votes	%
Republican	Caleb Rowden	45,335	51.22%
Democratic	Stephen Webber	43,179	48.78%
Total votes		88,514	100.0%
Republican hold			

=== 21st District ===
21st District election, 2016
Party	Candidate	Votes	%
Republican	Denny Hoskins	50,288	67.64%
Democratic	ElGene Ver Dught	19,988	26.88%
Libertarian	Bill Wayne	4,077	5.48%
Total votes		74,353	100.0%
Republican hold			

=== 23rd District ===
23rd District election, 2016
Party	Candidate	Votes	%
Republican	Bill Eigel	56,870	60.16%
Democratic	Richard Orr	34,651	36.65%
Libertarian	Bill Slantz	3,014	3.19%
Total votes		94,535	100.0%
Republican hold			

=== 25th District ===
25th District election, 2016
Party	Candidate	Votes	%
Republican	Doug Libla (incumbent)	44,373	69.35%
Democratic	Bill Burlison	19,607	30.65%
Total votes		63,980	100.0%
Republican hold			

=== 27th District ===
27th District election, 2016
Party	Candidate	Votes	%
Republican	Wayne Wallingford (incumbent)	56,750	74.44%
Democratic	Donnie Owens	19,486	25.56%
Total votes		76,236	100.0%
Republican hold			

=== 29th District ===
29th District election, 2016
Party	Candidate	Votes	%
Republican	David Sater (incumbent)	68,542	100.0%
Total votes		68,542	100.0%
Republican hold			

=== 31st District ===
31st District election, 2016
Party	Candidate	Votes	%
Republican	Ed Emery (incumbent)	57,296	72.43%
Independent	Tim Wells	11,798	14.92%
Libertarian	Lora Young	10,007	12.65%
Total votes		79,101	100.0%
Republican hold			

=== 33rd District ===
33rd District election, 2016
Party	Candidate	Votes	%
Republican	Mike Cunningham (incumbent)	64,520	100.0%
Total votes		64,520	100.0%
Republican hold			
