= Tim Van Zandt =

American politician

Member of the Missouri House of Representatives from the 38th district
- In office January 1995 – January 2003
- Preceded by: Karen McCarthy
- Succeeded by: Dan Bishop

Personal details
- Born: September 17, 1963 (age 63) Lexington, Missouri
- Party: Democratic
- Education: University of Central Missouri, University of Missouri–Kansas City, Montgomery College
- Profession: Accountant, nurse

Tim Van Zandt (born September 17, 1963) is a nurse, former accountant and former politician from the U.S. state of Missouri. A Democrat, he served eight years in the Missouri House of Representatives representing Kansas City and became the first openly gay member ever elected to the Missouri General Assembly.

Born in Lexington, Missouri, he graduated from the University of Central Missouri with a B.S.E. in Accounting/Political Science and from the Bloch School at the University of Missouri–Kansas City with an M.P.A. in Health Care Administration. He was the Vice President for Government and Community Relations for Saint Luke's Health System until 2024 when he became Deputy Director of the Missouri Department of Health and Senior Services until he announced his retirement in July of 2026.

He was elected to the Missouri House of Representatives in 1994. In a reliably Democratic district, he won the primary election held on August 2, 1994 with over 80% of the vote. He then faced only a Libertarian opponent in the general election, winning easily and taking office the following January. He was subsequently re-elected in 1996, 1998, and in 2000. Term limits prevented him from seeking re-election in 2002.

In the legislature, Van Zandt chaired the House Tobacco Settlement Committee and vice-chaired the House Committees on Urban Affairs, and Ways and Means.

Van Zandt served as a delegate to the Democratic National Conventions in 1992, 1996 and 2000. He served on the Rules Committee in 1992 and 2000, and the Platform Committee in 1996.

An openly gay man, Van Zandt won the election with the support of the Gay & Lesbian Victory Fund, which channeled thousands of dollars into his campaign. In the 2009–10 biennium, there are three openly gay members of the Missouri General Assembly: Sen. Jolie Justus (D–Kansas City), Rep. Jeanette Mott Oxford (D–St. Louis) and Rep. Mike Colona (D–St. Louis).
