= Bill Emerson =

American politician (1938–1996)

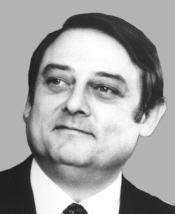

Member of the U.S. House of Representatives from Missouri
- In office January 3, 1981 – June 22, 1996
- Preceded by: William Dean Burlison
- Succeeded by: Jo Ann Emerson
- Constituency: 10th district (1981–1983); 8th district (1983–1996)

Personal details
- Born: January 1, 1938 Saint Louis, Missouri, U.S.
- Died: June 22, 1996 (aged 58) Bethesda, Maryland, U.S.
- Party: Republican
- Spouse(s): Lyn Zwahl Jo Ann Hermann (m. 1975)
- Children: 4

Norvell William Emerson (January 1, 1938 – June 22, 1996) was an American politician. He served as a member of the United States House of Representatives from Missouri from 1981 until his death from lung cancer in Bethesda, Maryland in 1996. He was succeeded in the House by his widow, Jo Ann Emerson. Emerson was a Republican.

== Early life ==
Emerson was raised in Jefferson County, Missouri and attended public schools in nearby Hillsboro. He served as a House Page and graduated from Westminster College in Fulton, Missouri in 1959. Emerson attended law school at the University of Missouri and the University of Baltimore, graduating with his LL.B from Baltimore in 1964. He was also a captain in the United States Air Force Reserve from 1964 to 1992.

== Career ==
He was serving as a congressional page serving on the floor during the 1954 United States Capitol shooting incident involving Puerto Rican terrorists. While in law school, Emerson served as a Congressional aide to U.S. Representative Robert Ellsworth, and after graduation he served on the staff of U.S. Senator Charles Mathias. Throughout the 1970s he worked in governmental affairs for several companies, and formed his own consulting group in 1979. In 1980, he was elected to Congress and was re-elected seven times. Emerson served on the House Committee on Rules.

== Personal life ==
In 1988, after an intervention with his family and friends, Emerson acknowledged his alcoholism and spent a month at the Betty Ford Center. He later helped create the House Employee Assistance Program which provides legislative and administrative support services for the House, later expanded to the Senate, and helps alcoholics find treatment.

Emerson died of lung cancer in 1996. He was succeeded by his widow, Jo Ann Emerson.

== Legacy ==
The Bill Emerson Memorial Bridge, which crosses the Mississippi River at Cape Girardeau, is named after him, as is Emerson Hall, the main assembly room in the House Page School in the Jefferson Building of the Library of Congress and Emerson Hall, an upperclass residence hall at Westminster College in Fulton, Missouri, his alma mater.

The Bill Emerson Good Samaritan Food Donation Act of 1996 was named after the congressman, who fought for the proposal but died of cancer before it was passed. This act encourages the donation of food and grocery products to nonprofit organizations for distribution to needy individuals by protecting donors from liability when donating to a nonprofit organization, so long as the product is donated in "good faith," even if it later causes harm to the needy recipient.

The national Food Security Wheat Reserve (1980–1996), later expanded to the Food Security Commodity Reserve (1996–1998), was renamed the Bill Emerson Humanitarian Trust (1998–) in his memory.

== See also ==
- English Language Unity Act, a bill that was inspired by one of Emerson's bill
- List of members of the United States Congress who died in office (1950–1999)

U.S. House of Representatives
| Preceded by William Dean Burlison | Member of the U.S. House of Representatives from Missouri's 10th congressional district 1981–1983 | Succeeded by District dissolved |
| Preceded by R. Wendell Bailey | Member of the U.S. House of Representatives from Missouri's 8th congressional district 1983–1996 | Succeeded by Jo Ann Emerson |
