= Tom Dempsey (Missouri politician) =

Republican politician in the Missouri Senate

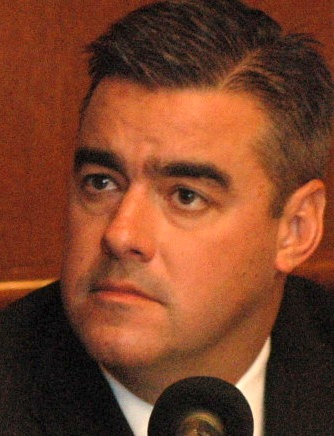

President pro tempore of the Missouri Senate
- In office January 7, 2013 – August 7, 2015
- Preceded by: Robert Mayer
- Succeeded by: Ron Richard

Missouri Senate Majority Whip
- In office January 3, 2009 – January 5, 2011
- Succeeded by: Mike Parson

Member of the Missouri Senate from the 23rd district
- In office September 2007 – July 31, 2015
- Preceded by: Chuck Gross
- Succeeded by: Bill Eigel

Personal details
- Born: Thomas Dwayne Dempsey; May 8, 1967 (age 59) St. Charles, Missouri, U.S.
- Party: Republican
- Spouse: Molly Dempsey
- Children: 3
- Education: Rockhurst University (BS)

Thomas Dwayne Dempsey (born May 8, 1967) is an American restaurateur and former Republican politician, previously serving in the Missouri Senate as President Pro Tempore. Dempsey is now a partner at the Gate Way Group, a multi-state government relations firm based in St. Louis.

== Early life and education ==
He was born in St. Charles, Missouri, and received a B.S. degree from Rockhurst University in political science, where he was a member of Tau Kappa Epsilon fraternity.

== Career and politics ==
Dempsey is the former general manager of The Columns Banquet and Conference Center in St. Charles, Missouri. He is a member of St Cletus Catholic Church and the St. Charles Rotary Club, among others. A former member of the St. Charles City Council. In 2000, he was first elected to the Missouri House of Representatives, winning reelection in 2002, 2004 and 2006. He is the chairman of the Special Committee on Parliamentary Procedure, and also serves as the chair of both the Ethics and Rules committees.

Dempsey was elected to the Senate in a 2007 special election previously serving as Majority Floor Leader in the Missouri House of Representatives. In January 2009, he was elected to Majority Whip of the Senate. In January 2013, Dempsey was elected as President Pro Tem of the Missouri Senate. Dempsey resigned from his Senate seat in August 2015. He is now a partner at the Gate Way Group, a St. Louis based lobbying firm.

== Personal life ==
Dempsey was born to restaurant owner Ernest "Ernie" Dempsey and Peggy Pedrucci, along with younger sisters Anne and Mary. He lives in St. Charles, Missouri, with his wife Molly. They have three children.
