= Senator Childs =

Senator Childs may refer to:

- John Lewis Childs (1856–1921), New York State Senate
- Samuel S. Childs (1863–1961), New Jersey State Senate

== See also ==
- Lawton Chiles (1930–1998), U.S. Senator from Florida from 1971 to 1989
- Senator Childers (disambiguation)
