= Billy Pat Wright =

American politician

Member of the Missouri House of Representatives from the 159th district
- In office 2005–2013
- Preceded by: Rob Mayer
- Succeeded by: Bill Lant

Personal details
- Born: March 17, 1937 (age 89) Rector, Arkansas
- Died: December 8, 2023
- Party: Republican
- Spouse: Linda
- Children: Elaine; Leah; Laura
- Education: National University
- Occupation: real estate agent rancher
- Website: Campaign Website

Billy Pat Wright (born March 17, 1937) is an American, former real estate agent, former rancher, and a former Republican member of the Missouri House of Representatives. He represented the 159th district, which includes parts of Stoddard County, Cape Girardeau County, and Wayne County, from 2005 to 2013. He announced his intention to run for state senate in the 25th district in 2012 in February 2011 only to drop out of the race in May 2012.

== Early life and career ==
Billy Pat Wright was born in Rector, Arkansas in 1937. He attended Marmaduke High School in Marmaduke, Arkansas. He then went to National University and received his B.A. He also attended Three Rivers Community College. He later became a Southwestern Bell Telephone Company real estate agent and rancher. In addition, he is a U.S. Army veteran. During his career he received the Paul Harris Fellow Award from the Dexter Rotary Club and he was the president of the Cotton Club of the Telephone Pioneers of America. He has also been legislative chair of the Communications Workers of America and president of the Dexter Rotary Club. He is a member of the Church of Christ, the American-International Charolais Association, the Masonic Lodge, and the Missouri Cattlemen's Association. He is married with three children and nine grand children.

== Political career ==
Billy Pat Wright first ran for the Missouri House of Representatives in 2004. The 159th district had become open when term limits prevented Rob Mayer from running for reelection. Wright defeated Jerry Elder and Don Stephens in the Republican primary and then went on to defeat Boyce Wooley in the general election. Two years later Wright beat Boyce Wooley again and this time he beat him by a greater margin. In 2008 and 2010, Wright won re-election against Bill Burlison, a former U.S. Representative. In February 2011, Billy Pat Wright decided to run for the 25th district in the Missouri Senate. It was an open seat because Rob Mayer is unable to run for re-election due to term limits. He decided in May 2012 to retire instead of running for the seat. On November 6, Dennis Fowler was elected to the position.

== Electoral history ==
2010 General Election for Missouri’s 159th District House of Representatives
Party	Candidate	Votes	%	±%
Republican	Billy Pat Wright	8,847	70.3	
Democratic	Bill Burlison	3,741	29.7	

2008 General Election for Missouri’s 159th District House of Representatives
Party	Candidate	Votes	%	±%
Republican	Billy Pat Wright	10,179	61.8	
Democratic	Bill Burlison	6,283	38.2	

2006 General Election for Missouri’s 159th District House of Representatives
Party	Candidate	Votes	%	±%
Republican	Billy Pat Wright	7,230	56.7	
Democratic	Boyce Wooley	5,512	43.3	

2004 General Election for Missouri’s 159th District House of Representatives
Party	Candidate	Votes	%	±%
Republican	Billy Pat Wright	8,518	55.0	
Democratic	Boyce Wooley	6,978	45.0	
