= Missouri's 29th Senate district =

American legislative district

Missouri's 29th State Senate district
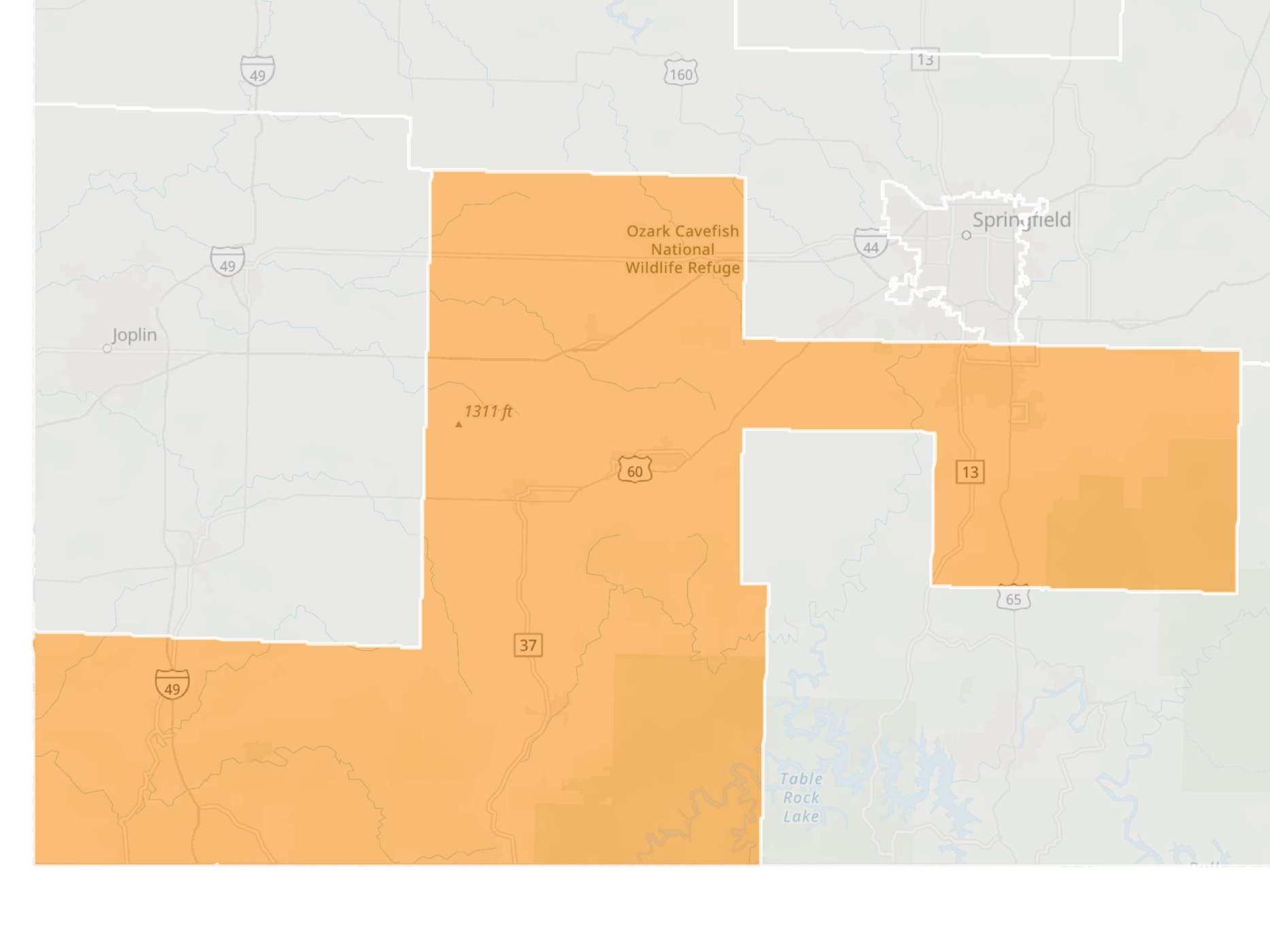
Senator
Mike Moon; R–Ash Grove
- Demographics: 85% White; 1% Black; 7% Hispanic; 1% Asian; 1% Hawaiian/Pacific Islander; 5% Multiracial
- Population (2023): 187,944

Missouri's 29th Senatorial District is one of 34 districts in the Missouri Senate. The district has been represented by Republican Mike Moon since 2021.

== Geography ==
The district is based in southwest Missouri and includes all of Barry, Lawrence, McDonald, and Christian counties. Major municipalities in the district include Monett, Mount Vernon, Nixa, and Ozark. The district is also home to Bluff Dwellers Cave, Busiek State Forest, and Roaring River State Park.

== Election results (1996–2024) ==
=== 1996 ===
Missouri's 29th Senatorial District election (1996)
Party	Candidate	Votes	%
Republican	Doyle Childers	44,767	60.24
Democratic	D.J. Gross	29,546	39.76
Total votes		74,313	100.00
Republican hold			

=== 2000 ===
Missouri's 29th Senatorial District election (2000)
Party	Candidate	Votes	%
Republican	Doyle Childers (incumbent)	67,577	100.00
Total votes		67,577	100.00
Republican hold			

=== 2004 ===
Missouri's 29th Senatorial District election (2004)
Party	Candidate	Votes	%
Republican	Larry Gene Taylor	51,209	69.35
Democratic	Randall Vaught	22,629	30.65
Total votes		73,838	100.00
Republican hold			

=== 2005 ===
Missouri's 29th Senatorial District special election (2005)
Party	Candidate	Votes	%
Republican	Jack Goodman	13,817	65.82
Democratic	Nolan G. McNeill	6,397	30.47
Libertarian	Robert E. Hempker	779	3.71
Total votes		20,993	100.00
Republican hold			

=== 2008 ===
Missouri's 29th Senatorial District election (2008)
Party	Candidate	Votes	%
Republican	Jack Goodman (incumbent)	67,612	100.00
Total votes		67,612	100.00
Republican hold			

=== 2012 ===
Missouri's 29th Senatorial District election (2012)
Party	Candidate	Votes	%
Republican	David Sater	64,011	100.00
Total votes		64,011	100.00
Republican hold			

=== 2016 ===
Missouri's 29th Senatorial District election (2016)
Party	Candidate	Votes	%
Republican	David Sater (incumbent)	68,542	100.00
Total votes		68,542	100.00
Republican hold			

=== 2020 ===
Missouri's 29th Senatorial District election (2020)
Party	Candidate	Votes	%
Republican	Mike Moon	75,582	100.00
Total votes		75,582	100.00
Republican hold			

=== 2024 ===
Missouri's 29th Senatorial District election (2024)
Party	Candidate	Votes	%
Republican	Mike Moon (incumbent)	73,685	80.08
Democratic	Ron Monnig	18,326	19.92
Total votes		92,011	100.00
Republican hold			

== Statewide election results ==
Year	Office	Results
2008	President	McCain 66.9 – 31.0%
2012	President	Romney 74.0 – 26.0%
2016	President	Trump 76.7 – 19.1%
2016	Senate	Blunt 68.1 – 27.0%
2016	Governor	Greitens 69.2 – 27.3%
2018	Senate	Hawley 71.8 – 24.7%
2020	President	Trump 77.5 – 21.0%
2020	Governor	Parson 77.2 – 20.6%
