= Senator Goodman =

Senator Goodman may refer to:

- David Goodman (politician) (born 1967), Ohio State Senate
- Jack Goodman (born 1973), Missouri State Senate
- Roy M. Goodman (1930–2014), New York State Senate
