= Senator Gross =

Senator Gross may refer to:

- Chuck Gross (born 1958), Missouri State Senate
- Jacob A. Gross (1842–1887), New York State Senate
- Jen Gross (fl. 2010s), Montana State Senate
- Samuel Gross (politician) (1776–1839), Pennsylvania

== See also ==
- William Grose (1812–1900), Indiana State Senate
