= Missouri's 33rd Senate district =

American legislative district

Missouri's 33rd State Senate district
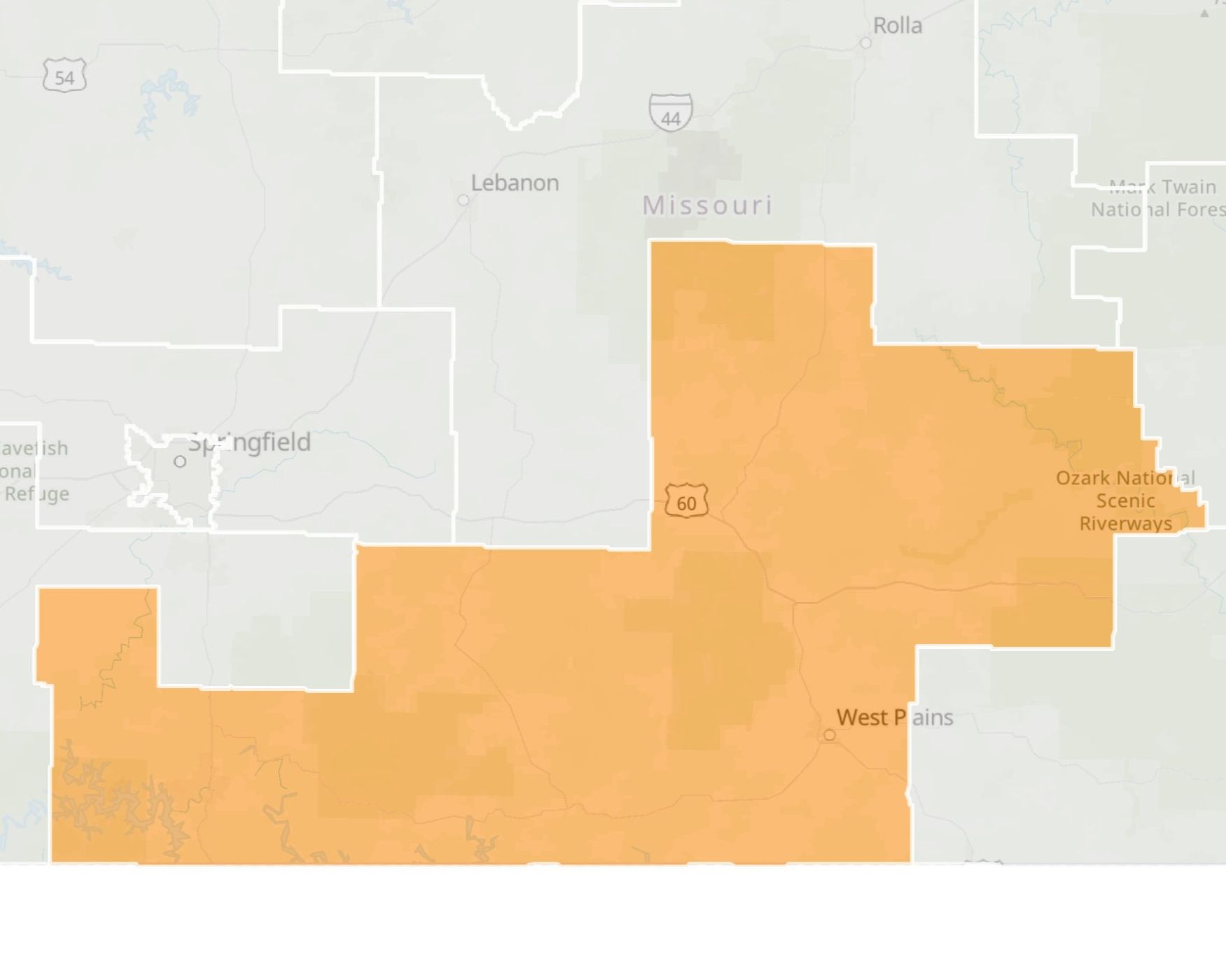
Senator
Brad Hudson; R–Cape Fair
- Demographics: 90% White; 1% Black; 4% Hispanic; 1% Asian; 4% Multiracial
- Population (2023): 180,963

Missouri's 33rd Senatorial District is one of 34 districts in the Missouri Senate. The district has been represented by Republican Brad Hudson since 2025.

== Geography ==
The district is based in southwest Missouri on the Ozark Plateau and includes the counties of Douglas, Howell, Ozark, Shannon, Stone, Taney, and Texas. Major cities in the district include Ava, Branson, Houston, Kimberling City, Mountain View, and Willow Springs. The district is also home to the Branson Landing, Dolly Parton's Stampede, Silver Dollar City, and Table Rock Lake.

== Election results (1996–2024) ==
=== 1996 ===
Missouri's 33rd Senatorial District election (1996)
Party	Candidate	Votes	%
Independent	John T. Russell	38,042	67.48
Democratic	Clifford Keith (incumbent)	18,333	32.52
Total votes		56,375	100.00
Independent gain from Democratic			

=== 2000 ===
Missouri's 33rd Senatorial District election (2000)
Party	Candidate	Votes	%
Republican	John T. Russell (incumbent)	40,668	62.06
Democratic	Clara R. Ichord	24,862	37.94
Total votes		65,530	100.00
Republican hold			

=== 2004 ===
Missouri's 33rd Senatorial District election (2004)
Party	Candidate	Votes	%
Republican	Chuck Purgason	49,396	64.77
Democratic	R.A. Pendergrass	26,868	35.23
Total votes		76,264	100.00
Republican hold			

=== 2008 ===
Missouri's 33rd Senatorial District election (2008)
Party	Candidate	Votes	%
Republican	Chuck Purgason (incumbent)	53,529	67.31
Democratic	Eric Reeve	25,997	32.69
Total votes		79,526	100.00
Republican hold			

=== 2012 ===
Missouri's 33rd Senatorial District election (2012)
Party	Candidate	Votes	%
Republican	Mike Cunningham	59,859	100.00
Total votes		59,859	100.00
Republican hold			

=== 2016 ===
Missouri's 33rd Senatorial District election (2016)
Party	Candidate	Votes	%
Republican	Mike Cunningham (incumbent)	64,520	100.00
Total votes		64,520	100.00
Republican hold			

=== 2020 ===
Missouri's 33rd Senatorial District election (2020)
Party	Candidate	Votes	%
Republican	Karla Eslinger	64,891	83.81
Democratic	Tammy Harty	12,533	16.19
Total votes		77,424	100.00
Republican hold			

=== 2024 ===
Missouri's 33rd Senatorial District election (2024)
Party	Candidate	Votes	%
Republican	Brad Hudson	79,814	100
Total votes		77,424	100.00
Republican hold			

== Statewide election results ==
Year	Office	Results
2008	President	McCain 65.4 – 32.2%
2012	President	Romney 73.3 – 26.7%
2016	President	Trump 79.5 – 17.2%
2016	Senate	Blunt 69.4 – 25.7%
2016	Governor	Greitens 70.6 – 26.0%
2018	Senate	Hawley 74.5 – 22.7%
2020	President	Trump 80.8 – 18.0%
2020	Governor	Parson 79.8 – 18.1%
