= Missouri's 23rd Senate district =

American legislative district

Missouri's 23rd State Senate district
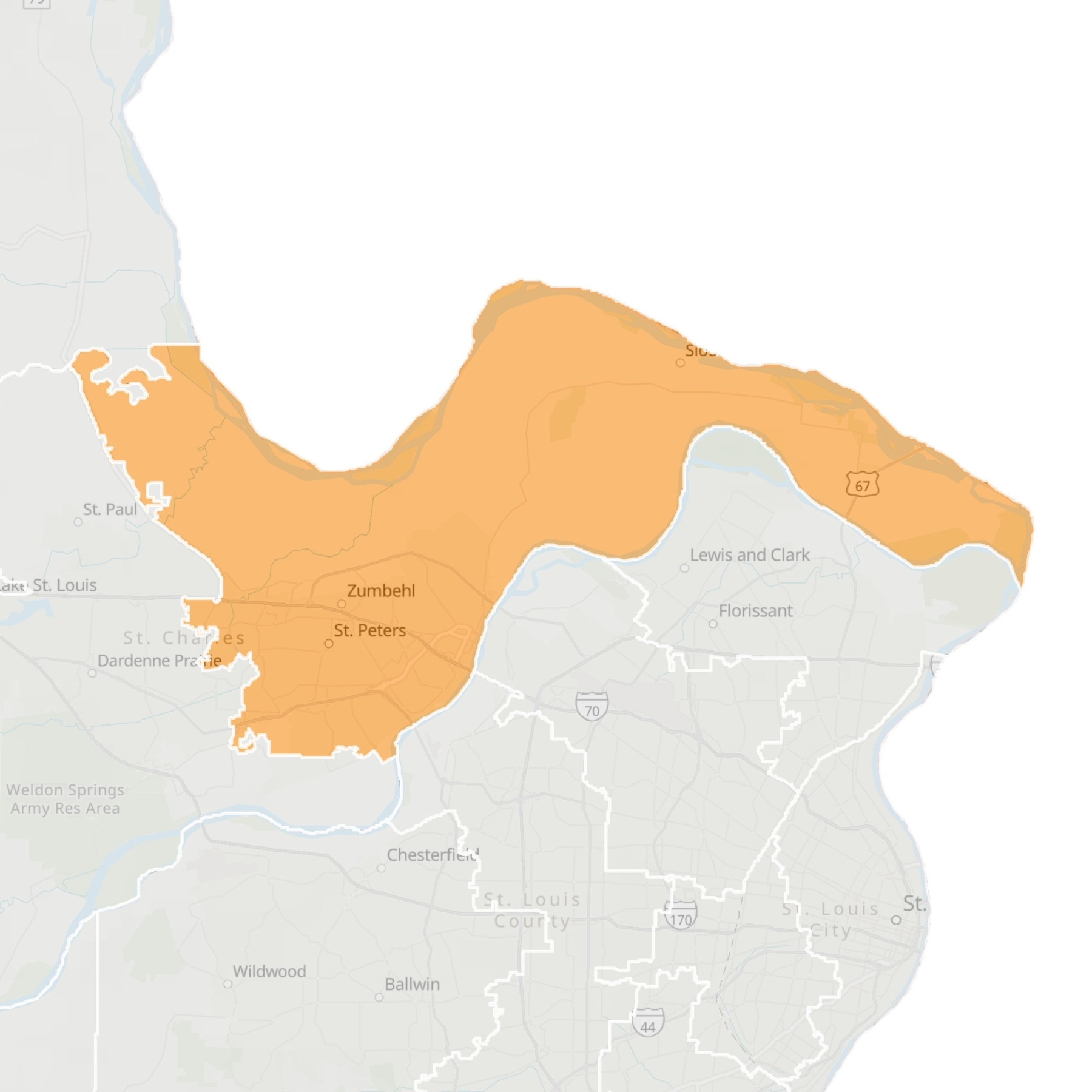
Senator
| Adam Schnelting; R–St. Charles |
- Demographics: 82% White; 6% Black; 5% Hispanic; 3% Asian; 4% Multiracial
- Population (2023): 180,263

Missouri's 23rd Senatorial District is one of 34 districts in the Missouri Senate. The district has been represented by Republican Adam Schnelting since 2025.

== Geography ==
The district is based in eastern St. Charles county within the northern side of the St. Louis metropolitan area, and is situated between the Missouri and Mississippi rivers. Major municipalities in the district include St. Charles and St. Peters. The district is also home to Lindenwood University and several conservation areas for nature and wildlife.

== Election results (1996–2024) ==
=== 1996 ===
Missouri's 23rd Senatorial District election (1996)
| Party | Candidate | Votes | % |
|---|---|---|---|
| Democratic | Tim Harlan | 9,623 | 54.3 |
| Republican | C. Bruce Cornett | 7,587 | 42.8 |
| Libertarian | Gordon Rogers | 506 | 2.9 |
| Total votes | | 17,716 | 100.0 |

=== 2000 ===
Missouri's 23rd Senatorial District election (2000)
| Party | Candidate | Votes | % |
|---|---|---|---|
| Republican | Chuck Gross | 45,838 | 54.3 |
| Democratic | Don R. Kissell | 38,642 | 45.7 |
| Total votes | | 84,480 | 100.0 |
| Republican gain from Democratic | | | |

=== 2004 ===
Missouri's 23rd Senatorial District election (2004)
| Party | Candidate | Votes | % |
|---|---|---|---|
| Republican | Chuck Gross (incumbent) | 46,180 | 58.0 |
| Democratic | Mindy Primm | 33,492 | 42.0 |
| Total votes | | 79,672 | 100.0 |
| Republican hold | | | |

=== 2008 ===
Missouri's 23rd Senatorial District election (2008)
| Party | Candidate | Votes | % |
|---|---|---|---|
| Republican | Tom Dempsey | 50,821 | 60.2 |
| Democratic | Larry Willis | 33,613 | 39.8 |
| Total votes | | 84,434 | 100.0 |
| Republican hold | | | |

=== 2012 ===
Missouri's 23rd Senatorial District election (2012)
| Party | Candidate | Votes | % |
|---|---|---|---|
| Republican | Tom Dempsey (incumbent) | 72,310 | 100.0 |
| Total votes | | 72,310 | 100.0 |
| Republican hold | | | |

=== 2016 ===
Missouri's 23rd Senatorial District election (2016)
| Party | Candidate | Votes | % |
|---|---|---|---|
| Republican | Bill Eigel | 56,870 | 60.2 |
| Democratic | Richard Orr | 34,651 | 36.7 |
| Libertarian | Bill Slantz | 3,014 | 3.2 |
| Total votes | | 94,535 | 100.00 |
| Republican hold | | | |

=== 2020 ===
Missouri's 23rd Senatorial District election (2020)
| Party | Candidate | Votes | % |
|---|---|---|---|
| Republican | Bill Eigel (incumbent) | 57,988 | 57.2 |
| Democratic | Richard Orr | 43,306 | 42.8 |
| Total votes | | 101,294 | 100.0 |
| Republican hold | | | |

=== 2024 ===
Missouri's 23rd Senatorial District election (2024)
| Party | Candidate | Votes | % |
|---|---|---|---|
| Republican | Adam Schnelting | 51,308 | 55.09 |
| Democratic | Matt Williams | 41,822 | 44.91 |
| Total votes | | 93,130 | 100.00 |
| Republican hold | | | |

== Statewide election results ==
| Year | Office | Results |
|---|---|---|
| 2008 | President | McCain 51.4 – 47.4% |
| 2012 | President | Romney 57.0 – 43.0% |
| 2016 | President | Trump 56.5 – 37.7% |
| 2016 | Senate | Blunt 48.0 – 47.3% |
| 2016 | Governor | Greitens 51.0 – 45.8% |
| 2018 | Senate | Hawley 48.9 – 48.0% |
| 2020 | President | Trump 53.1 – 44.8% |
| 2020 | Governor | Parson 53.6 – 44.2% |
