= Wanda Brown =

Wanda Brown may refer to:

- Wanda Brown (politician) (born 1966), American politician, member of the Missouri House of Representatives
- Wanda Kay Brown, American librarian
- Wanda Brown Shaw (1899–1942), née Brown, American clubwoman and teacher
