= Missouri's 4th Senate district =

American legislative district

Missouri's 4th State Senate district
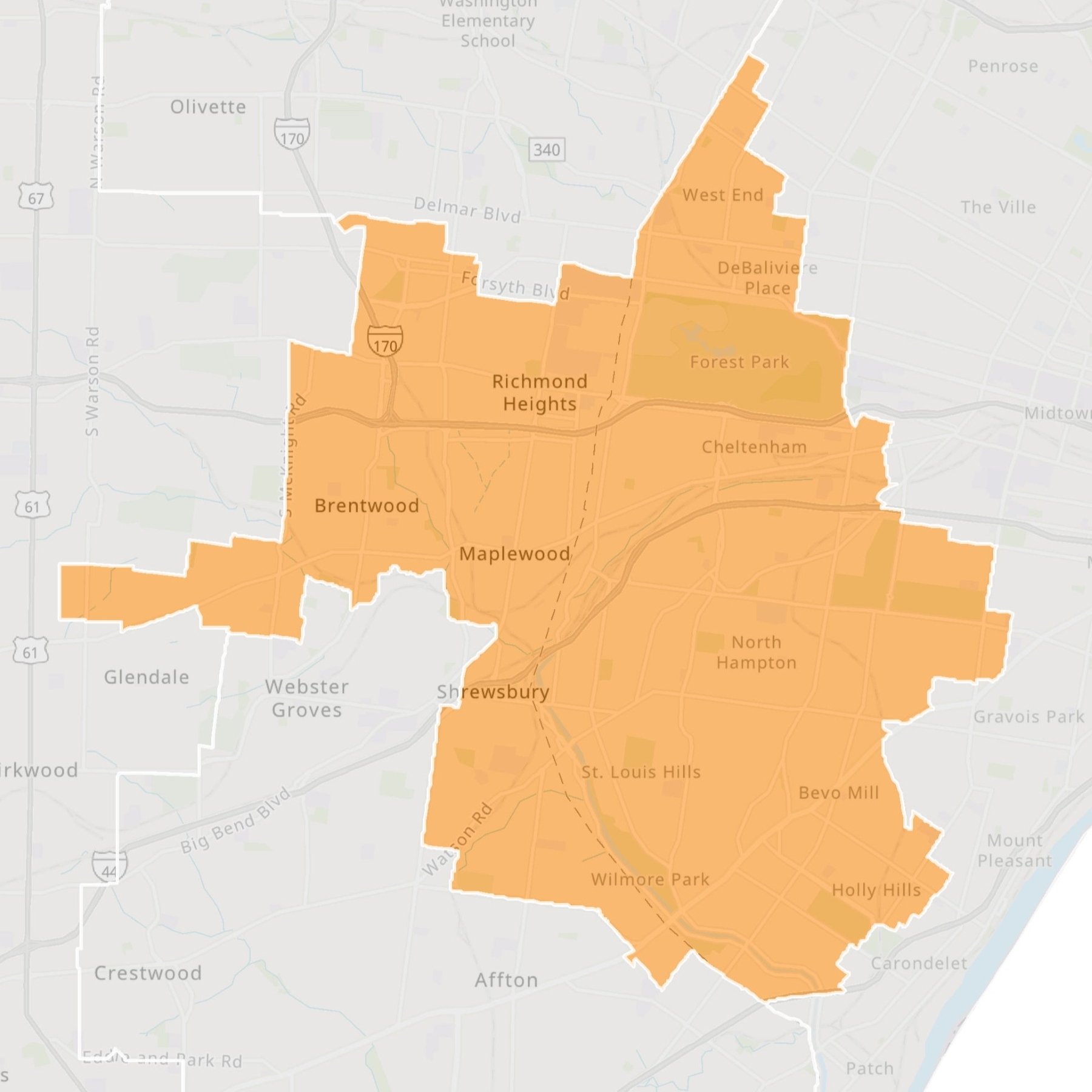
Senator
Karla May; D–St. Louis
- Demographics: 69% White; 16% Black; 5% Hispanic; 5% Asian; 5% Multiracial
- Population (2023): 180,282

Missouri's 4th Senatorial District is one of 34 districts in the Missouri Senate. The district has been represented by Democrat Karla May since 2019.

== Geography ==
The district is based in western St. Louis city and a portion of eastern St. Louis County. Other major municipalities in the district include Clayton, Maplewood, Richmond Heights, and Shrewsbury. The district is also home to Forest Park, the Missouri Botanical Garden, the Saint Louis Zoo, and Washington University in St. Louis.

== 2026 candidates ==
=== Democratic primary ===
- Steve Butz, representative of Missouri House District 81
- Chris Clark, attorney
- Gina Mitten, former representative of Missouri House District 83

== Election results (1998–2022) ==
=== 1998 ===
Missouri's 4th Senatorial District election (1998)
Party	Candidate	Votes	%
Democratic	William Lacy Clay Jr.	22,041	78.7
Republican	Z. Dwight Billingsly	4,808	17.2
Libertarian	David Westphal	1,169	4.2
Total votes		28,018	100.0

=== 2002 ===
Missouri's 4th Senatorial District election (2002)
Party	Candidate	Votes	%
Democratic	Pat Dougherty	41,580	100.0
Total votes		41,580	100.0
Democratic hold			

=== 2006 ===
Missouri's 4th Senatorial District election (2006)
Party	Candidate	Votes	%
Democratic	Jeff Smith	40,966	100.0
Total votes		40,966	100.0
Democratic hold			

=== 2010 ===
Missouri's 4th Senatorial District election (2010)
Party	Candidate	Votes	%
Democratic	Joseph Keaveny	35,663	84.6
Independent	Nick P. Gartelos	6,512	15.4
Total votes		42,175	100.0
Democratic hold			

=== 2014 ===
Missouri's 4th Senatorial District election (2014)
Party	Candidate	Votes	%
Democratic	Joseph Keaveny (incumbent)	29,041	72.2
Republican	Courtney Blunt	11,206	27.8
Total votes		40,247	100.0
Democratic hold			

=== 2016 ===
Missouri's 4th Senatorial District special election (2016)
Party	Candidate	Votes	%
Democratic	Jacob W. Hummel	57,288	70.73
Republican	Bryan Young	20,686	25.54
Libertarian	Michael G. Lewis	3,019	3.73
Total votes		80,993	100.00
Democratic hold			

=== 2018 ===
Missouri's 4th Senatorial District election (2018)
Party	Candidate	Votes	%
Democratic	Karla May	56,883	77.1
Republican	Robert J. Crump	16,927	22.9
Total votes		73,810	100.0
Democratic hold			

=== 2022 ===
Missouri's 4th Senatorial District election (2022)
Party	Candidate	Votes	%
Democratic	Karla May (incumbent)	51,419	74.2
Republican	Mary Theresa McLean	17,906	25.8
Total votes		69,325	100.0
Democratic hold			

== Statewide election results ==
Year	Office	Results
2008	President	Obama 68.7 – 30.0%
2012	President	Obama 66.9 – 33.1%
2016	President	Clinton 67.0 – 27.2%
2016	Senate	Kander 70.6 – 25.8%
2016	Governor	Koster 69.0 – 27.7%
2018	Senate	McCaskill 74.1 – 23.6%
2020	President	Biden 73.2 – 25.0%
2020	Governor	Galloway 71.4 – 26.8%
