= Mike Moon (politician) =

American politician (born 1958)

Member of the Missouri Senate from the 29th district
- Incumbent
- Assumed office January 6, 2021
- Preceded by: David Sater

Member of the Missouri House of Representatives from the 157th District
- In office January 9, 2013 – January 6, 2021
- Preceded by: Don Ruzicka
- Succeeded by: Mitch Boggs

Personal details
- Born: December 31, 1958 (age 67) Kannapolis, North Carolina, U.S.
- Party: Republican
- Spouse: Denise Moon
- Children: 5
- Education: Baptist Bible College; Missouri State University (BS)

Mike Moon (born December 31, 1958) is an American politician serving as a member of the Missouri Senate, who previously served in the Missouri House of Representatives. He is a member of the Republican Party.

Moon is an advocate for child marriage and has praised the low divorce rate among 12 year old married couples but was recently unsuccessful in preventing the passing of a ban within his state. He is against abortion and has introduced legislation to define a human zygote as a person. He supports children being able to marry other children with parental consent as an alternative to abortion. He opposes mandatory sex education in schools, and proposed bills banning the discussion of LGBTQ people in public schools and prohibiting doctors from providing gender affirming care to minors. Moon is against mandatory masking and regulation of businesses as a tool to mitigate COVID-19, and wants to eliminate corporate taxation.

== Political career ==
Moon ran for Missouri's 7th congressional district against former US Rep. Billy Long in 2010 and 2012, and primaried for Long's vacated seat in the 2022 US House of Representatives elections. After running for Congress in 2012, Mike Moon served the 157th District in the Missouri House of Representatives from 2013 to 2020. In 2020, he was elected to represent the 29th District in the Missouri Senate, and in 2024, he was re-elected to the Missouri Senate.

During his campaign for United States House of Representatives, Moon was temporarily removed from all committee assignments by Senate Republican leader Dave Schatz for wearing overalls on senate floor. Following a filibuster in which he called Schatz a "dictator," Moon apologized and had his appointments returned. In 2025, Moon attempted to block Mike Kehoe's appointment of Schatz to the Franklin County Commission by filibuster in the Missouri Senate.

Moon was a member of the Missouri Senate "conservative caucus" until it disbanded in 2022. The group had openly quarreled with fellow Missouri Republicans in session and were at one point accused of turning a session into a "clown show" by Senate Majority Leader Caleb Rowden. At other times, Republican senators sought procedural measures to reduce the impact of caucus's "glorified publicity stunts" on proceedings.

== Political positions ==
=== Abortion ===
Moon is anti-abortion, citing "putting an end to abortion" in Missouri as one of his top priorities. Prior to its reversal, he did not believe states were obligated to enforce Roe v. Wade (1973), and has introduced several anti-abortion bills during his time as a state representative, including the Never Again Act (which proposed requiring the Missouri State Museum to have an exhibit featuring tools used in abortion), the Right to Due Process Act (which proposed defining a human zygote as a person), and House Bill 2285 (which proposed abolishing abortion in Missouri).

In 2017, Moon posted a video of himself butchering chickens on his family farm on social media, chiding his fellow Missouri legislators for not getting to the "heart of the matter" and abolishing abortion in Missouri outright. The video was negatively received by NARAL Pro-Choice Missouri, as well as PETA president Ingrid Newkirk, the latter of whom called for his arrest. Moon, however, denied that he was trying to offend anyone by the video, saying that "[t]he reality is our food is slaughtered ... I didn't mean for it [the video] to be demoralizing in any way. It was just something that I was in the middle of and I wasn't going to go shower or change clothes."

Moon attempted to insert an anti-abortion provision in a bipartisan bill to extend postpartum care from 60 days to a year. Fellow Republicans argued against the language as similar attempts in other states had jeopardized federal approval and delayed implementation. Governor Mike Parson has called Missouri's high maternal mortality rates "embarrassing and absolutely unacceptable." The bill passed without Moon's provision during his absence, and on his return he blocked all Senate action for a full day as retribution.

In 2025, Moon stepped down from the Families, Seniors and Health Committee rather than accept an exception for survivors of rape or incest on an abortion ban bill filed by Adam Schnelting.

=== Against LGBT education and healthcare ===
Mike Moon has introduced bills allowing parents to not have their children participate in sex education classes, requiring internet service providers to ban "obscene" websites, prohibiting doctors from providing transgender children with gender affirming care or hormonal treatment, and restricting K-12 public school educators from talking about LGBT people.

=== Child marriage ===
When challenged by Rep. Peter Merideth in April 2023 on arguments related to transgender youth, Moon defended his 2018 stance on child marriage in which he opposed legislation that raised the marriage age from 15 to 16, and requires parental consent for older teenagers to marry.

After his comments went viral, Moon claimed he did not have enough time to explain his vote and that he does not support adults marrying children. Moon's argument in defense of child marriage in both 2018 and 2023 are an anecdote about a couple he met in college who married at age 12 as a result of pregnancy and are "still married."

In April 2024 and again in March 2025, Moon cast the sole senate vote against legislation intended to completely ban child marriage in Missouri.

=== Corporate tax ===
Moon wants to eliminate corporate tax, as well as what he deems as "unnecessary regulation".

=== COVID-19 ===
Moon is against face mask mandates and safety measures that regulate businesses to curb the spread of the virus, believing that they threaten personal liberty and "that the economy has been devastated as a result" of them.

=== Environment ===
Moon was among six legislators to sign a letter to the Missouri Fertilizer Control Board to change exemptions that allow fertilization distributors to dump waste without effective restrictions.

=== Religion ===
In 2019, he requested Missouri governor Mike Parson to not allow the replacement of a statue of the Roman goddess Ceres to the top of the Missouri Capitol in Jefferson City, calling the statue a "false god."

== Awards ==
The Locke & Smith Foundation Granite Plaque
Year	Chamber Served
2017	Missouri House of Representatives
2018	Missouri House of Representatives
2019	Missouri House of Representatives
2023	Missouri Senate
2024	Missouri Senate
2025	Missouri Senate

== Electoral history ==
=== State representative ===
Missouri House of Representatives Primary Election, August 5, 2014, District 157
Party	Candidate	Votes	%	±%
Republican	Mike Moon	3,308	55.10%	
Republican	Julie Ruzicka	2,696	44.90%	

Missouri House of Representatives Election, November 4, 2014, District 157
Party	Candidate	Votes	%	±%
Republican	Mike Moon	6,407	76.11%	−23.89
Democratic	Vince Jennings	2,011	23.89%	+23.89

Missouri House of Representatives Election, November 8, 2016, District 157
Party	Candidate	Votes	%	±%
Republican	Mike Moon	11,632	74.17%	−1.94
Independent	Stephanie Davis	4,050	25.83%	

Missouri House of Representatives Election, November 6, 2018, District 157
Party	Candidate	Votes	%	±%
Republican	Mike Moon	10,551	78.92%	+4.75
Democratic	Loretta Thomas	2,819	21.08%	

=== State Senate ===
Missouri State Senate Primary Election, August 4, 2020, District 29
Party	Candidate	Votes	%	±%
Republican	Mike Moon	17,761	52.49%	
Republican	David Cole	16,077	47.51%	

Missouri State Senate General Election, November 3, 2020, District 29
Party	Candidate	Votes	%	±%
Republican	Mike Moon	75,402	100%	+47.51%
