= Strategic grain reserve =

A strategic grain reserve is a government stockpile of grain for the purpose of meeting future domestic or international needs. In the United States, such programs have included the Farmer-Owned Grain Reserve (1977–1996), Food Security Wheat Reserve (1980–1996), Food Security Commodity Reserve (1996–1998), and most recently the Bill Emerson Humanitarian Trust (1998–).
