= Jason Bean (politician) =

American politician

Member of the Missouri Senate from the 25th district
- Incumbent
- Assumed office January 5, 2021
- Preceded by: Doug Libla

Personal details
- Party: Republican
- Children: 3
- Education: University of Missouri (BS)

Jason Bean is an American politician and farmer serving as a member of the Missouri Senate from the 25th district. Elected in 2020, he assumed office on January 5, 2021.

== Early life and education ==
Bean was raised in the Missouri Bootheel region. He is a fifth-generation farmer and Missouri native. He earned a Bachelor of Science degree in agronomy and animal science from the University of Missouri.

== Missouri State Senate ==
Bean operated a family farm. He was elected to the Missouri Senate in November 2020, placing first in the Republican primary and running unopposed in the general election. He assumed office on January 5, 2021. He is a self-described constitutional conservative who has frequently discussed "draining the swamp."

In 2021, he serves as the Vice Chairman of the Agriculture, Food Production and Outdoors Resources Committee, and Vice Chairman on the Transportation, Infrastructure and Public Safety

=== Committee assignments ===
- Agriculture, Food Production and Outdoor Resources, Vice-Chairman
- Commerce, Consumer Protection, Energy and the Environment
- Gubernatorial Appointments
- Local Government and Elections
- Transportation, Infrastructure and Public Safety, Vice-Chairman
- Joint Committee on Disaster Preparedness and Awareness
- Joint Committee on Transportation Oversight
- Missouri Commission on the Delta Regional Authority
- Missouri Southern States Energy Board
- Seismic Safety Commission
