= Bill Emerson Humanitarian Trust =

The Bill Emerson Humanitarian Trust (BEHT) is a strategic grain reserve held by the United States for the benefit of other countries. It can contain commodities and cash held in trust to supplement food aid made available under programs created by Public Law 480, the Agricultural Trade Development and Assistance Act of 1954. The Trust can hold up to 4 million metric tons of wheat, corn, sorghum, and rice. Since 2008, the Trust has held no grain, and holds only cash.

The Trust is a successor to the Food Security Wheat Reserve established in 1980 (P.L. 96-494, Title III). Subsequently, the authorization for this reserve was expanded from wheat alone to also include corn, rice, and sorghum by the 1996 farm bill (P.L. 104-127, Sec. 225). Renamed the Bill Emerson Humanitarian Trust in 1998 legislation (P.L. 105-385, Sec. 211) it was also authorized to hold cash in addition to commodities. Commodities (or cash) can be released from the Trust to meet unanticipated needs for emergency food assistance or when domestic supplies are insufficient to meet P.L. 480 (7 U.S.C. 1736f-1) programming requirements.

The trust was established by the Africa: Seeds of Hope Act of 1998. It is named for U.S. Congressman Bill Emerson, who served in the House of Representatives from 1981 until his death in 1996.

In 2008, as global food prices spiked, the remaining commodities (about 915,000 metric tons) were sold. Since then, the trust is solely a cash reserve, invested in low-risk, short-term securities or instruments. The trust allows the U.S. Agency for International Development’s (USAID) Office of Food for Peace (FFP) to respond to food crises in other countries and release and use funds for famine relief in cases where other resources are not available. Since it no longer holds commodities, it can respond to local food crises outside the US, but not to a global one that affects the USA itself. The trust is still active as of 2017.
