= Missouri's 21st Senate district =

American legislative district

Missouri's 21st State Senate district
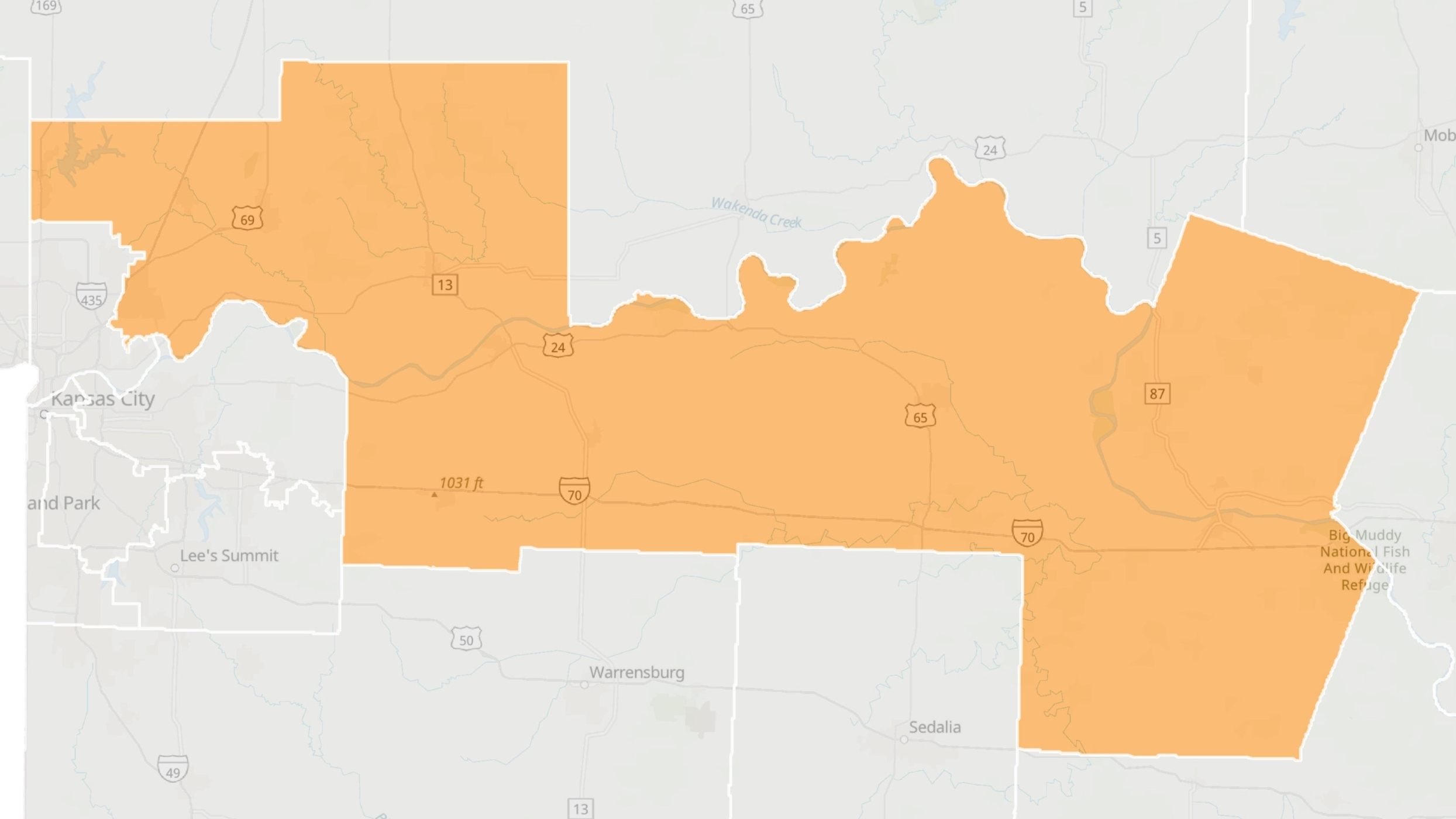
Senator
Kurtis Gregory; R–Marshall
- Demographics: 88% White; 3% Black; 4% Hispanic; 1% Asian; 3% Multiracial
- Population (2023): 184,365

Missouri's 21st Senatorial District is one of 34 districts in the Missouri Senate. The district has been represented by Republican Kurtis Gregory since 2025.

== Geography ==
The district includes northern Clay, Cooper, Howard, Lafayette, Ray, and Saline counties. Major municipalities in the district include Excelsior Springs, Kearney, Liberty, Marshall, and Smithville, stretching between the Kansas City and Columbia metropolitan areas. The district is also home to the Missouri River, Smithville Lake, and Watkins Woolen Mill State Park.

== Election results (1996–2024) ==
=== 1996 ===
Missouri's 21st Senatorial District election (1996)
Party	Candidate	Votes	%
Democratic	James L. Mathewson	34,868	55.1
Republican	Dave Oetting	28,356	44.9
Total votes		63,224	100.0

=== 2000 ===
Missouri's 21st Senatorial District election (2000)
Party	Candidate	Votes	%
Democratic	James L. Mathewson (incumbent)	53,593	100.00
Total votes		53,593	100.00
Democratic hold			

=== 2004 ===
Missouri's 21st Senatorial District election (2004)
Party	Candidate	Votes	%
Republican	Bill Stouffer	38,454	52.0
Democratic	Page Bellamy	35,438	48.0
Total votes		73,892	100.0
Republican gain from Democratic			

=== 2008 ===
Missouri's 21st Senatorial District election (2008)
Party	Candidate	Votes	%
Republican	Bill Stouffer (incumbent)	47,285	64.0
Democratic	Joe Sadeghi	26,643	36.0
Total votes		73,928	100.0
Republican hold			

=== 2012 ===
Missouri's 21st Senatorial District election (2012)
Party	Candidate	Votes	%
Republican	David Pearce	47,490	65.1
Democratic	ElGene Ver Dught	22,073	30.3
Libertarian	Steven Hedrick	3,351	4.6
Total votes		72,914	100.0
Republican hold			

=== 2016 ===
Missouri's 21st Senatorial District election (2016)
Party	Candidate	Votes	%
Republican	Denny Hoskins	50,288	67.6
Democratic	ElGene Ver Dught	19,988	26.9
Libertarian	William Truman Wayne	4,077	5.5
Total votes		74,353	100.0
Republican hold			

=== 2020 ===
Missouri's 21st Senatorial District election (2020)
Party	Candidate	Votes	%
Republican	Denny Hoskins (incumbent)	61,698	79.8
Democratic	Mark Bliss	15,595	20.2
Total votes		77,293	100.0
Republican hold			

=== 2024 ===
Missouri's 21st Senatorial District election (2024)
Party	Candidate	Votes	%
Republican	Kurtis Gregory	64,446	69.32
Democratic	Jim Bates	28,521	30.68
Total votes		92,967	100.00
Republican hold			

== Statewide election results ==
Year	Office	Results
2008	President	McCain 54.3 – 43.5%
2012	President	Romney 60.8 – 39.2%
2016	President	Trump 64.3 – 30.1%
2016	Senate	Blunt 52.4 – 42.3%
2016	Governor	Greitens 55.7 – 40.9%
2018	Senate	Hawley 58.4 – 37.9%
2020	President	Trump 66.4 – 31.7%
2020	Governor	Parson 65.8 – 31.8%
