= List of mayors of Poplar Bluff, Missouri =

The city of Poplar Bluff, Missouri, United States, is the sixth-most populous city in Missouri's 8th congressional district and southeastern Missouri.

The town was started in 1850. The city was incorporated on February 9, 1870.

== List of mayors ==
Mayor	Took office	Left office	Additional information
Joseph T. Davison: (1846-1915)	1883		Ohio-born American Civil war veteran who served in the 68th Illinois Infantry and the 3rd Illinois Cavalry before moving to Poplar Bluff in 1874. He had been a member of the Missouri House of Representatives.
Thomas Hugh Moore: (1846-1899)	1887	1887	In 1896, this general mercantile store operator was appointed Butler County collector by Governor William Stone.
James Robert Hogg: (1863-1934)	1897	1897	Farmer, meat merchant, sheriff, and distillery owner originally from Indiana.
Dr. Alex W. Davidson: (1853-1934)		c.1901	Alex W. Davidson was born 1853 in Hickman County, Tennessee, the eldest of eleven children. He studied medicine under his father and entered the American Medical College of St. Louis, graduating in 1876.
Ed L. Abington: (1867-1955)		c. 1902	He was born in St. Charles County, Missouri. He was president of the Bank of Poplar Bluff around 1949.
John W. Berryman: (c. 1869-1940)	c. 1909	c. 1911	
Robert G. Felts: (1861-1918)			c. 1914
John W. Berryman: (c. 1869-1940)	c. 1917	c. 1919	(He previously served as mayor.)
Edgar G. Hammons: (1881-1938)			c. 1926
John W. Berryman: (c. 1869-1940)		c. 1927	(He previously served as mayor.)
Bayles Kennedy Flannery: (1889-1957)			c. 1929 He was born near Golconda, Illinois.
Dr. Zera Lee Stokely: (1895-1974)			c. 1931 Dentist and postmaster.
Clyde E. Richardson: (1906-1977)		1945	A banker who previously resigned as mayor to join the Army Finance Corps during World War II.
Arch W. Bartlett: (1901-1985)	1945	1946	
Clyde E. Richardson: (1906-1977)	1947	1949	(He previously served as mayor.)
E. W. Robinson: (c.1901-1956)			He died following surgery for a lung tumor.
Arch W. Bartlett: (1901-1985)	1953	1953	(He previously served as mayor.)
E. W. Robinson: (c.1901-1956)	1954	1956	(He previously served as mayor.)
John S. West: (1923-2015)	1957	1963	Former First Sergeant in US Army who served in the Pacific during World War II. Former co-owner of Bluff City Motors.
Walter F. Thies: (1921-2011)			He served as a U.S. Navy fighter pilot during World War II.
Robert L. Odell			U.S. Navy veteran of World War II and the Korean War
J. C. Allen	1963	1967	
Earl C. Porter: (1913-1988)	1967	1970	
Louie N. Snider: (1923-2013)	1970	c. 1971	The first mayor of the present form of city government. Snider served in the Battle of the Bulge under General Patton.
Harold Jackson: (1929-2021)	1971	1972	He owned a car dealership and served in the U.S. Army during the Korean War.
Bernard R. Wheetley: (1919-2003)	1973	1975	Delegate to Republican National Convention from Missouri, 1964.
Paul Henry Hillis: (1921-2016)	1975	1975	Hillis joined the Seabees during World War II. Dean of Three Rivers Community College.
Bill I. Foster: (1946-2025)	1979	1980	Missouri state senator, 2001-2005; Missouri state representative, 1993-2001. Foster also served in the National Guard.
Gerald Lynn Rains: (1947-2019)	1980	1981	Former Butler County Clerk, 1982-1986. He died at his home in Piedmont, Missouri.
Bill Sparks	1981	1982	Sparks served on the planning commission for Russellville, Arkansas, for 17 years.
Thomas F. Allen: (1931-2012)	1983	1984	Assistant Superintendent of Poplar Bluff public schools.
Bruce E. Holloway: (born c. 1952)			
Bill Sparks	1985	1986	(He previously served as mayor.)
Robert P. MacDonald	1987	1988	
Calvin M. Rutledge	1988	1989	Rutledge resigned during a later term to become director of the Black River Coliseum.
Thomas J. Lawson: (born 1932)			Lawson has also served as Poplar Bluff city manager and as chairman of the Highway 67 Corporation Board and the Highway 67 Coalition.
Betty Absheer: (1936-2021)	1993	1994	Betty Absheer was the first woman to serve as Mayor of Poplar Bluff. She was appointed to the City Council in 1989 and subsequently elected to a full term. She retired from the City Council in 2016. Council members elected her to one-year terms as mayor in 1993, 1996, 2000, 2006, and 2015.
Ron Black		1996	
Betty Absheer: (1936-2021)	1996	1997	
Chris Rustin		1998	
Reid Forrester: (born c. 1960)		2000	Poplar Bluff City Council, 1996-2002. In 2005, he was appointed to the Board of Probation and Parole. Chief of Staff to Lieutenant Governor Peter D. Kinder since 2015.
Calvin Rutledge	2000	2000	(He previously served as mayor, 1988-1989.)
Johnny Brannum	2000		
Scott Faughn: (born 1980)	2002	2005	Faughn was elected the city's youngest mayor at age 22.
Loyd Lee Matthews: (1934-2014)			Matthews served 3 years as mayor and 12 years on the city council. He served 4 years in the U.S. Navy around the time of the Korean War.
Betty Absheer: (1936-2021)	2006	2007	
Susan Williams-McVey			c. 2007
Ed DeGaris: (1954-2022)	2011	2014	Retired police lieutenant who was elected to the City Council in 2009.
Angela Pearson: (1983-2016)	2014	2015	The city's youngest female mayor.
Betty Absheer: (1936-2021)	2015	2016	With Councilwoman Angela Pearson absent for health reasons, the city council was deadlocked and unable to elect a mayor. All council members' names were put in a cup, and Ms. Absheer's name was drawn out of the cup by city attorney Robert L. Smith. Thus, she became the mayor for the 2015-2016 term.
Ed DeGaris: (1954-2022)	2016		(He previously served as mayor, 2011-2014.)
Robert Smith	2019	2021	First African-American mayor.
Steve Davis	2021	2023	
Shane Cornman	2023		

== Notable city managers for Poplar Bluff ==
Poplar Bluff adopted the city manager form of government in 1969.

City managers	Took office	Left office	Additional information
David W. Pence	1969	1978	He previously served as city manager for Excelsior Springs, Missouri, and Flat River, Missouri.
Joe A. Michie	1982	1984	He also served as city manager for Lockhart, Texas; New Braunfels, Texas; and Mineral Wells, Texas.
Marion LaVern "Vern" Bechtel	c. 1986	c. 1987	He had previously been the city manager for Hendersonville, North Carolina.
Thomas J. Lawson	c. 1990	c. 2002	He served as city manager for 12 years after retiring in 1988 as the superintendent of the Hazelwood School District.
Doug Bagby	2003	2014	Replaced by interim city manager Mark Massingham.
Heath Kaplan	2014	2015	He served as city manager for 9 months. Replaced by assistant city manager Mark Massingham as interim city manager.
Mark Massingham	2015	2020	He was originally the interim city manager.
Matt Winters	2020	2024	Winters became city administrator of Jackson, Missouri.Replaced by city clerk Lori Phelps.
Robert Knodell	2025	2026	He previously served as deputy chief of staff to Governor Mike Parson.Replaced by assistant city manager Lori Phelps.

== Key ==
Key to party colors and abbreviations for members of the U.S. Congress and other politicians or officials
Alaskan Independence (AKIP) Know Nothing (KN) American Labor (AL) Anti-Jacksonian (Anti-J); National Republican (NR) Anti-Administration (AA) Anti-Masonic (Anti-M) Conservative (Con) Covenant (Cov)	Democratic (D) Democratic–Farmer–Labor (DFL) Democratic–NPL (D-NPL) Dixiecrat (Dix), States' Rights (SR) Democratic-Republican (DR) Farmer–Labor (FL) Federalist (F); Pro-Administration (PA)	Free Soil (FS) Fusion (Fus) Greenback (GB) Independence (IPM) Jacksonian (J) Liberal (Lib) Libertarian (L) National Union (NU)	Nonpartisan League (NPL) Nullifier (N) Opposition Northern (O); Opposition Southern (O) Populist (Pop) Progressive (Prog) Prohibition (Proh) Readjuster (Rea)	Republican (R) Silver (Sv) Silver Republican (SvR) Socialist (Soc) Union (U) Unconditional Union (UU) Vermont Progressive (VP) Whig (W)	Independent (I) Nonpartisan (NP)
