= David Sater =

American politician

Member of the Missouri Senate from the 29th district
- In office 2013–2021
- Preceded by: Jack Goodman
- Succeeded by: Mike Moon

David Sater (born November 7, 1947) is a former Republican member of the Missouri Senate, representing the 29th district. Previously, Sater served 4 terms in the Missouri House of Representatives (2004-2012), representing the 68th District.

== Early life and education ==
Born November 7, 1947 in Springfield, Missouri, Sater graduated from Greenwood High School in Springfield in 1965, and received a Bachelor of Science degree in Biology and Chemistry from Southwest Missouri State University in 1969. He went on to earn a degree in Pharmacy from the University of Missouri-Kansas City in 1972.

== Professional life ==
After earning his Pharm.D., Sater owned and operated Sater Pharmacy in Cassville from 1974 to 2004.

== Electoral history ==
=== State representative ===
Missouri House of Representatives Primary Election, August 3, 2004, District 68
Party	Candidate	Votes	%	±%
Republican	David Sater	5,471	100.00%	

Missouri House of Representatives Election, November 2, 2004, District 68
Party	Candidate	Votes	%	±%
Republican	David Sater	11,271	100.00%	+39.29

Missouri House of Representatives Election, November 7, 2006, District 68
Party	Candidate	Votes	%	±%
Republican	David Sater	7,721	71.06%	−28.94
Democratic	Adam Wells	3,144	28.94%	+28.94

Missouri House of Representatives Election, November 4, 2008, District 68
Party	Candidate	Votes	%	±%
Republican	David Sater	12,505	100.00%	+28.94

Missouri House of Representatives Election, November 2, 2010, District 68
Party	Candidate	Votes	%	±%
Republican	David Sater	9,364	100.00%	

=== State Senate ===
Missouri Senate Primary Election, August 7, 2012, District 29
Party	Candidate	Votes	%	±%
Republican	David Sater	15,211	50.69%	
Republican	James E. Strahan	6,540	21.80%	
Republican	Jim Strafuss	5,702	19.00%	
Republican	Gayle (Abigayle) Wridge	2,554	8.51%	

Missouri Senate Election, November 6, 2012, District 29
Party	Candidate	Votes	%	±%
Republican	David Sater	64,011	100.00%	

Missouri Senate Election, November 8, 2016, District 29
Party	Candidate	Votes	%	±%
Republican	David Sater	68,542	100.00%	

== Personal life ==
Sater and his wife, Sharon, reside in Cassville, Missouri and have two children, Joshua and Samantha. Sater is a member of the First Baptist Church of Cassville.
