= Brad Hudson =

American politician

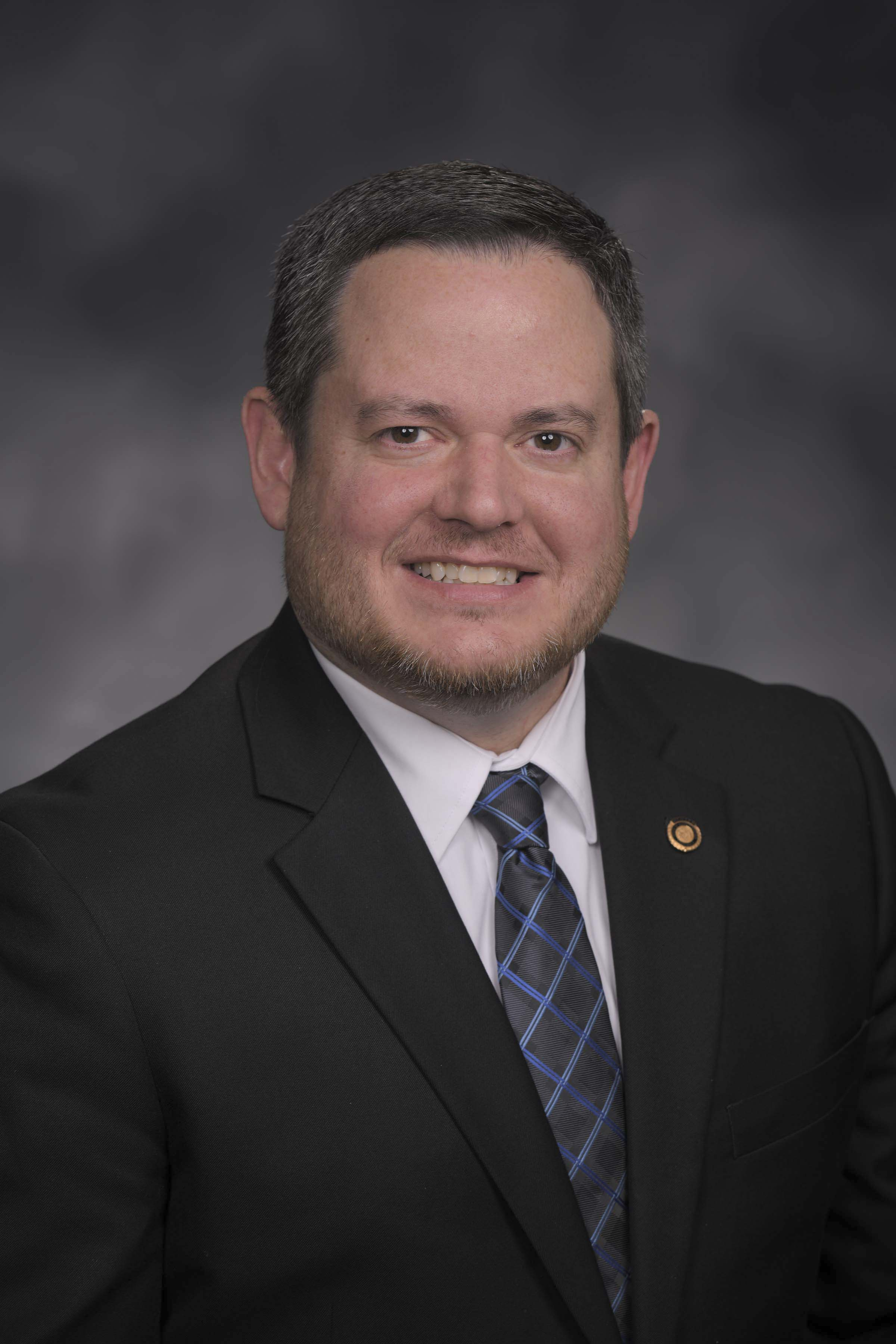

Member of the Missouri Senate from the 33rd district

Senator
- Incumbent
- Assumed office January 8, 2025
- Preceded by: Karla Eslinger

Member of the Missouri House of Representatives from the 138th district
- In office January 2019 – January 8, 2025
- Preceded by: Don Phillips
- Succeeded by: Burt Whaley

Personal details
- Party: Republican
- Spouse: Carissa
- Children: 2
- Education: Midwest College of Theology (BA)

Brad Hudson is an American politician serving as a member of the Missouri Senate for the 33rd district, representing much of southern Missouri. Brad previously served as a member of the Missouri House of Representatives from the 138th district from 2019 to 2025.

== Early life and education ==
Hudson was raised on a farm near Cape Fair, Missouri. He earned a Bachelor of Arts degree in biblical studies from the Midwest College of Theology in 2011.

== Career ==
Hudson worked as a chief compliance officer for the Stone County Department of Planning and Zoning. He was later elected to serve as Stone County Assessor in 2008 and served until his election to the Missouri House of Representatives. Hudson was elected to represent the 138th District of the Missouri House of Representatives in November 2018 and assumed office in January 2019. Hudson serves as the Chair of the Economic Development Committee and vice-chair of the Rules-Legislative Oversight Committee and the Special Committee on Public Policy. In May 2021, Hudson was appointed to serve as a member of the Missouri Tourism Commission.

In the 2024 Primary Election, Hudson defeated Representative Travis Smith to earn the Republican nomination for the Senate District 33, which comprises Douglas, Howell, Shannon, Ozark, Stone, Taney, and Texas Counties. Hudson faced no opposition in the 2024 General Election. He was sworn in as Senator for District 33 on January 8, 2025.

He was a member of the Missouri Freedom Caucus.

=== Legislation ===
In 2023, Hudson introduced a bill that would require public colleges to fund "belief-based" student groups regardless of viewpoint or membership requirements. Other legislators, campus leaders, ministers, and students voiced concerns that the bill could enable discrimination and even hate groups on college campuses. He was among a group of Republicans who advocated to revoke funding from public education addressing critical race theory or diversity, equity, and inclusion.

Also in 2023, Hudson sponsored legislation to restrict healthcare for transgender youth, however was absent from public testimony on the bill. He also rejected a proposed amendment to allow access for cases involving imminent danger, saying that it could allow exceptions on the basis of suicidal risk. Critics shared research demonstrating the positive impact that access to healthcare has on transgender children's mental health.

Hudson has introduced legislation for the 2024 cycle that would increase requirements on ballot initiatives for constitutional amendments to pass, and bills to increase restrictions to transgender health care, including provisions for medical providers to refuse treatment.

== Electoral history ==
2024 Missouri Senate District 33 General Election
| Party | Candidate | Votes | % | ±% |
|---|---|---|---|---|
| Republican | Brad Hudson | 79,814 | 100% | −− |

2024 Missouri Senate District 33 Republican Primary Election
| Party | Candidate | Votes | % | ±% |
|---|---|---|---|---|
| Republican | Brad Hudson | 18,488 | 52.6 | −− |
| Republican | Travis Smith | 16,656 | 47.4 | −− |

2022 Missouri House of Representatives District 138 General Election
| Party | Candidate | Votes | % | ±% |
|---|---|---|---|---|
| Republican | Brad Hudson | 14,345 | 100% | −− |

2022 Missouri House of Representatives District 138 Primary Election
| Party | Candidate | Votes | % | ±% |
|---|---|---|---|---|
| Republican | Brad Hudson | 6,927 | 100% | −− |

2020 Missouri House of Representatives District 138 General Election
| Party | Candidate | Votes | % | ±% |
|---|---|---|---|---|
| Republican | Brad Hudson | 18,652 | 100% | −− |

2020 Missouri House of Representatives District 138 Republican Primary Election
| Party | Candidate | Votes | % | ±% |
|---|---|---|---|---|
| Republican | Brad Hudson | 7,094 | 100% | −− |

2018 Missouri House of Representatives District 138 General Election
| Party | Candidate | Votes | % | ±% |
|---|---|---|---|---|
| Republican | Brad Hudson | 14,734 | 100% | −− |

2018 Missouri House of Representatives District 138 Republican Primary Election
| Party | Candidate | Votes | % | ±% |
|---|---|---|---|---|
| Republican | Brad Hudson | 4,691 | 79.0 | −− |
| Republican | Marshall Works | 949 | 16.0 | −− |
| Republican | Isaac Howard Paul Boyd | 300 | 5.1 | −− |
