= Karla May =

American politician from Missouri (born 1970)

Member of the Missouri Senate from the 4th district
- Incumbent
- Assumed office January 9, 2019
- Preceded by: Jacob Hummel

Member of the Missouri House of Representatives from the 84th district
- In office January 9, 2013 – January 9, 2019
- Preceded by: Don Gosen
- Succeeded by: Wiley Price IV

Member of the Missouri House of Representatives from the 57th district
- In office January 5, 2011 – January 9, 2013
- Preceded by: Hope Whitehead
- Succeeded by: Wanda Brown

Personal details
- Born: June 12, 1970 (age 56) St. Louis, Missouri
- Party: Democratic

Karla May (born June 12, 1970) is an American politician. She is a member of the Missouri Senate from the 4th district, serving since 2018. She previously represented the 84th district in the Missouri House of Representatives from 2010 to 2018. She is member of the Democratic Party.

Prior to entering politics, May worked for AT&T, also serving as a shop steward of Local 6300 of the Communications Workers of America. She received her bachelor's degree from Saint Louis University in business administration, and a master's degree in education from Lindenwood University.

May challenged and defeated incumbent State Senator Jacob Hummel (4th district) in the 2018 Democratic primary.

May was a candidate for United States Senate and along with December L. Harmon and Mita Biswas was defeated on August 6, 2024, in the Democratic Primary by attorney Lucas Kunce.

In 2025, May was the only Democrat to vote against repealing a 2001 law prohibiting same-sex marriage in Missouri.

== Electoral history ==
=== State representative ===
Missouri House of Representatives Primary Election, August 3, 2010, District 57
Party	Candidate	Votes	%	±%
Democratic	Karla May	1,386	50.60%	
Democratic	Hope Whitehead	1,353	49.40%	

Missouri House of Representatives Election, November 2, 2010, District 57
Party	Candidate	Votes	%	±%
Democratic	Karla May	7,385	100.00%	

Missouri House of Representatives Primary Election, August 7, 2012, District 84
Party	Candidate	Votes	%	±%
Democratic	Karla May	2,470	44.11%	−6.49
Democratic	Mike Owens	1,842	32.90%	
Democratic	Hope Whitehead	1,287	22.99%	−26.41

Missouri House of Representatives Election, November 6, 2012, District 84
Party	Candidate	Votes	%	±%
Democratic	Karla May	15,214	100.00%	

Missouri House of Representatives Election, November 4, 2014, District 84
Party	Candidate	Votes	%	±%
Democratic	Karla May	6,499	100.00%	

Missouri House of Representatives Election, November 8, 2016, District 84
Party	Candidate	Votes	%	±%
Democratic	Karla May	13,649	100.00%	

=== State Senate ===
Missouri Senate Primary Election, August 7, 2018, District 4
Party	Candidate	Votes	%	±%
Democratic	Karla May	20,303	57.20%	
Democratic	Jacob Hummel (incumbent)	15,189	42.80%	
Total votes		35,492	100	

Missouri Senate Election, November 6, 2018, District 4
Party	Candidate	Votes	%	±%
Democratic	Karla May	56,883	77.07%	+6.34
Republican	Robert J. Crump	16,927	22.93%	−6.34
Total votes		73,810	100	

Missouri Senate Election, November 8, 2022, District 4
Party	Candidate	Votes	%	±%
Democratic	Karla May	51,419	74.17%	−2.90
Republican	Mary Teresa McLean	17,906	25.83%	+2.90
Total votes		69,325	100.00%	

=== US Senate ===
United States Senator from Missouri, Primary Election, August 5, 2024
Party	Candidate	Votes	%	±%
Democratic	Lucas Kunce	255,775	67.64	
Democratic	Karla May	87,908	23.25	
Democratic	December L. Harmon	26,804	7.09	
Democratic	Mita Biswas	7,647	2.02	
Total votes		378,134	100.00	
