= Mike Colona =

American attorney and politician

Member of the Missouri House of Representatives from the 80th district
- In office January 7, 2009 – January 2017
- Preceded by: Mike Daus
- Succeeded by: Peter Merideth

Personal details
- Born: 1969 (age 56–57) St. Louis, Missouri, U.S.
- Party: Democratic
- Education: Truman State University (BS); St. Louis University (JD)

Mike Colona (born 1969) is an American attorney and politician who served as a member of the Missouri House of Representatives from 2009 to 2017. Before redistricting, Colona represented the 67th district. Colona more recently represented the 80th district, which is centered on the Tower Grove South area within the city of St. Louis. Colona also served as the House minority whip for the 96th General Assembly.

== Early life and education ==
Mike Colona was born in St. Louis in 1969. He is a 1987 graduate of Fox High School in Arnold, Missouri. Colona earned a Bachelor of Science degree from Truman State University and a Juris Doctor from St. Louis University.

== Career ==
A lawyer in private practice, he specializes in personal injury, worker's compensation and some first amendment cases. Colona was also an adjunct professor of criminal justice at the University of Missouri–St. Louis. He was one of three openly-LGBT legislators in Jefferson City, alongside Jolie Justus (D–Kansas City) and Jeanette Mott Oxford (D–St. Louis).

In August 2008, Colona defeated four other Democratic challengers in the primary to replace term-limited Representative Mike Daus. Colona won with nearly 43 percent of the vote. Colona was unopposed in the November 2008 general election. In the 2010 general election, Colona handily defeated Republican challenger Curtis Farber with 82-percent of the vote to win a second term.

Colona was a member of the American Legislative Exchange Council (ALEC), resigning in 2012. Doing so, he said "[ALEC] is not the innocuous, bipartisan organization it purports to be. Their agenda is radical and wrong for Missouri."

== Personal life ==
Colona is openly gay and both his 2008 and 2010 campaigns won the support of the Gay & Lesbian Victory Fund.
