= Chuck Purgason =

American politician

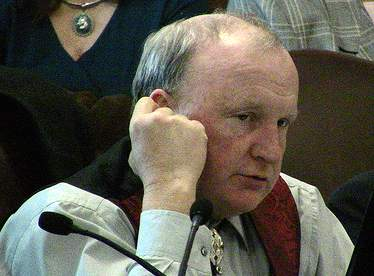
- Senator Purgason in January, 2011

Member of the Missouri Senate from the 33rd district
- In office 2004–2011
- Succeeded by: Mike Cunningham

Chuck Purgason (born May 19, 1960) was an American politician from the state of Missouri. A Republican, Purgason was an unsuccessful candidate for the United States Senate in 2010 losing the Republican primary to then-U.S. Congressman Roy Blunt.

Purgason was born in West Plains, Missouri, and graduated from West Plains High School in 1978. He is married to Janet Purgason and they have three children: Robert, Tracey, and Cory. He is the founder and owner of Ozark Awards, Ozark Wings Hatchery and Hunting Preserve, and is a resident of Caulfield, Missouri.

He was a member of the Missouri House of Representatives from 1996 through 2004, serving as his party's Majority Whip. He was first elected to the Missouri State Senate in 2004.
