= English Language Unity Act =

Proposed bill to establish English as the official language of the United States

Map of US official language status by state before 2016. Blue: English declared the official language; light-blue: 2 official languages, including English; gray: no official language specified.

The English Language Unity Act was first introduced in 2005. It hoped to establish English as the official language of the federal government of the United States. If enacted, it would require that all official functions and proceedings of federal and state government be conducted in English. It would also require that applicants for naturalization be tested on their ability to read and generally understand the English language. They would be tested on the laws of the United States as well as other important documents that relate to the law, including the Declaration of Independence and Constitution. It would also require that all naturalization ceremonies be conducted in English. If a person became injured because of violations of this act, they would be able to file suit in court. Before this act could be considered by the House of Representatives, it had to be approved by the House Judiciary, and Education and the Workforce Committees.

== History ==
The English Language Unity Act is based on a similar bill, "The Bill Emerson English Language Empowerment Act", which passed in the House of Representatives in 1999. However, it never became law. It tried to amend Federal law to declare English to be the official language of the U.S. Government. If it became a law, it would have required state representatives to conduct official business in English. It would have required that all officials conduct naturalization ceremonies entirely in English as well. Conservative Republican lawmaker Representative Steve King introduced this act to the House of Representatives on March 1, 2005 it was known as the English Language Unity Act of 2005. Before the 109th session of Congress ended, the bill accumulated 164 sponsors. The last action on this bill was the introductory remarks on the proposed bill on May 19, 2006. The bill did not come up for debate during this session of Congress, so it is said to have died.

Representative King reintroduced the bill as the English Unity Act of 2007 on February 12, 2007. This time it gained the support of 153 cosponsors. The last action on this proposed bill was on June 5, 2007 when the House Committee on Education and Labor referred the bill to the subcommittee on Early Childhood Education, Elementary and Secondary Education. Congress adjourned before further action could be taken, so the bill died again in 2007.

Representative King alongside Senator Jim Inhofe introduced the English Language Unity Act of 2011 on Friday, March 10, 2011. In a release King defended his proposition by saying "A common language is the most powerful unifying force known throughout history. We need to encourage assimilation of all legal immigrants in each generation. A nation divided by language cannot pull together as effectively as a people." Inhofe added: "This legislation will provide much-needed commonality among United States citizens, regardless of heritage. As a nation built by immigrants, it is important that we share one vision and one official language."

H.R. 997 had the support of 73 members of the U.S. House of Representatives in the 115th Congress (2017-2019), The Senate companion bill to H.R. 997, labeled S. 678 in the 116th Congress, was sponsored by Sen. James Inhofe of Oklahoma. It had 7 supporters in the U.S. Senate in the 115th Congress.

== Controversy ==
Repeated attempts to make English the official language of the United States had failed time and time again, though the issue never fails to spark heated debate. While appearing to focus solely on language, these attempts trigger issues related to financial burden, discrimination, patriotism, and unity.

Those against the legislation argue the bill deals with a non-issue. They claim Congress does not need to establish legislation to teach others the importance of knowing English since the language is already spoken by a majority of Americans. Opponents of the legislation question why there is a sudden need for an official language, given that the United States government has flourished without one for the past two centuries. They argue that it is not an official language that binds Americans as a country, but rather the freedoms and ideals that are enjoyed by its citizens.

Some opponents of the bill also argue that the legislation is unconstitutional. They assert it would limit the government's ability to correspond with all its citizens, and that by restricting federal and state employees from communicating with citizens in a language other than English, the bill violates First Amendment rights. Some further contend that the bill would call for changes to the Voting Rights Act by eliminating all non-English ballots, despite the fact that nothing in the bill's language modifies the Voting Rights Act.

Supporters of the legislation take the position that accommodation of non-English speakers discourages assimilation. They acknowledge that the ability to speak a language other than English is valuable, and that its use in the home, church, or private place of business should in no way be discouraged. Simultaneously, they argue that the government should not bear the responsibility of guaranteeing that non-English-speaking individuals can participate in government solely using their native language. They contend that as more immigrants learn English, the language barriers that divide the country into separate groups will disintegrate and lead to a decrease in racial and ethnic problems. They also believe that by learning English, individuals can become more productive citizens and members of American societies. They argue that immigrants who are fluent in English have better economic opportunities, and assert that non-English speakers tend to find themselves restricted to low-skilled, low-paying jobs. Supporters of the bill also posit that the ability of immigrant groups to speak English will give them an increased political voice and allow them to participate more fully and effectively in the democratic process.

== States legislation ==
Thirty-one states currently have adopted legislation similar to the English Language Unity Act:

- Alabama (1990)
- Alaska (1998)
- Arizona (2006)
- Arkansas (1987)
- California (1986)
- Colorado (1988)
- Florida (1988)
- Georgia (1986 & 1996)
- Hawaii (1978)
- Idaho (2007)
- Illinois (1969)
- Indiana (1984)
- Iowa (2002)
- Kansas (2007)
- Kentucky (1984)
- Louisiana (1812)
- Massachusetts (1975)
- Mississippi (1987)
- Missouri (1998 & 2008)
- Montana (1995)
- Nebraska (1920)
- New Hampshire (1995)
- North Carolina (1987)
- North Dakota (1987)
- Oklahoma (2010)
- South Carolina (1987)
- South Dakota (1995)
- Tennessee (1984)
- Utah (2000)
- Virginia (1981 & 1996)
- Wyoming (1996).

== Polling ==
In 2018, an Rasmussen poll found that 81% of American adults thought that English should be the official language of the United States, while 12% did not.

In 2021, a Rasmussen poll found that 73% of Americans thought that English should be the official language. Only 18% disagreed.

== See also ==
- English-only movement
