= Karla Eslinger =

American politician

Member of the Missouri Senate from the 33rd district
- In office January 6, 2021 – June 1, 2024
- Preceded by: Mike Cunningham
- Succeeded by: Vacant

Member of the Missouri House of Representatives from the 155th district
- In office January 9, 2019 – January 6, 2021
- Preceded by: David A. Day
- Succeeded by: Travis Smith

Personal details
- Party: Republican
- Education: College of the Ozarks (BA); Missouri State University (MEd, EdS); University of Missouri (EdD)

Karla Eslinger is a former member of the Missouri Senate representing the 33rd Missouri Senatorial District from 2021 to 2024. She succeeded fellow Republican Mike Cunningham. Eslinger previously served in the Missouri House of Representatives for one term.

In June 2024, Esligner resigned from the Missouri Senate in order to lead the Missouri Department of Elementary and Secondary Education.

== Personal life ==
Eslinger lives in Wasola, Missouri. She graduated Gainesville High School, and she got a master's degree in education administration at the Missouri State University.

== Electoral history ==
=== State House of Representatives ===
2018 Missouri State House District 155 Primary Election
| Party | Candidate | Votes | % | ±% |
|---|---|---|---|---|
| Republican | Karla Eslinger | 4,343 | 56.7% | N/A |
| Republican | Jack Clemans | 1,882 | 24.6% | N/A |
| Republican | Mike Lind | 1,439 | 18.8% | N/A |

2020 Missouri State House District 155 General Election
| Party | Candidate | Votes | % | ±% |
|---|---|---|---|---|
| Republican | Karla Eslinger | 12,778 | 100% | 0 |

=== State Senate ===
2020 Missouri State Senate District 33 Primary Election
| Party | Candidate | Votes | % | ±% |
|---|---|---|---|---|
| Republican | Karla Eslinger | 12,704 | 37.1% | N/A |
| Republican | Robert Ross | 12,562 | 36.7% | N/A |
| Republican | Van Kelly | 8,958 | 26.2% | N/A |

2020 Missouri State Senate District 33 General Election
| Party | Candidate | Votes | % | ±% |
|---|---|---|---|---|
| Republican | Karla Eslinger | 64,891 | 83.8% | −16.2 |
| Democratic | Tammy Harty | 12,533 | 16.2% | +16.2 |
