= Senator Childers =

Senator Childers may refer to:

- Abraham Childers (1750–1849), Kentucky Senate
- Don Childers (born 1932), Florida State Senate
- Greg Childers (fl. 2010s), Oklahoma State Senate
- Lawrence Childers (born 1944), Missouri State Senate
- W. D. Childers (born 1933), Florida State Senate

== See also ==
- Lawton Chiles (1930–1998), U.S. Senator from Florida from 1971 to 1989
- Senator Childs (disambiguation)
