= Ward Franz =

American politician

Member of the Missouri House of Representatives from the 151st district
- In office January 5, 2005 – January 9, 2013
- Preceded by: Chuck Purgason
- Succeeded by: Dennis Fowler

Personal details
- Born: June 3, 1963 (age 63) Jonesboro, Arkansas
- Party: Republican

Ward Franz (born June 3, 1963) is an American politician who served in the Missouri House of Representatives from the 151st district from 2005 to 2013.
