= Bill Burlison =

American politician (1931–2019)

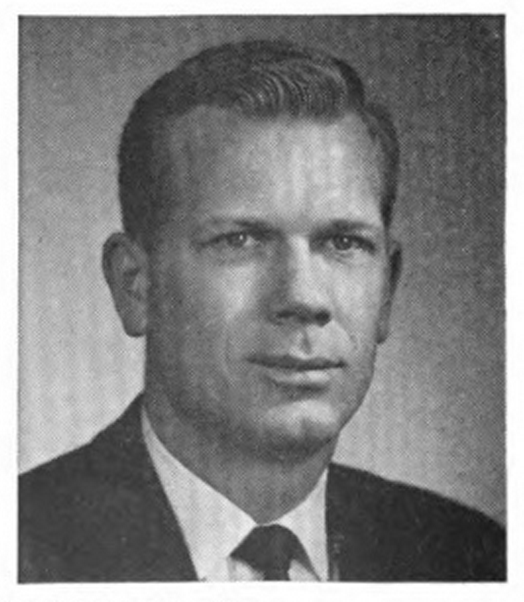

Member of the Anne Arundel County Council from the 4th district
- In office December 1998 – December 2006
- Preceded by: Bert L. Rice
- Succeeded by: Gerald James "Jamie" Benoit, Jr.

Member of the U.S. House of Representatives from Missouri's 10th district
- In office January 3, 1969 – January 3, 1981
- Preceded by: Paul C. Jones
- Succeeded by: Bill Emerson

Personal details
- Born: Billy Dean Burlison; March 15, 1931 Wardell, Missouri, U.S.
- Died: March 17, 2019 (aged 88) Wardell, Missouri, U.S.
- Party: Democratic
- Spouses: Barbara Humphreys (m. 1955; div. 1983) Michal Sue Mickey Prosser (m. 1995)
- Children: 3
- Education: Southeast Missouri State University (B.A., B.S.); University of Missouri (M.Ed., LL.B.); Catholic University of America (M.A.); American University (LL.M.)
- Profession: Lawyer

Billy Dean Burlison (March 15, 1931 – March 17, 2019) was an American lawyer and politician who held office in the states of Missouri and Maryland.

== Biography ==
Bill D. Burlison (as he was known in public life), the son of John Ivy "J.I." and Lillie (née Marler) Burlison, was born in Wardell, Missouri, on March 15, 1931. He graduated from Southeast Missouri State University, where he was student body president in 1952, and earned his law degree from the University of Missouri. He ultimately earned seven academic degrees in his lifetime.

Burlison was admitted to practice law in the District of Columbia, Maryland, and Missouri courts. He served in the United States Marine Corps. A Democrat, Burlison represented Missouri as a member of the U.S. House of Representatives in the 91st through the 96th Congresses, serving in the 10th district from 1969 to 1981. He was defeated in a bid for a seventh term by Republican Bill Emerson in 1980.

Moving to Maryland shortly after his congressional defeat, Burlison was an unsuccessful candidate for the Maryland House of Delegates in 1986 and 1990. He was elected to the County Council of Anne Arundel County, Maryland in 1998 and re-elected to a second and final term in 2002. In 2005 he entered the race in Maryland's 3rd congressional district in the 2006 election, but withdrew his candidacy after four months.

Burlison returned to his native state and settled in Advance, Missouri, where he ran for election to the 159th state legislative district in 2008 and 2010. He lost overwhelmingly both times to Billy Pat Wright. Burlison moved to his birthplace of Wardell, Missouri, to run for the 149th district in 2014 as state representative Steve Hodges was facing a term limit. He lost to Republican Don Rone, 2,770 (42.15%) to 3,802 (57.85%).

In 2016, at age 85, Burlison filed to run for the Missouri Senate against incumbent Republican Doug Libla and was unopposed in the Democratic primary. Libla won re-election with 69.35% of the vote.

Burlison married Barbara Humphreys in 1955; they had three children and divorced in 1983. He married Michal Sue (Mickey) Prosser in 1995 and they remained married until his death.

Burlison died on March 17, 2019, in his native Wardell, Missouri, two days after his 88th birthday.

U.S. House of Representatives
| Preceded by Paul C. Jones | Member of the U.S. House of Representatives from Missouri's 10th congressional district 1969–1981 | Succeeded by Bill Emerson |
