= Wiley Price IV =

American politician

Wiley Price

Member of the Missouri House of Representatives from the 84th district
- In office January 9, 2019 – January 4, 2023
- Preceded by: Karla May
- Succeeded by: Del Taylor

Personal details
- Born: April 27, 1984 (age 42)
- Party: Democratic

Wiley Edward "Chip" Price IV (born April 27, 1984) is a former Democratic member of the Missouri General Assembly from the State's 84th House district.

== Career ==
Price, a marketing director, was elected unopposed in 2018 and 2020.

== Sexual misconduct allegations and censure ==
Price was accused of having a sexual relationship with a House intern, a violation of House ethics policy, and threatening his legislative assistant when she reported it to House staff. The House Ethics Committee found that Price committed perjury in his testimony to the committee, obstructed with the committee investigation, and retaliated against his assistant.

On January 13, 2021, the House of Representatives formally censured Price by a vote of 140-3. An amendment to expel Price failed to receive the required two-third majority. As a consequence of censure, Price was removed from all committee assignments, prevented from holding leadership positions, and banned from directly supervising staff or interns. Price was later expelled from the House Democratic Caucus.

As of 2025, Price had returned to the Missouri State Capitol as an aide for State Senator Karla May.
