= Missouri's 25th Senate district =

American legislative district

Missouri's 25th State Senate district
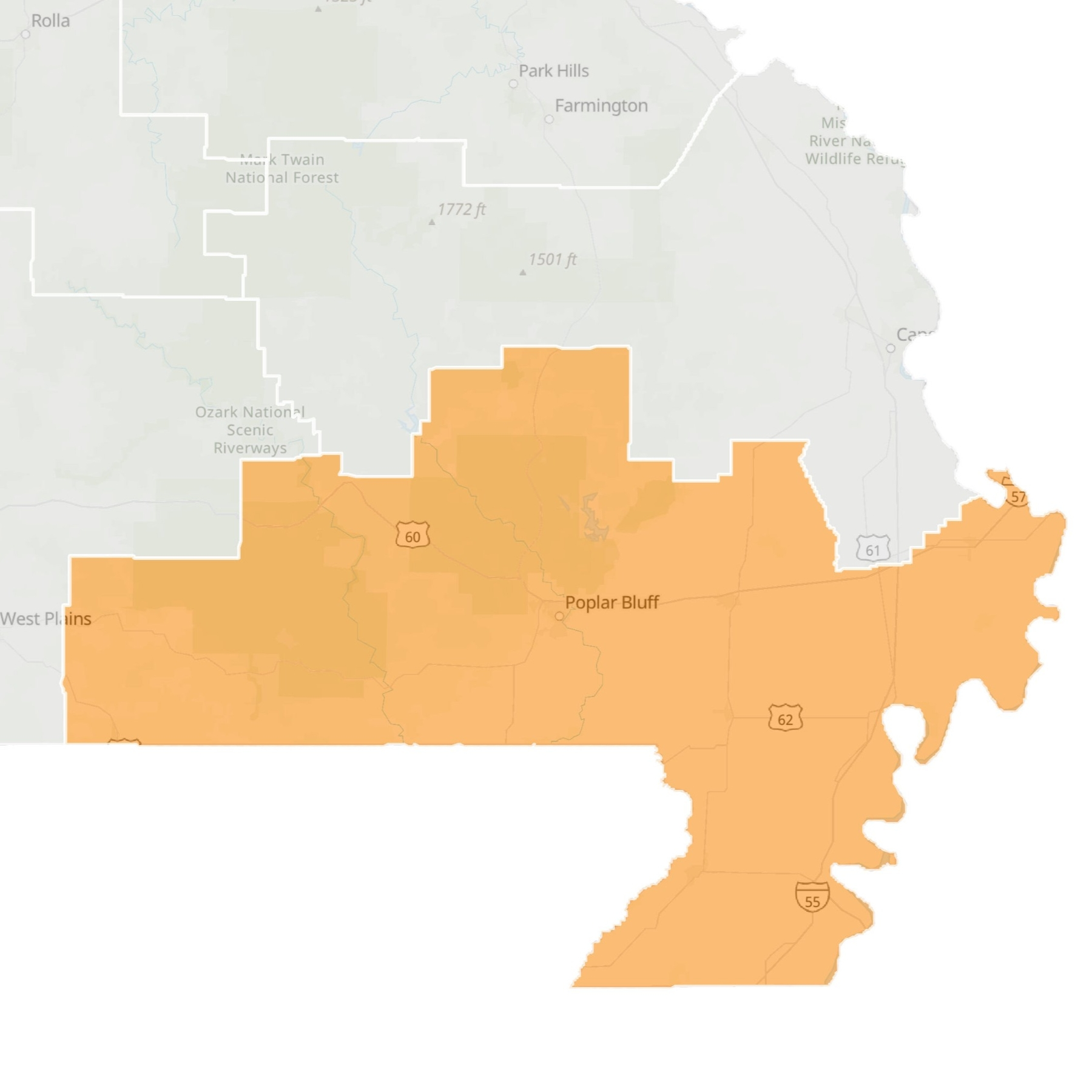
Senator
Jason Bean; R–Poplar Bluff
- Demographics: 83% White; 7% Black; 3% Hispanic; 6% Multiracial
- Population (2023): 177,530

Missouri's 25th Senatorial District is one of 34 districts in the Missouri Senate. The district has been represented by Republican Jason Bean since 2021.

== Geography ==
The district is based in Southeast Missouri and includes all of the counties of Butler, Carter, Dunklin, Mississippi, New Madrid, Pemiscot, Shannon, and Stoddard. Major cities in the district include Caruthersville, Charleston, Dexter, Kennett, and Poplar Bluff.

== Election results (1996–2024) ==
=== 1996 ===
Missouri's 25th Senatorial District election (1996)
Party	Candidate	Votes	%
Democratic	Jerry T. Howard	31,757	63.09
Constitution	Ray Rowland	18,582	36.91
Total votes		50,339	100.00
Democratic hold			

=== 2000 ===
Missouri's 25th Senatorial District election (2000)
Party	Candidate	Votes	%
Republican	Bill Foster	29,708	53.23
Democratic	Jerry T. Howard (incumbent)	26,107	46.77
Total votes		55,815	100.00
Republican gain from Democratic			

=== 2004 ===
Missouri's 25th Senatorial District election (2004)
Party	Candidate	Votes	%
Republican	Rob Mayer	37,575	56.56
Democratic	Patt Sharp	28,131	42.34
Libertarian	Curtis Steward	730	1.10
Total votes		66,436	100.00
Republican hold			

=== 2008 ===
Missouri's 25th Senatorial District election (2008)
Party	Candidate	Votes	%
Republican	Rob Mayer (incumbent)	43,232	65.32
Democratic	M. Shane Stoelting	22,952	34.68
Total votes		66,184	100.00
Republican hold			

=== 2012 ===
Missouri's 25th Senatorial District election (2012)
Party	Candidate	Votes	%
Republican	Doug Libla	35,757	56.16
Democratic	Terry Swinger	27,913	43.84
Total votes		63,980	100.00
Republican hold			

=== 2016 ===
Missouri's 25th Senatorial District election (2016)
Party	Candidate	Votes	%
Republican	Doug Libla (incumbent)	44,373	69.35
Democratic	Bill Burlison	19,607	30.65
Total votes		63,980	100.00
Republican hold			

=== 2020 ===
Missouri's 25th Senatorial District election (2020)
Party	Candidate	Votes	%
Republican	Jason Bean	58,215	100.00
Total votes		58,215	100.00
Republican hold			

=== 2024 ===
Missouri's 25th Senatorial District election (2024)
Party	Candidate	Votes	%
Republican	Jason Bean (incumbent)	62,593	83.67
Democratic	Chuck Banks	12,215	16.33
Total votes		74,808	100.00
Republican hold			

== Statewide election results ==
Year	Office	Results
2008	President	McCain 62.0 – 35.4%
2012	President	Romney 68.7 – 31.3%
2016	President	Trump 77.5 – 20.0%
2016	Senate	Blunt 65.4 – 30.7%
2016	Governor	Greitens 69.3 – 28.3%
2018	Senate	Hawley 74.0 – 23.5%
2020	President	Trump 80.4 – 18.6%
2020	Governor	Parson 79.3 – 19.0%
