= Rodger Reedy =

American politician

Member of the Missouri House of Representatives from the 57th district
- Incumbent
- Assumed office January 2019
- Preceded by: Wanda Brown
- Succeeded by: Matthew Sergent (elect)

Personal details
- Born: 1960 or 1961 (age 65–66) Clinton, Missouri, U.S.
- Party: Republican
- Spouse: Rhonda
- Children: 3
- Profession: Farmer

Rodger L. Reedy (born c. 1961) is an American politician. He is a member of the Missouri House of Representatives from the 57th District, serving since 2019. He is a member of the Republican Party.

== Missouri House of Representatives ==
=== Tenure ===
Reedy proposed a bill to allow the Missouri Department of Natural Resources (DNR) to acquire the Antioch cemetery in west-central Missouri’s Clinton as a state park and a historically significant educational site. It is operated and maintained by DNR’s Division of State Parks. The bill was approved by the Missouri House 149-0, and later passed by the Missouri senate. The bill was signed into law by governor Mike Parson.

=== Electoral history ===
Missouri House of Representatives Election, November 6, 2018, District 57
Party	Candidate	Votes	%	±%
Republican	Roger Reedy	10,271	73.69%	
Democratic	Joan Shores	3,667	26.31%	
Total votes		13,938	100.00%	

Missouri House of Representatives Election, November 3, 2020, District 57
Party	Candidate	Votes	%	±%
Republican	Roger Reedy	15,600	100.00%	+26.31
Total votes		15,600	100.00%	

Missouri House of Representatives Primary Election, August 2, 2022, District 57
Party	Candidate	Votes	%	±%
Republican	Roger Reedy	3,926	68.60%	
Republican	James Mahlon White	1,797	31.40%	
Total votes		5,723	100.00%	

Missouri House of Representatives Election, November 8, 2022, District 57
Party	Candidate	Votes	%	±%
Republican	Roger Reedy	10,723	83.60%	−16.40
Libertarian	William Truman (Bill) Wayne	2,103	16.40%	+16.40
Total votes		12,826	100.00%	

== Personal life ==
Reedy was born in Clinton and is a 1979 graduate of Lincoln High School in Lincoln, Missouri. He and his wife Rhonda have three grown children, Kayley, Austin and Wesley. They attend First Baptist Church in Clinton. Rhonda is a first grade teacher. In addition, she is also the co-owner of a gift shop in Clinton Square Historic District.
