= Robert Ross (Missouri politician) =

American politician

Member of the Missouri House of Representatives from the 143rd district
- Incumbent
- Assumed office 2013
- Preceded by: Don Wells

Personal details
- Born: February 8, 1981 (age 45) Houston, Missouri
- Party: Republican
- Spouse: Chrissy
- Children: 2
- Profession: Land surveyor

Robert Ross (born February 8, 1981) is an American politician. He was a member of the Missouri House of Representatives, having served since 2013 to 2021. He is a member of the Republican party. In the 2020 election cycle, he was a candidate for the Missouri Senate, District 33. He narrowly lost the Republican primary for that seat to fellow State Representative Karla Eslinger.

== Electoral history ==
=== State representative ===
Missouri House of Representatives Primary Election, August 7, 2012, District 142
Party	Candidate	Votes	%	±%
Republican	Robert Ross	2,075	33.09%	
Republican	Don Bordwell	1,957	31.21%	
Republican	Chris Purvis	1,191	18.99%	
Republican	Ted Sheppard	1,048	16.71%	

Missouri House of Representatives Election, November 6, 2012, District 142
Party	Candidate	Votes	%	±%
Republican	Robert Ross	11,843	100.00%	

Missouri House of Representatives Election, November 4, 2014, District 142
Party	Candidate	Votes	%	±%
Republican	Robert Ross	5,980	100.00%	

Missouri House of Representatives Election, November 8, 2016, District 142
Party	Candidate	Votes	%	±%
Republican	Robert Ross	11,308	81.49%	−18.51
Democratic	Bobby Johnston, Jr.	2,569	18.51%	+18.51

Missouri House of Representatives Election, November 6, 2012, District 142
Party	Candidate	Votes	%	±%
Republican	Robert Ross	10,412	100.00%	+18.51

=== State Senate ===
Missouri Senate Primary Election, August 4, 2020, District 33
Party	Candidate	Votes	%	±%
Republican	Karla Eslinger	12,704	37.12%	N/A
Republican	Robert Ross	12,467	36.71%	N/A
Republican	Van Kelly	8,958	26.17%	N/A
