= Bill Stouffer =

American politician

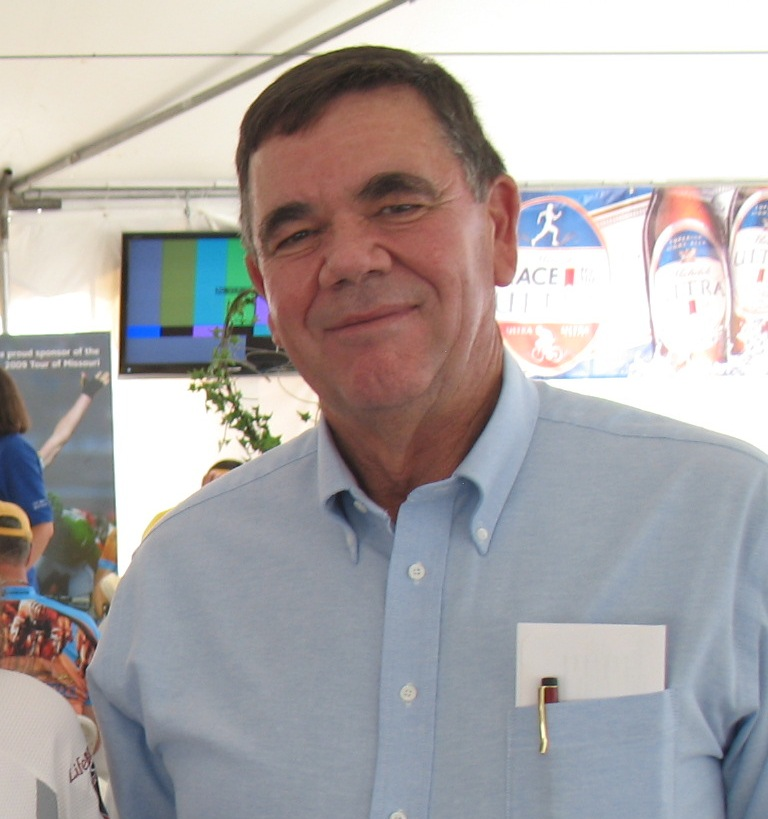

Member of the Missouri Senate from the 21st district
- Incumbent
- Assumed office 2004

Bill Stouffer (born April 19, 1947) is a farmer and small business owner. He is also currently a Republican member of the Missouri State Senate. He was born in Napton, Missouri and has resided in the 21st District all of his life. He is a graduate of the University of Missouri with a degree in agricultural economics.

== Personal life ==
He is the father of two, Bert and Rob, and has four grandchildren. Stouffer and his wife, Sue Ellen, currently live on their family farm near Napton, Missouri, in Saline County, where Stouffer has been an active farmer since 1967.

== Affiliations ==
He is a member of Smith Chapel United Methodist Church, the Missouri Cattlemen's Association, the Missouri Farm Bureau, and the National Rifle Association. He is a member, and has served as chairman of the board of MFA, Inc. from 1979 through 1995. He is Alma Meats, Inc.'s, treasurer and a founding member of the state's first Missouri Corn Merchandising Council. Stouffer chairs the University of Missouri's Ag-Alumni Foundation. He served as the board president of the Hardeman R-X School District.

== Political career ==
He was first elected to the Missouri State Senate in 2004, and serves on the following committees:

- Agriculture, Conservation, Parks and Natural Resources (vice chair)
- Aging, Families, Mental and Public Health
- Governmental Accountability and Fiscal Oversight
- Transportation (Chairman)

== Campaign for Congress ==
On September 23, 2009, at the Zarda Bar-B-Q in Blue Springs, Senator Stouffer announced his candidacy for U.S. Congress of Missouri's 4th District, currently held by Ike Skelton. In his announcement, he cited the need for an alternative to the "sharp left-turn" of Skelton's 97% liberal voting record. Stouffer faced former State Representative Vicky Hartzler in the Republican primary and lost. Hartzler went on to unseat Skelton.
