= Wanda Brown (politician) =

American politician

Member of the Missouri House of Representatives from the 57th district
- In office January 9, 2013 – January 9, 2019
- Preceded by: Karla May
- Succeeded by: Rodger Reedy

Member of the Missouri House of Representatives from the 116th district
- In office January 5, 2011 – January 9, 2013
- Preceded by: Tom Self
- Succeeded by: Kevin P. Engler

Personal details
- Born: May 31, 1966 (age 60) Sedalia, Missouri
- Party: Republican

Wanda Brown (born May 31, 1966) is an American politician who served in the Missouri House of Representatives from 2011 to 2019.
