= Jeanette Mott Oxford =

American activist and politician

Member of the Missouri House of Representatives from the 59th district
- In office January 2005 – January 2013
- Preceded by: Russ Carnahan

Personal details
- Born: July 16, 1954 (age 72) Eldorado, Illinois, U.S.
- Party: Democratic
- Spouse: Dorothy

Jeanette Mott Oxford (born July 16, 1954) is an American activist and politician from Missouri. Ze is a currently the Executive Director of the Missouri Association for Social Welfare, after having served as a member of the Missouri House of Representatives, representing a portion of St. Louis. A Democrat, ze was the first openly lesbian member of the Missouri Legislature.

== Biography ==
Oxford was born in Eldorado, Illinois and graduated from Cave-in-Rock High School in Cave-in-Rock, Illinois. Ze received an Associate of Arts degree from Southeastern Illinois College in Harrisburg, Illinois in 1974 and a Bachelor of Arts degree from Southern Illinois University-Carbondale in 1986.

Oxford attended Eden Theological Seminary in Webster Groves, Missouri and graduated with zir Master of Divinity in 1989. Prior to zir political career, Oxford served as executive director of the Reform Organization of Welfare (ROWEL) and as a grassroots coordinator for the American Lung Association, both in St. Louis.

Oxford's political career began in 2000, when ze sought election to the Missouri House of Representatives. Ze narrowly lost the Democratic primary election to Russ Carnahan. In 2004, Carnahan gave up the State Representative seat to run for Congress. Ze ran again for the seat, and was successful. Ze won in a three-way Democratic primary in August 2004, and obtained almost 90% of the vote against a Libertarian opponent in the November 2004 general election.

Oxford won re-nomination as the Democratic party candidate in the August 2006 primary, obtaining 81% of the vote against opponent Mark Rice, who also opposed zir in the three-way August 2004 primary. Ze faced only a Libertarian opponent in the November 2006 general election and won by more than eight-to-one. Ze faced no primary opposition in 2008, though a Libertarian filed to run against zir in November. Ze ran unopposed for re-election in 2010 and was elected to a final term in the House. Term limits prevented zir from seeking a fifth term in 2012.

Oxford is an active member of Epiphany United Church of Christ in St. Louis, and resides in the Benton Park neighborhood with zir partner, Dorothy. Ze was one of three openly gay members of the Missouri General Assembly, serving alongside Sen. Jolie Justus (D–Kansas City) and Rep. Mike Colona (D–St. Louis). Zir campaigns won the backing of the Gay & Lesbian Victory Fund.
