= Doug Libla =

American politician

Member of the Missouri Senate from the 25th district
- In office January 2013 – January 2021
- Preceded by: Robert Mayer
- Succeeded by: Jason Bean

Personal details
- Born: 1952 (age 73–74) Greenville, Missouri
- Party: Republican
- Spouse: Elaine
- Children: 1
- Education: Three Rivers Community College

Doug Libla (born 1952) is a former Republican member of the Missouri Senate, representing the southeasternmost part of the state. He was first elected to that position in 2012, receiving 56% of the vote over Democratic candidate Terry Swinger. He was reelected in 2016 over former U.S Congressman Bill Burlison.

Libla was mentioned as a possible contender in the 2013 special congressional election, but ultimately decided not to run.

== Personal life ==
Libla was born in 1952 to Clyde and Margie Libla. He and his wife, Elaine, have one daughter; Cassie. They reside in Poplar Bluff, Missouri.

== Electoral history ==
=== State Senate ===
Missouri Senate Primary Election, August 7, 2012, District 25
| Party | Candidate | Votes | % | ±% |
|---|---|---|---|---|
| Republican | Doug Libla | 12,010 | 100.00% | |

Missouri Senate Election, November 6, 2012, District 25
| Party | Candidate | Votes | % | ±% |
|---|---|---|---|---|
| Republican | Doug Libla | 35,757 | 56.16% | −9.16 |
| Democratic | Terry Swinger | 27,913 | 43.84% | +9.16 |

Missouri Senate Election, November 8, 2016, District 25
| Party | Candidate | Votes | % | ±% |
|---|---|---|---|---|
| Republican | Doug Libla | 44,373 | 69.35% | +13.19 |
| Democratic | Bill Burlison | 19,607 | 30.65% | −13.19 |
