= Peter Merideth =

American attorney and politician

Member of the Missouri House of Representatives from the 80th district
- In office 2017–2025
- Preceded by: Mike Colona
- Succeeded by: Elizabeth Fuchs

Personal details
- Born: Shaw, St. Louis, Missouri, U.S.
- Party: Democratic
- Children: 2
- Education: Catholic University (BM); Washington University in St. Louis (JD)

Peter Merideth is an American attorney and politician who was a member of the Missouri House of Representatives from 2017 to 2025, representing the 80th district. He was first elected in November 2016.

== Early life and education ==
Merideth was born and raised in Shaw, St. Louis. After graduating from St. Louis University High School, he earned a Bachelor of Music degree in musical theatre from the Catholic University of America and a Juris Doctor from the Washington University School of Law.

== Career ==
Merideth is a counsel at Dearing & Hartzog, L.C. He also served as a member of the St. Louis City Board of Equalization. He was elected to the Missouri House of Representatives in November 2016 and assumed office in 2017. Merideth also served as ranking minority member of the House General Laws Committee and House Budget Committee. During the 2020 legislative session, Merideth introduced legislation to legalize recreational marijuana in Missouri.

== Electoral history ==
Missouri House of Representatives Primary Election, August 2, 2016, District 80
Party	Candidate	Votes	%	±%
Democratic	Peter Meredith	3,442	60.45%	
Democratic	Ben Murray	2,252	39.55%	
Total votes		5,694	100.00%	

Missouri House of Representatives Election, November 8, 2016, District 80
Party	Candidate	Votes	%	±%
Democratic	Peter Meredith	12,917	84.62%	
Green	Teressa Rose Ezell	2,348	15.38%	
Total votes		15,265	100.00%	

Missouri House of Representatives Primary Election, August 7, 2018, District 80
Party	Candidate	Votes	%	±%
Democratic	Peter Meredith	6,267	79.34%	+18.89
Democratic	Mariah Vandiver	1,632	20.66%	n/a
Total votes		7,899	100.00%	

Missouri House of Representatives Election, November 6, 2018, District 80
Party	Candidate	Votes	%	±%
Democratic	Peter Meredith	13,827	100.00%	+15.38
Total votes		13,827	100.00%	

Missouri House of Representatives Election, November 3, 2020, District 80
Party	Candidate	Votes	%	±%
Democratic	Peter Meredith	15,637	100.00%	0.00
Total votes		15,637	100.00%	

Missouri House of Representatives Election, November 8, 2022, District 80
Party	Candidate	Votes	%	±%
Democratic	Peter Meredith	8,859	82.69%	−17.31
Republican	Kirk Hilzinger	1,525	14.24%	+14.24
Libertarian	Rebecca Sharpe Lombard	329	3.07%	+3.07
Total votes		10,713	100.00%	
