= Food Security Wheat Reserve =

Strategic grain reserve in the U.S.

The Food Security Wheat Reserve (FSWR) was a strategic grain reserve of up to 4 million metric tons of wheat held by the United States for use in meeting emergency food needs in developing countries, established by Title III of the Agricultural Act of 1980 (P.L. 96–494). This reserve generally was to be used to meet famine or other urgent or extraordinary relief requirements during periods of tight supplies and high prices when commodities are not available under the provisions of P.L. 480.

The FSWR was replaced by the Food Security Commodity Reserve under the 1996 farm bill (P.L. 104–127, Sec. 225), which has since been renamed the Bill Emerson Humanitarian Trust. The 2002 farm bill (P.L. 107–171, Sec. 3202) extended the Trust through 2007.
