= Bill I. Foster =

American politician

Member of the Missouri Senate from the 25th district
- In office 2001–2005

Personal details
- Born: December 23, 1946 Crockett, AR
- Died: January 10, 2025 (aged 78) Jefferson City, MO
- Party: Republican
- Spouse: Karen (divorced) Irene Heckemeyer
- Children: 1 daughter, Karmen (Foster) Carson
- Education: Milwaukee School of Engineering
- Occupation: politician, industrial engineer, national guardsman

Bill I. Foster (born December 23, 1946 - January 10, 2025) is an American politician who served in the Missouri Senate. He served in the National Guard. Foster served as mayor of Poplar Bluff from 1979 until 1980. He previously served in the Missouri House of Representatives between 1993 and 2001.
