= John Russell (Missouri politician) =

American politician

John T. Russell (September 22, 1931 – March 25, 2016) was an American politician who served as a Missouri state representative from 1962 until 1974 and a Missouri state senator from 1976 until 2000.

Born in Lebanon, Missouri, Russell previously served in the United States Air Force and as Minority Floor Leader in the Missouri Senate.
