= Farmer-Owned Grain Reserve =

The Farmer-Owned Grain Reserve (FOR) was a program, established under the Food and Agriculture Act of 1977, designed to buffer sharp price movements and to provide reserves against production shortfalls by allowing wheat and feed grain farmers to participate in a subsidized grain storage program. Farmers who placed their grain in storage received an extended nonrecourse loan for at least 3 years. Under certain conditions, interest on the loan could be waived and farmers could receive annual storage payments from the government. The 1996 farm bill (P.L. 104–127) repealed this program.
