= Jolie Justus =

American politician (born 1971)

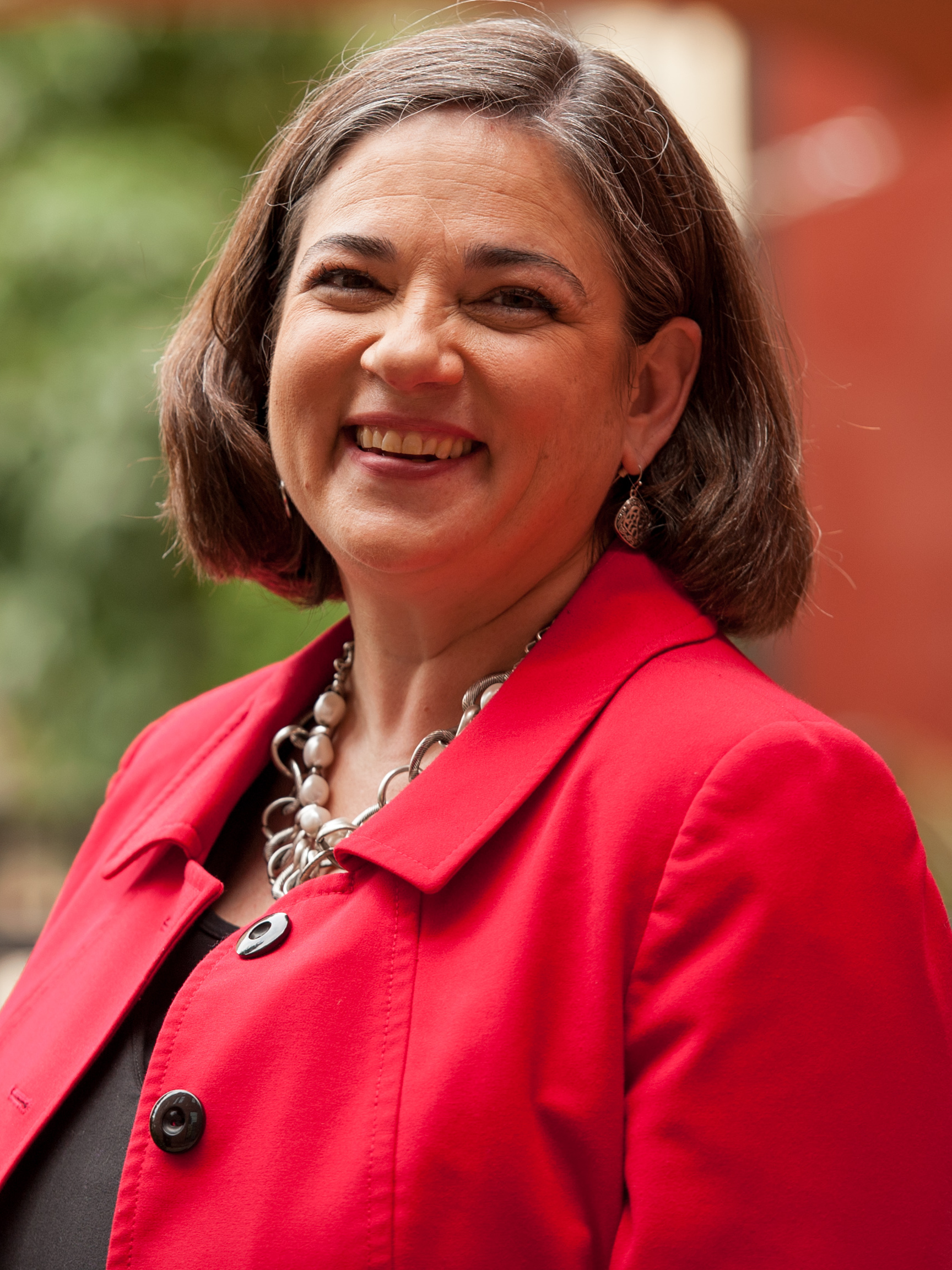

Minority Leader of the Missouri Senate
- In office January 7, 2013 – January 5, 2015
- Preceded by: Victor Callahan
- Succeeded by: Joe Keaveny

Member of the Missouri Senate from the 10th district
- In office January 2007 – January 5, 2015
- Preceded by: Charles Wheeler
- Succeeded by: Jeanie Riddle

Personal details
- Born: February 24, 1971 (age 55) Kansas City, Missouri, U.S.
- Party: Democratic
- Education: Southwest Missouri State University (BA); University of Missouri, Kansas City (JD)
- Website: Official website

Jolie L. Justus (born February 24, 1971) is an American lawyer and politician from Missouri. A Democrat, she was a member of the Missouri State Senate representing the 10th Senatorial District in Kansas City, serving as the Missouri Senate Minority Leader in her final two years.

== Early life and education ==
A lawyer by trade, she was raised in Branson, Missouri, where she attended Branson High School. She then went on to earn degrees at Southwest Missouri State University in Springfield and the University of Missouri–Kansas City School of Law. In 2011, Justus completed Harvard University's John F. Kennedy School of Government program for Senior Executives in State and Local Government as a David Bohnett LGBTQ Victory Institute Leadership Fellow.

== Career ==
Jolie Justus was elected to the Missouri State Senate in 2006. She represented Kansas City and Grandview and currently serves as the director of pro bono services for the law firm of Shook, Hardy, & Bacon LLP. Under her direction, this company has been recognized as one of the Top 100 free legal services programs in the nation.

In 2015 Jolie Justus ran for Kansas City Council's 4th District seat to replace termed-out incumbent, Jan Marcason, and garnered 72% of the vote in the April 7 municipal primary. She won the June 23, 2015, Kansas City general election against her challenger, John Fierro, obtaining 76.4% of the votes. As a Kansas City Councilwoman, Justus is chair of the Airport Committee, co-chair of the Legislative Committee, and vice chair of the Finance Committee. She has also been a member of the Transportation & Infrastructure Committee, the City Market Oversight Committee, and the Midtown Housing Advisory Board.

Prior to her time on the Council, Justus was both the Senate Democratic Leader in Jefferson City, as well as the chair of the Senate Standing Committee on Progress and Development. She was also the ranking member of both the Judiciary Committee and the Senate’s Committee on Jobs, Economic Development and Local Government. Justus introduced the Childcare Assistance Foster Care Reform bill while in the Senate, that would allow for children who opted out of the foster care system early, to be allowed to re-enter state custody until they turned 21. She also sponsored the Missouri Nondiscrimination Act, known as MONA, that would ban discrimination based on a person’s sexual orientation or gender. In addition, Justus co-sponsored the reform of the Criminal Code in 2014, which was passed in to law.

Justus has also served as an adjunct professor at the UMKC School of Law since 2010.

She ran for Mayor of Kansas City in the 2019 Kansas City mayoral election, where she was defeated by Quinton Lucas.

== Personal ==
Justus was the first openly gay member of the Missouri Senate and only the third ever publicly gay member of the Missouri General Assembly, after Representatives Tim Van Zandt (D-Kansas City), and Jeanette Mott Oxford (D-St. Louis).

Missouri Senate
Preceded by Victor Callahan	Minority Leader of the Missouri Senate; 2013–2015	Succeeded by Joe Keaveny
