= Joseph Keaveny =

American politician

Minority Leader of the Missouri Senate
- In office January 5, 2015 – July 7, 2016
- Preceded by: Jolie Justus
- Succeeded by: Gina Walsh

Member of the Missouri Senate from the 4th district
- In office 2009–2016
- Preceded by: Jeff Smith
- Succeeded by: Jacob Hummel

Personal details
- Born: October 5, 1956 (age 69) St. Louis, Missouri, U.S.
- Party: Democratic
- Spouse: Karen
- Education: University of Missouri–St. Louis (BS); St. Louis University (MS, JD)

Joseph Keaveny is an American attorney, banker, and politician who served as a member of the Missouri Senate for the 4th district from 2009 to 2016. After leaving the Senate, he was appointed to serve as Administrative Law Judge of the Missouri Department of Labor.

== Early life and education ==
Judge Keaveny is one of six children born to the late John Joseph and Mary Justine Keaveny. He grew up in the city's Skinker DeBaliviere neighborhood and is a graduate of Christian Brothers College High School. He earned a Bachelor of Science degree in accounting from the University of Missouri–St. Louis, followed by a Master of Science degree in finance and a Juris Doctor from Saint Louis University.

== Career ==
Keaveny has worked in the banking industry, managing portfolios for high-worth individuals and later managing U.S. Securities and Exchange Commission (SEC) compliance issues for U.S. Bancorp. For several years, he volunteered as a board member for the Skinker-DeBaliviere Housing Corporation — learning first-hand the challenges of rebuilding derelict properties, which led to a strong advocacy for state Historic Tax Credits.

During his tenure on the Skinker-DeBaliviere Community Council, Keaveny spent time working with the St. Louis Metropolitan Police Department on public safety issues — an experience that reinforced his belief that the City of St. Louis must regain local control of its police force, a position opposed by the St. Louis Police Officers' Association.

=== Missouri Senate ===
Keaveny was elected to the Missouri Senate to represent the citizens of the 4th Senatorial District, which includes downtown and eastern St. Louis City, during a special election on November 3, 2009, to fill an unexpired term. On July 7, 2016, Keaveny resigned his position in the Missouri Senate after being appointed by Missouri Governor Jay Nixon (D) to serve as an administrative law judge at the Department of Labor.

==== Committees ====
- Financial and Governmental Organizations and Elections
- Health, Mental Health, Seniors and Families
- Judiciary and Civil and Criminal Jurisprudence
- Veterans' Affairs, Pensions and Urban Affairs
- Educated Citizenry 2020 Committee
- Joint Committee on Education
- Joint Committee on Public Employees Retirement
- Joint Interim Committee on Oversight of Federal Stimulus and Stabilization Funds
- Governor's Council on Physical Fitness and Health
- Health Care Stabilization Fund Feasibility Board

== Personal life ==
Keaveny and wife Karen have four grown children: Shannon, Lauren, Joseph and Ellen.
