= Robert Mayer (politician) =

American politician

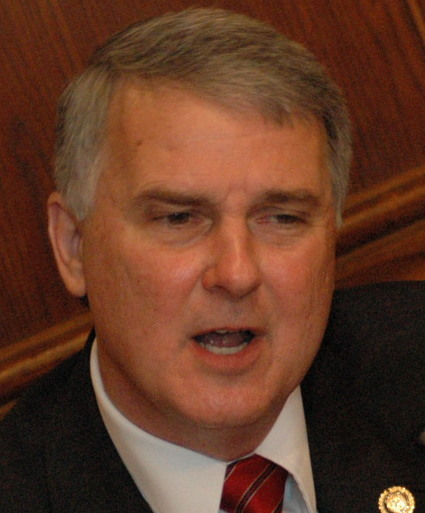

Member of the Missouri Senate from the 25th district
- In office 2004–2012
- Succeeded by: Doug Libla

Personal details
- Born: February 25, 1957 (age 69) Cape Girardeau, Missouri
- Education: Southeast Missouri State University; University of Missouri-Kansas City

Robert Mayer (born February 25, 1957) is an American attorney who has also worked as a farmer, broadcaster, and industrial engineering technician. He was also a Republican member of the Missouri State Senate. His term expired in 2012 and he was replaced by Doug Libla. He resides in Dexter, Missouri, with his wife, the former Nancy Tuley, and their three children, Jason, Dustin, and Daniel.

He was born in Cape Girardeau, Missouri, and educated in the Dexter public schools. He received a B.S. in political science from Southeast Missouri State University, and a J.D. from the University of Missouri-Kansas City in 1996.

He is a deacon of the First Baptist Church, and a member of Dexter Kiwanis Club, the Missouri Farm Bureau, the American-International Charolais Association, the Missouri Delta Center Advisory Committee, the Missouri Veterans Home Foundation Board, and the Stoddard County Gospel Mission Board.

He was first elected to the Missouri House of Representatives in 2000, and served in that body through 2004. That year, he was first elected to the Missouri State Senate and was first elected as President Pro Tem at the start of the 2011-2012 legislative session. On November 6, 2012, he was elected Judge of the 35th Circuit Court of Missouri. He served on the following committees:

- Judiciary and Civil and Criminal Jurisprudence (vice chair)
- Agriculture, Conservation, Parks and Natural Resources
- Appropriations
- Education.
