= Mike Cunningham (politician) =

American politician

Member of the Missouri Senate from the 33rd district
- Incumbent
- Assumed office 2013

Personal details
- Born: January 8, 1947 (age 79) Columbia, Missouri
- Party: Republican
- Children: three
- Profession: farmer

Mike Cunningham (born January 8, 1947) is an American politician. He is a member of the Missouri State Senate, having served since 2013. He was a member of the Missouri House of Representatives from 2003 to 2011, serving the 145th House District. He is a member of the Republican Party.

== Electoral history ==
=== State representative ===
Missouri House of Representatives Primary Election, August 6, 2002, District 145
Party	Candidate	Votes	%	±%
Republican	Mike Cunningham	4,286	64.01%	
Republican	Keith R. Mackie	1,697	25.34%	
Republican	Martha Myers	713	10.65%	

Missouri House of Representatives Election, November 5, 2002, District 145
Party	Candidate	Votes	%	±%
Republican	Mike Cunningham	8,399	71.69%	
Democratic	Patricia Watson	3,316	28.31%	

Missouri House of Representatives Election, November 2, 2004, District 145
Party	Candidate	Votes	%	±%
Republican	Mike Cunningham	13,956	100.00%	+28.31

Missouri House of Representatives Election, November 7, 2006, District 145
Party	Candidate	Votes	%	±%
Republican	Mike Cunningham	11,887	100.00%	

Missouri House of Representatives Election, November 4, 2008, District 145
Party	Candidate	Votes	%	±%
Republican	Mike Cunningham	15,844	100.00%	

=== State Senate ===
Missouri Senate Primary Election, August 7, 2012, District 33
Party	Candidate	Votes	%	±%
Republican	Mike Cunningham	11,874	37.12%	
Republican	Ward Franz	10,551	32.98%	
Republican	Don Wells	9,564	29.90%	

Missouri Senate Election, November 6, 2012, District 33
Party	Candidate	Votes	%	±%
Republican	Mike Cunningham	59,859	100.00%	+32.69

Missouri Senate Election, November 8, 2016, District 33
Party	Candidate	Votes	%	±%
Republican	Mike Cunningham	64,520	100.00%	
