= Jacob Hummel =

American politician and union leader

Member of the Missouri Senate from the 4th district
- In office January 2017 – January 9, 2019
- Preceded by: Joseph Keaveny
- Succeeded by: Karla May

Member of the Missouri House of Representatives from the 81st district
- In office January 9, 2013 – January 2017
- Succeeded by: Alfred Wessels

Personal details
- Born: May 24, 1976 (age 50) St. Louis, Missouri
- Party: Democratic
- Education: St. Mary's High School (St. Louis)
- Profession: Electrician; Politician; President of Missouri AFL-CIO

Jacob Hummel (born May 24, 1976) is an American politician, electrician, and union leader from the state of Missouri. A Democrat, he represented the 4th District in the Missouri Senate from January 2017 to January 2019. He previously represented the 82nd District in the Missouri House of Representatives from 2008 to 2017. While in the Missouri House, he served as the House Minority leader.

In 2014, while serving as a state representative, Hummel was elected as Secretary-Treasurer of the Missouri AFL-CIO. In July 2020, he became the President of the Missouri AFL-CIO.

== Personal life ==
Born in St. Louis, Missouri on May 24, 1976, he grew up in the metropolitan area and graduated from St. Mary's High School in 1994. Prior to entering politics Hummel worked as an electrician. He has one son, Timothy. They attend Saint Stephen Protomartyr Catholic Church. Among his community involvement activities are the Boulevard Heights Neighborhood Association, Carondelet Community Betterment Federation, Dutchtown South Community Corporation, and the Holy Hills Improvement Association. Hummel is also a member of the International Brotherhood of Electrical Workers Local 1. In addition, he previously served as president of the St. Louis City Labor Club.

== Political history ==
Jacob Hummel first ran for the Missouri House of Representatives in 2008, seeking the seat for House district 108. He defeated fellow Democrat Arthur Gansner by earning nearly 86-percent of the votes. No Republicans chose to run in the November general election, making Hummel's election a mere formality.

Missouri 108th District State Representative Election 2008 – Democratic Primary
Party	Candidate	Votes	%	±%
Democratic	Jacob Hummel	1,918	85.97	Winner
Democratic	Arthur Gansner	313	14.03	

In 2010 Hummel was unopposed in the August Democratic primary. In the November general election he defeated Republican challenger Joe L. Rusch by over 2,400 votes to earn a second term in the legislature.

Missouri 108th District State Representative Election 2010
Party	Candidate	Votes	%	±%
Democratic	Jacob Hummel	5,398	64.94	Winner
Republican	Joe L. Rusch	2,914	35.06	

Due to House redistricting following the 2010 United States Census the former 108th districts boundaries were altered and it was also renumbered as the new 81st District. Facing no challenger in either the August Democratic primary or the November general election of 2012, Hummel was elected to a third term in the Missouri House. He faced no opposition in the August Democratic primary of 2014, and in the general election he defeated Libertarian Party candidate Lisa Schaper by 78.98% to 21.02%.

Hummel was elected to the Missouri Senate in a special election held in 2016 to replace Joseph Keaveny, who had been appointed as an administrative labor law judge. He ran for a full term in 2018 but was defeated in the Democratic primary by State Representative Karla May.
