= Lawrence Childers =

American politician and attorney

Lawrence "Doyle" Childers (born November 1944) is a former American Republican politician who has served in the Missouri General Assembly in the Missouri Senate and the Missouri House of Representatives.

Born near Ironton, Missouri, Childers attended Arcadia Valley High School and graduated from the College of the Ozarks with graduate from Southwest Missouri State University. He served in the Peace Corps in Central America and has worked as former chemistry and physics teacher and in the home construction field. Childers has lived near Reeds Spring, Missouri.
