= Jack Goodman =

American politician

Personal details
- Born: September 9, 1973 (age 52) Aurora, Missouri
- Spouse: Laura
- Profession: Attorney

Jack Goodman (born September 9, 1973) is currently the Chief Judge of the Missouri Southern Court of Appeals, Southern District. He was appointed to the court by Governor Mike Parson after being nominated by the non-partisan Appellate Judicial Commission. He was most recently retained by Missouri voters by 76.2% in 2022.

== Biography ==
Jack Goodman grew up in Pierce City, Missouri, and graduated from Pierce City High School in 1991. He attended the University of Missouri, where he earned his bachelor's degree in Philosophy in 1995 and his Juris Doctor in 1998.

After graduating from law school, Sen. Goodman served as an assistant prosecuting attorney for Dade County, Missouri until 2002, when he was elected to his first term in the Missouri House. Then-Representative Goodman represented the 132nd District, covering almost all of Lawrence County. During his three-year House tenure, Sen. Goodman rose in the House ranks to serve as the Assistant Majority Floor Leader.

In the summer of 2005, Senator Larry "Gene" Taylor died less than one year into his first term in the Missouri Senate. Jack Goodman was nominated by the Republican Party to run in the special election to succeed Sen. Taylor. In his first race for the Missouri Senate, Goodman was elected to serve the remainder of that term ending in 2009, beating his Democratic opponent by 35 points.

In the 2008 election, Senator Goodman ran for a second term in the Missouri Senate. No candidate of any party chose to challenge him in his reelection bid. The 29th District, which he represented, included McDonald, Lawrence, Barry, Stone, Taney and Ozark counties at the time.

After he was termed out of the Missouri Senate in 2012, Goodman was elected Circuit Judge for the 39th Judicial Circuit where he served as Presiding Judge until his appointment to the Missouri Court of Appeals, Southern District, in 2020.
