= Chuck Gross =

American politician

Chuck Gross (born August 20, 1958) is a bank officer and Republican former member of the Missouri State Senate. He resides in St. Charles, Missouri, with his wife, Leslie Ann Gross, and their two daughters, Megan and Madelynn.

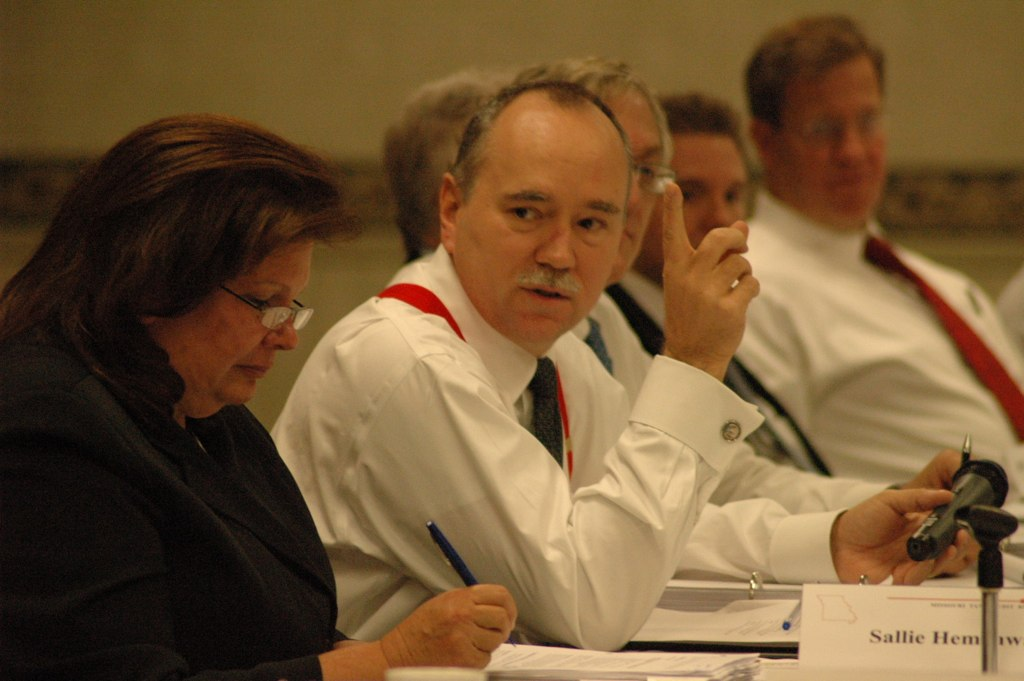

He graduated from St. Charles High School in 1976, and went on to University of Missouri. He received a B.A. degree in public administration there in 1981, and a M.P.A. in the same field in 1982.

He is a licensed real estate appraiser. He also currently works as a vice president at UMB Bank. He previously worked in the personnel management field with the Army and Air Force Exchange Service in Japan and Guam for eight years.

He is a member of the Missouri Tourism Commission, and a board member of Youth in Need.

He was first elected to the Missouri House of Representatives in 1992, and served in that body through 2000, when he was first elected to the Missouri State Senate.

He served on the following committees:

- Appropriations (chair)
- Gubernatorial Appointments
- Rules, Joint Rules, Resolutions and Ethics.

Senator Gross resigned his seat on May 31, 2007.
