= Randall Williams =

Randall Williams may refer to:

- Randall L. Williams Correctional Facility, a prison in Arkansas
- Randall Williams (showman) (1846–1898), British showman
- Randall Williams (politician), South African politician and attorney
- Randall W. Williams, physician and state health director

== See also ==
- Randell Williams (born 1996), English footballer
- Caroline Randall Williams (born 1987), American writer and cook
- Randy Williams (disambiguation)
