= COVID-19 pandemic in Missouri =

- Disease: COVID-19
- Pathogen: SARS-CoV-2
- Location: Missouri, U.S.
- First outbreak: Milan, Italy
- Index case: St. Louis County
- Arrival date: March 6, 2020
- Confirmed cases: 488,981
- Recovered: 111,807
- Deaths: 7,819

Government website
- Missouri Department of Health & Senior Services, Missouri Coronavirus - Worldometers

The COVID-19 pandemic was confirmed to have reached the U.S. state of Missouri in March 2020. A university student who had recently been to Italy, was the first index case for COVID-19 in Missouri. She was treated at Mercy Hospital St. Louis. As of February 8, 2021, the Missouri Department of Health and Senior Services has confirmed 502,432 cumulative cases and 7,562 deaths.

As of May 10, 2023, Missouri has administered 4,269,469 COVID-19 vaccine doses, equivalent to 70% of the total population. Out of those 4.2 Million doses administered, 3,634,453 have been fully vaccinated (received the second dose of the COVID-19 Vaccine), equivalent to 59% of the total population.

== Timeline ==
=== 2020 ===
==== March ====
On March 6, a woman from St. Louis County tested positive for the virus. A student of Indiana University who had been studying abroad in Milan, Italy had flown into O'Hare International Airport in Chicago, Illinois, on March 3 and traveled to St. Louis via Amtrak on March 4. Two days later, on March 8, family members of the patient violated quarantine, leading Villa Duchesne and Oak Hill School to close.

On March 12, the second case in the state was reported, at a clinic in Springfield in Greene County. The person had recently traveled to Austria.

On March 13, the second case in St. Louis County, the third in the state, was announced. On March 14, Henry County officials confirmed their first case; Greene County confirmed its second case. On March 16, Greene County confirmed its third case. The city of St. Louis announced its first case: a student at Saint Louis University. Cass County reported its first case: a resident of Drexel.

Missouri Governor Mike Parson announced on March 18 that a 60-year-old woman in Boone County was the first coronavirus-related death in the state.

On March 19, the Missouri Department of Health and Senior Services announced four more cases of coronavirus in the state, increasing the total number of positive cases to 28 in the state.

On March 24, agents with the FBI shot and killed an armed man just before he could detonate a car bomb outside a hospital in Kansas City. The man, identified as 36-year-old Timothy Wilson, who was affiliated with the local Atomwaffen group. The FBI's office in Missouri issued an alert stating Wilson "shared instructions on how to make an improvised explosive device with another ... Domestic Terrorism subject", who was identified by ABC News as Jarrett Smith, another Atomwaffen member. Wilson allegedly targeted the hospital because he believed it was treating COVID-19 patients. The officer-involved shooting occurred days after the FBI's New York field office and the Department of Homeland Security issued alerts warning of the possibility of far-right extremists and others exploiting the pandemic to commit terrorist attacks.

==== April ====
On April 1, St. Louis County had its fifth confirmed death from COVID-19. The death came from a man who was around the age of 50 to 59 years old. On April 16, the state surpassed 5,000 positive COVID-19 cases and 150 deaths.

==== May ====
On May 4, the state reported a record high number of 368 new COVID-19 cases. That same day salons were given permission by the governor to reopen. On May 23, it was reported that a stylist at one of the salons had tested positive after working eight days while symptomatic. On May 24, the local health department announced that a second hairstylist at the same salon had tested positive. Anthony Fauci has said local outbreaks are "inevitable" as restrictions are eased.

On May 26, large crowds were recorded at the Lake of the Ozarks on Memorial Day weekend. The St. Louis County Department of Public Health issued a travel advisory for people to self-quarantine for 14 days if they had not observed social-distancing rules.

==== June ====
On June 12, the Springfield-Greene County Health Department announced that none of the 140 customers and six coworkers that interacted with the hair stylists were infected. The salon required that stylists and clients wear face masks during appointments.

On July 8, 82 campers and staff at a Christian Kanakuk K-2 summer camp in Lampe, Missouri tested positive for COVID-19, leading to the camp being shut down. Campers returned home to ten different states, and were required to sleep "head-to-foot".

On June 17, the University of Kansas Health System reported the state's death rate due to the virus was more than double that of Kansas.

On July 20, a cluster of cases were reported among 19 students and two other people were infected with the virus after attending a graduation and prom at St. Dominic High School in O'Fallon.

On July 21, Governor Parson in a radio interview with KFTK-FM said that children have to return to schools, that they would inevitably get COVID-19, and would "get over it". The American Academy of Pediatrics' weekly report from when states started reporting cases to July 16 indicated that of states that reported the data, there were 241,904 child cases, 2,074 child hospitalizations, and 66 child deaths from COVID-19.

==== September ====
From September 16 to 20, an estimated 125,000 people attended the BikeFest at the Lake of the Ozarks. The St. Louis Department of Health encouraged attendees to be tested for COVID-19.

On September 23, Governor Parson announced that he and his wife had tested positive for COVID-19.

=== 2021 ===
==== July ====
In July the mayor of Springfield, Missouri issued a statement urging vaccination to curb the surge of infections as the Delta variant spread through the state. City officials said the state had a vaccination rate of 45.1%. 81% of people between 65 and 84 reported receiving at least one vaccine dose, but that figure dropped to 41% for the 25 to 34 year old age group. State officials have noted low vaccination rates in rural areas.

Hospitalizations reached the highest levels since January, nearing record levels in the state's southwestern region. Most of these patients were unvaccinated. As of July 18 only 16% of the states ICU beds and 25% hospital beds were available. Some counties issued recommendations that face masks be worn by unvaccinated persons and around unvaccinated persons. A joint public health advisory was issued by ten Kansas City health departments to that effect. No mask mandate was put in place.

As hospitals neared capacity community leaders in Springfield and Greene County requested state funding for alternative care sites such as a field hospital. The hospital association issued a statement:

If the rest of the state follows current trajectories — with Delta systematically picking off localized pockets of unvaccinated Missourians — our entire health care system will be very near the brink it flirted with during the winter of 2020-2021.

=== 2022 ===
==== March ====
On March 30, 2022, Missouri Governor Mike Parson announced the Missouri will move on into the endemic phase for COVID-19.

== Government response ==
Governor Mike Parson declared a state of emergency on March 13, 2020. The National Park Service closed the Gateway Arch and the associated museum beginning March 18 until further notice.

By March 19, all 555 school districts in Missouri reported some form of district-wide school closures. Many of the school districts were initially closed until at least April 3.

Both St. Louis City and St. Louis County issued a stay-at-home order effective Monday, March 23. Various city and county ordinances were enacted in several areas of the state.

At the end of March, Governor Parson announced no plans to issue a stay-at-home order. However, on April 3, the state's chief executive issued an official stay-at-home order that would be in effect for Missouri from April 6 until April 24, 2020. The order stated Missouri residents should avoid leaving their homes unless necessary, giving authorization only to do so for essential activities, essential business, or essential travel with detailed guidelines. On April 16, Governor Parson extended the stay-at-home order until May 3.

On April 22, Attorney General Eric Schmitt filed a lawsuit in U.S. federal court against the Chinese government. The lawsuit, considered the first of its kind, said, "Chinese authorities deceived the public, suppressed crucial information, arrested whistleblowers, denied human-to-human transmission in the face of mounting evidence, destroyed critical medical research, permitted millions of people to be exposed to the virus, and even hoarded personal protective equipment—thus causing a global pandemic that was unnecessary and preventable." Due to the Chinese government's sovereign immunity, it will be difficult for the lawsuit to succeed, according to legal experts.

=== School reopenings ===
In late-August, there were protests in Kansas City for and against resumption of in-person classes. Most school districts in Kansas city had plans for online only instruction, except in Independence where teachers were told they had to resume teaching in-person classes or opt-out without pay. Teachers have expressed fears that the classrooms are too small for social distancing and that there were no protocols in place for the classrooms to be cleaned between classes. Parents in other districts protested against online classes citing concerns about depression and increased drug use.

Governor Mike Parson has said the decisions on what format classes will follow, whether in person or online, will be made by school districts. Betsy DeVos has told public school districts that they wouldn't receive federal money unless schools are fully reopened for the 2020–21 school year.

Since early-August, teachers have been protesting the decision to reopen schools while the numbers of infected are still rising.

State officials estimate that one out of five students don't have the broadband access needed for online learning. Despite Court decisions reaffirming parents rights to access the Missouri Course Access and Virtual School Program (MOCAP), some districts were still not informing parents of their rights to access the 10 established virtual education providers through MOCAP. Districts are legally required to feature the MOCAP program on their websites and families have the right to choose from any of the MOCAP providers, but the statute doesn't specify a penalty for non-compliance with its requirements.

An eighth grader in Franklin County died on November 2. The 13-year-old, who last attended in-person classes on October 22, was the youngest Missourian to die from the virus up to that point.

On November 12, 2020, Governor Parson announced a new change on guidelines for quarantine in K-12 schools. The new guidelines say that if a person comes into contact with another who tested positive for COVID-19, they must quarantine unless they were wearing a mask.

== Vaccine hesitancy ==
As hospitals neared capacity in July 2021 amid rising fears that the spread of the Delta variant could exceed winter hospitalization numbers state and federal officials urged vaccination. White House officials and others have noted that Federal door-to-door efforts would not be effective in Missouri, but encouraged local community leaders to perform outreach efforts in their communities.

Anthony Fauci noted the urgency of vaccination efforts: "If we continue to allow the virus to freely circulate like it seems to be doing in Missouri, you're giving that virus an opportunity mutate enough to really become a problem".

== Demographics ==
In September, NPR reported that African Americans and Latin Americans were dying at nearly three times the rate of White Americans in Kansas City.

== Statistics by county ==
COVID-19 pandemic medical cases in Missouri by county
County (Note: County where individuals with a positive case reside. Location of diagnosis and treatment may vary.)	Cases (Note: Reported confirmed and probable cases. Actual case numbers are probably higher.)	Deaths	Population (Note: July 2019 population estimate from "U.S. Census Bureau Quick Facts: Missouri". United States Census Bureau.)	Cases / 100k
115 / 115	1,791,560	22,950	6,137,428	29,190.7
Adair	6,785	71	25,343	26,772.7
Andrew	5,712	66	17,712	32,249.3
Atchison	1,824	24	5,143	35,465.7
Audrain	6,946	125	25,388	27,359.4
Barry	8,040	153	35,789	22,465.0
Barton	3,422	56	11,754	29,113.5
Bates	4,496	103	16,172	27,801.1
Benton	5,542	115	19,443	28,503.8
Bollinger	3,318	50	12,133	27,346.9
Boone	54,124	304	180,463	29,991.7
Buchanan	30,046	351	87,364	34,391.7
Butler	12,591	188	42,478	29,641.2
Caldwell	2,115	43	9,020	23,447.9
Callaway	14,561	149	44,743	32,543.6
Camden	10,983	197	46,305	23,718.8
Cape Girardeau	23,731	279	78,871	30,088.4
Carroll	2,716	48	8,679	31,293.9
Carter	1,772	24	5,982	29,622.2
Cass	30,564	352	105,780	28,893.9
Cedar	3,860	61	14,349	26,900.8
Chariton	2,055	43	7,426	27,673.0
Christian	25,286	297	88,595	28,541.1
Clark	1,941	50	6,797	28,556.7
Clay	33,926	417	121,317	27,964.8
Clinton	5,814	132	20,387	28,518.2
Cole	24,500	308	76,745	31,923.9
Cooper	4,824	82	17,709	27,240.4
Crawford	6,654	117	23,920	27,817.7
Dade	1,848	50	7,561	24,441.2
Dallas	4,751	83	16,878	28,149.1
Daviess	2,046	32	8,278	24,716.1
DeKalb	2,661	53	12,547	21,208.3
Dent	4,005	93	15,573	25,717.6
Douglas	3,099	89	13,185	23,504.0
Dunklin	9,797	143	29,131	33,630.8
Franklin	31,928	420	103,967	30,709.7
Gasconade	4,140	115	14,706	28,151.8
Gentry	2,639	37	6,571	40,161.3
Greene	86,310	1,177	293,086	29,448.7
Grundy	3,175	76	9,850	32,233.5
Harrison	2,485	36	8,352	29,753.4
Henry	7,144	96	21,824	32,734.6
Hickory	2,449	59	9,544	25,660.1
Holt	1,322	34	4,403	30,025.0
Howard	2,989	39	10,001	29,887.0
Howell	11,161	232	40,117	27,821.1
Independence (Note: Independence is within Jackson county.)	36,935	496	116,672	31,657.1
Iron	2,717	53	10,125	26,834.6
Jackson	82,635	894	266,558	31,000.8
Jasper	24,665	350	76,489	32,246.5
Jefferson	68,723	762	225,081	30,532.6
Johnson	14,911	154	54,062	27,581.3
Joplin (Note: Joplin spans across Jasper and Newton counties.)	16,715	241	50,924	32,823.4
Kansas City (Note: Kansas City spans across Jackson, Platte, Cass and Clay counties.)	141,429	1,367	495,377	28,549.8
Knox	1,218	16	3,959	30,765.3
Laclede	9,747	197	35,723	27,284.9
Lafayette	9,322	151	32,708	28,500.7
Lawrence	9,454	190	38,355	24,648.7
Lewis	3,454	48	9,776	35,331.4
Lincoln	18,730	164	59,013	31,738.8
Linn	3,173	80	11,920	26,619.1
Livingston	4,503	109	15,227	29,572.5
Macon	4,312	69	15,117	28,524.2
Madison	4,355	60	12,088	36,027.5
Maries	1,990	42	8,697	22,881.5
Marion	9,935	137	28,530	34,823.0
McDonald	6,254	80	22,837	27,385.4
Mercer	912	17	3,617	25,214.3
Miller	7,160	129	25,619	27,948.0
Mississippi	4,470	66	13,180	33,915.0
Moniteau	4,436	61	16,132	27,498.1
Monroe	2,526	52	8,644	29,222.6
Montgomery	3,142	63	11,551	27,201.1
Morgan	4,987	129	20,627	24,177.0
New Madrid	6,166	96	17,076	36,109.2
Newton	13,978	224	52,151	26,802.9
Nodaway	7,340	51	22,092	33,224.7
Oregon	2,531	45	10,529	24,038.4
Osage	3,840	52	13,615	28,204.2
Ozark	2,053	64	9,174	22,378.5
Pemiscot	3,941	86	15,805	24,935.1
Perry	6,402	52	19,136	33,455.3
Pettis	15,074	191	42,339	35,603.1
Phelps	13,039	265	44,573	29,253.1
Pike	5,304	65	18,302	28,980.4
Platte	12,935	108	57,453	22,514.1
Polk	10,050	122	32,149	31,260.7
Pulaski	10,878	138	52,607	20,677.9
Putnam	1,182	26	4,696	25,170.4
Ralls	2,989	30	10,309	28,994.1
Randolph	7,230	118	24,748	29,214.5
Ray	6,271	103	23,018	27,243.9
Reynolds	1,408	27	6,270	22,456.1
Ripley	3,234	71	13,288	24,337.7
Saline	7,275	123	22,761	31,962.6
Schuyler	897	26	4,660	19,248.9
Scotland	845	20	4,902	17,237.9
Scott	14,042	172	38,280	36,682.3
Shannon	1,928	44	8,166	23,610.1
Shelby	2,102	18	5,930	35,446.9
St. Charles	121,533	1,073	402,022	30,230.4
St. Clair	2,640	47	9,397	28,094.1
St. Francois	23,877	333	67,215	35,523.3
St. Louis (county)	293,006	3,592	994,205	29,471.4
St. Louis City (Note: Independent city and not within limits of a county.)	77,350	879	300,576	25,733.9
Ste. Genevieve	4,918	42	17,894	27,484.1
Stoddard	7,257	152	29,025	25,002.6
Stone	7,054	137	31,952	22,076.9
Sullivan	2,057	29	6,089	33,782.2
Taney	16,236	255	55,928	29,030.2
Texas	5,733	114	25,398	22,572.6
Vernon	6,197	116	20,563	30,136.7
Warren	10,067	119	35,649	28,239.2
Washington	7,134	156	24,730	28,847.6
Wayne	2,998	58	12,873	23,289.1
Webster	10,443	165	39,592	26,376.5
Worth	575	5	2,013	28,564.3
Wright	4,644	95	18,289	25,392.3
Final update May 16, 2023, with data through the previous day Data is publicly reported by Missouri Department of Health and Senior Services

== See also ==
- Timeline of the COVID-19 pandemic in the United States
- COVID-19 pandemic in the United States – for impact on the country
- COVID-19 pandemic – for impact on other countries
