= 2016 Missouri lieutenant gubernatorial election =

- November 8, 2016
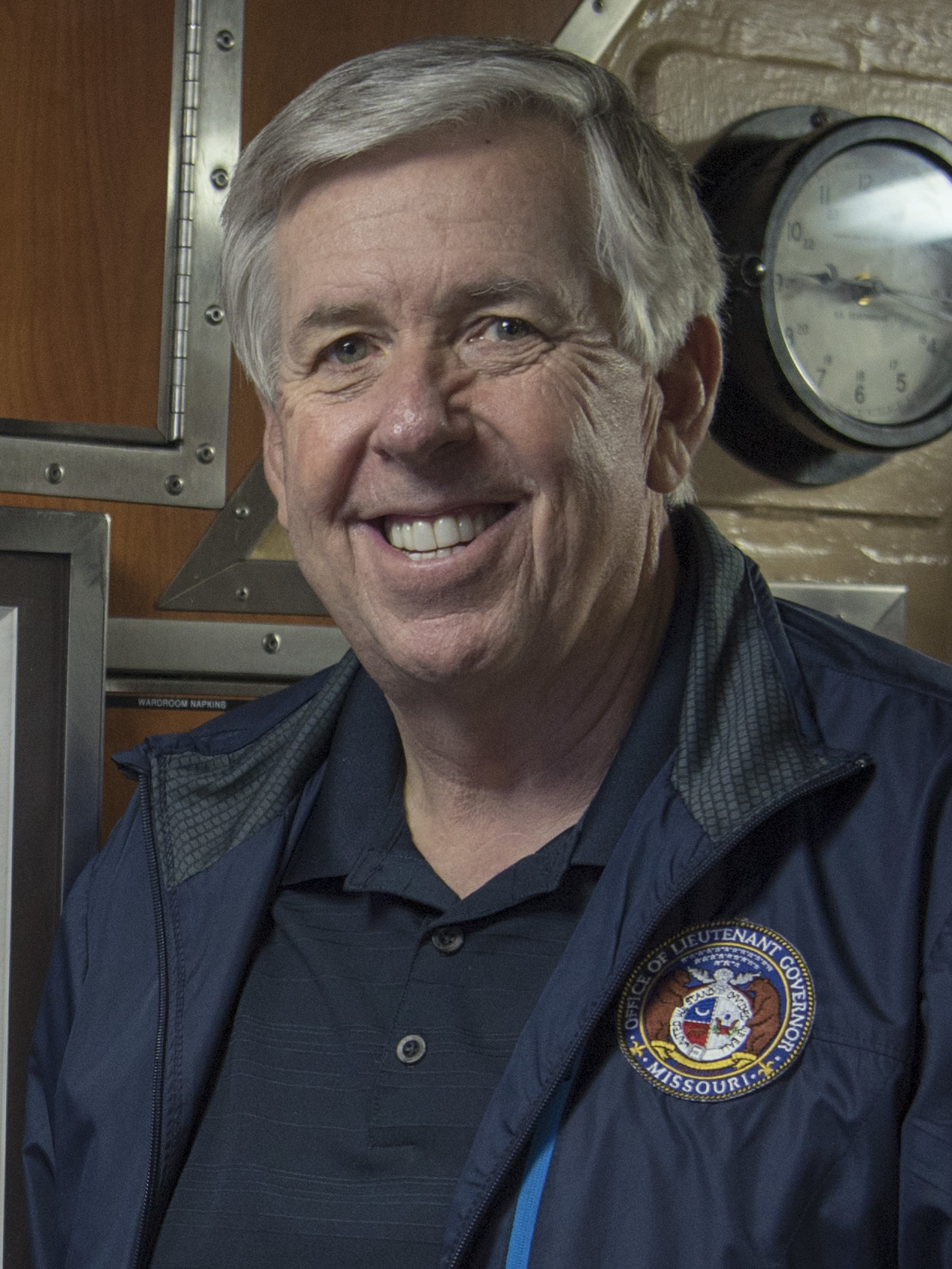

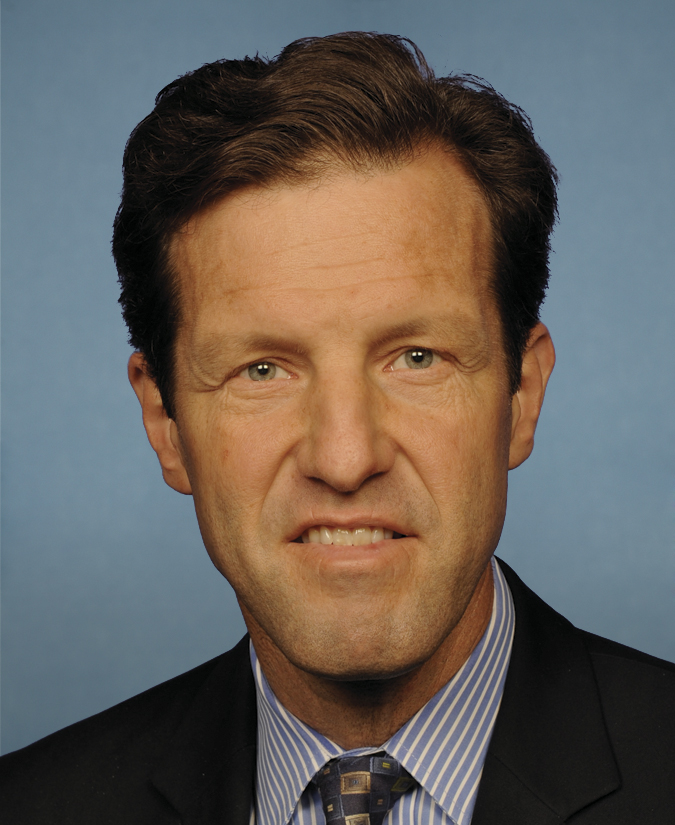
Nominee	Mike Parson	Russ Carnahan
Party	Republican	Democratic
Popular vote	1,459,392	1,168,947
Percentage	52.80%	42.29%
- Parson: 40–50% 50–60% 60–70% 70–80% 80–90% >90% Carnahan: 40–50% 50–60% 60–70% 70–80% 80–90% >90% Tie: 40–50% 50% No votes
Lieutenant Governor before election
Peter Kinder
Republican
Elected Lieutenant Governor
Mike Parson
Republican

The 2016 Missouri lieutenant gubernatorial election was held on November 8, 2016, to elect the lieutenant governor of Missouri, concurrently with the 2016 U.S. presidential election, as well as elections to the United States Senate, elections to the United States House of Representatives, and various state and local elections.

The primaries were held on August 2. Incumbent Republican Lieutenant Governor Peter Kinder did not seek re-election to a fourth term in office, instead unsuccessfully running for governor of Missouri. State Senator Mike Parson and former U.S. representative Russ Carnahan won the Republican and Democratic primaries, respectively.

== Democratic primary ==
=== Candidates ===
==== Declared ====
- Winston Apple, musician, author, retired teacher and 2014 State House candidate
- Russ Carnahan, former U.S. representative
- Tommie Pierson, state representative

==== Withdrawn ====
- Brad Bradshaw, physician and attorney

==== Declined ====
- Barry Aycock, businessman
- Jason Holsman, state senator
- Mike Sanders, Jackson County executive, former Jackson County prosecuting attorney and former chairman of the Missouri Democratic Party
- John Wright, state representative
- Clint Zweifel, State Treasurer of Missouri

=== Endorsements ===
Russ Carnahan

Newspapers

- The Kansas City Star
- St. Louis Post-Dispatch

=== Polling ===
Poll source	Date(s) administered	Sample size	Margin of error	Brad Bradshaw	Russ Carnahan	Tommie Pierson	Undecided
SurveyUSA	July 20–24, 2016	500	± 4.4%	—	57%	11%	26%
Remington Research	September 18–19, 2015	1,589	± 2.4%	11%	48%	7%	37%

=== Results ===
Democratic primary results
Party	Candidate	Votes	%
Democratic	Russ Carnahan	243,157	75.9
Democratic	Tommie Pierson Sr.	38,700	12.1
Democratic	Winston Apple	38,372	12.0
Total votes		320,229	100.0

== Republican primary ==
=== Candidates ===
==== Declared ====
- Arnie C. – AC Dienoff
- Mike Parson, state senator
- Bev Randles, attorney and chairwoman of Missouri Club for Growth

==== Withdrawn ====
- Peter Kinder, incumbent lieutenant governor (running for governor)

==== Declined ====
- Tom Dempsey, president pro tem of the Missouri Senate
- Caleb Jones, state representative
- Tim Jones, speaker of the Missouri House of Representatives
- Mike Kehoe, state senator
- Doug Libla, state senator
- Eric Schmitt, state senator (running for state treasurer)

=== Endorsements ===
Mike Parson

Individuals

- Dan W. Brown, state senator
- Tom Dempsey, president pro tem of the Missouri Senate
- Mike Kehoe, state senator
- Doug Libla, state senator
- Brian Munzlinger, state senator
- David Pearce, state senator
- Ron Richard, Majority Leader of the Missouri Senate
- Gary Romine, state senator
- David Sater, state senator
- Dave Schatz, state senator
- Wayne Wallingford, state senator
- Jay Wasson, state senator
- Paul Wieland, state senator

Newspapers

- The Kansas City Star
- St. Louis Post-Dispatch
Bev Randles

Individuals

- Sonya Anderson, state representative
- Kurt Bahr, state representative
- Chuck Basye, state representative
- Rick Brattin, state representative
- Cloria Brown, state representative
- Eric Burlison, state representative
- Jason Chipman, state representative
- Kevin Corlew, state representative
- Paul Curtman, state representative
- Shamed Dogan, state representative
- Dean Dohrman, state representative
- Ed Emery, state representative
- Shelley Keeney, state representative
- Mike Kelley, state representative
- Andrew Koenig, state representative
- Kirk Mathews, state representative
- Mike Moon, state representative
- Mark Parkinson, state representative
- Holly Rehder, state representative
- Tim Remole, state representative
- Rebecca Roeber, state representative
- Rob Vescovo, state representative
- Bill White, state representative
- John Wiemann, state representative
- Ken Wilson, state representative

=== Polling ===
Poll source	Date(s) administered	Sample size	Margin of error	Mike Parson	Bev Randles	Undecided
SurveyUSA	July 20–24, 2016	773	± 3.6%	37%	26%	34%
Remington Research Group (R)/Missouri Scout	July 7–8, 2016	1,022	± 3.0%	23%	24%	46%

=== Results ===
Republican primary results
Party	Candidate	Votes	%
Republican	Mike Parson	331,367	51.5
Republican	Bev Randles	282,134	43.9
Republican	Arnie Dienoff	29,872	4.6
Total votes		643,373	100.0

== Green Party ==
=== Candidates ===
==== Declared ====
- Jennifer Leach, labor union activist

== General election ==
=== Polling ===
Poll source	Date(s) administered	Sample size	Margin of error	Russ Carnahan (D)	Mike Parson (R)	Other	Undecided
DFM Research	October 27 – November 1, 2016	508	± 4.4%	39%	36%	6%	19%
Remington Research Group	October 9–11, 2016	2,171	± 2.1%	44%	43%	—	8%
Gravis Marketing	September 11–13, 2016	604	± 4.0%	44%	40%	—	16%
Remington Research Group	September 1–2, 2016	1,275	± 3.0%	41%	44%	—	9%
Remington Research Group	August 5–6, 2016	1,280	± 3%	44%	42%	—	9%
Public Policy Polling	September 22–23, 2015	731	± 3.6%	39%	44%	—	17%

Hypothetical polling

with Brad Bradshaw

Poll source	Date(s) administered	Sample size	Margin of error	Brad Bradshaw (D)	Mike Parson (R)	Other	Undecided
Public Policy Polling	September 22–23, 2015	731	± 3.6%	37%	39%	—	24%

Poll source	Date(s) administered	Sample size	Margin of error	Brad Bradshaw (D)	Bev Randles (R)	Other	Undecided
Public Policy Polling	September 22–23, 2015	731	± 3.6%	39%	28%	—	33%

=== Results ===
2016 Missouri lieutenant gubernatorial election
Party	Candidate	Votes	%	±%
Republican	Mike Parson	1,459,392	52.80%	+3.64%
Democratic	Russ Carnahan	1,168,947	42.29%	−2.94%
Libertarian	Steven R. Hedrick	69,253	2.50%	−0.31%
Green	Jennifer Leach	66,490	2.41%	N/A
Write-in	Jake Wilburn	87	0.00%	N/A
Total votes		2,764,169	100.0%	N/A
Republican hold				

==== By congressional district ====
Parson won six of eight congressional districts.

District	Parson	Carnahan	Representative
1st	18%	77%	Lacy Clay
2nd	52%	44%	Ann Wagner
3rd	59%	37%	Blaine Luetkemeyer
4th	61%	34%	Vicky Hartzler
5th	37%	57%	Emanuel Cleaver
6th	58%	37%	Sam Graves
7th	69%	26%	Billy Long
8th	66%	30%	Jason Smith

== See also ==
- 2016 Missouri gubernatorial election
