= Mike Parson =

American politician (born 1955)

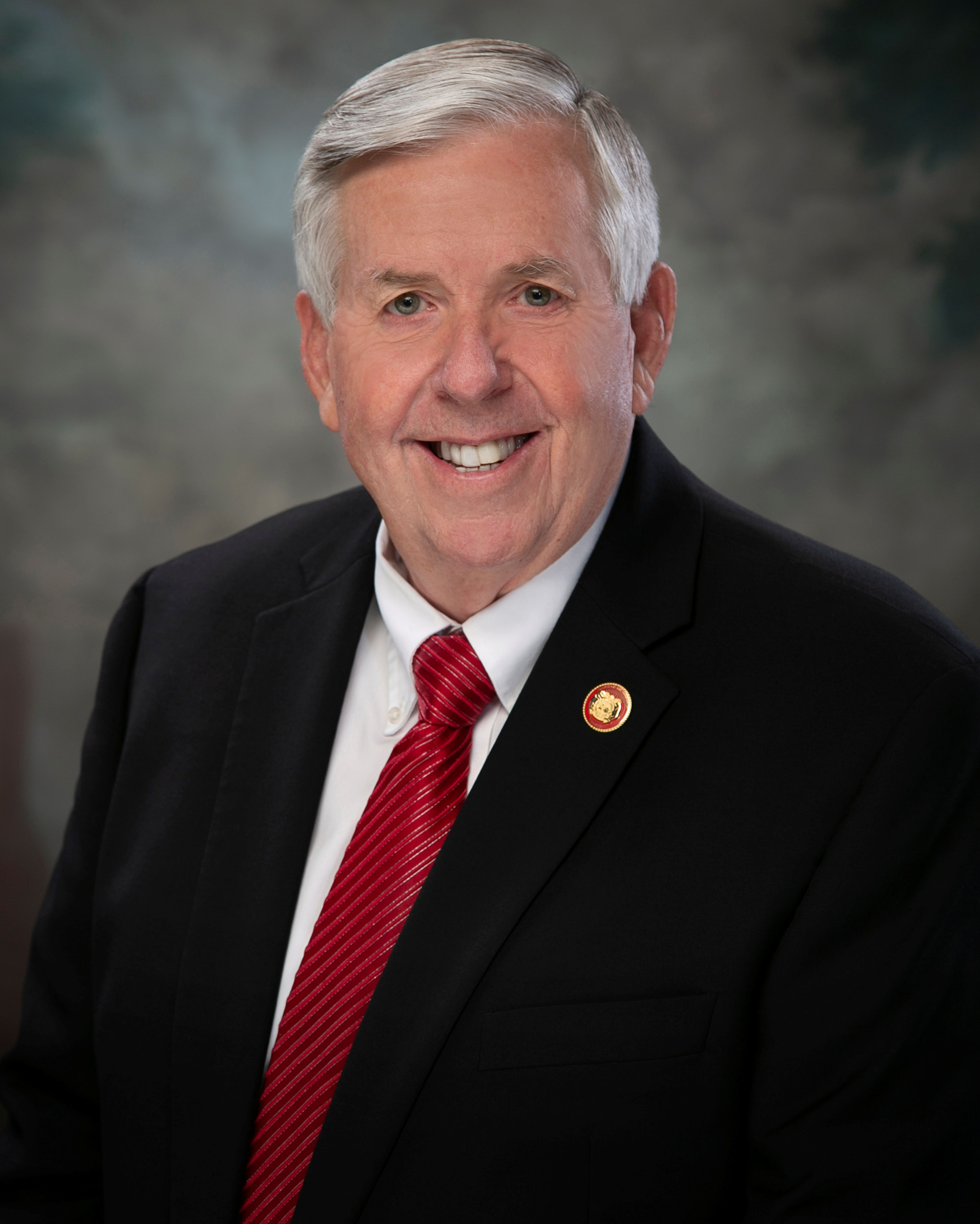
- Official portrait, 2021

57th Governor of Missouri
- In office June 1, 2018 – January 13, 2025
- Lieutenant: Mike Kehoe
- Preceded by: Eric Greitens
- Succeeded by: Mike Kehoe

47th Lieutenant Governor of Missouri
- In office January 9, 2017 – June 1, 2018
- Governor: Eric Greitens
- Preceded by: Peter Kinder
- Succeeded by: Mike Kehoe

Member of the Missouri Senate from the 28th district
- In office January 5, 2011 – January 4, 2017
- Preceded by: Delbert Scott
- Succeeded by: Sandy Crawford

Member of the Missouri House of Representatives from the 133rd district
- In office January 5, 2005 – January 5, 2011
- Preceded by: Ronnie Miller
- Succeeded by: Sue Entlicher

Sheriff of Polk County
- In office 1993–2004
- Preceded by: Charles Simmons
- Succeeded by: Steven Bruce

Personal details
- Born: Michael Lynn Parson; September 17, 1955 (age 70) Wheatland, Missouri, U.S.
- Party: Republican
- Spouse: Teresa Parson (m. 1985)
- Children: 2
- Education: University of Maryland, College Park (attended); University of Hawaii, Manoa (attended)

Military service
- Branch/service: United States Army
- Years of service: 1975–1981
- Rank: Sergeant
- Unit: Military Police Corps
- Parson's voice Parson on reopening schools amid the COVID-19 pandemic in Missouri. Recorded July 7, 2020

Michael Lynn Parson (born September 17, 1955) is an American politician and former law enforcement officer who served as the 57th governor of Missouri, from 2018 to 2025. A member of the Republican Party, Parson assumed the governorship upon the resignation of Eric Greitens, under whom he served as lieutenant governor from 2017 to 2018. Parson served the remainder of Greitens's term and was elected governor in his own right in 2020.

Parson served in the Missouri House of Representatives from 2005 to 2011 and the Missouri Senate from 2011 to 2017. He was elected lieutenant governor in 2016. He assumed the governorship on June 1, 2018, upon Greitens's resignation. As governor, Parson signed a bill criminalizing abortion after eight weeks of pregnancy and opposed Medicaid expansion, both of which were overturned by ballot measure. He oversaw the state's response to the COVID-19 pandemic, issuing a temporary stay-at-home order in April 2020 but allowing school districts to decide whether to close.

Parson placed restrictions on mail-in voting during the 2020 U.S. elections, and oversaw Missouri's reaction to the George Floyd protests, which included pardoning a couple who pointed guns at unarmed protesters on their private street. He shortened the sentence of the son of Kansas City Chiefs Coach Andy Reid, who seriously injured a child while drunk driving.

In the last full year of his term, Parson faced intense public scrutiny over his refusal to commute the sentence of Marcellus Williams, a Black man who was sentenced to capital punishment in connection to the 1998 murder of Felicia Gayle. Despite gaining the prosecutor’s support, Williams was executed via lethal injection on September 24, 2024.

== Early life, education, and career ==
Michael Lynn Parson was born on September 17, 1955, in Wheatland, Missouri, and raised on a farm in Hickory County. He graduated from Wheatland High School in 1973.

Parson enlisted in the United States Army in 1975, and served six years in the Military Police Corps, discharged in 1981 with the rank of sergeant. While in the Army, he attended night classes at the University of Maryland and the University of Hawaiʻi, without completing disciplined study at either institution.

Parson returned to Hickory County in 1981 to serve as a sheriff's deputy, and transferred to the Polk County Sheriff's Office to become its first criminal investigator in 1983. He served as Polk County sheriff from 1993 to 2004.

In 1984, Parson purchased a gas station and named it Mike's. He eventually owned and operated three gas stations in the area.

== Missouri General Assembly ==
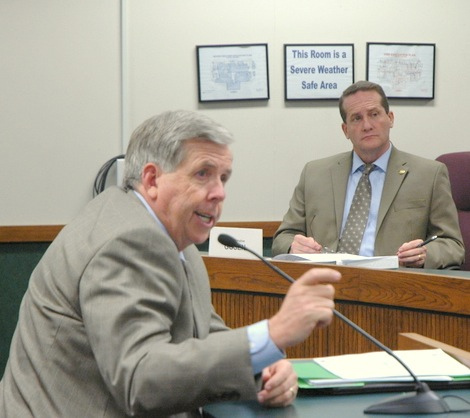
Parson in 2012

Parson was first elected to the 133rd District in the Missouri House of Representatives in 2004, and reelected in 2006 and 2008. During his tenure, he chaired the House Rules Committee. In 2007, Parson co-sponsored a bill to expand castle doctrine rights.

In 2010, Parson was elected to the Missouri Senate. He had signed the Americans for Tax Reform pledge not to raise any taxes. He served as the Senate majority whip during the 96th General Assembly. He was reelected in 2014, running unopposed in both the Republican primary and general election.

== Lieutenant governor of Missouri ==
=== Campaign ===
Parson initially announced he would run for governor in 2016, but opted to run for lieutenant governor instead. After defeating two opponents in the Republican primaries, he faced Democratic former U.S. Representative Russ Carnahan, whom he defeated in the general election on November 8, 2016.

During his campaign, Parson was criticized by his former chief of staff for allegedly proposing legislation on behalf of a lobbyist, and a $50,000 plan to employ a valet for his vehicle. Parson claimed his former staffer was a "disgruntled former employee".

=== Tenure ===
Parson was sworn in on January 9, 2017, along with Governor Eric Greitens. Noting that the lieutenant governor's office had not been upgraded in the past 12 years, Parson approved $54,000 in remodeling and renovation costs during his first two months in office.

In 2017, Parson sought a $125,000 increase to his $463,000 budget, which included $35,000 to reimburse him for travel mileage during state business. He also sought $10,000 for out-of-state travel. In 2018, he asked for an additional $25,000 to pay for a part-time personal driver but decreased his overall budget request to $541,000. In response to criticism, his office routinely stated that his office and salary was the smallest of any statewide elected Missouri official.

Parson was the only statewide elected official to accept gifts from a lobbyist in his first six months in office, reporting $2,752 in meals and gifts. Parson's predecessor, Peter Kinder, also accepted gifts.

After allegations of improper care at the Missouri Veterans Home in St. Louis, first reported by the St. Louis Post-Dispatch in October 2017, Parson's office launched an investigation.

On February 22, 2018, Greitens was indicted on felony invasion of privacy charges. The indictment came a month after Greitens disclosed an extramarital affair, which only increased speculation that Parson could succeed Greitens should he step aside or be removed.

==== Low-income housing tax credit industry ====
On December 19, 2017, Parson voted to keep a $140 million state tax credit intended for developers of low-income housing. Greitens had appointed members to the Missouri Housing Development Commission who opposed the Low-Income Housing Tax Credit (LIHTC) program, and had publicly called the program "a special interest scheme that makes insiders rich." Parson and then-state treasurer Eric Schmitt were the only members to vote to keep the tax credit. Before the commission's vote, Greitens had publicly opposed the tax credit, after a bipartisan audit of the program showed that only 42 cents of every dollar were being spent on low-income housing. In 2017, the Columbia Tribune reported that Parson and Schmitt were "among the top 10 Republican recipients developer contributions over the past 10 years."

== Governor of Missouri ==
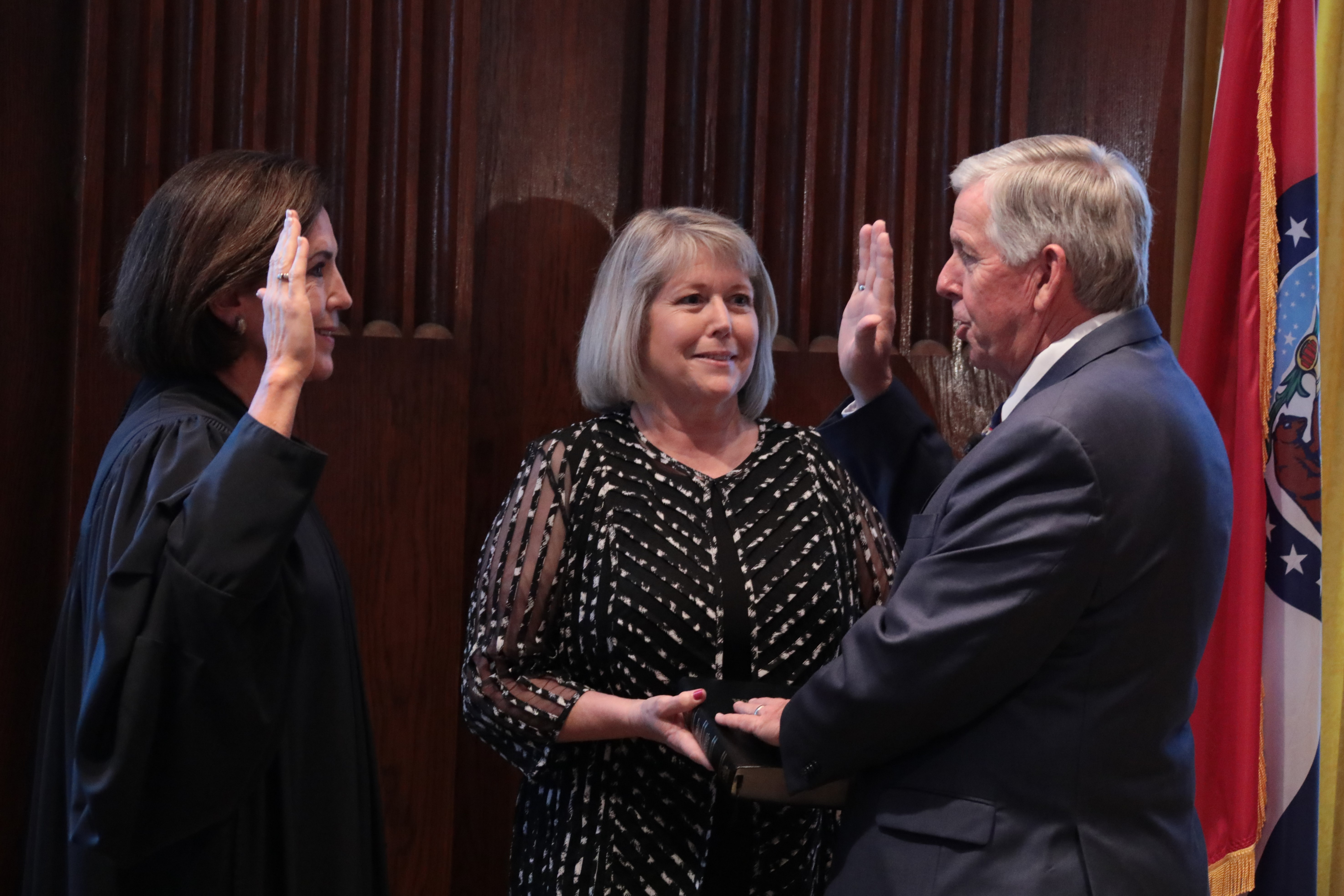
Parson being sworn in as Governor of Missouri in 2018 by Mary Rhodes Russell alongside his wife Teresa

On May 29, 2018, Greitens announced that he would resign effective at 5:00 pm on June 1, 2018. Parson was sworn in as governor half an hour later.

=== 2020 election ===
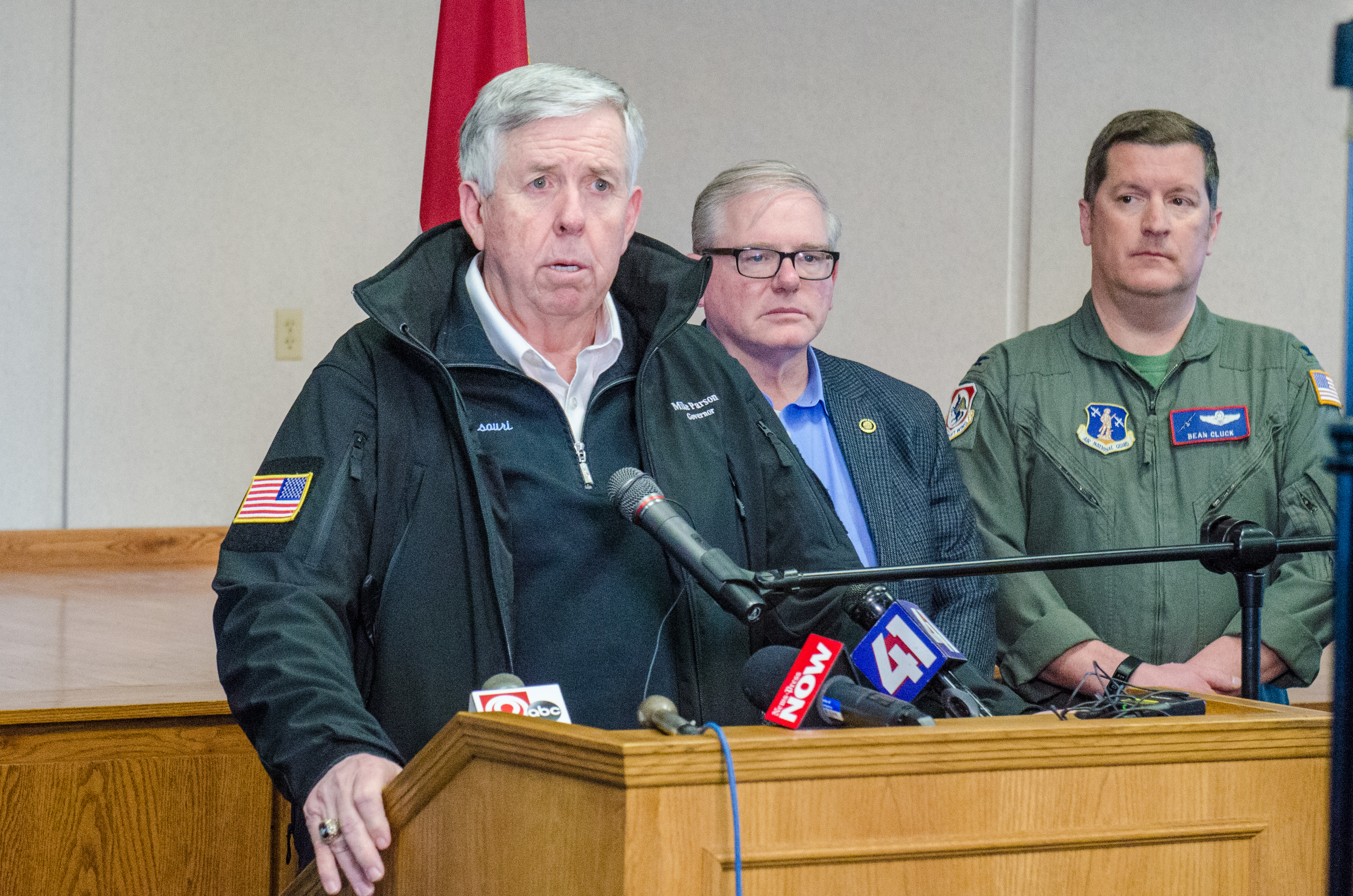
Parson at a press conference in 2019

After filing to run for his first full term in the 2020 gubernatorial election, Parson, when asked if he would plan to run for another term in 2024, said, "I don't see that in my future." Amid rumors that Greitens would run for governor again in 2020, Parson's team said they doubted Greitens would consider another gubernatorial campaign. The chairman of Parson's political action committee released a poll asking voters whether they would vote for Greitens or Parson in a Republican primary election. The chairman of the pro-Parson PAC, Uniting Missouri, said he did not expect Greitens to run.

After denying implementation of voting by mail in Missouri, when asked about voters who have concerns about going to a polling place amid the COVID-19 pandemic, Parson said such people should not vote.

Parson defeated state representative Jim Neely and Air Force veteran Saundra McDowell in the Republican primary on August 4, 2020, and Democratic nominee State Auditor Nicole Galloway in the November 3 general election.

=== Abortion ===
On May 24, 2019, Parson signed bill HB 126, known as the Missouri Stands for the Unborn Act, criminalizing abortions in Missouri after eight weeks of pregnancy. Under the law, anyone who performs an abortion after eight weeks could be charged with a Class B felony punishable by five to 15 years in prison. The bill, passed in both General Assembly chambers the week before after debate and protest, has no exceptions for victims of rape or incest, but does have an exclusion for medical emergencies. A federal judge blocked the law a day before it was to go into effect, but left an exception for the "reason ban" portion of the bill prohibiting abortions on the basis of race, sex, or diagnosis of Down Syndrome.

In October 2021, the Parson administration added a new rule that would allow state agencies to share health inspection reports about abortion providers with one another, which could make it easier for the state to withhold Medicaid funding from those providers.

=== Appointments ===
In June 2018, Parson appointed Missouri Senate Majority Leader Mike Kehoe lieutenant governor. The appointment came with legal uncertainty, as the Constitution of Missouri states: "The governor shall fill all vacancies in public offices unless otherwise provided by law" but a Missouri law stated that the governor can fill all vacancies "other than in the offices of lieutenant governor, state senator or representative, sheriff, or recorder of deeds in the city of St. Louis." The Missouri Democratic Party challenged the appointment in court and, in 2019, the Missouri Supreme Court ruled, in a 5–2 decision, that Parson had the legal authority to make the appointment.

In December 2018, Parson proposed repealing a voter-approved constitutional amendment to establish nonpartisan redistricting of state House and Senate districts. The Associated Press estimated that a nonpartisan redrawing of districts would likely increase Democrats' share of state House and Senate seats. At the same time, Parson expressed support for making it harder to put issues up for ballot referendum.

Parson appointed Robin Ransom to the Supreme Court of Missouri, the first African-American woman to serve on the Court.

In 2021, Parson demanded that David Steelman resign from the University of Missouri System Board of Curators after Steelman raised concerns of a conflict of interest on the part of university lobbyist and Parson adviser Steven Tilley. Steelman was the longest-serving curator on the board at the time, and opposed Parson's nomination of former Republican party leader Todd Graves. Parson broke a filibuster on Graves's appointment by making a deal with the Democrats, and replaced Steelman with real estate investor Keith Holloway.

In 2022, the Missouri Senate adjourned without considering the nomination of Donald Kauerauf as director of the Missouri Department of Health and Senior Services, effectively ousting him from that post. Some Senate Republicans had opposed Kauerauf's nomination because Kauerauf supported efforts to encourage Missourians to get vaccinated against COVID-19. In defending Kauerauf, Parson said he "would not have nominated someone who does not share the same Christian values" he holds. Parson's statement was criticized by many, including the Americans United for Separation of Church and State, interfaith groups, and State Representative Adam Schwadron, a Jewish Republican, who pointed to the No Religious Test Clause of the U.S. Constitution. After receiving blowback, Parson's spokesperson said the governor had no "litmus test for appointments".

In 2023, state Democrats called upon Parson to withdraw his appointment of Timothy Faber as chair of Missouri's Human Rights Commission after Faber testified against a LGBT anti-discrimination bill on behalf of his employer, Missouri Baptist Convention. Faber did not identify himself as member of the commission until questioned.

In 2024, Parson's support of Kehoe and Andrew Bailey attracted scrutiny in the run-up to state elections for lieutenant governor and attorney general. For a letter to the leadership of Republican Attorneys General Association about Bailey, Parson used official gubernatorial letterhead, potentially in violation of state law. Bailey also featured prominently in a 2023 advertisement paid for by the Department of Labor. Candidates for the 2024 gubernatorial election alleged that Parson leveraged a press conference to advance Kehoe's campaign.

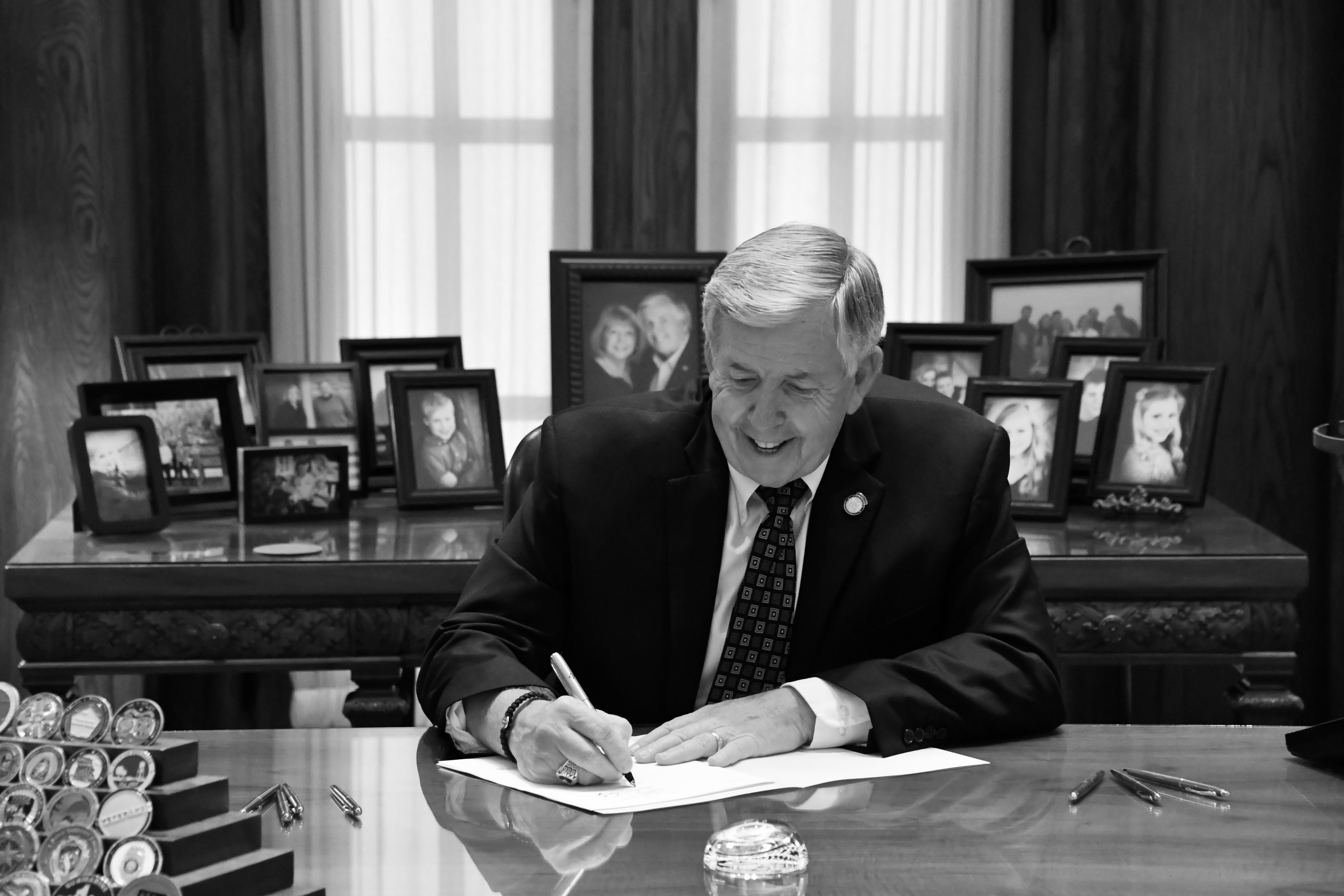
Parson signing a bill in 2019

=== Budget ===
Parson announced hundreds of vetoes to the state's 2024 operating budget, cutting $555.3 million. Lawmakers failed to override the vetoes and acceded to the cuts.

=== COVID-19 pandemic ===
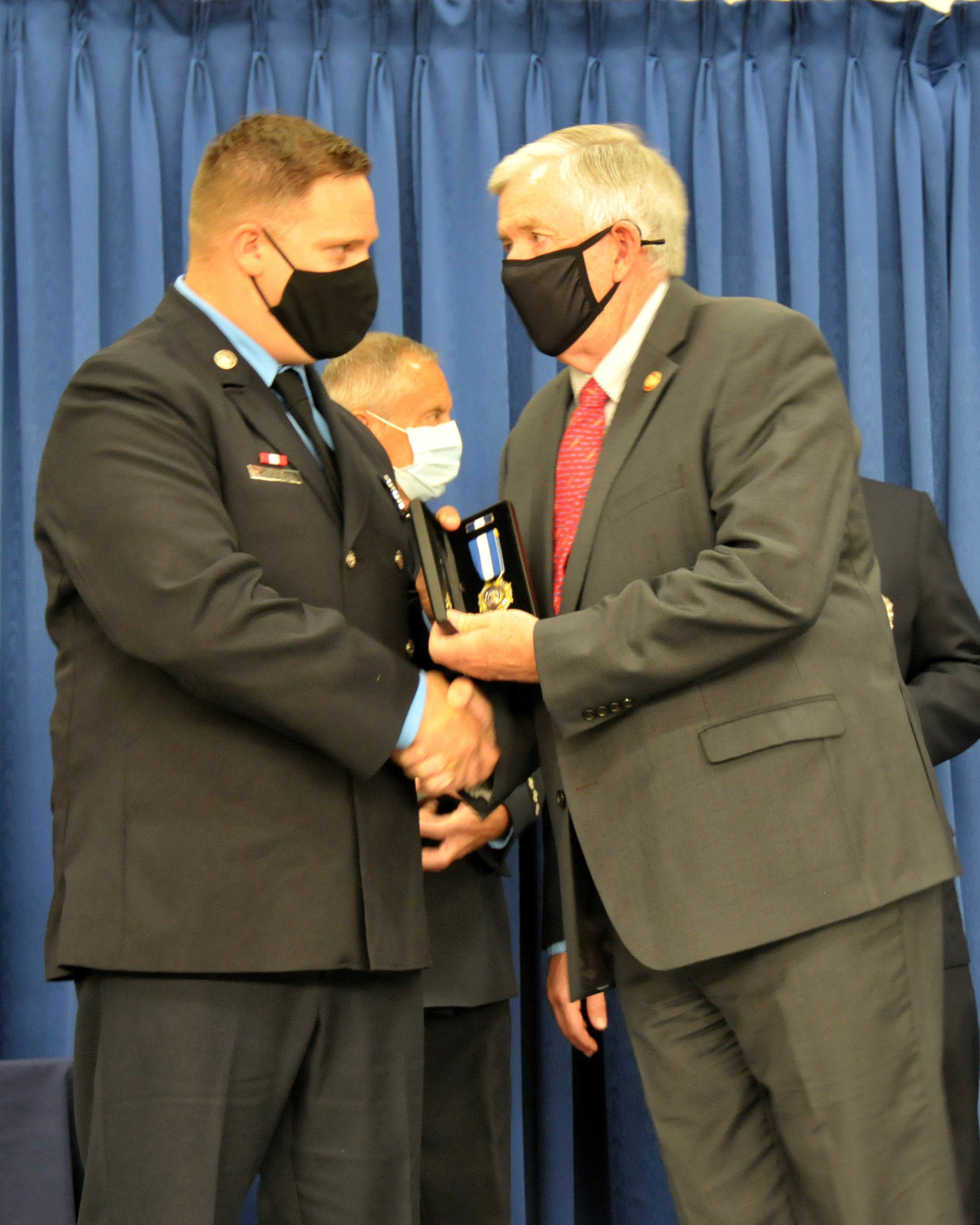
Parson wearing a face mask in October 2020

As of March 13, 2020, Parson had announced the first two known cases of COVID-19 in Missouri: one in St. Louis and one in Springfield, with both in self-quarantine. Parson said his administration had received $13 million in federal aid to combat the COVID-19 pandemic, and that of every test taken for the virus, only those two were positive. He said the virus was not spreading in Missouri. On March 17, he announced that Missouri had 15 confirmed cases. Parson said the state would expand to 10,000 tests per day by April 1 and would look into more protective measures for law enforcement and firefighters. He said that his declaration of a state of emergency in Missouri freed $7 million in funding to fight the virus. Despite the virus's contagiousness, Parson delegated the decision to close schools to school districts. After similar actions by Kansas Governor Laura Kelly, Parson announced that, effective 12:00 a.m. March 17, all Missouri casinos would close. He made this announcement after consulting the chair of the Missouri Gaming Commission. On March 21, Parson announced a new response plan to the pandemic, including a ban on gatherings of more than 10 people. The plan was set to go into effect at midnight on March 23 and end at midnight on April 6. The plan also banned dining in restaurants, allowing only takeout and drive-through.

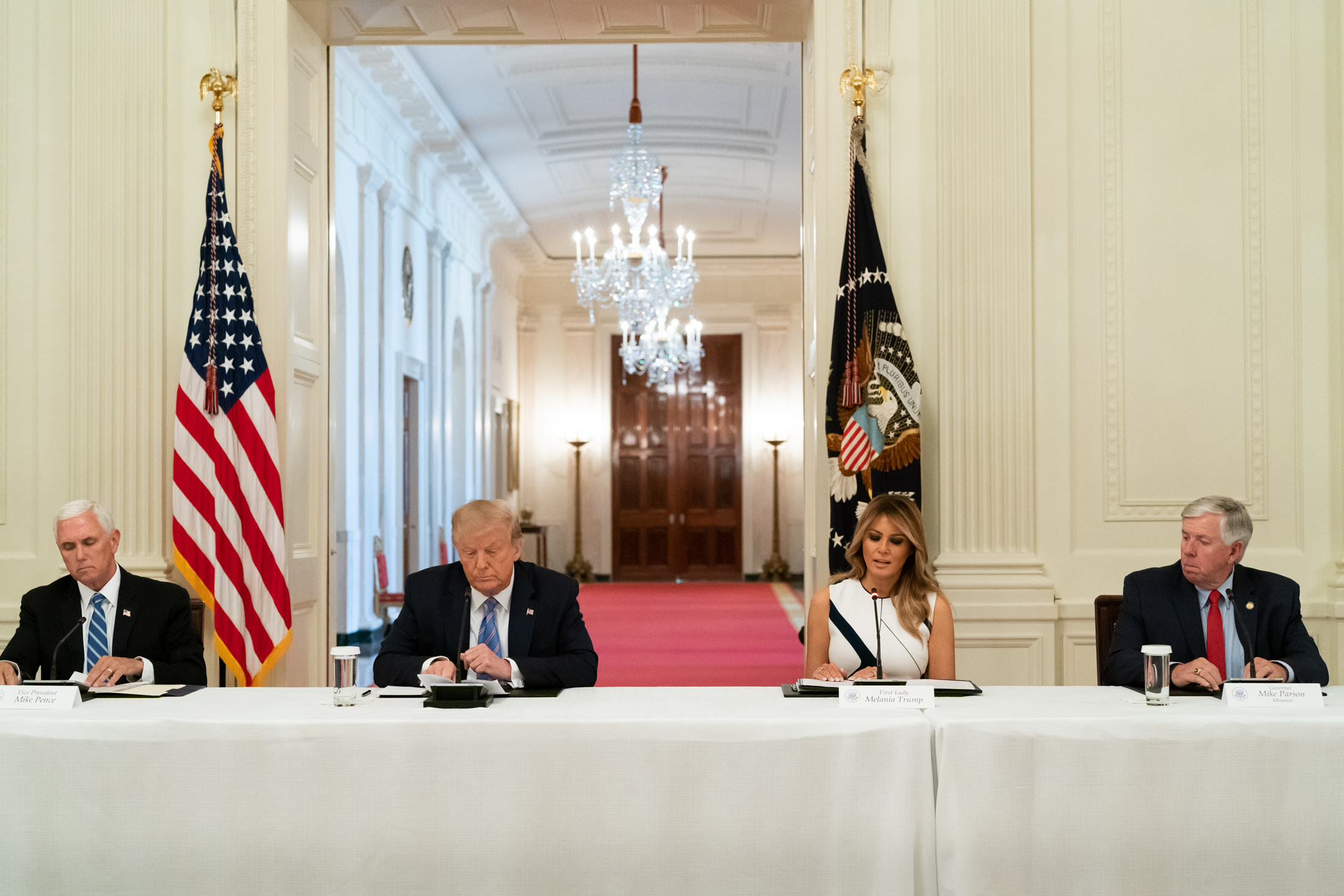
Parson (far right) at the White House in July 2020 with Vice President Mike Pence, President Donald Trump, and First Lady Melania Trump during an event encouraging school re-opening

After declining to close down Missouri, and rejecting demands from across the nation and the statewide health industry, while more than 1,500 new cases of COVID-19 had been confirmed in Missouri – one of ten states to remain open during the growing pandemic – and after St. Louis and Kansas City issued strict stay-at-home orders, Parson issued a general statewide stay-at-home order on April 3 to take effect three days later. The order was later extended to expire May 3, mirroring a similar extension by Kansas Governor Kelly. Parson simultaneously issued a statewide order closing public schools until the beginning of the new school year in the fall. Once the order expired, he delegated responsibility to the counties for enforcing social distancing as the state reopened, comparing the situation to local health departments monitoring restaurants.

In May 2020, Parson and four other Republican governors published an editorial in The Washington Post titled "Our states stayed open in the COVID-19 pandemic. Here's why our approach worked", though unlike the other signatories, Parson had initially supported a shutdown. In July 2020, Parson argued for the reopening of schools. He said schoolchildren "are at the lowest risk possible. And if they do get COVID-19, which they will—and they will when they go to school—they're not going to the hospitals [...] They're going to go home and they're going to get over it." He also strongly opposed mandating the wearing of face masks.

On September 23, 2020, Parson and his wife Teresa both tested positive for COVID-19, and they both announced "mild symptoms". In October 2020, Parson announced that he and his wife had both "fully recovered".

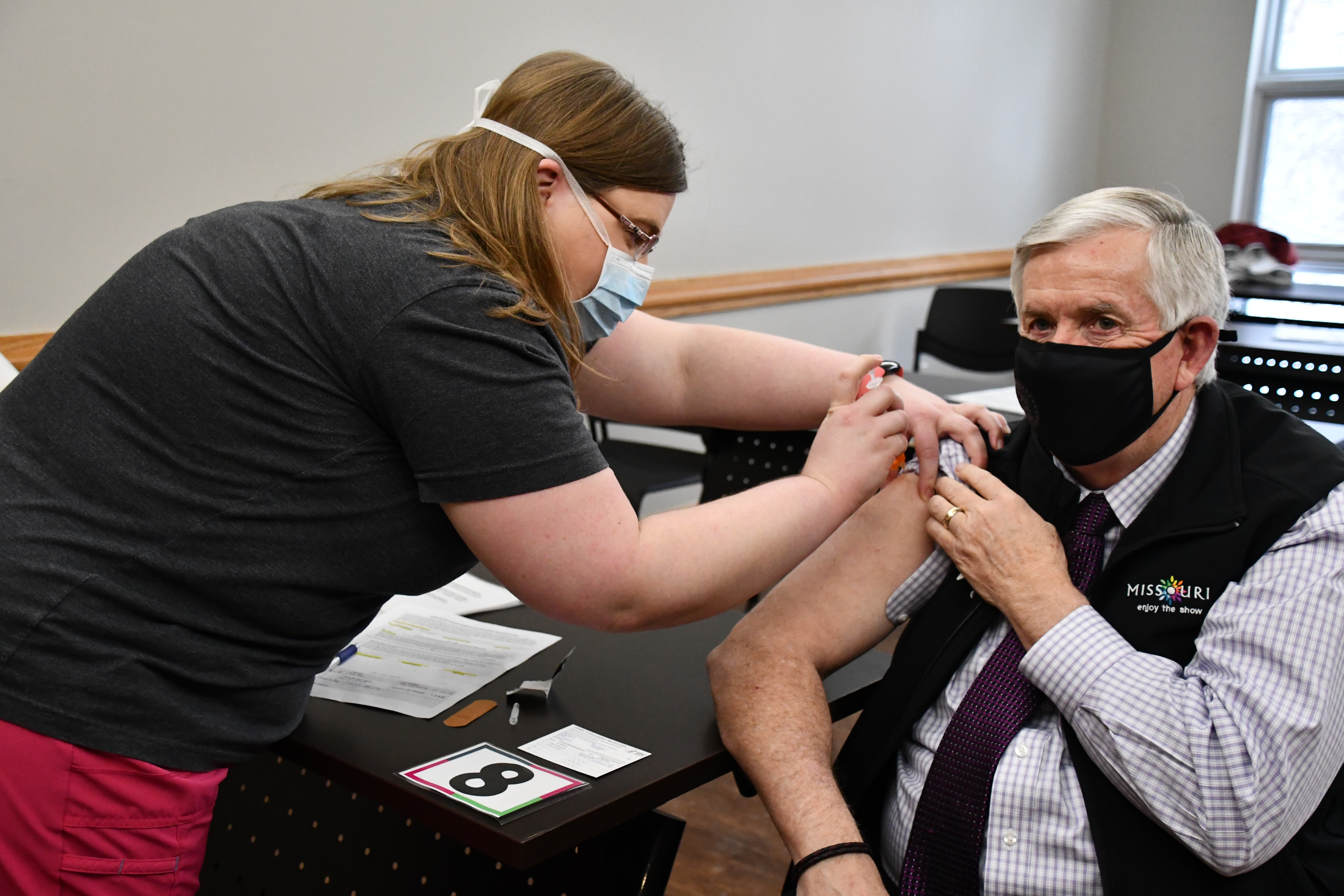
Parson receiving his COVID-19 vaccine in February 2021

In January 2021, Parson called up the Missouri National Guard to assist with the vaccination efforts, though he said that "Supply [of the vaccine] remains extremely limited."

In February 2021, a report by Deloitte commissioned by the state found expanding "vaccine deserts" in the Kansas City and St. Louis metropolitan areas. That same month, Missouri was ranked last out of all states in COVID-19 vaccine distribution, which Parson said would be "a struggle for months to come." The St. Louis Post-Dispatch reported that the St. Louis region was receiving less than half of the vaccinations that it should based on population, despite increased prevalence of COVID-19 in urban areas. In response, Mayor of St. Louis Lyda Krewson sent Parson and Director of the Missouri Department of Health and Senior Services Randall W. Williams a letter expressing her concern that the city would become "a COVID-19 vaccine desert". In response to the reports, Parson doubled down, attacking the report and Alex Garza, the head of the St. Louis Metropolitan Pandemic Task Force, who he said had cherry-picked data and was "spreading information, false information about the vaccine administration in the St. Louis area to once more spread fear and panic."

On June 15, 2021, Parson signed into law a bill banning "COVID-19 passports" and reducing local leaders' ability to make public health orders. The law limits orders made by local health agencies to 30 days, at which time an extension would require a declaration of emergency by the governor or, barring that, a two-thirds vote by the local governing board.

In July 2021, Parson announced a new statewide Vaccine Incentive Program, giving Missourians who received a COVID-19 vaccine a chance to win up to $10,000. As of September 2021, 550,000 doses of COVID vaccine had been administered since the start of the program.

In early November 2021, the Missouri Department of Health concluded a study on the effectiveness of mask mandates at the request of Parson, who has a history of criticizing local mask mandates. The study found that mask mandates reduced COVID-19 infections and deaths. Its results were not released publicly by the health department or included in Parson's cabinet meeting material. The information became publicly known in early December 2021 after a Missouri Independent Sunshine Law request. Parson subsequently argued that the study was wrong and his office said that the Department of Health had put "no time or research" into the analysis.

In November 2021, as a result of the Omicron variant of COVID-19, Parson decided to postpone a scheduled trade mission to Israel and Greece.

=== Death penalty ===
As governor, Parson never granted clemency in a death penalty case.

In April 2024, Parson denied clemency to Brian Dorsey, who pleaded guilty to a 2006 double murder. More than 70 prison workers had requested that Parson commute Dorsey's sentence due to his rehabilitation. Advocates for Dorsey, including jurors from his trial, legislators, and a former Missouri Supreme Court justice, also identified improper legal proceedings as a reason to commute Dorsey's sentence. Dorsey was executed by lethal injection.

In September 2024, Parson dissolved a board of inquiry that investigated whether death row inmate Marcellus Williams was innocent in the murder of Felicia Gayle in 1998. The local prosecutor from the office that convicted Williams had expressed support for overturning his guilty verdict. No forensic evidence linked Williams to the crime scene. The verdict relied heavily on testimony from two witnesses who Williams's defenders say had incentives to blame him; one allegedly wished to claim reward money, and the other was a jailhouse informant who bargained for a shorter prison sentence. Parson said it was "time to move forward" with the execution, saying another delay would be "deferring justice, leaving a victim's family in limbo, and solving nothing". Despite public outcry, Williams was executed on September 24, 2024.

=== Gun law ===
On June 14, 2021, Parson signed a bill banning local police departments from enforcing federal gun legislation, allowing those that do to be sued and fined $50,000. He signed the bill at a gun shop and shooting range. Two days later, the U.S. Department of Justice sent Parson a letter saying the law violated the Supremacy Clause, and O'Fallon, Missouri police chief Philip Dupuis resigned over the law, which he said would "decrease public safety and increase frivolous lawsuits designed to harass and penalize good hard-working law enforcement agencies". Democrats criticized the law, calling it unconstitutional. In response, Parson and Eric Schmitt contended that "Missouri is not attempting to nullify federal law".

The City of St. Louis, St. Louis County, and Jackson County sued the state, seeking to block the law. In February 2022, the U.S. Department of Justice also sued the state, arguing that the law unconstitutionally attempts to supersede federal law. On March 7, 2023, Federal District Court Judge Brian C. Wimes found that state law unconstitutional as a violation of the Supremacy Clause. Missouri Attorney General Andrew Bailey said he would challenge the decision and U.S. Representative Eric Burlison denigrated the decision as understandable because Wimes was appointed by President Barack Obama. Disappointed with Bailey's action, Kansas City Mayor Quinton Lucas said that Missouri officials had hoped that Bailey "would approach the office like a grown-up".

=== Low-income housing ===
After Greitens's resignation, Parson initially said that as governor he had no plans to restart the low-income tax credit. Parson has since appointed Lieutenant Governor Mike Kehoe, State Treasurer Scott Fitzpatrick, and Attorney General Eric Schmitt, all members of the commission. In May 2019, Parson announced his intention to restart the low income housing tax credit program. He also announced that he was considering calling a legislative special session to restart the program.

=== Medicaid expansion ===
Parson opposed the 2020 Missouri ballot referendum on Medicaid expansion, which would cost the state at least $130 million annually to receive $1.6 billion in federal funds. He argued that the referendum's lack of funding mechanism would harm the state budget, but promised to obey the vote results. In August 2020, after a decade of advocacy, Missouri voters approved the referendum to become the 37th state with Medicaid expansion effective July 1, 2021.

Regardless, on May 13, 2021, Parson declared denial of expansion, again blaming funding, so that the enhanced services and the 275,000 newly eligible citizens would not receive coverage. With the issue headed to court, and some state representatives claiming the state had more than enough funding, The Kansas City Star wrote, "The governor's directive was swiftly condemned as an anti-democratic dismissal of the will of the people." In July 2021, the Missouri Supreme Court settled the issue by ruling that the referendum did not violate state law, thus paving the way for expansion.

=== Operation Lone Star ===
Parson was among the 25 signatories to the Republican Governors Association's January 25, 2024, joint statement of support for Greg Abbott and his Operation Lone Star.

On February 20, 2024, Parson issued a press release announcing the deployment of 200 National Guard members and 22 Highway Patrol troopers to Texas's southern border. These actions were issued through Executive Order 24-03, along with a $2.3 million "supplemental budget request to the Missouri General Assembly to support border security efforts and backfill the Governor's Office's emergency response fund." Parson had visited the border two weeks earlier, and the Missouri State Highway Patrol seized nearly 12,500 grams of fentanyl in 2023 alone.

In June 2024, Parson vetoed funds for Operation Lone Star and reduced the state budget allocation to $2 million.

=== Pardons ===
Between 2020 and 2024, Parson granted clemency to more than 760 people (the most for any Missouri governor since the 1940s). Before his 2020 election, Parson issued very few pardons, but since then, he has begun issuing them monthly. As of June 2021, he had a backlog of about 3,000 requests for clemency.

In July 2020, Parson pledged to pardon Mark and Patricia McCloskey, a St. Louis couple who pointed guns at unarmed George Floyd protesters walking past their home on a private street, if they were convicted of crimes and if there was no significant change in the facts as they were understood at the time. In August 2021, he pardoned the McCloskeys after they pleaded guilty to misdemeanor fourth-degree assault and misdemeanor harassment.

In June 2021, Parson declined to pardon Kevin Strickland, an African-American man imprisoned for triple murder since 1978, saying it was not a "priority". Strickland, who had been convicted by an all-white jury, had maintained his innocence, and the case's prosecutor said she believes him to be innocent. He had become the subject of a bipartisan clemency petition by state lawmakers, and several judges and other politicians had called for his release. In November 2021, a judge set aside the conviction and Strickland was released. Parson also refused to pardon Lamar Johnson, an African-American man convicted for murder on the basis of one eyewitness's testimony; a conviction integrity unit later found that there was overwhelming evidence of his innocence. Critics contrasted Parson's decision to decline to pardon Strickland with his decision to pardon the McCloskeys.

In 2024, Parson shortened the sentence of former Kansas City Chiefs assistant coach Britt Reid, son of Chiefs Coach Andy Reid, who had been sentenced to three years in prison for causing a crash that seriously injured a five-year old girl while driving drunk at about 84 mph in a 65 mph zone. Parson converted the sentence to house arrest. Parson is a longtime Chiefs season-ticket holder.

In December 2024, Parson commuted the sentence of former Kansas City police detective Eric DeValkenaere, who shot a black man to death when the victim was backing his pickup truck into his garage. The commutation placed DeValkenaere on parole.

=== Threat to prosecute St. Louis Post-Dispatch reporter ===
On October 14, 2021, the St. Louis Post-Dispatch reported that a flaw on a Missouri Department of Elementary and Secondary Education (DESE) website exposed the Social Security numbers (SSNs) of over 100,000 DESE administrators, counselors, and teachers by embedding them in the website's public source code. The Post-Dispatch notified DESE of the flaw and delayed the publication of its story "to give the department time to take steps to protect teachers' private information, and to allow the state to ensure no other agencies' web applications contained similar vulnerabilities." DESE initially wanted to thank the Post-Dispatch for bringing the vulnerability to light. Instead, Parson announced that the Missouri State Highway Patrol would investigate "all of those involved"; vowed to seek criminal prosecution of the journalist who reported the story, Josh Renaud (calling him a "hacker"); and said his administration would prosecute "any and all perpetrators who attempt to steal personal information and harm Missourians." Parson claimed Renaud wanted to "embarrass the state and sell headlines for their news outlet"; called his reporting a "crime against Missouri teachers"; and pledged to prosecute "all those who aided this individual and the media corporation that employs them."

In February 2022, the Missouri State Highway Patrol released a 158-page report, concluding (after 175 hours of investigation) that Renaud had accessed only publicly available information and had committed no wrongdoing, and the Cole County Prosecuting Attorney brought no charges. DESE officials, as well as the State Highway Patrol investigation, determined that the flaw in the DESE website that publicly exposed the SSNs of 576,000 teachers had been in place for a decade (since 2011) until it was fixed after Renaud's reporting. A DESE official said that the website with the vulnerability had been "developed and maintained by the Office of Administration's Information Technology Services Division (ITSD)—which the governor's office controls directly." The report vindicated Renaud and University of Missouri-St. Louis professor Shaji Khan, who helped confirm the existence of the security lapse for the Post-Dispatch and was also a target of Parson's prosecution threat.

State and federal legislators, including State Representative Tony Lovasco and U.S. Senator Ron Wyden, criticized Parson's response, with Lovasco tweeting that "the governor's office has a fundamental misunderstanding of both web technology and industry-standard procedures for reporting security vulnerabilities." The National Press Club called Parson's targeting of Renaud a "particularly egregious" example of public officials who attacked the press, and honored Renaud with the Club's 2022 John Aubuchon Press Freedom Award.

== Personal life ==
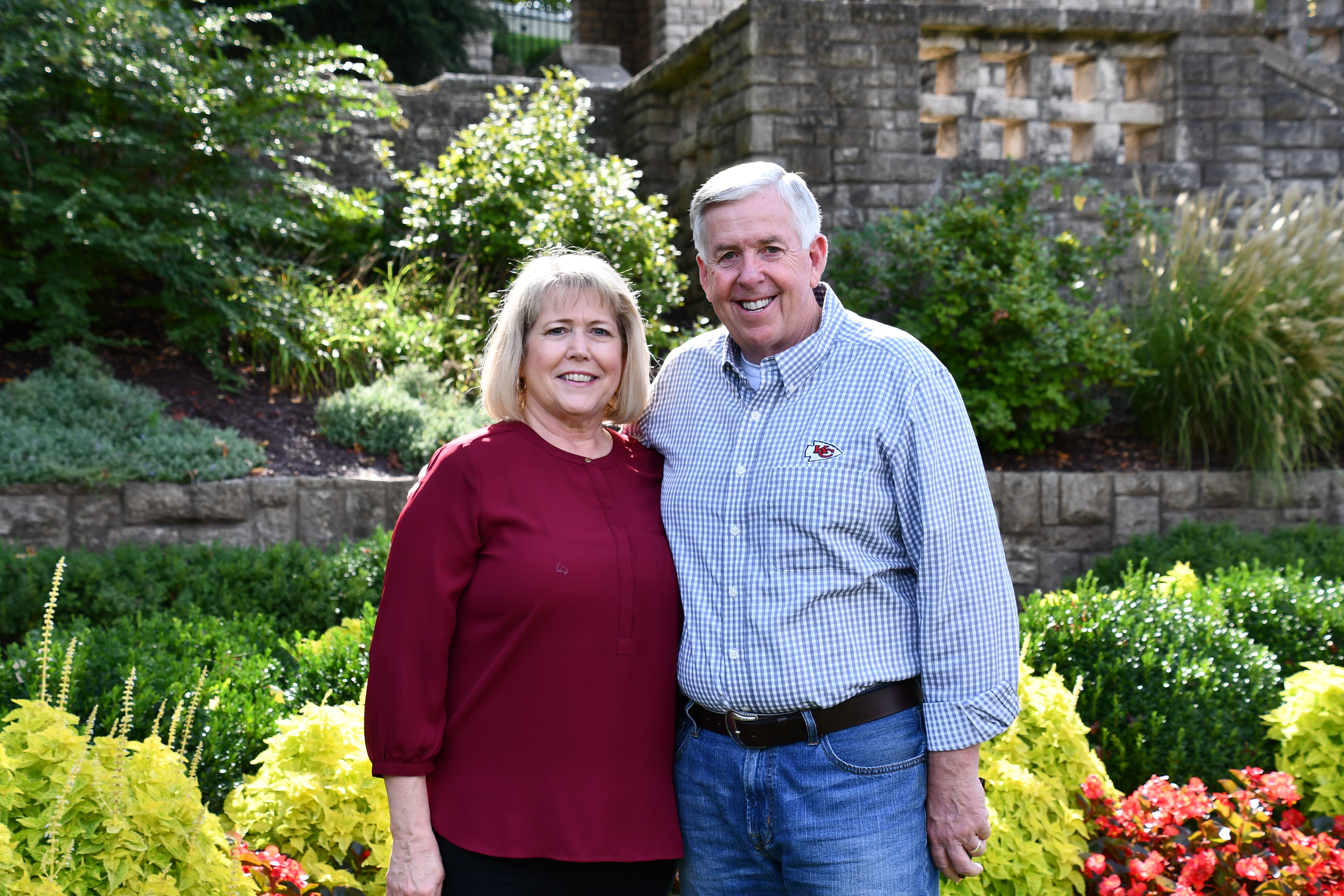
Mike and Teresa Parson in 2020

Parson married his wife, Teresa, in 1985. They have two children. During Parson's term as governor, the couple has lived at the Missouri Governor's Mansion in Jefferson City, except for several months in 2019 when the mansion was undergoing renovations. The couple's personal residence is in Bolivar.

A third-generation farmer, Parson started a cow and calf operation near Bolivar in 1985, which he still owns and operates.

Parson is a Baptist.

== Electoral history ==
=== State representative ===
Missouri State Representative Primary Election, District 133, August 3, 2004
Party	Candidate	Votes	%	±%
Republican	Mike Parson	3,464	44.08	
Republican	Sam Alexander	2,225	28.32	
Republican	Tom Stark	2,017	25.67	
Republican	Mike Harman	152	1.93	

Missouri State Representative General Election, District 133, November 2, 2004
Party	Candidate	Votes	%	±%
Republican	Mike Parson	11,471	74.70	
Democratic	Marvalene Pankey	3,197	20.82	
Libertarian	F. Troy Watson	689	4.48	

- Unopposed for the primary and general elections in District 133 in 2006 and 2008.

=== State senator ===
Missouri 28th District State Senator Republican Primary 2010
Party	Candidate	Votes	%	±%
Republican	Mike Parson	14,518	47.4%	
Republican	Larry Wilson	9,590	31.3%	
Republican	Ed Emery	6,533	21.3%	

Missouri 28th District State Senator General Election 2010
Party	Candidate	Votes	%	±%
Republican	Mike Parson	47,380	83.7%	
Constitution	Bennie B. Hatfield	9,213	16.3%	

- Unopposed for the 28th District seat in 2014

=== Lieutenant governor ===
Missouri Lieutenant Governor Republican Primary 2016
Party	Candidate	Votes	%	±%
Republican	Mike Parson	331,367	51.505%	
Republican	Bev Randles	282,134	43.852%	
Republican	AC Dienoff	29,872	4.643%	

Missouri Lieutenant Governor Election 2016
Party	Candidate	Votes	%	±%
Republican	Mike Parson	1,495,392	52.9%	
Democratic	Russ Carnahan	1,168,947	42.3%	
Libertarian	Steven R. Hedrick	69,253	2.5%	
Green	Jennifer Leach	66,490	2.405%	

=== Governor ===
Missouri gubernatorial primary election, August 4, 2020
Party	Candidate	Votes	%	±%
Republican	Mike Parson (incumbent)	511,566	74.93	
Republican	Saundra McDowell	84,412	12.36	
Republican	Jim Neely	59,514	8.72	
Republican	Raleigh Ritter	27,264	3.99	

Missouri gubernatorial election, 2020
Party	Candidate	Votes	%	±%
Republican	Mike Parson (incumbent)	1,720,202	57.11%	+5.97%
Democratic	Nicole Galloway	1,225,771	40.69%	−4.88%
Libertarian	Rik Combs	49,067	1.63%	+0.16%
Green	Jerome Bauer	17,234	0.57%	−0.18%
Write-in		13	0.00%	±0.00%
Total votes		3,012,287	100.00%	
Republican hold				

Party political offices
Preceded by Peter Kinder	Republican nominee for Lieutenant Governor of Missouri; 2016	Succeeded by Mike Kehoe
Preceded by Eric Greitens	Republican nominee for Governor of Missouri; 2020	Succeeded by Mike Kehoe
Political offices
Preceded by Peter Kinder	Lieutenant Governor of Missouri; 2017–2018	Succeeded by Mike Kehoe
Preceded by Eric Greitens	Governor of Missouri; 2018–2025	Succeeded by Mike Kehoe
U.S. order of precedence (ceremonial)
Preceded by Eric Greitens as Former Governor	Order of precedence of the United States; Within Missouri	Succeeded by Jack Markell as Former Governor
Preceded by Eric Greitens as Former Governor	Order of precedence of the United States; Outside Missouri	Succeeded by Mike Huckabee as Former Governor
