= Sue Entlicher =

American politician

Member of the Missouri House of Representatives from the 128th district
- In office January 9, 2013 – January 4, 2017
- Preceded by: Charlie Davis
- Succeeded by: Mike Stephens

Member of the Missouri House of Representatives from the 133rd district
- In office January 5, 2011 – January 9, 2013
- Preceded by: Mike Parson
- Succeeded by: Eric Burlison

Personal details
- Born: December 28, 1950 (age 75) Hoisington, Kansas
- Party: Republican

Sue Entlicher (born December 28, 1950) is an American politician who served in the Missouri House of Representatives from 2011 to 2017.
