= Russ Carnahan =

American politician (born 1958)

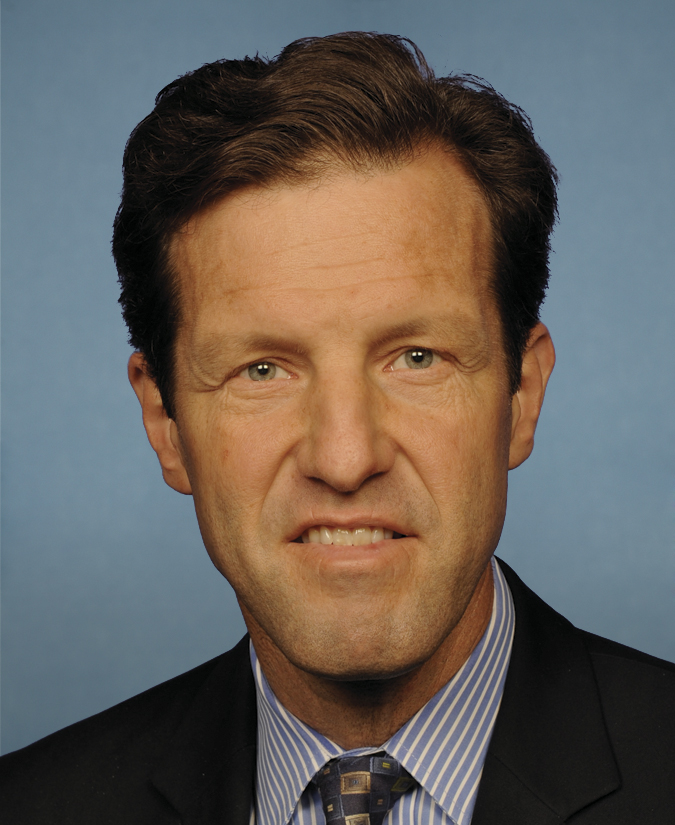

Chair of the Missouri Democratic Party
- Incumbent
- Assumed office March 18, 2023
- Preceded by: Michael Butler

Member of the U.S. House of Representatives from Missouri's 3rd district
- In office January 3, 2005 – January 3, 2013
- Preceded by: Dick Gephardt
- Succeeded by: Lacy Clay (redistricted)

Member of the Missouri House of Representatives from the 59th district
- In office January 2001 – January 2005
- Preceded by: Ron Auer
- Succeeded by: Jeanette Mott Oxford

Personal details
- Born: John Russell Carnahan; July 10, 1958 (age 68) Columbia, Missouri, U.S.
- Party: Democratic
- Spouse: Debra Goetz
- Parents: Mel Carnahan (father); Jean Carpenter (mother)
- Relatives: Carnahan family
- Education: University of Missouri (BA, JD)

John Russell Carnahan (/ˈkɑːrnəhæn/; born July 10, 1958) is an American politician from the state of Missouri. A member of the Democratic Party, he served as the U.S. representative for Missouri's 3rd congressional district from 2005 to 2013.

At the time, the district included the southern third of the city of St. Louis (known as South City) and most of the southern St. Louis suburbs including most of Jefferson County and all of Ste. Genevieve County. Some cities located in the district include: Webster Groves, Mehlville, Affton, and Oakville, and the southern suburbs of Arnold, Herculaneum, Pevely, Crystal City, Barnhart, Imperial, and Festus, as well as Ste. Genevieve in the neighboring Ste. Genevieve County.

Dramatic losses in population in St. Louis in the 2010 Census contributed to Missouri losing a Congressional seat effective 2013. In the re-mapping of the state's congressional districts, Carnahan's district was dismantled. The bulk of the district, including Carnahan's home, was drawn into Missouri's 1st congressional district. The move placed Carnahan and William Lacy Clay Jr. in the same district; Carnahan lost the primary to Clay for the seat on August 7, 2012.

As of 2023, he is the Chair of the Missouri Democratic Party.

== Early life, education and career ==
John Russell Carnahan was born in 1958 in Columbia, Missouri, and raised in Rolla. He is the son of the late Mel Carnahan, the former Governor of Missouri and posthumous U.S. Senator-elect, and Jean Carnahan (née Carpenter), who was appointed to the U.S. Senate to fill the seat to which her husband was posthumously elected.

His grandfather, A. S. J. Carnahan, served in Congress for seven terms, and also as U.S. Ambassador to Sierra Leone. Russ Carnahan is a recipient of the Eagle Scout Award. His sister Robin Carnahan was elected to the office of secretary state in 2004 and again in 2008 in which she received the most votes cast for a single candidate in the state's history. His brother Randy was killed in the same plane crash that took the life of his father. Russ Carnahan received a bachelor's degree and a Juris Doctor degree from the University of Missouri. He worked as a private practice attorney prior to entering politics.

== U.S. House of Representatives ==
=== Committee assignments ===
- Committee on Foreign Affairs
  - Subcommittee on Africa, Global Health, and Human Rights
  - Subcommittee on Oversight and Investigations (Ranking Member)
- Committee on Transportation and Infrastructure
  - Subcommittee on Aviation
  - Subcommittee on Economic Development, Public Buildings and Emergency Management
  - Subcommittee on Water Resources and Environment
- Committee on Veterans' Affairs
  - Subcommittee on Health

=== Caucus memberships ===
- American Engagement Caucus
- Congressional Biomass Caucus
- International Conservation Caucus
- Sportsmen's Caucus
- New Democrat Coalition

== Political positions ==
=== Crime ===
In the 2008 Missouri Congressional Political Courage Test, Carnahan supported the use of the death penalty in federal crimes. He also supported strict penalties for internet crime, such as hacking identity theft. However, he also supported programs to provide inmates with job-related skills and job-placement assistance when released. In addition, Carnahan supported programs to provide prison inmates with drug and alcohol addiction treatment. He supported the requirement that crimes based on sexual orientation should be prosecuted as federal hate crimes.

=== Economy & Jobs ===
In 2009, Carnahan voted for the American Recovery and Reinvestment Act of 2009. Missouri Republicans criticized Carnahan's vote, noting that passage of the bill resulted in $107 million in federal funding for Lost Creek Wind Farm, an alternative energy facility owned by Russ Carnahan's brother, Tom Carnahan.

=== Environment & Energy ===
Carnahan supported the regulation and enforcements of both the Clean Air and Clean Water Act. He supported further development and use of alternative fuels as well as the development of traditional energy resources, such as coal and natural gas. Carnahan also wanted to strengthen emission controls on all gasoline and diesel-powered engines, including cars, trucks, and SUVs. He has supported tax credits to consumers and manufacturers of hybrid vehicles. In addition, he supported international voluntary and mandatory emission targets to limit global warming. Carnahan has supported the interests of groups trying to protect the environment, such as the Defenders of Wildlife Action Fund. Russ Carnahan voted in favor of H.R. 2454: American Clean Energy and Security Act of 2009 also known as the Cap and Trade bill or Waxman/Markey act.

=== Health ===
Recently, Carnahan voted against a Health Care and Insurance Law amendment that would prohibit federal funding of abortion services. He supports the interests of pro-choice groups such as Planned Parenthood and NARAL Pro-Choice America. Carnahan wants tax credits to be offered to individuals and small businesses to offset the cost of insurance. He also supports the importation of prescription drugs to the U.S., and wants to expand prescription drug coverage under Medicare so that more people can be covered. Carnahan would also like child healthcare programs to be expanded so that more children can be covered. Carnahan voted in favor of H.R. 3962: Affordable Health Care for America Act in 2009,

=== Foreign Policy ===
In January 2010, Carnahan partnered with Republican Congressman Joseph Cao of Louisiana to create the American Engagement Caucus, its stated purpose being the promotion of a multilateral foreign policy in which the United States works closely with other countries to address global problems. As a joint editorial between the two congressmen stated, "We live in an age of interdependence. America's security, economic, environmental, and moral interests are inextricably linked with those of the international community. Simply put, it is in our vital national interest to support international engagement.". He has since introduced multiple other bills related to science diplomacy.

=== Guns ===
The NRA Political Victory Fund (NRA-PVF) rated Carnahan an "F" in 2004 and 2010,. Robin Carnahan, Russ's sister also has an F rating with the NRA-PVF, who backed her opponent in the 2004 election for Missouri Secretary of State. In 2016 during his run for Lt. Governor, Carnahan said,"I'm a member of the NRA as well as a Democrat. Democrat or Republican, no decision is going to be made to be harmful to the people."

== Political campaigns ==
Carnahan's first campaign for political office was in 1990, when he unsuccessfully ran for Congress in the 8th Congressional District against Republican U.S. Representative Bill Emerson, losing by 14 points, 57% to 43%. His grandfather had previously represented much of this district's western portion for all but two years from 1947 to 1961.

Prior to challenging Emerson, by his own telling the then-32-year-old Carnahan had already "been active in government and politics for most of my adult life." Carnahan was active in several of his late father's political campaigns, including successful bids for state treasurer (1980) and lieutenant governor (1988), and an unsuccessful race for governor (1984). In January 1980, Carnahan slept for five days on the floor outside the Secretary of State's Office in the Missouri State Capitol in Jefferson City, to ensure that his father's name would be first on the ballot for Missouri State Treasurer when filing opened on January 8. Said Carnahan, "A lot of people get football tickets this way. It's going to be a long five days, so I guess we'll get some sleeping bags and a TV in here." And in 1984, when his father ran for state treasurer, Carnahan made stump speeches for him across Missouri. Carnahan also had already worked for Missouri House Speaker Bob F. Griffin, Missouri Secretary of State Jim Kirkpatrick, and Missouri House Majority Leader Tony Ribaudo; had served on the executive committee of the Missouri Democratic Party; and, was the deputy Missouri campaign manager for Dick Gephardt's 1988 presidential campaign.

In his race against Emerson, one newspaper remarked "on Carnahan's tactics of deliberate misinformation and distortion of facts" and his "negative and demagogic approach to the 8th District race." The Sikeston Standard-Democrat said, "Democrat Russ Carnahan has brought more mud into a congressional campaign than the days of Bill D. Burlison." According to the Rolla Daily News, "We have already heard enough from Carnahan, whose loose interpretation of Mr. Emerson's record is grossly misleading. Mostly B.S., in other words. Couple that with Carnahan's wild accusations of what Emerson is to be blamed for, and I wouldn't be surprised if Carnahan doesn't soon attribute Missouri's recent fifth-down loss to Colorado to Emerson." Responding to this criticism, Carnahan alleged "that the Sowers family, which publishes the Rolla Daily News, has endorsed Emerson because the congressman rents district office space from the family." The Southeast Missourian described Carnahan's claim as "amateurish." In the final days of the campaign, "frustrated by ads being run by [Emerson]," Carnahan "lashed back by calling Emerson a 'damn liar.'" Emerson defeated Carnahan, 57% to 43%.

Carnahan considered running against Emerson again in 1994, but ultimately "decided 1994 was not the time." He then moved to St. Louis, where in 2000 he was elected to the Missouri House of Representatives. He narrowly defeated political activist Jeanette Mott Oxford in the Democratic primary election by a scant 64 votes but went on to win the general election by a wide margin. He was reelected to the Missouri House of Representatives in 2002.

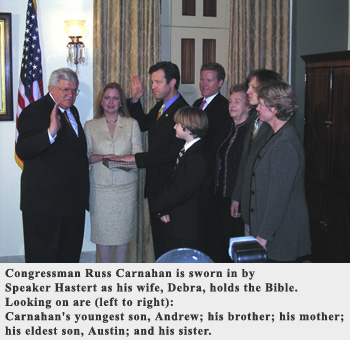
Carnahan being sworn in, 2005.

=== 2004 ===
In 2004, Carnahan ran for the 3rd Congressional District seat in the U.S. House of Representatives which was vacated by retiring U.S. Representative and former House Minority Leader and co-founder of the New Democratic Coalition Dick Gephardt. Carnahan narrowly won a crowded primary field of ten Democratic candidates in 2004 with 22.9 percent of the vote, finishing with less than 1,800 votes ahead of his nearest rival, political activist Jeff Smith, who garnered 21.3 percent. In the general election Carnahan faced Republican candidate William J. Federer, an author and Religious Right activist who had previously run against Gephardt on several occasions. The election was somewhat closer than expected. However, St. Louis's strong Democratic tilt (a Republican had not represented this district or its predecessors since 1953) helped Carnahan win with 53 percent of the vote. The district reverted to form in 2006 and Carnahan was reelected with 65 percent of the vote.

=== 2010 ===
Carnahan won re-election over Republican nominee Edward Martin Jr., Constitution Party nominee Nick Ivanovich, and Libertarian nominee Steven Hedrick. Brian Wallner qualified as a write-in candidate.

=== 2012 ===
During his time in Congress, Carnahan represented the southern third of St. Louis City, as well as much of southern St. Louis County and all of Jefferson and Ste. Genevieve counties. However, Missouri was due to lose a district after the 2010 census revealed sluggish population growth in Missouri, particularly in St. Louis.

On May 4, 2011, the Missouri Legislature overrode Governor Jay Nixon's veto of the proposed elimination of the 3rd District, by a 109-44 vote in the Missouri House, and 28-6 in the Missouri Senate. The new map merged all of St. Louis, including Carnahan's home, into the 1st District, represented by six-term Democrat Lacy Clay.

Carnahan challenged Clay in the primary for the redrawn 1st on August 7, 2012–the real contest in this heavily Democratic district–and lost by a landslide, 63% to 34%.

Carnahan was mentioned as a possible candidate to fill a vacancy in the 8th District after Rep. Jo Ann Emerson stepped down in 2013.

=== 2016 ===
Carnahan was the unsuccessful Democratic nominee for lieutenant governor. "Many of you have consistently encouraged me to continue serving our state in new ways — especially at a time when so many of our state officials are so very disconnected from the everyday needs and aspirations of Missourians," he wrote. He lost the general election to Republican Mike Parson.

== Electoral history ==
Missouri's 8th congressional district results: 1990
Year	Republican	Votes	Pct	Democratic	Votes	Pct
1990	Bill Emerson	81,452	57.3%	Russ Carnahan	60,751	42.7%

Missouri's 3rd congressional district results: 2004–2010
Year	Democratic	Votes	Pct	Republican	Votes	Pct	3rd Party	Party	Votes	Pct	3rd Party	Party	Votes	Pct	
2004	Russ Carnahan	146,894	52.9%	Bill Federer	125,422	45.1%	Kevin C. Babcock	Libertarian	4,367	1.6%	William J. Renaud	Constitution	1,222	0.4%	*
2006	Russ Carnahan	145,219	65.6%	David Bertelsen	70,189	31.7%	R. Christophel	Libertarian	4,213	1.7%	David Sladky	Progressive	1,827	0.8%	
2008	Russ Carnahan	202,470	66.4%	Chris Sander	92,759	30.4%	Kevin C. Babcock	Libertarian	5,518	1.8%	Cynthia L. Redburn	Constitution	4,324	1.4%	
2010	Russ Carnahan	99,398	48.9%	Ed Martin	94,757	46.7%	Steven R. Hedrick	Libertarian	5,772	2.8%	Nicholas J. Ivanovich	Constitution	3,155	1.6%	

Write-in and minor candidate notes: In 2004, Joseph L. Badaracco received 11 votes. In 2010, Brian Wallner received 3 votes.

Missouri's 1st congressional district primary election results: 2012
Year	Democratic	Votes	Pct	Democratic	Votes	Pct	Democratic	Votes	Pct
2012	Lacy Clay	57,791	63.3%	Russ Carnahan	30,943	33.9%	Candice Britton	2,570	2.8%

Lieutenant Governor of Missouri election results: 2016
year	Republican	Votes	Pct	Democratic	Votes	Pct	Libertarian	Votes	Pct	Green	Votes	Pct	
2016	Mike Parson	1,459,392	52.8%	Russ Carnahan	1,168,947	42.3%	Steven R. Hedrick	69,253	2.5%	Jennifer Leach	66,490	2.4%	*

Write in notes: Jake Wilburn received 87 votes.

U.S. House of Representatives
Preceded by Dick Gephardt	Member of the U.S. House of Representatives from Missouri's 3rd congressional district 2005–2013	Succeeded by Blaine Luetkemeyer
Party political offices
Preceded by Susan Montee	Democratic nominee for Lieutenant Governor of Missouri; 2016	Succeeded by Alissia Canady
Preceded by Michael Butler	Chair of the Missouri Democratic Party; 2023–present	Incumbent
U.S. order of precedence (ceremonial)
Preceded by Pat Danner as Former U.S. Representative	Order of precedence of the United States as Former U.S. Representative	Succeeded by William Brodhead as Former U.S. Representative
