= Randy Williams (disambiguation) =

Randy Williams (born 1953) is a retired American track and field athlete who was inducted into the National Track and Field Hall of Fame in 2009.

Randy Williams may also refer to:

- Randy Williams (baseball) (born 1975), an American former professional baseball pitcher
- Randy Williams (DJ), better known as R Dub!, an American DJ and traveler

== See also ==
- Randall Williams (disambiguation)
