= Mike Stephens (politician) =

American politician

Member of the Missouri House of Representatives from the 128th District
- In office 2017–2025
- Preceded by: Sue Entlicher
- Succeeded by: Christopher Warwick

Personal details
- Party: Republican

Michael Stephens is an American politician who was a member of Missouri House of Representatives from Missouri's 128th district from 2017 to 2025. He won the seat after defeating Independent candidate Janet Sheffield 85.5% to 14.5%.

== Electoral history ==
=== State representatives ===
Missouri House of Representatives Primary Election, August 2, 2016, District 128
Party	Candidate	Votes	%	±%
Republican	Mike Stephens	3,959	50.87%	
Republican	Roy Harms	2,189	28.13%	
Republican	Rick Vance	1,635	21.01%	
Total votes		7,783	100.00%	

Missouri House of Representatives Election, November 8, 2016, District 128
Party	Candidate	Votes	%	±%
Republican	Mike Stephens	13,804	85.46%	
Independent	Janet Sheffield	2,349	14.54%	
Total votes		16,153	100.00%	

Missouri House of Representatives Election, November 6, 2018, District 128
Party	Candidate	Votes	%	±%
Republican	Mike Stephens	11,153	79.34%	−6.12
Democratic	Rich Horton	2,904	20.66%	+20.66
Total votes		14,057	100.00%	

Missouri House of Representatives Election, November 3, 2020, District 128
Party	Candidate	Votes	%	±%
Republican	Mike Stephens	14,748	81.66%	+2.32
Democratic	Marvin Manring	3,312	18.34%	−2.32
Total votes		18,060	100.00%	

Missouri House of Representatives Election, November 8, 2022, District 128
Party	Candidate	Votes	%	±%
Republican	Mike Stephens	10,745	82.36%	+0.70
Democratic	Rich Horton	2,904	17.64%	−0.70
Total votes		13,047	100.00%	
