= Randall W. Williams =

Randall Williams

Director of the Missouri Department of Health and Senior Services
- In office March 9, 2017 – April 21, 2021
- Governor: Eric Greitens; Mike Parson

Personal details
- Party: Republican
- Education: University of North Carolina (BS, MD)

Randall W. Williams is an American obstetrician and gynecologist who was the director of the Missouri Department of Health and Senior Services from March 9, 2017, appointed by Governor Eric Greitens, through April 21, 2021, under Governor Mike Parson. Prior to that post, he had been appointed as Secretary of North Carolina Department of Health and Human Services, serving under Governor Pat McCrory.

== Early life and education ==
Williams is the son of textile industrialist William Leaford Williams and Elon University Vice president emeritus, Dr. Jo Watts Williams. He graduated from the Walter M. Williams High School in Burlington, North Carolina, in 1975. He graduated from the University of North Carolina, majoring in History and Zoology, and the University of North Carolina School of Medicine.

== Career ==
Williams was a practicing OB/GYN for over 30 years, eventually limiting his practice to gynecology.

In 2011, Williams ran for the office of mayor of Raleigh, North Carolina. A registered Republican, he finished third in the non-partisan race with 9% of the vote. During his campaign, he had cited his humanitarian work in Afghanistan, Iraq, and Haiti, as contributing to his ability to do the job, also commenting that "Raleigh is the #1 place to live in the United States."

=== Health Director ===
==== North Carolina ====
Williams became embroiled in controversy over the safety of household well water near coal ash ponds. In testimony in May 2016, related to a lawsuit, state toxicologist Ken Rudo said state health and environmental officials including Williams and former Department of Environmental Quality (DEQ) Assistant Secretary Tom Reeder, attempted to “play down the risk” of coal ash contamination of their wells. The officials had rescinded a "do-not-drink" notice sent to some well owners in March 2016. Rudo said in his deposition in the case that the state was informing residents that their household water was safe to drink when it knew it wasn't. Williams contended that he had rescinded those warning notices because he felt they were unnecessarily stirring up alarms. North Carolina's Department of Health and Human Services disagreed with Rudo's contentions. Megan Davies, a state Division of Public Health epidemiologist who was section chief and Rudo's supervisor, resigned because of the manner in which the department and McCrory's administration disputed Rudo's testimony. Davies and a co-worker testified regarding concerns they held about the state inappropriately rescinding the warning notices. McCrory was defeated for election in 2016, losing by .22%, 10,281 votes. On December 30, a day before he was leaving office, McCrory appointed Williams, one of his closest advisors, to the State Oil and Gas Council, a regulatory body that had been inactive since the governor won a legal battle with the legislature over appointments a year earlier.

==== Missouri ====
During the appointment confirmation of Williams, referencing the North Carolina coal ash water contamination issues, Senate Minority Leader Gina Walsh stated," After Flint, Michigan, I just want to make sure things like that don’t happen in my state," referring to Flint's problems with lead in its water supply. "Is it not your job to enforce your own rules?," she asked. Judges have sided with plaintiffs who were denied public health information by Williams about Missouri's disease incidence and prevalence, its medical marijuana program suppliers, and testing of a substance feared to be harmful to which police officers responding to demonstrations propelled by the Shooting of Anthony Lamar Smith were exposed. The fluid turned out to be apple cider vinegar.

In 2019, Williams was said to have deliberately instituted traumatizing impediments to women seeking to terminate pregnancies, including requiring that clinics do pelvic exams of dubious necessity, days before conducting abortions. On June 28, 2019, Planned Parenthood of St. Louis was granted a stay in the non-renewal of its license to perform abortions by the Missouri Administrative Hearing Commission until the AHC holds another hearing on the matter in August. Planned Parenthood had sued the Missouri Department of Health and Senior Services, its director, Williams and Governor Mike Parson in May 2019, seeking injunctive relief with its license set to expire. It claimed Missouri had illegally refused to renew the St. Louis clinic’s abortion license until officials completed an investigation into an unspecified patient complaint. On May 24, Parson signed a bill which banned abortions after the seventh week of pregnancy, which contained no exceptions for pregnancies which involved rape or incest. Besides the eight-week limitation, it also imposed a prison term of up to 15 years for doctors who violate the ban. The bill, set to become law on August 28, 2019, additionally included an outright ban on abortions, though contingent only if Roe v. Wade should be overturned. Missouri's abortion restrictions mandate a 72-hour waiting period after a scheduled abortion may be performed, in addition to imposing the impending eight-week ban. In sworn testimony, Williams admitted that he was using state funds to track the menstrual cycles of women who had accessed the services of the remaining clinic he was determined to close. Doctor Jennifer Villavicencio, a fellow with the American College of Obstetricians and Gynecologists, described the practice of state surveillance of clinic patients as, "defies both logic and ethics," calling the intrusion, "skin-crawling," continuing, "From an ethical standpoint, it’s frankly bonkers." New York University Bioethicist Arthur Caplan remarked, comparing Missouri's government to China, "When a government official monitors your reproductive behavior, you are perilously close to replicating totalitarian regimes."

Williams criticized House Budget Committee members, including Representative Robert Ross, Jered Taylor, and Scott Fitzpatrick, when Governor Mike Parson vetoed $153,000 that supported staff critical to the state program to expedite treatment to heart attack and stroke victims. Williams indicated the veto was intended to coerce hospitals to pay a $1,000 annual fee. Providers, such as Washington University in St. Louis, Abbott Emergency Services (EMS), and the American Heart Association, objected to the termination of the "Time Critical Diagnosis System". Williams received substantial criticism for the slow rollout of the COVID-19 vaccine program, where Missouri had the lowest rate of vaccinations in the United States. While rural areas had surplus supplies of vaccine, more densely populated urban and suburban areas suffered shortages. His office failed to disclose the results of almost 100,000 positive coronavirus tests. At the end of his tenure, only one-third of Missouri residents had received vaccines, while the nationwide average was 50% higher. Rather than instituting a statewide mask mandate, he left the regulations entirely up to local officials. His management of marijuana licenses also provoked controversy, with allegations of conflicts of interest in the awarding of licenses for the program. His frequent failures to provide legislators with requested information, and his unwillingness to obey the state's open records law resulted in a $138,000 fine being levied in just one case in 2021.

== Personal life ==
Randall and his wife Elizabeth had three children, sons Watt, a businessman, Steele, a photographer who died in 2012, and daughter Timmons, an exercise physiologist. In 2010, at 52 years old, he finished 9,286th, in a time of 3:37:28 at the Boston Marathon.

== External sources ==
Williams deposition May 18, 2016, re: Hexavalent chromium and Vanadium in drinking water
