= Rick Francis =

American politician

Member of the Missouri House of Representatives from the 145th district
- In office 2017–2025
- Preceded by: Shelley Keeney
- Succeeded by: Bryant Wolfin

Personal details
- Born: 1958 or 1959 (age 66–67) Cape Girardeau, Missouri, U.S.
- Party: Republican
- Spouse: Chrissy
- Children: four
- Profession: farmer, educator

Rick Francis (born 1958 or 1959) is an American politician. He was a member of the Missouri House of Representatives representing the 145th District, from 2017 to 2025. He is a member of the Republican party.
