= Shelley Keeney =

American politician (born 1979)

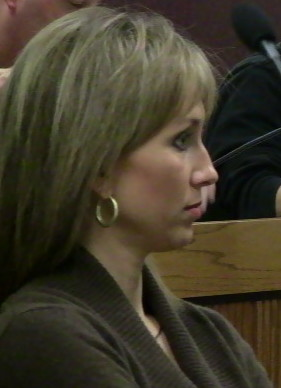

Member of the Missouri House of Representatives from the 145th district
- In office January 7, 2009 – 2017
- Preceded by: Rod Jetton
- Succeeded by: Rick Francis

Personal details
- Born: June 24, 1979 (age 47) Cape Girardeau, Missouri
- Party: Republican
- Profession: Teacher, Politician

Shelley Keeney (née White) (born June 24, 1979) is a former state representative from the U.S. state of Missouri having served in the Missouri House of Representatives from 2009 to 2017. She represented Missouri's 145th Legislative District, which consists of all of Bollinger County, Madison County, and the southern portion of Perry County, Missouri. She is a member of the Republican Party.

== Electoral history ==
2008 Race for Missouri’s 156th District House of Representatives
Party	Candidate	Votes	%	±%
Republican	Shelley Keeney	8,261	54.18	
Democratic	Michael Winder	6,987	45.82	
