= Randall Williams (showman) =

Victorian showman (1846–1898)

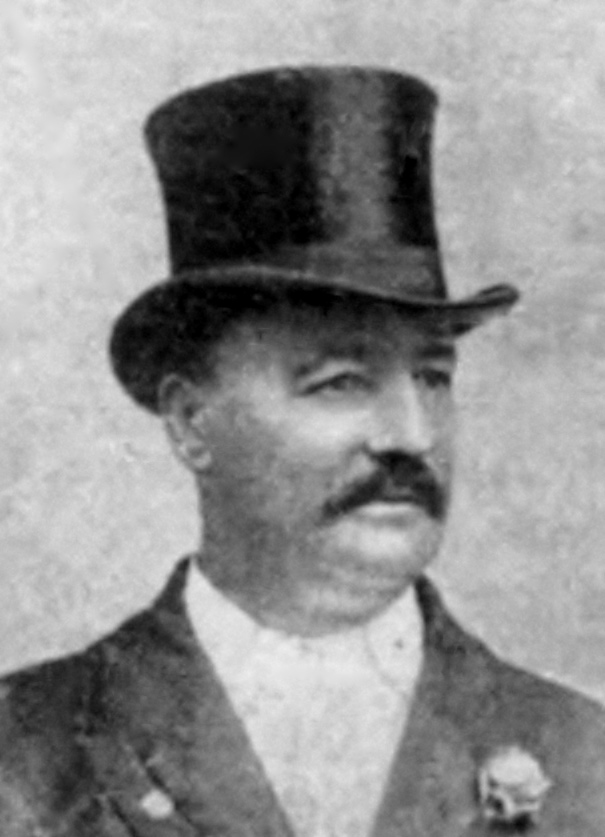
Randall K. Williams, c.1892.

Randall Kay Williams (17 July 1846 – 14 November 1898) was a Victorian showman noted for popularising moving pictures on British fairgrounds. The first known reference to a cinematograph exhibition in Williams' show was at Rotherham Statute Fair on 2 November 1896.

Williams toured Britain for 25 years, first with a ghost illusion show, and then with a bioscope. He reached the height of his career in the summer of 1897 when he exhibited at the Victorian Era Exhibition in Earl's Court, London with a show designed specifically to pay tribute to Queen Victoria's Diamond Jubilee.

Williams was also an outspoken advocate for the travelling show community and a founding member of the United Kingdom Van Dwellers’ Protection Association, the fairground trade organization which evolved into what is known today as the Showmen's Guild of Great Britain.

== Early life ==
Williams was born in Liverpool on 17 July 1846 and spent his entire life "on the road." His father, Thomas, came from an extended family of showmen with roots in Warrington. The Williams family began travelling with fairground shows in the mid 1840s and got their start in the business by making automaton figures and touring with waxworks and mechanical exhibitions. The mechanical exhibitions presented on Victorian fairgrounds consisted of a number of visual displays incorporating three-dimensional models with various moving parts. Each individual display was presented against an aptly painted scenic background. A typical exhibit portrayed some scene or event such as a colliery village or a battlefield re-enactment. Williams's father's show in 1870, for example, represented the loss of Her Majesty's ship "Captain" and depicted a storm and rescue at sea. The exhibition also included a model of a coal pit and had over one hundred mechanical figures.

The Williams family toured with shows until the early 1900s when they diversified into rides and other fairground attractions. Their various exhibits included waxworks and mechanical displays, photography and fine art exhibits, ghost shows, and cinematograph exhibitions.

== Ghost illusion show ==
Williams' primary interest was the ghost illusion show he started in 1871. A ghost illusion show was a type of stage show that combined theatrical presentations with the optical technique known as Pepper's Ghost. Ghost illusions were popular in British theatres throughout the 1860s but did not appear in fairground shows until the early 1870s.

The travelling show’s adaptation of Pepper’s Ghost was typically a short stage play, consisting of three acts and a comic song - all done in about twenty minutes. The final act usually ended with a ‘transformation scene' depicting the final passage from this life to the next, and during which, at least one ghostly entity made its appearance. The ‘ghost,’ a life-like, three dimensional and free moving apparition was the reflection of a living being (an actor) who was brightly lit up by limelight, and positioned off stage, out of sight of the audience’s view.

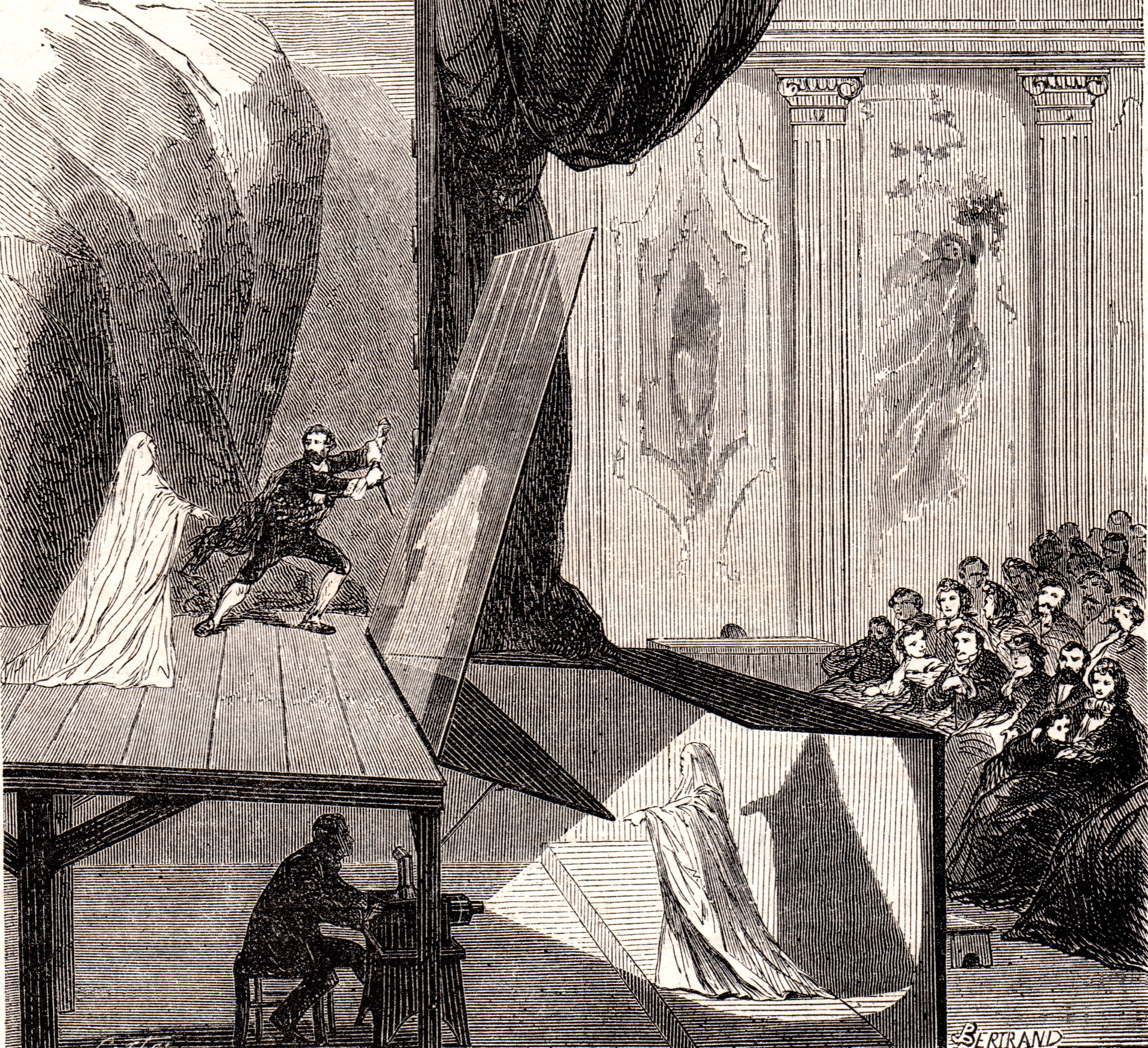
Pepper's Ghost stage set up

Putting on the ‘ghost’ was a rather costly undertaking for travelling show proprietors. The essential requirements were a source of lighting (limelight), a large mirror, and a large sheet of plate glass upon which to reflect the images. The glass had to be erected so that it sat at a 45-degree angle at the front of the stage and, it had to be housed in a box specially built for transport. The final component was a platform-type stage built high enough to accommodate the actors (the ghosts) who worked directly below and to the front of the stage, as well as the limelight worker, whose job it was to illuminate the actors whose images were reflected onto and through the glass. An enclosure or partition was erected around the front of the stage to prevent the audience from seeing all the activity that was going on below the surface.

The programs for Williams' show varied, but audiences were usually treated to at least one melodrama and a comical farce or two. His show at the New Year’s fair in Bolton, Lancashire in 1873 advertised a program of “a specially written adaptation of the late Chas. Dickens’s Christmas story of the Haunted Man;” “Gounod’s famous Opera of Faust and Marguerite;” “the tableaux illustrative of the heart-stirring poem of Little Jim, the Collier’s Child;” “the thrilling legend of Adrian, the Avenger;” “The Goblin’s Haunt, introducing the Gorgeous Transformation Scene;” “the Seraph or Living Head;” and other “Entertainment of Prestidigitation.”

Williams' show was part ghost illusion theatre, part variety show. The artists he employed included actors, song and dance teams, ballet dancers, mummers and comedians like the Great Little Titch and magicians like Leotard 'Boz' Bosco (James Frederick Greethead.) He also hired international acts such as The Brothers LaFayette (American tight rope walkers) and Professor Howard (an American illusionist). By the early 1880s, Williams' show had many of the same trappings as a theatrical touring company. The show’s crew in Manchester at the time of the 1881 census consisted of a number of actors, actresses, comedians, musicians and comic singers, as well as a set decorator and a dramatic author.

Williams' phantasmagoria was popular with fair-going audiences. A reporter who attended the show at Glasgow Fair in July 1880 wrote that, "Not the least amusing show on the ground is Randall Williams' "Hobgoblinscope," in which ghosts, phantoms, and goblins appear and disappear, and sing and dance in such a way as to puzzle the auditors to distinguish between illusion, and bodily impersonation."

=== The Victorian Era Exhibition 1897 ===
Williams reached the pinnacle of his success in 1897 when he was invited by showman-entrepreneur, Imre Kiralfy, to exhibit at the Victorian Era Exhibition in London. His show that year was designed specifically to pay homage to Queen Victoria’s sixty year reign and it included a number of short plays, films of the Queen’s Jubilee Procession (filmed 22 June 1897) and a tableau vivant representation of the Queen surrounded by flags of all nations. The exhibition guide billed the show as ‘Pepper’s Ghost,’ stating that “Mr. Randall Williams, who has made many improvements on the original, will present, amongst other features, distinct and apart from the Ghost Show, a representation of Her Majesty’s Coronation, and the chief scenes from the present Jubilee Year, all the characters being dressed in costumes of the period.”

=== Ghost show presentations ===
- The Haunted Man: Bolton New Year's Fair 1873
- Adrien the Avenger: Bolton New Year's Fair 1873
- Goblin's Haunt: Bolton New Year's Fair 1873
- Faust, or The Devil and The Doctor (in 3 acts) or Faust and Marguerite: Bolton New Year's Fair 1873; York Martinmas Fair 1880; Sowerby Rushbearing Festival 1886; Bingley Hall, Birmingham, 1886-87
- The Aerial Phenomenon: Pembroke Hall, Liverpool, Christmas 1874
- Chawbacon's Troubles: Pembroke Hall, Liverpool, Christmas 1874
- The Misanthrope: Pembroke Hall, Liverpool, Christmas 1874
- Death of Little Jim or Little Jim, The Collier`s Dying Child (based on the poem by Edward Farmer): Pembroke Hall, Liverpool 1874; Sowerby Rushbearing Festival 1886
- Crackskull Abbey (a spoof on the antics of real-life fraudster, Arthur Orton, who masqueraded as the missing heir, Sir Roger Tichborne): Hull Fair 1874
- Pagoda of Zegerzeneth: Nottingham Goose Fair 1875
- Little Jen, the light of the collier's homestead: Halifax Fair 1877
- Pilots Grave: Peterhead, Scotland 1881
- Paddy Mile's Boy, or Ghost at the Wake: Peterhead 1881
- The Dying Fisherman’s Child: Peterhead 1881
- The Twin Brothers, or the Duel to Death: Aberdeen, 1881
- Corsican Brothers: Bolton, 1883
- Maria Martin; or the Murder in the Red Barn: Bolton, 1883
- Demon of the Alps: Bolton, 1883
- Ten Nights in a Bar Room: Bolton, 1883
- Life and Adventures of Charles Peace: Barrow-in-Furness: 1884
- Mistletoe Bough: Chesterfield, 1884
- Fall of Khartoum (a melodrama depicting the death of General Charles Gordon at the Battle of Khartoum in late January 1885): Aston Fair 1885
- “Gorgeous Illuminated View of St. Peter’s Church, Rome. With the Celebration of High Pontifical Mass”: Birmingham 1888
- Otto Brand, or the Murder of the Hull Fisher Boy: Hildethorpe, 1889
- Maniac Lover, or the Bonnie Lass of Bridlington: Hildethorpe, 1889
- The Bells, "as played by Henry Irving" (The Bells was a three-act play by Leopold Davis Lewis. Henry Irving was the British actor most commonly associated with the lead role): Boston May Fair 1895
- The Colleen Bawn (based on a melodrama by Irish play-write Dion Boucicault): Boston May Fair 1895
- Faith, Hope, and Charity: Boston May Fair 1895
- Uncle Tom’s Cabin (accompanied by James Tipton's “Eva, A musically illustrated service compiled and arranged from Uncle Tom's Cabin"): 1896
- Adrian the Betrayer: Victorian Era Exhibition, Earl's Court, London 1897

Ghost illusions were the mainstay of Williams' show for a quarter of a century with the 'ghosts' making their final appearance at Nottingham Goose Fair in October 1897. The show travelled under various names over the years including The Great Hobgoblinscope (1872 - 1885); The Great Ghost Show (1881 - 1895); and Randall Williams Grand Electroscope and Mammoth Phantoscopical Exhibition (1896-1897).

== Cinematograph show ==
Travelling showmen played an important role in introducing the new medium of moving pictures to the British public in the late 1890s. In fact, the speed at which the cinema took off in Britain was due, in large part, to the combined network of exhibitors (travelling showmen) and performance venues (the fairs and fairgrounds) that was already in place.

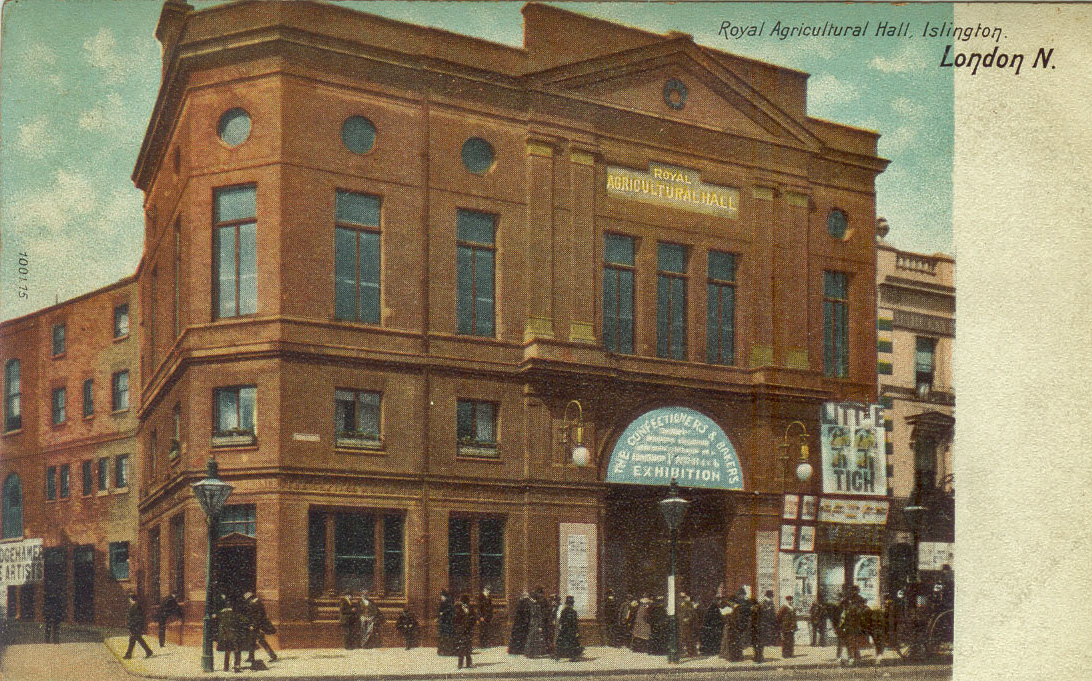
Royal Agricultural Hall, Islington, London

Williams was one of the first showmen to exhibit films on the fairgrounds. The first known reference to a cinematograph exhibition in his show was at Rotherham Statute Fair on 2 November 1896. It is likely, however, that he exhibited films two weeks earlier. Williams referred to his first cinematograph as the "Electroscope" and, at Hull Fair in October that year, he had been advertising “The Electroscope and Living Pictures.” The following month, he became the first showman to exhibit films at the World’s Fair, an indoor fair held each year over the Christmas holiday period at the Royal Agricultural Hall in London. Williams's next stop was the Valentine's Fair at King's Lynn, Norfolk in February 1897, where it was reported that "Randall Williams’ Cinematographe Pavilion did immense business."

=== Haydon and Urry, Ltd. ===
There is no record of the supplier of Williams's first cinematograph, but by early February 1897, he was using one supplied by Haydon and Urry, a London-based firm that produced cinematographs and films during the late 1890s. The company's involvement in the cinema trade was short-lived, but they are noted for supplying many of the first fairground exhibitors.

Williams was the first showman to use Haydon and Urry's cinematograph (The Eragraph) and his use of their machine came about as a result of three contributing factors: - need, availability, and timing. In late 1896, Haydon and Urry were in the process of developing their own cinematograph. They had just moved their premises to 353 Upper Street, Islington, locating them directly across the street from the Royal Agricultural Hall where Williams was exhibiting. In early February 1897, their new cinematograph was ready for market - just as Williams had become in need of a new one. He had opened at the World’s Fair with a film exhibition, but the projector he was using (the Electroscope) had been condemned as a fire risk by London County officials. Outfitting Williams was a major coup for Haydon and Urry and they applied for a patent for their cinematograph on 10 February 1897, just as the World’s Fair was coming to an end and, just prior to Williams opening at King’s Lynn at the start of the fairground season. The projector used by Williams at Lynn would have been the firm’s earliest model and the same model he used throughout the summer at the Victorian Era Exhibition in Earl's Court, London. Williams initially billed his cinematograph as The Electroscope, but after he upgraded to Haydon and Urry’s improved model in October, he began advertising it as The Biograph.

Williams was Haydon and Urry’s best known exhibitor, but their Eragraph projector was popular with other early film show proprietors including Harry Scard (of Wadbrook and Scard fame); Albert and George Biddall; Alfred Reynold (Reynold’s Waxworks Exhibition, Liverpool); John Cooper; George Aspland; Charles Thurston; George Lewis; James Crighton; James Norman; George Williams; Walter Lear (Lears’ Pierrot Minstrels); M. de Montel; Signor Ernest Polverini; Hamilton Brothers (diorama exhibition); John Sylvester (Sylvester’s Circus); and Mr. C. A. James (World’s Fair Wax-works, Dublin).

==== Queen Victoria's diamond jubilee procession ====
Williams' main draw in 1897 were films supplied by Haydon and Urry of Queen Victoria's Jubilee Procession on 22 June 1897. The company opened its own film production studio in April 1897 and the Jubilee films (a series of six films) were produced by James and Richard Monte, two brothers employed by the firm. The films were exhibited at the London Pavilion the same night they were filmed and are believed to have been the first footage of the Queen's procession to be seen by the public. A second copy of the films was dispatched by train to Liverpool where they were exhibited by the owners of Reynolds Waxworks and Variety Exhibition on Lime Street within 24 hours of the procession having taken place.

Other films produced for Haydon & Urry by the Monte brothers included scenes of Henley Regatta, Lady Overboard, Turn out of Fire Brigade, The Bride's First Night, Twelve Months After, and the funeral procession of actor William Terriss.

=== Films exhibited in Williams' Show ===
- Queen of the Antipodes: World’s Fair, Royal Agricultural Hall, London, December 1896
- Fishery Exhibition: World’s Fair, London, December 1896
- The Czar in Paris: King’s Lynn, February 1897
- Serpentine Dance: King's Lynn, February 1897
- A Paris boulevard: King’s Lynn, February 1897
- A march past of the Royal blues: King’s Lynn, February 1897
- Queen Victoria’s Diamond Jubilee Procession: Victorian Era Exhibition, London, June 1897: Nottingham Goose Fair 1897
- Graeco-Turkish War film (a fake war film): Nottingham Goose Fair 1897
- Mdme Loie Fuller in a most beautiful Serpentine dance: Hull Fair 1897
- Village Blacksmith: Hull Fair 1897
- The teetotaller that got drunk - roars of laughter: Hull Fair 1897
- The old gardener - very humorous: Hull Fair 1897
- Express training coming into a local station, people getting in and out of the train: Hull Fair 1897
- Prize fight between Fitzsimmons & Corbett (likely Haydon & Urry’s The Great Fight – Knockout): Hull Fair 1897
- A young lady taking a morning bath (likely Haydon & Urry's Impromptu Bath): Hull Fair 1897
- Wrestling Match for Championship of the World: Hull Fair 1897
- On the benches in the park: Hull Fair, October 1897
- The unfaithful wife: Hull Fair, October 1897
- The Bride's First Night (filmed by Haydon & Urry): Hull Fair, October 1897
- Bathing at Blackpool: Hull Fair, October 1897
- Sea at Storm: Hull Fair, October 1897
- The Queen’s carriage near St. Paul’s, Prince of Wales, Duke of Cambridge, Foreign Princes, Colonial Premiers, &c.: Hull Fair, 1897
- Local Animated Subjects: Malton Hiring Fair, November 1897
- Funeral of William Terriss (filmed by Haydon & Urry): World’s Fair, London, January 1898
- Snowballing Match: World’s Fair, London, January 1898
- A film depicting the 1898 Spanish–American War: Manningham Feast, Yorkshire, August 1898
- Gladstone’s Funeral: London, June 1898
- Dr. Grace’s Jubilee Day at Lords: Nottingham Goose Fair 1898

== The Van Dweller's Protection Association ==
Williams was one of the travelling show community’s more outspoken advocates. He organized several protests over the years against the railway companies over the rates they were charging travelling amusement caterers. He was also one of a small group of showmen who met at the Black Lion Hotel in Salford in late 1890 to organize a protest against the Moveable Dwellings Bill. The proposed bill had been initiated by child welfare reformer, George Smith, and was described as “providing for the regulation of vans, vehicles and tents used as dwellings.” It’s real intent, however, was to enact legislation aimed at regulating and controlling the gypsy population and forcing itinerant parents to send their children to school. There were some commendable aspects to the bill, but the showmen believed that if the bill passed, it would restrict their ability to travel and pose a serious threat to their livelihoods.

The showmen’s dispute with George Smith over the bill lasted another three years. Smith’s final attempt to regulate the itinerant population was a revised bill in 1894 for the “improvement of moveable dwellings,” but little became of it and Smith died less than a year later. The showmen’s opposition to the bill, however, left a lasting legacy. It helped shape a new alliance between the men and women who made a living with traveling amusements and led to them forming the United Kingdom Van Dwellers’ Protection Association at a meeting in Lord George Sanger's Amphitheatre in London on 12 February 1891. The new van dwellers association was the start of a new trade organization and it helped define those in the travelling amusement trade as a distinct group, socially and economically separate from other groups of travellers.

The Van Dweller’s Protection Association was renamed the Showmen’s Guild in 1900 and is known today as the Showmen's Guild of Great Britain. Williams was deeply involved in the Van Dweller’s Protection Association, both as a committee member and as one of the Vice Presidents for the Manchester Section.

== Death and legacy ==
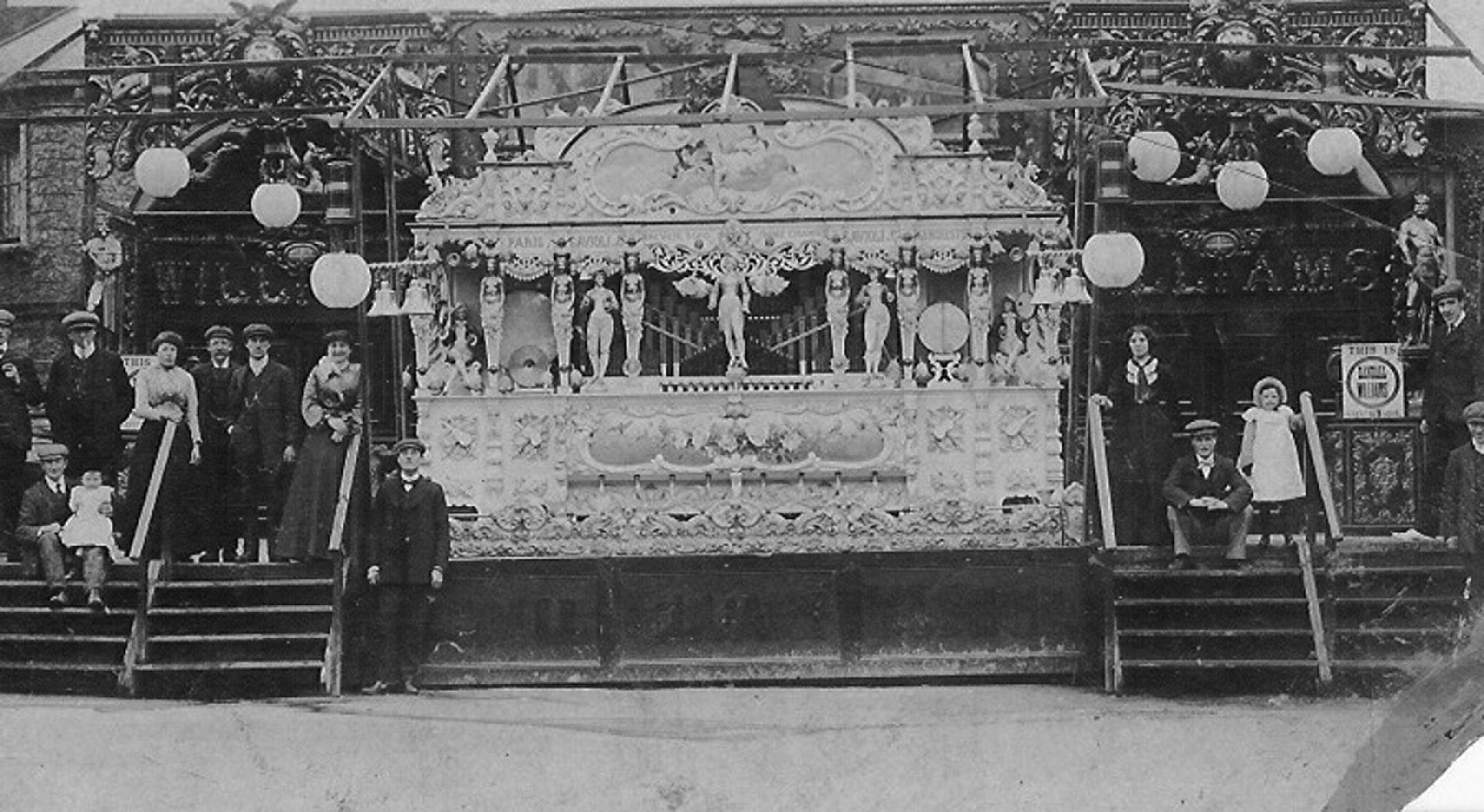
Randall Williams Cinematograph Show, 1902

Williams' last show was at Freeman Street Market in Great Grimsby, Lincolnshire, where he died of typhoid fever on 14 November 1898. He was buried at Weaste Cemetery in Salford on 18 November with the funeral service being conducted by the Reverend Thomas Horne. Williams was survived by his long-term partner, Annie Radford Williams, daughters, Caroline and Annie, and sons, Randall, Thomas, Eddie Albert, and George. He was predeceased by his first wife, Mary Ann Hough, who died in 1884.

Following his death, Williams' main bioscope was taken over by his daughter Carrie and new husband, Dick Monte (former Haydon and Urry employee). They continued to travel the show as the Randall Williams Cinematograph Show until 1913 when it was destroyed by fire at Thirsk, Yorkshire. Williams' No. 2 show was taken over by his daughter and son-in-law, Annie and Reuben Williams. They travelled with their bioscope until 1906.
