= Missouri Department of Health and Senior Services =

Randall Williams

Agency overview
- Jurisdiction: Missouri
- Agency executive: Paula F. Nickelson, Director
- Website: https://health.mo.gov/

The Department of Health and Senior Services is responsible for managing and promoting all public health programs to improve life and wellness for Missourians. They are responsible for maintaining programs to control and prevent disease; regulation and licensure of health and child care facilities; and programs designed to create safeguards and health resources for seniors and the state's vulnerable populations.

The department and its four divisions, Community & Public Health, Administration, Regulation & Licensure, Senior & Disability Services; is maintained by a director who is appointed by the State Governor and approved by the Senate.

== History ==
In 1883, Missouri legislature created the State Board of Health after citizens campaigned for a state agency that would be responsible for promoting Missourian's health and preventing disease. This was a successful endeavor as the population and life expectancy of the average citizen of Missouri rose. When the state government reorganized in 1945, the State Board of Health was replaced with the Division of Health under the Department of Public Health and Welfare. The State Board of Health was again created in 1967 but under the Division of Health.

When the state government reorganized again in 1974, the Division of Health was transferred to the Department of Social Services. At the same time, the divisions programs on environmental engineering and solid waste programs were transferred to the Department of Natural Resources and the Missouri Crippled Children's Service became a part of the Division of Health.

In 1985, the Department of Health was created to oversee all public health programs. 15 years later, the Division of Aging was transferred under the Department of Health and renamed The Department of Health and Senior Services in 2001.
