= Missouri's 30th Senate district =

American legislative district

Missouri's 30th State Senate district
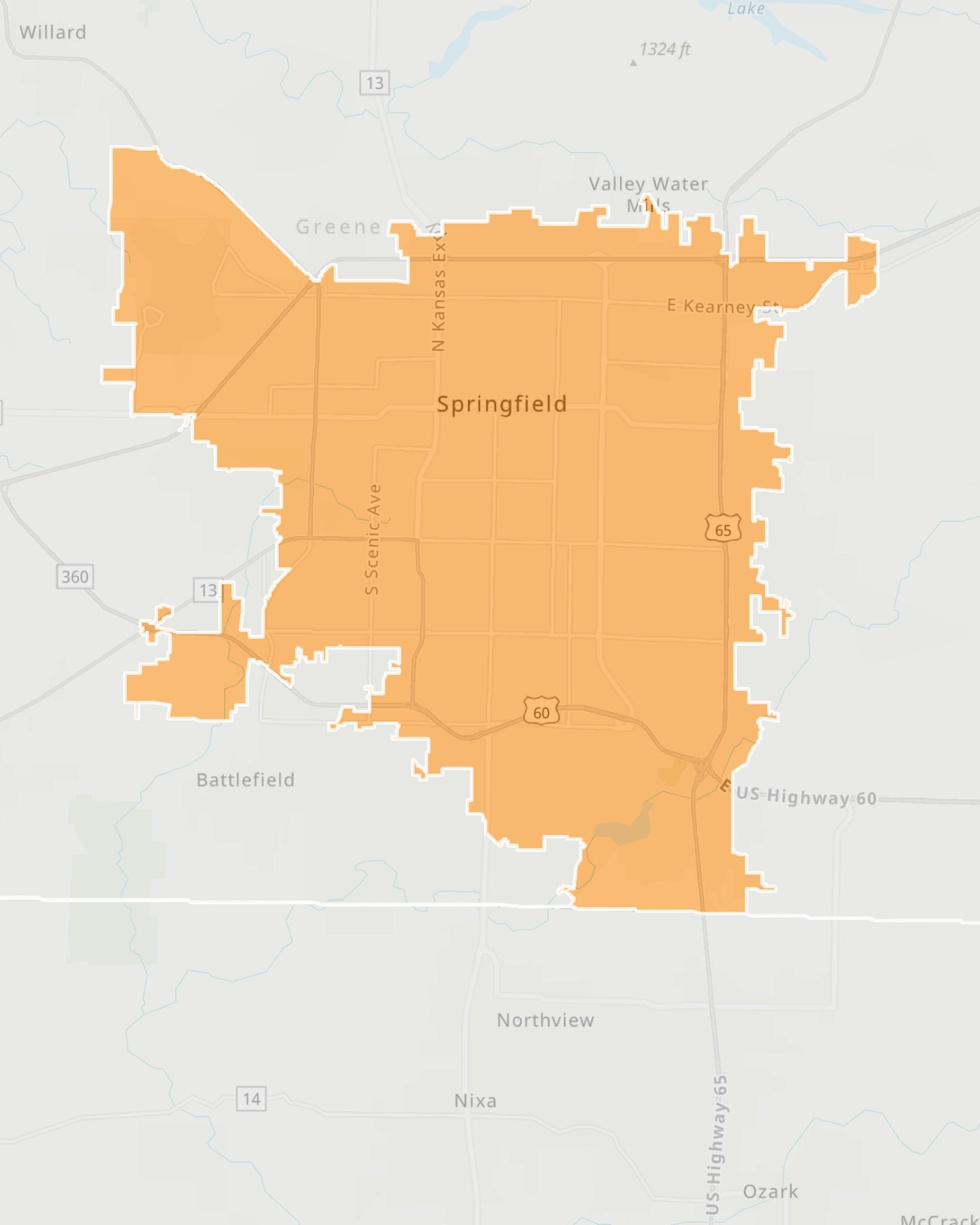
Senator
Lincoln Hough; R–Springfield
- Demographics: 83% White; 4% Black; 6% Hispanic; 2% Asian; 5% Other
- Population (2023): 180,269

Missouri's 30th Senatorial District is one of 34 districts in the Missouri Senate. The district has been represented by Republican Lincoln Hough since 2019.

== Geography ==
The district is based in southwestern Missouri and consists of Springfield city limits, with alterations made for compactness and contiguity. The district is home to Missouri State University, Springfield Botanical Gardens, and the Wonders of Wildlife National Museum.

== 2026 candidates ==
=== Republican primary ===
- Melanie Stinnett, state representative of District 133

=== Democratic primary ===
- Betsy Fogle, state representative of District 135

=== Libertarian primary ===
- Cecil Ince, Libertarian activist and perennial candidate

== Election results (1998–2022) ==
=== 1998 ===
Missouri's 30th Senatorial District election (1998)
Party	Candidate	Votes	%
Republican	Roseann Bentley	30,465	67.0
Democratic	Kaye Parker	13,903	30.6
Libertarian	Phillip W. Horras	1,070	2.4
Total votes		45,438	100.0

=== 2002 ===
Missouri's 30th Senatorial District election (2002)
Party	Candidate	Votes	%
Republican	Norma Champion	25,915	51.5
Democratic	Craig Hosmer	24,419	48.5
Total votes		50,334	100.0
Republican hold			

=== 2006 ===
Missouri's 30th Senatorial District election (2006)
Party	Candidate	Votes	%
Republican	Norma Champion (incumbent)	36,370	57.5
Democratic	Doug Harpool	26,934	42.5
Total votes		63,304	100.0
Republican hold			

=== 2010 ===
Missouri's 30th Senatorial District election (2010)
Party	Candidate	Votes	%
Republican	Bob Dixon	33,715	64.9
Democratic	Michael Hoeman	18,272	35.1
Total votes		51,987	100.0
Republican hold			

=== 2014 ===
Missouri's 30th Senatorial District election (2014)
Party	Candidate	Votes	%
Republican	Bob Dixon (incumbent)	27,207	100.0
Total votes		27,207	100.0
Republican hold			

=== 2018 ===
Missouri's 30th Senatorial District election (2018)
Party	Candidate	Votes	%
Republican	Lincoln Hough	34,987	53.3
Democratic	Charlie Norr	30,690	46.7
Total votes		65,677	100.0
Republican hold			

=== 2022 ===
Missouri's 30th Senatorial District election (2022)
Party	Candidate	Votes	%
Republican	Lincoln Hough (incumbent)	30,483	57.6
Democratic	Raymond Lampert	22,464	42.4
Total votes		52,947	100.0
Republican hold			

== Statewide election results ==
Year	Office	Results
2008	President	McCain 51.8 – 46.5%
2012	President	Romney 56.3 – 43.7%
2016	President	Trump 53.3 – 39.6%
2016	Senate	Blunt 49.6 – 45.3%
2016	Governor	Greitens 50.8 – 44.8%
2018	Senate	McCaskill 48.4 – 47.4%
2020	President	Trump 49.7 – 47.7%
2020	Governor	Parson 50.4 – 46.7%
