= 2024 Missouri lieutenant gubernatorial election =

- November 5, 2024
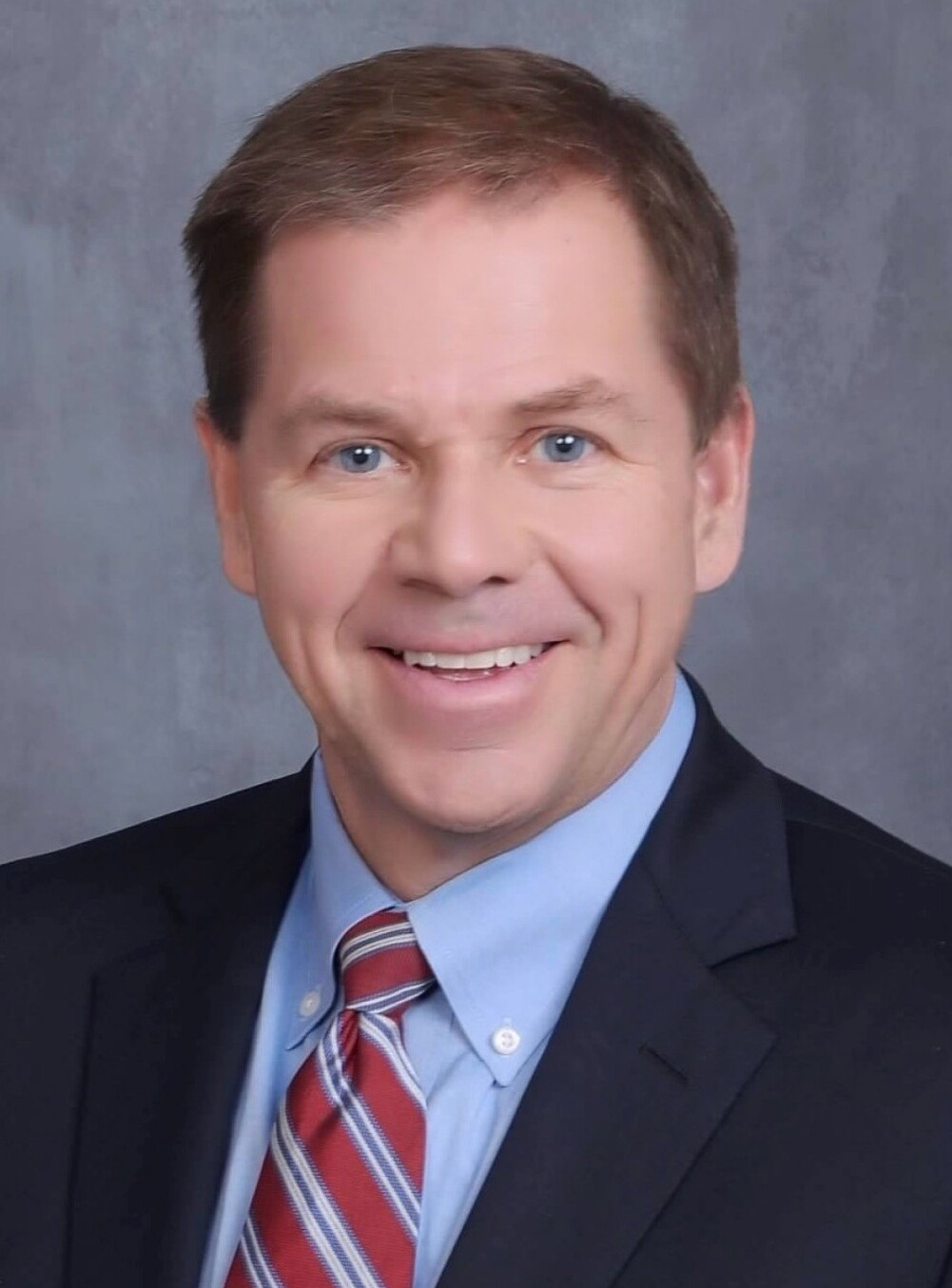

Nominee	David Wasinger	Richard Brown
Party	Republican	Democratic
Popular vote	1,671,771	1,121,608
Percentage	57.38%	38.50%
- Wasinger: 40–50% 50–60% 60–70% 70–80% 80–90% >90% Brown: 40–50% 50–60% 60–70% 70–80% 80–90% >90% Tie: 40–50% 50% No votes
Lieutenant Governor before election
Mike Kehoe
Republican
Elected Lieutenant Governor
David Wasinger
Republican

The 2024 Missouri lieutenant gubernatorial election was held on November 5, 2024, to elect the lieutenant governor of Missouri, concurrently with the 2024 U.S. presidential election, as well as elections to the United States Senate, elections to the United States House of Representatives, and various other state and local elections. Incumbent Republican Lieutenant Governor Mike Kehoe did not run for reelection for a second full term, and instead ran successfully for Governor of Missouri. The filing deadline was March 26, 2024, with primaries being held on August 6. Republican attorney David Wasinger and Democratic state Representative Richard Brown won their parties' respective primaries, and faced each other in the general election. Wasinger defeated Brown by nearly 19 percentage points.

== Republican primary ==
=== Candidates ===
==== Nominee ====
- David Wasinger, attorney and candidate for state auditor in 2018

==== Eliminated in primary ====
- Tim Baker, Franklin County Clerk
- Paul Berry III, bail bondsman and perennial candidate
- Lincoln Hough, state senator from the 30th district
- Holly Thompson Rehder, state senator from the 27th district

==== Withdrawn ====
- Bob Onder, former state senator from the 2nd district (ran for U.S. House)
- Dean Plocher, Speaker of the Missouri House of Representatives (ran for Secretary of State)
- Matthew Porter, businessman (remained on ballot)

==== Declined ====
- Mike Kehoe, incumbent lieutenant governor (ran for governor)

==== Endorsements ====
Lincoln Hough

U.S. senators

- Kit Bond, former U.S. Senator from Missouri (1987–2011) and former Governor of Missouri (1973–1977, 1981–1985)

Organizations

- Missouri Farm Bureau
David Wasinger

Organizations

- Missouri Right to Life PAC

=== Polling ===
Poll source	Date(s) administered	Sample size (Note: Key: A – all adults RV – registered voters LV – likely voters V – unclear)	Margin of error	Tim Baker	Paul Berry	Lincoln Hough	Bob Onder	Dean Plocher	Matthew Porter	Holly Thompson Rehder	David Wasinger	Undecided
Battleground Connect (R) (Note: Poll commissioned by the Missouri Scout)	July 30–31, 2024	896 (LV)	± 3.1%	3%	3%	22%	–	–	3%	19%	18%	32%
Remington Research Group (R)	July 22–24, 2024	864 (LV)	± 3.3%	4%	2%	17%	–	–	3%	13%	18%	42%
Remington Research (R)	June 11–13, 2024	578 (LV)	± 4.0%	3%	2%	11%	–	–	1%	14%	5%	65%
Victory Enterprises (Note: Poll commissioned by Fighting for Missouri Families PAC, which supports Porter)	May 28–31, 2024	500 (LV)	± 4.38%	–	–	8%	–	–	5%	5%	4%	76%
Remington Research (R)	March 27–29, 2024	527 (LV)	± 4.0%	3%	3%	8%	–	–	2%	13%	4%	67%
Remington Research (R)	February 14–15, 2024	706 (LV)	± 3.6%	10%	6%	–	–	6%	–	20%	5%	53%
Remington Research (R)	September 27–28, 2023	714 (LV)	± 3.4%	11%	6%	–	–	5%	–	20%	–	58%
Remington Research (R)	July 5–7, 2023	706 (LV)	± 3.4%	–	–	–	–	14%	–	18%	–	68%
Remington Research (R)	April 11–12, 2023	778 (LV)	± 3.4%	–	–	–	13%	11%	–	16%	–	60%

=== Results ===
Republican primary results
Party	Candidate	Votes	%
Republican	David Wasinger	206,875	31.39
Republican	Lincoln Hough	199,423	30.26
Republican	Holly Thompson Rehder	142,801	21.67
Republican	Tim Baker	64,198	9.74
Republican	Matthew Porter (withdrawn)	28,263	4.28
Republican	Paul Berry III	17,540	2.66
Total votes		659,100	100

== Democratic primary ==
=== Candidates ===
==== Nominee ====
- Richard Brown, state representative from the 27th district

==== Eliminated in primary ====
- Anastasia Syes

==== Declined ====
- John Kiehne, digital media consultant and perennial candidate (ran for U.S. House)

=== Results ===
Democratic primary results
Party	Candidate	Votes	%
Democratic	Richard Brown	231,970	64.93
Democratic	Anastasia Syes	125,283	35.07
Total votes		357,253	100.00

== Third-party and independent candidates ==
=== Candidates ===
- Danielle Elliott (Green), certified medical coder
- Ken Iverson (Libertarian), retired software engineer

== General election ==
=== Predictions ===
Source	Ranking	As of
Sabato's Crystal Ball	Safe R	July 25, 2024

=== Polling ===
Poll source	Date(s) administered	Sample size	Margin of error	David Wasinger (R)	Richard Brown (D)	Other	Undecided
ActiVote	October 8–27, 2024	400 (LV)	± 4.9%	57%	43%	–	–
ActiVote	September 6 – October 13, 2024	400 (LV)	± 4.9%	60%	40%	–	–
YouGov/Saint Louis University	August 8–16, 2024	450 (LV)	± 5.4%	51%	37%	1%	11%

=== Results ===
2024 Missouri lieutenant gubernatorial election
Party	Candidate	Votes	%
Republican	David Wasinger	1,671,771	57.38
Democratic	Richard Brown	1,121,608	38.50
Libertarian	Ken Iverson	61,731	2.12
Green	Dani Elliott	58,260	2.00
Total votes		2,913,370	100.00
Republican hold			

==== By county ====
County	David Wasinger Republican		Richard Brown Democratic		Various candidates Other parties		Margin		Total
County	#	%	#	%	#	%	#	%	Total
Adair	6,526	65.49%	3,073	30.84%	366	3.67%	3,453	34.65%	9,965
Andrew	6,772	71.41%	2,216	23.37%	495	5.22%	4,556	48.04%	9,483
Atchison	1,959	76.67%	473	18.51%	123	4.81%	1,486	58.16%	2,555
Audrain	7,133	70.28%	2,427	23.91%	590	5.81%	4,706	46.36%	10,150
Barry	12,351	78.89%	2,648	16.91%	657	4.20%	9,703	61.98%	15,656
Barton	4,855	83.75%	730	12.59%	212	3.66%	4,125	71.16%	5,797
Bates	6,061	75.77%	1,565	19.56%	373	4.66%	4,496	56.21%	7,999
Benton	7,891	75.33%	2,116	20.20%	468	4.47%	5,775	55.13%	10,475
Bollinger	4,992	83.52%	740	12.38%	245	4.10%	4,252	71.14%	5,977
Boone	38,483	44.36%	44,671	51.49%	3,602	4.15%	-6,188	-7.13%	86,756
Buchanan	21,279	61.37%	11,840	34.15%	1,555	4.48%	9,439	27.22%	34,674
Butler	14,023	80.24%	2,960	16.94%	493	2.82%	11,063	63.30%	17,476
Caldwell	3,465	75.94%	857	18.78%	241	5.28%	2,608	57.16%	4,563
Callaway	14,074	67.75%	5,389	25.94%	1,311	6.31%	8,685	41.81%	20,774
Camden	18,490	74.98%	5,108	20.71%	1,062	4.31%	13,382	54.27%	24,660
Cape Girardeau	27,728	70.98%	9,444	24.18%	1,891	4.84%	18,284	46.81%	39,063
Carroll	3,340	76.92%	778	17.92%	224	5.16%	2,562	59.01%	4,342
Carter	2,338	84.28%	349	12.58%	87	3.14%	1,989	71.70%	2,774
Cass	36,671	63.64%	18,109	31.43%	2,842	4.93%	18,562	32.21%	57,622
Cedar	5,522	79.87%	1,041	15.06%	351	5.08%	4,481	64.81%	6,914
Chariton	2,816	72.33%	885	22.73%	192	4.93%	1,931	49.60%	3,893
Christian	37,024	74.81%	10,534	21.28%	1,934	3.91%	26,490	53.52%	49,492
Clark	2,445	76.48%	610	19.08%	142	4.44%	1,835	57.40%	3,197
Clay	65,386	51.41%	56,838	44.69%	4,954	3.90%	8,548	6.72%	127,178
Clinton	7,586	69.92%	2,672	24.63%	591	5.45%	4,914	45.29%	10,849
Cole	25,631	65.64%	11,558	29.60%	1,856	4.75%	14,073	36.04%	39,045
Cooper	6,150	71.09%	2,144	24.78%	357	4.13%	4,006	46.31%	8,651
Crawford	8,240	78.19%	1,995	18.93%	304	2.88%	6,245	59.26%	10,539
Dade	3,319	81.57%	576	14.16%	174	4.28%	2,743	67.41%	4,069
Dallas	6,423	78.80%	1,314	16.12%	414	5.08%	5,109	62.68%	8,151
Daviess	2,889	75.69%	741	19.41%	187	4.90%	2,148	56.27%	3,817
DeKalb	3,534	76.18%	845	18.22%	260	5.60%	2,689	57.97%	4,639
Dent	5,581	81.13%	1,030	14.97%	268	3.90%	4,551	66.16%	6,879
Douglas	5,747	82.17%	910	13.01%	337	4.82%	4,837	69.16%	6,994
Dunklin	7,365	76.25%	1,805	18.69%	489	5.06%	5,560	57.56%	9,659
Franklin	37,436	69.91%	13,801	25.77%	2,314	4.32%	23,635	44.14%	53,551
Gasconade	6,092	78.60%	1,462	18.86%	197	2.54%	4,630	59.73%	7,751
Gentry	2,426	76.85%	605	19.16%	126	3.99%	1,821	57.68%	3,157
Greene	84,657	59.86%	51,337	36.30%	5,439	3.85%	33,320	23.56%	141,433
Grundy	3,429	79.84%	733	17.07%	133	3.10%	2,696	62.77%	4,295
Harrison	3,123	83.41%	525	14.02%	96	2.56%	2,598	69.39%	3,744
Henry	7,471	71.09%	2,524	24.02%	514	4.89%	4,947	47.07%	10,509
Hickory	3,835	77.18%	899	18.09%	235	4.73%	2,936	59.09%	4,969
Holt	1,798	79.52%	369	16.32%	94	4.16%	1,429	63.20%	2,261
Howard	3,270	68.37%	1,276	26.68%	237	4.96%	1,994	41.69%	4,783
Howell	14,870	80.81%	2,905	15.79%	627	3.41%	11,965	65.02%	18,402
Iron	3,210	74.74%	840	19.56%	245	5.70%	2,370	55.18%	4,295
Jackson	118,355	38.18%	176,716	57.00%	14,943	4.82%	-58,361	-18.83%	310,014
Jasper	38,002	72.02%	12,748	24.16%	2,019	3.83%	25,254	47.86%	52,769
Jefferson	74,218	64.57%	34,923	30.38%	5,806	5.05%	39,295	34.19%	114,947
Johnson	15,504	67.24%	6,534	28.34%	1,021	4.43%	8,970	38.90%	23,059
Knox	1,316	78.61%	291	17.38%	67	4.00%	1,025	61.23%	1,674
Laclede	13,778	81.81%	2,489	14.78%	574	3.41%	11,289	67.03%	16,841
Lafayette	12,205	72.20%	4,151	24.56%	548	3.24%	8,054	47.65%	16,904
Lawrence	14,027	78.71%	3,047	17.10%	747	4.19%	10,980	61.61%	17,821
Lewis	3,338	77.18%	813	18.80%	174	4.02%	2,525	58.38%	4,325
Lincoln	23,145	74.62%	6,655	21.45%	1,219	3.93%	16,490	53.16%	31,019
Linn	3,975	72.40%	1,242	22.62%	273	4.97%	2,733	49.78%	5,490
Livingston	5,127	77.30%	1,313	19.79%	193	2.91%	3,814	57.50%	6,633
Macon	6,017	78.68%	1,416	18.52%	214	2.80%	4,601	60.17%	7,647
Madison	4,296	77.35%	985	17.73%	273	4.92%	3,311	59.61%	5,554
Maries	3,823	81.78%	737	15.76%	115	2.46%	3,086	66.01%	4,675
Marion	9,699	75.63%	2,680	20.90%	446	3.48%	7,019	54.73%	12,825
McDonald	7,503	82.08%	1,338	14.64%	300	3.28%	6,165	67.44%	9,141
Mercer	1,460	84.83%	222	12.90%	39	2.27%	1,238	71.93%	1,721
Miller	10,014	80.23%	1,918	15.37%	549	4.40%	8,096	64.87%	12,481
Mississippi	3,034	71.81%	972	23.01%	219	5.18%	2,062	48.80%	4,225
Moniteau	5,472	77.77%	1,205	17.13%	359	5.10%	4,267	60.65%	7,036
Monroe	3,230	76.87%	804	19.13%	168	4.00%	2,426	57.73%	4,202
Montgomery	4,541	77.86%	1,098	18.83%	193	3.31%	3,443	59.04%	5,832
Morgan	7,131	76.49%	1,760	18.88%	432	4.63%	5,371	57.61%	9,323
New Madrid	4,698	72.01%	1,536	23.54%	290	4.45%	3,162	48.47%	6,524
Newton	22,278	77.91%	5,446	19.05%	870	3.04%	16,832	58.87%	28,594
Nodaway	6,666	70.43%	2,492	26.33%	307	3.24%	4,174	44.10%	9,465
Oregon	3,502	79.25%	686	15.52%	231	5.23%	2,816	63.72%	4,419
Osage	6,417	85.07%	952	12.62%	174	2.31%	5,465	72.45%	7,543
Ozark	3,788	82.89%	619	13.54%	163	3.57%	3,169	69.34%	4,570
Pemiscot	3,625	72.17%	1,266	25.20%	132	2.63%	2,359	46.96%	5,023
Perry	7,341	79.30%	1,587	17.14%	329	3.55%	5,754	62.16%	9,257
Pettis	13,314	72.07%	4,433	24.00%	726	3.93%	8,881	48.08%	18,473
Phelps	13,079	69.26%	5,072	26.86%	734	3.89%	8,007	42.40%	18,885
Pike	5,842	76.86%	1,563	20.56%	196	2.58%	4,279	56.30%	7,601
Platte	29,252	51.47%	25,534	44.92%	2,052	3.61%	3,718	6.54%	56,838
Polk	12,407	79.70%	2,668	17.14%	493	3.17%	9,739	62.56%	15,568
Pulaski	10,610	70.60%	3,516	23.39%	903	6.01%	7,094	47.20%	15,029
Putnam	1,831	80.41%	352	15.46%	94	4.13%	1,479	64.95%	2,277
Ralls	4,392	78.00%	1,051	18.66%	188	3.34%	3,341	59.33%	5,631
Randolph	7,629	71.45%	2,461	23.05%	588	5.51%	5,168	48.40%	10,678
Ray	7,768	69.10%	2,836	25.23%	638	5.68%	4,932	43.87%	11,242
Reynolds	2,190	76.95%	507	17.81%	149	5.24%	1,683	59.14%	2,846
Ripley	4,434	80.08%	761	13.74%	342	6.18%	3,673	66.34%	5,537
Saline	6,066	66.72%	2,616	28.77%	410	4.51%	3,450	37.95%	9,092
Schuyler	1,416	76.62%	339	18.34%	93	5.03%	1,077	58.28%	1,848
Scotland	1,435	79.19%	310	17.11%	67	3.70%	1,125	62.09%	1,812
Scott	12,969	76.67%	3,358	19.85%	588	3.48%	9,611	56.82%	16,915
Shannon	3,008	78.68%	632	16.53%	183	4.79%	2,376	62.15%	3,823
Shelby	2,487	79.41%	539	17.21%	106	3.38%	1,948	62.20%	3,132
St. Charles	125,442	57.45%	83,855	38.40%	9,068	4.15%	41,587	19.04%	218,365
St. Clair	3,867	78.57%	909	18.47%	146	2.97%	2,958	60.10%	4,922
St. Francois	19,622	71.86%	6,472	23.70%	1,210	4.43%	13,150	48.16%	27,304
St. Louis City	18,577	16.36%	90,150	79.37%	4,853	4.27%	-71,573	-63.02%	113,580
St. Louis County	191,288	38.78%	285,224	57.83%	16,721	3.39%	-93,936	-19.04%	493,233
Ste. Genevieve	6,362	69.01%	2,486	26.97%	371	4.02%	3,876	42.04%	9,219
Stoddard	10,868	82.61%	1,764	13.41%	523	3.98%	9,104	69.21%	13,155
Stone	14,727	79.25%	3,196	17.20%	661	3.56%	11,531	62.05%	18,584
Sullivan	1,930	80.82%	394	16.50%	64	2.68%	1,536	64.32%	2,388
Taney	20,031	77.07%	4,854	18.68%	1,106	4.26%	15,177	58.39%	25,991
Texas	9,228	82.05%	1,533	13.63%	486	4.32%	7,695	68.42%	11,247
Vernon	6,758	77.52%	1,671	19.17%	289	3.31%	5,087	58.35%	8,718
Warren	14,137	72.67%	4,653	23.92%	664	3.41%	9,484	48.75%	19,454
Washington	7,498	76.74%	1,768	18.09%	505	5.17%	5,730	58.64%	9,771
Wayne	4,494	80.35%	809	14.46%	290	5.19%	3,685	65.89%	5,593
Webster	15,119	78.30%	3,263	16.90%	926	4.80%	11,856	61.40%	19,308
Worth	843	79.23%	188	17.67%	33	3.10%	655	61.56%	1,064
Wright	7,620	86.42%	963	10.92%	234	2.65%	6,657	75.50%	8,817
Totals	1,671,771	57.38%	1,121,608	38.50%	119,991	4.12%	550,163	18.88%	2,913,370

==== By congressional district ====
Wasinger won six of eight congressional districts.

District	Wasinger	Brown	Representative
1st	20%	75%	Cori Bush (118th Congress)
1st	20%	75%	Wesley Bell (119th Congress)
2nd	54%	42%	Ann Wagner
3rd	62%	34%	Blaine Luetkemeyer (118th Congress)
3rd	62%	34%	Bob Onder (119th Congress)
4th	68%	27%	Mark Alford
5th	36%	59%	Emanuel Cleaver
6th	67%	29%	Sam Graves
7th	70%	26%	Eric Burlison
8th	74%	22%	Jason Smith

== Notes ==
Partisan clients
