= Jewell Patek =

American politician

Member of the Missouri House of Representatives from the 7th district
- In office January 8, 1997 – 2001
- Preceded by: Dale Whiteside
- Succeeded by: John Quinn

Personal details
- Born: July 12, 1971 (age 55) Brookfield, Missouri
- Party: Republican

Jewell Patek (born July 12, 1971) is an American politician and lobbyist. He served in the Missouri House of Representatives from the 7th district from 1997 to 2001.

== Education ==
Patek graduated from University of Missouri School of Law in 1996.

== Career ==
=== House of Representatives ===
Patek represented the 7th district, including portions of Carroll, Linn and Livingston counties, in the Missouri House of Representatives for three terms, from 1997 to 2001. He also served as a military police officer in the Missouri National Guard during his tenure.

=== Lobbying ===
In 2003, Patek formed political lobbying firm Patek & Associates, based in Jefferson City. Clients include Google, Spire, Evergy, Smithfield Foods, Magellan Midstream Partners, St. Louis Regional Convention & Sports Authority, Heavy Constructors Association of Kansas City, Cheyenne International, Centerpointe Hospital, and the board of trustees at North Kansas City Hospital.

In 2017, Patek served as treasurer to the American Democracy Alliance PAC, which supported Eric Greitens's Right-to-work law.

In 2024, Mike Kehoe's opponents in the 2024 Missouri gubernatorial election criticized his rental of a bus owned by Patek, suggesting a vested interest to client Smithfield Food's Chinese owners WH Group. Smithfield previously donated to Casey Guernsey and Brian Munzlinger, who pushed for foreign land ownership in Missouri congress.

== Personal life ==
Patek has two daughters.
