= Aull =

Aull may refer to:

- Aull, Germany, a municipality in the district of Rhein-Lahn, Rhineland-Palatinate, Germany
- Ashley Aull (born 1985), American beauty queen
- Joe Aull (born 1948), American politician
- Margaret Aull, New Zealand painter
