= David Wasinger =

American attorney and politician

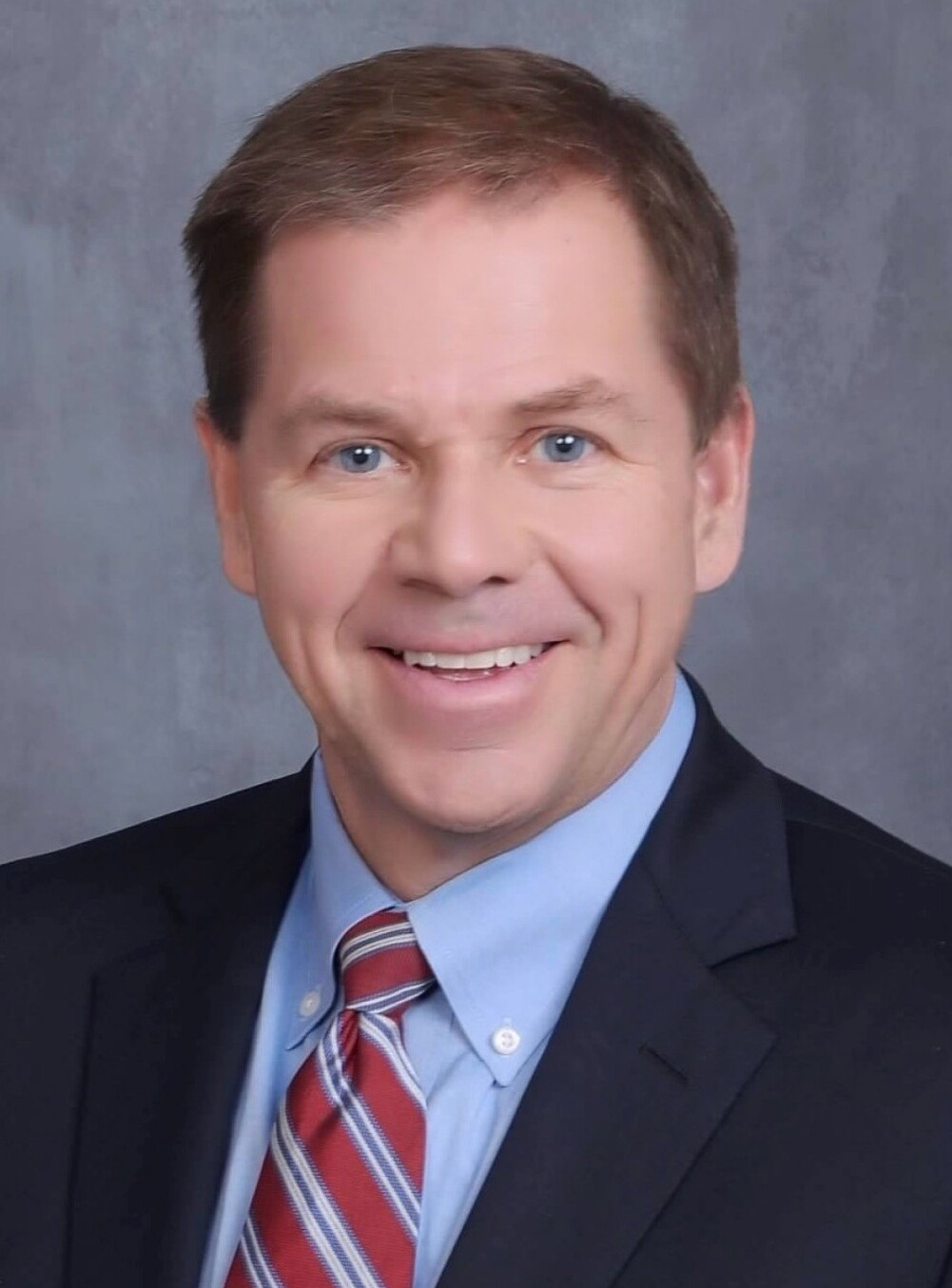

49th Lieutenant Governor of Missouri
- Incumbent
- Assumed office January 13, 2025
- Governor: Mike Kehoe
- Preceded by: Mike Kehoe

Personal details
- Born: August 9, 1963 (age 62) Hannibal, Missouri, U.S.
- Party: Republican
- Education: University of Missouri (BS); Vanderbilt University (JD)

David Gerard Wasinger (born August 9, 1963) is an American attorney, accountant, and politician who is serving as the 49th lieutenant governor of Missouri, since 2025. On November 5, 2024, he defeated Democratic nominee Richard Brown for Lieutenant Governor.

== Early life and education ==
Wasinger was born and raised in Hannibal, Missouri. He earned a Bachelor of Science degree in accounting from the University of Missouri and a Juris Doctor from the Vanderbilt University Law School. In law school, Wasinger was an associate editor of the Vanderbilt Law Review.

== Career ==
After earning his undergraduate degree, Wasinger worked as a Certified Public Accountant. In 1991, he joined a small law firm. In 2005, he was appointed to the Curators of the University of Missouri by Matt Blunt. In 2007, he represented the Missouri Civil Rights Initiative in an effort to eliminate affirmative action programs in Missouri through a ballot initiative.

Wasinger specializes in business law and successfully sued JPMorgan Chase on behalf of former vice-president Keith Edwards, and brought whistleblower Edward O’Donnell to settlement with Bank of America after the 2008 financial crisis.

He was a candidate in the 2018 Missouri State Auditor election, placing second in the Republican primary. Wasinger contributed $2.6 million to his own campaign for 2024 Missouri lieutenant gubernatorial election, winning the Republican nomination with 31% of the vote against Lincoln Hough.

== Personal life ==
Wasinger is a resident of Huntleigh, Missouri, and his wife Colleen formerly served on the St. Louis County Council. He is Roman Catholic.

Party political offices
Preceded by Mike Kehoe	Republican nominee for Lieutenant Governor of Missouri; 2024	Most recent
Political offices
Preceded by Mike Kehoe	Lieutenant Governor of Missouri; 2025–present	Incumbent
