= Senator Bentley =

Senator Bentley may refer to:

- John A. Bentley (1836–1912), Wisconsin State Senate
- Roseann Bentley (1936–2025), Missouri State Senate
