= Charlie Norr =

American politician

Member of the Missouri House of Representatives from the 132nd district
- In office 2013–2017
- Succeeded by: Crystal Quade

Personal details
- Born: July 1, 1944 (age 82) Baltimore, Maryland
- Party: Democratic
- Spouse: Peggy
- Children: 3
- Profession: Firefighter, paramedic

Charlie Norr (born July 1, 1944) is an American politician. He is a Democratic former member of the Missouri House of Representatives, having served from 2007 to 2011 and 2013 to 2017.

== Electoral history ==
=== State representative ===
Missouri House of Representatives Primary Election, August 8, 2006, District 137
Party	Candidate	Votes	%	±%
Democratic	Charlie Norr	635	56.10%	
Democratic	Robert M. Brantly	267	23.59%	
Democratic	Richard A. Napieralski	230	20.32%	

Missouri House of Representatives Election, November 7, 2006, District 137
Party	Candidate	Votes	%	±%
Democratic	Charlie Norr	4,567	55.89%	+11.64
Republican	Dan Scott	3,600	44.06%	−9.01
Write-In	Chris M. Fluharty	4	0.05%	+0.05

Missouri House of Representatives Election, November 4, 2008, District 137
Party	Candidate	Votes	%	±%
Democratic	Charlie Norr	7,250	65.22%	+9.33
Republican	Ronald D. Day	3,867	34.78%	−9.28

Missouri House of Representatives Election, November 2, 2010, District 137
Party	Candidate	Votes	%	±%
Democratic	Charlie Norr	2,792	47.50%	−17.72
Republican	Melissa Leach	3,086	52.50%	+17.72

Missouri House of Representatives Election, November 6, 2012, District 132
Party	Candidate	Votes	%	±%
Democratic	Charlie Norr	5,203	54.09%	+6.59
Republican	Melissa Leach	4,416	45.91%	−6.59

Missouri House of Representatives Election November 4, 2014, District 132
Party	Candidate	Votes	%	±%
Democratic	Charlie Norr	2,100	56.22%	+2.13
Republican	Fred Ellison	1,635	43.78%	−2.13

=== State Senate ===
Missouri Senate Election, November 6, 2018, District 30
Party	Candidate	Votes	%	±%
Republican	Lincoln Hough	34,987	53.27%	−46.73
Democratic	Charlie Norr	30,690	46.73%	+46.73
