= Richard Brown (Missouri politician) =

American politician

Member of the Missouri House of Representatives from the 27th district
- In office April 2017 – January 2025
- Preceded by: Bonnaye Mims
- Succeeded by: Melissa Douglas

Personal details
- Born: 1963 (age 61–62) Fort Riley, Kansas, U.S.
- Political party: Democratic
- Spouse(s): Monica Brown (m. 1986; div. 1999) Regina Brown (m. 2003; died 2018) Terese Brown (m. 2023)
- Education: University of Central Missouri (BS, MA); Webster University (MA)

Richard Brown (born 1963) is an American politician who was a member of the Missouri House of Representatives. A member of the Democratic Party, he was elected in November 2016 to represent the 27th district. He served as the assistant minority floor leader of the Missouri House of Representatives since 2019.

Brown was the Democratic nominee in the 2024 Missouri lieutenant gubernatorial election. He lost to Republican nominee David Wasinger in the general election.

== Early life and education ==
Born at Fort Riley in 1963, Brown attended the University of Central Missouri, earning his bachelor's degree in 1986 and a master's degree in 1996. He later received a Master of Arts from Webster University in 2018.

== Legislative career ==
Brown was elected in 2016 to the Missouri House of Representatives, representing the 27th district. He has served as the assistant minority floor leader since 2019

=== Committee assignments ===
- Joint Committee on Public Employee Retirement, Missouri State Legislature
- Pensions Committee, Missouri House of Representatives, Ranking Minority Member
- Professional Registration and Licensing Committee, Missouri House of Representatives, Ranking Minority Member
- Ethics, Vice Chair

== Personal life ==
Brown lives in Kansas City, Missouri.

== Electoral history ==
Missouri House of Representatives Democratic primary, August 2, 2016 (District 27)
Party	Candidate	Votes	%	±%
Democratic	Richard Brown	2,237	65.05%	0%
Democratic	Bonnaye Mims	1,202	34.95%	0%

Missouri House of Representatives election, November 6, 2016 (District 27)
Party	Candidate	Votes	%	±%
Democratic	Richard Brown	11,919	100%	+0%

Missouri House of Representatives election, November 6, 2018 (District 27)
Party	Candidate	Votes	%	±%
Democratic	Richard Brown	10,084	100%	+0%

Missouri House of Representatives election, November 6, 2020 (District 27)
Party	Candidate	Votes	%	±%
Democratic	Richard Brown	12,296	100%	+0%

Missouri House of Representatives election, November 8, 2022 (District 27)
Party	Candidate	Votes	%	±%
Democratic	Richard Brown	8,207	100.00%	0.00
Total votes		8,207	100.00%	

Missouri House of Representatives
Preceded by Bonnaye Mims	Member of the Missouri House of Representatives from the 27th district 2017–present	Incumbent
Party political offices
Preceded by Alissia Canady	Democratic nominee for Lieutenant Governor of Missouri; 2024	Most recent
