= Bonnaye Mims =

American politician (born 1952)

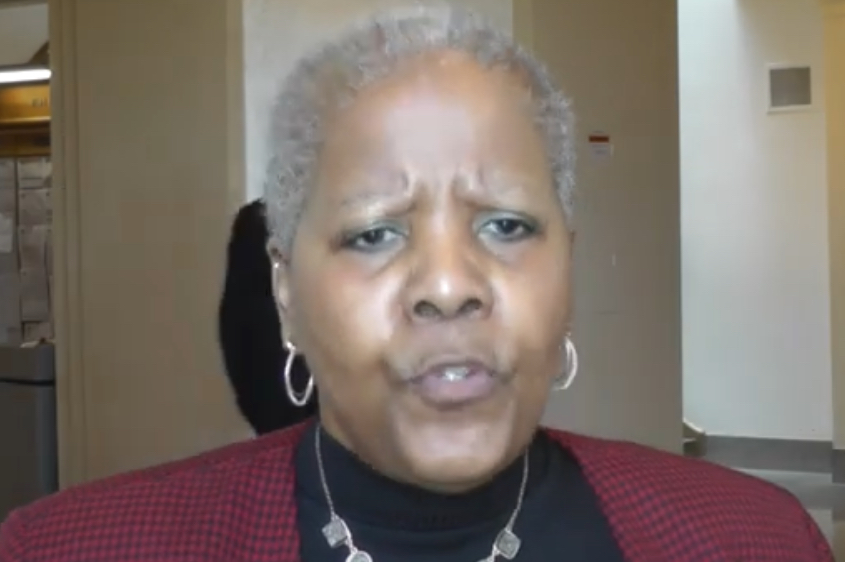
- Mims in 2013

Member of the Missouri House of Representatives from the 27th district
- In office 2013–2017
- Succeeded by: Richard Brown

Personal details
- Born: December 12, 1952 (age 73) Kansas City, Missouri
- Party: Democratic
- Children: 4
- Profession: forensic coordinator

Bonnaye Mims (born December 12, 1952) is an American politician. She is a member of the Missouri House of Representatives, having served since 2013. She is a member of the Democratic party. She lost her re-election bid to Richard Brown (Missouri politician) in 2016.
