= Gina Mitten =

American politician (born 1963)

Minority Leader of the Missouri House of Representatives Acting
- In office July 22, 2018 – January 9, 2019
- Preceded by: Gail McCann Beatty
- Succeeded by: Crystal Quade

Member of the Missouri House of Representatives from the 83rd district
- In office January 9, 2013 – January 6, 2021
- Preceded by: Tracy McCreery
- Succeeded by: Jo Doll

Personal details
- Born: November 1, 1963 (age 62) University City, Missouri, U.S.
- Party: Democratic
- Education: Washington University School of Law (BS) Ohio State University (JD)

Gina Mitten (born November 1, 1963) is an American politician who served in the Missouri House of Representatives from the 83rd district from 2013 to 2021.

== Career ==
Mitten is an attorney and former Administrative Law Judge, having received her Juris Doctor from Washington University School of Law in 2005. Mitten had previously dropped out of high school, but decided to return to school after becoming a mother, taking night classes at St. Louis Community College.

Gina Mitten was first elected in 2004 to the Richmond Heights City Council, representing District 3. She was re-elected in 2008 and 2012.

Mitten represented Missouri's 83rd District in the House of Representatives from 2013 to 2021, the maximum length allowed under Missouri term limits. During her time in the Missouri House of Representatives, Mitten served as the ranking Democrat on the Special Investigative Committee on Oversight, which was tasked with investigating then-Governor Eric Greitens for sexual abuse and campaign finance violations. Following the release of the committee's report, the Missouri Legislature convened a special session to consider impeaching Governor Greitens, leading to his resignation.

== Political views ==
Mitten has been an outspoken advocate for legal access to abortion. In 2014, Mitten led opposition in the Missouri House of Representatives to HB1307, which created a 72-hour waiting period for people seeking abortion.

Missouri House of Representatives
Preceded by Gail McCann Beatty	Minority Leader of the Missouri House of Representatives; Acting; 2018–2019	Succeeded by Crystal Quade
