= Roman Lee LeBlanc =

American politician (born 1971)

Member of the Missouri House of Representatives from the 43rd district
- In office 2009–2011
- Succeeded by: Gail Beatty

Personal details
- Born: September 21, 1971 (age 54)
- Party: Democratic

Roman Lee LeBlanc (born September 21, 1971) is an American politician. He was member of the Missouri House of Representatives for the 43rd district.
