= Dale Whiteside =

American politician (1930–2021)

Member of the Missouri House of Representatives from the 7th district
- In office January 6, 1993 – January 8, 1997
- Preceded by: Millie Humphreys
- Succeeded by: Jewell Patek

Member of the Missouri House of Representatives from the 11th district
- In office November 1987 – January 6, 1993
- Preceded by: Steve Danner
- Succeeded by: Philip Smith

Personal details
- Born: October 19, 1930 Chillicothe, Missouri
- Died: July 4, 2021 (aged 90) Chillicothe, Missouri
- Party: Republican

Dale Whiteside (October 19, 1930 – July 4, 2021) was an American politician who served in the Missouri House of Representatives from 1987 to 1997.

He died on July 4, 2021, in Chillicothe, Missouri, at age 90.
