= Carl M. Vogel =

American politician

Member of the Missouri Senate from the 6th district
- In office 2003–2011
- Succeeded by: Mike Kehoe

Personal details
- Born: March 7, 1955 Jefferson City, Missouri
- Died: April 14, 2016 (aged 61) St. Louis, Missouri
- Party: Republican
- Spouse: Kimberly
- Education: University of Missouri (BA)

Carl M. Vogel (March 7, 1955 – April 14, 2016) was a Republican member of the Missouri Senate, United States, who represented the 6th District from 2003 through 2011. Previously he was a member of the Missouri House of Representatives from 1991 through 2000.

He graduated from Helias High School in his native Jefferson City, Missouri, and later from the University of Missouri at Columbia, with a Bachelor of Arts degree. He and his wife, Kimberly, have two children, Jacob and Kristen.

He was the manager of the Jefferson City Coca-Cola Bottling Company. He was a member of the St. Joseph Cathedral, the Lions International, the Jaycees, the Roman Catholic men's organization, the Knights of Columbus, and Rotary International.

He had previously served as the Jefferson City Housing Authority Commissioner. While in the Missouri Senate, Vogel served as the chair of the Way and Means Committee, vice chair of the Small Business, Insurance and Industrial Relations Committee, and a member of the Economic Development, Tourism and Local Government Committee. Vogel died on April 14, 2016, at Barnes-Jewish Hospital, in St. Louis, from pancreatic cancer.
