= Crystal Quade =

American politician (born 1985)

Minority Leader of the Missouri House of Representatives
- In office January 9, 2019 – January 8, 2025
- Preceded by: Gina Mitten (acting)
- Succeeded by: Ashley Aune

Member of the Missouri House of Representatives from the 132nd district
- In office January 2017 – January 8, 2025
- Preceded by: Charlie Norr
- Succeeded by: Jeremy Dean

Personal details
- Born: August 16, 1985 (age 40) Missouri, U.S.
- Party: Democratic
- Spouse: Kevin Waterland
- Children: 3
- Education: Missouri State University (BA)
- Website: Campaign website; State House website

Crystal Quade (born August 16, 1985) is an American politician who served as Minority Leader in the Missouri House of Representatives, representing the 132nd district. She is a member of the Democratic Party.

On July 9, 2023, Quade announced her candidacy in the 2024 Missouri gubernatorial election. On August 6, 2024, she won the Democratic nomination, but lost to Republican nominee Mike Kehoe in the general election on November 5, 2024.

== Education and early career ==
Quade was the first person in her immediate family to graduate from high school. She graduated from Missouri State University with a bachelor's degree in social work. Quade developed a strong interest in politics after taking a college course in policy, and after graduating from college, Quade worked as a legislative staff member for then-U.S. Senator Claire McCaskill. Prior to being elected to a seat in the Missouri House of Representatives, Quade was the former chapter services director of Care to Learn, a non-profit organization that provides funding to address health, hunger, and hygiene needs of schoolchildren in multiple Missouri public school districts.

== Legislative career ==
=== Elections ===
In 2016, then-Missouri State Representative Charlie Norr did not seek re-election. Two Democrats, two Republicans, and one Libertarian filed to run in the 2016 race in the 132nd Missouri state representative district. Quade defeated Bob Sweere in the Democratic primary to win the Democratic nomination, and Quade defeated Republican nominee Thomas Quinn and Libertarian nominee Chris Burros by receiving 5,215 votes to Quinn's 4,243 votes to Burros's 521 votes.

In 2018, Quade ran for re-election in the 132nd Missouri state representative district, winning the Democratic primary unopposed and running against Republican nominee Sarah Semple in the general election. Quade was re-elected by receiving 5,383 votes to Semple's 2,982 votes.

Quade was endorsed by Missouri AFL-CIO in her run for Governor.

=== Tenure ===
As a state legislator, Quade serves on the Budget Committee and the Committee on Government Efficiencies, as well as the Missouri General Assembly's Joint Committee on Child Abuse and Neglect. In September 2017, less than a full year after being sworn into office, Quade was elected vice chairperson of the minority caucus of the Missouri House of Representatives by her Democratic colleagues.

Following the 2018 state legislative elections in Missouri, Quade was elected Minority Leader of the Missouri House of Representatives for the 2019 Missouri legislative session.

== Personal life ==
Quade and her husband Kevin live in Springfield, Missouri with their three children.

== Electoral history ==
Missouri House of Representatives Primary Election, August 2, 2016, District 132
| Party | Candidate | Votes | % | ±% |
|---|---|---|---|---|
| Democratic | Crystal Quade | 901 | 63.81% | |
| Democratic | Bob Sweere | 511 | 36.19% | |
| Total votes | | 1,412 | 100.00% | |

Missouri House of Representatives Election, November 8, 2016, District 132
| Party | Candidate | Votes | % | ±% |
|---|---|---|---|---|
| Democratic | Crystal Quade | 5,215 | 52.26% | |
| Republican | Thomas Quinn | 4,243 | 42.52% | |
| Libertarian | Chris Burros | 521 | 5.22% | |
| Total votes | | 9,979 | 100.00% | |

Missouri House of Representatives Election, November 6, 2018, District 132
| Party | Candidate | Votes | % | ±% |
|---|---|---|---|---|
| Democratic | Crystal Quade | 5,383 | 64.35% | +12.09 |
| Republican | Sarah Semple | 2,982 | 35.65% | −6.87 |
| Total votes | | 8,365 | 100.00% | |

Missouri House of Representatives Election, November 3, 2020, District 132
| Party | Candidate | Votes | % | ±% |
|---|---|---|---|---|
| Democratic | Crystal Quade | 6,289 | 59.28% | −5.07 |
| Republican | Sarah Semple | 4,320 | 40.72% | +5.07 |
| Total votes | | 10,609 | 100.00% | |

Missouri House of Representatives Election, November 8, 2022, District 132
| Party | Candidate | Votes | % | ±% |
|---|---|---|---|---|
| Democratic | Crystal Quade | 3,968 | 56.34% | −2.94 |
| Republican | Stephanos Freeman | 3,075 | 43.66% | +2.94 |
| Total votes | | 7,043 | 100.00% | |

2024 Missouri Democratic gubernatorial primary results
| Party | Candidate | Votes | % |
|---|---|---|---|
| Democratic | Crystal Quade | 190,228 | 50.2 |
| Democratic | Mike Hamra | 119,901 | 31.7 |
| Democratic | Eric Morrison | 37,084 | 9.8 |
| Democratic | Sheryl Gladney | 25,370 | 6.7 |
| Democratic | Hollis Laster | 5,990 | 1.6 |
| Total votes | | 378,573 | 100.0 |

2024 Missouri gubernatorial election
| Party | Candidate | Votes | % | ±% |
|---|---|---|---|---|
| Republican | Mike Kehoe | 1,750,802 | 59.14% | ▲2.03% |
| Democratic | Crystal Quade | 1,146,173 | 38.72% | ▼1.97% |
| Libertarian | Bill Slantz | 40,908 | 1.38% | ▼0.25% |
| Green | Paul Lehmann | 22,359 | 0.76% | ▲0.19% |
| Write-in | | 24 | 0.00% | Steady |
| Total votes | | 2,960,266 | 100.00% | N/A |
| Republican hold | | | | |

Missouri House of Representatives
| Preceded by Gina Mitten; Acting | Minority Leader of the Missouri House of Representatives; 2019–2025 | Succeeded by Ashley Aune |
Party political offices
| Preceded by Nicole Galloway | Democratic nominee for Governor of Missouri; 2024 | Most recent |
