= Gail McCann Beatty =

American politician (born 1965)

Minority Leader of the Missouri House of Representatives
- In office January 4, 2017 – July 22, 2018
- Preceded by: Jacob Hummel
- Succeeded by: Gina Mitten (Acting)

Member of the Missouri House of Representatives from the 26th district
- In office January 9, 2013 – July 22, 2018
- Preceded by: Joe Aull
- Succeeded by: Ashley Bland Manlove

Member of the Missouri House of Representatives from the 43rd district
- In office January 5, 2011 – January 9, 2013
- Preceded by: Roman Lee LeBlanc
- Succeeded by: Jay Houghton

Personal details
- Born: October 29, 1965 (age 60) Kansas City, Missouri, U.S.
- Party: Democratic
- Education: Stanford University (BA)

Gail McCann Beatty (born October 29, 1965) is an American politician who served in the Missouri House of Representatives from 2011 to 2018.

Director of Assessment for the Jackson County, Missouri

Missouri House of Representatives
Preceded by Jacob Hummel	Minority Leader of the Missouri House of Representatives; 2017–2018	Succeeded by Gina Mitten; Acting
