= Joe Aull =

American politician (born 1948)

Mayor of Lexington, Missouri
- Incumbent
- Assumed office November 13, 2019
- Preceded by: Fred Wiedner

Member of the Missouri House of Representatives from the 26th district
- In office January, 2005 – January 9, 2013
- Preceded by: Jim Seigfreid
- Succeeded by: Gail McCann Beatty

Personal details
- Born: July 14, 1948 (age 78) Kansas City, Missouri
- Party: Democratic
- Spouse: Candee Aull
- Education: Westminster College; University of Central Missouri
- Profession: Teacher; Politics

Joe Aull (born July 14, 1948) is the mayor of Lexington, Missouri. He carried out a successful write-in campaign for the November 5, 2019 general election, with an estimated victory of 600 votes against 200 votes. From 2005 until 2012, he was a Democratic member of the Missouri House of Representatives. He represented the 26th District, encompassing all or parts of Lafayette and Saline counties. Aull was first elected to the Missouri House in 2004, and reelected in 2006, 2008, and 2010. By Missouri law he was term-limited and was not able to run for the Missouri House again in 2012.

== Personal history ==
Joseph Aull was born in Kansas City, Missouri. After graduation from Lexington, Missouri High School in 1966 he attended Westminster College in Fulton, Missouri, earning a Bachelor of Arts degree in 1970. Rep. Aull further received a master's degree in education from Central Missouri State University in 1975, and an Education Specialist certificate from that same institution in 1987. Prior to entering politics Joe Aull worked in the education field for 34 years serving in a variety of positions from teacher and coach to principal and school district superintendent. He is a past president of the Missouri State High School Activities Association (MSHSAA). Joe Aull and wife Candee are the parents of five children.

== Political history ==
Joe Aull was first elected to the Missouri House of Representatives in November, 2004, defeating Republican Kevin Begley. Rep. Aull ran unopposed in 2006, 2008, and 2010. He was prohibited by Missouri term limit law from running again for the Missouri House in 2012. In November 2019, Aull was elected mayor of Lexington, Missouri through a write-in campaign. On 3 January 2022, President Joe Biden appointed Aull to serve as the State Executive Director for the USDA Missouri Farm Service Agency (FSA).

Missouri 26th District State Representative Election 2004
Party	Candidate	Votes	%	±%
Republican	Kevin Begley	5,330	35.6	
Democratic	Joe Aull	9,622	64.4	Winner

=== Legislative assignments ===
As a Missouri State Representative, Aull served on the following committees during the 96th General Assembly:

- Agriculture Policy
- Elementary and Secondary Education
- Emerging Issues in Animal Agriculture
- Joint Committee on Education
- Rural Community Development
