= Norma Champion =

American politician

Member of the Missouri Senate from the 30th district
- In office January 8, 2003 – January 5, 2011
- Preceded by: Roseann Bentley
- Succeeded by: Bob Dixon

Member of the Missouri House of Representatives from the 134th district
- In office January 6, 1993 – January 8, 2003
- Preceded by: M. Douglas Harpool
- Succeeded by: James Viebrock

Personal details
- Born: January 21, 1933 (age 93) Oklahoma City, Oklahoma
- Party: Republican

Norma Champion (born January 21, 1933) is a former children's TV show host and retired university professor who served as a Republican in both the Missouri House of Representatives from 1993 through 2003 and the Missouri State Senate from 2003 through 2011. She is a resident of Springfield, Missouri.

Norma received her master's degree in communications from Southwest Missouri State College and a Ph.D. in educational communications technology from the University of Oklahoma. She went on to do post-graduate study at the University of London. After completing her studies, she served as professor of Broadcasting and Communication Theory at Evangel University, and, from 1957 to 1986, was the writer, producer, and host of the television program The Children's Hour on KYTV.

In 1987, Norma was elected to the Springfield (MO) city council. She served in that body through 1992, when she was elected to the Missouri House of Representatives, She served in that body through 2002, when she was elected to the Missouri State Senate. During her eight years in the Senate, she served on the following committees:

- Gubernatorial Appointments
- Health, Mental Health, Seniors and Families (chair)
- Education (vice chair)
- Appropriations
- Rules

In 2009, Norma was awarded the General Superintendent's Medal of Honor from the Assemblies of God Fellowship.

In 2011, Norma was named Professor Emerita at Evangel University.

On June 7, 2014, Norma was inducted into the Missouri Broadcasters Association Hall of Fame—the first woman to receive this honor.
