= 2024 Missouri gubernatorial election =

- November 5, 2024
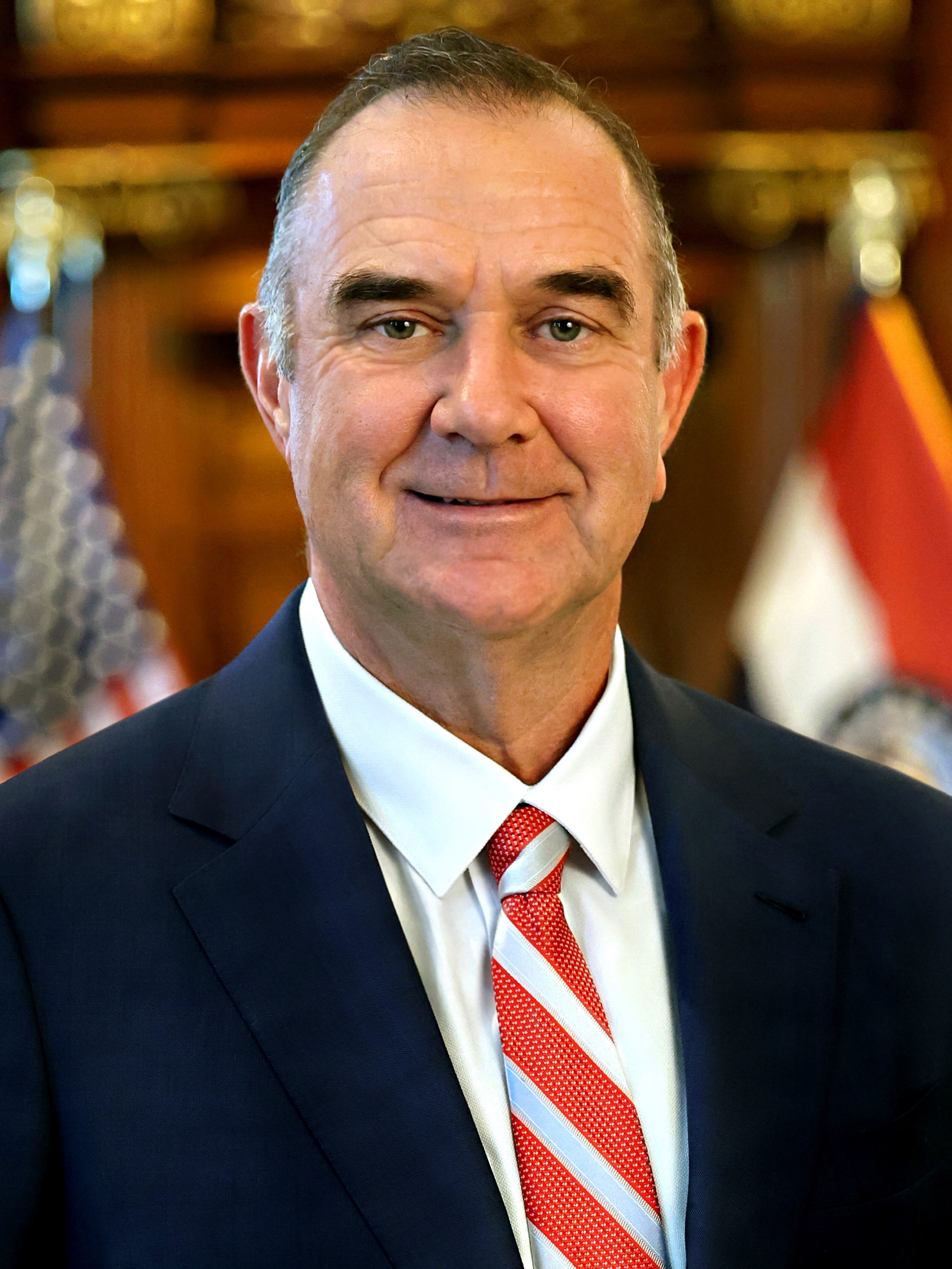

| Nominee | Mike Kehoe | Crystal Quade |
| Party | Republican | Democratic |
| Popular vote | 1,750,802 | 1,146,173 |
| Percentage | 59.14% | 38.72% |
- Kehoe: 40–50% 50–60% 60–70% 70–80% 80–90% >90% Quade: 40–50% 50–60% 60–70% 70–80% 80–90% >90% Tie: 40–50% 50% No votes
Governor before election
Mike Parson
Republican
Elected Governor
Mike Kehoe
Republican

The 2024 Missouri gubernatorial election was held on November 5, 2024, to elect the governor of Missouri, concurrently with the 2024 U.S. presidential election, as well as elections to the United States Senate, the United States House of Representatives, and various state and local elections. Incumbent Republican Governor Mike Parson was term-limited and could not seek re-election to a second full term in office due to having served more than two years of predecessor Eric Greitens's unexpired term following his resignation in June 2018. The Republican nominee, incumbent lieutenant governor Mike Kehoe, defeated the Democratic nominee, minority Leader of the Missouri House of Representatives Crystal Quade, to succeed Parson.

Primary elections took place on August 6, 2024. Mike Kehoe, the incumbent lieutenant governor, won the Republican nomination, while Crystal Quade, the Minority Leader of the Missouri House of Representatives, won the Democratic nomination. Kehoe defeated Quade in the general election with 59.1 percent of the vote.

A former bellwether state, Missouri has politically trended rightward in recent years and is today a Republican stronghold at both the federal and state levels. The last Democrat to hold the office of governor in Missouri was Jay Nixon, who comfortably won re-election in 2012. In 2020, Parson won by 16.41%, the first time a Republican gubernatorial candidate won by a double-digit margin since John Ashcroft's landslide re-election in 1988. Major news organizations predicted that the state would elect another Republican governor in 2024. Kehoe’s 20.4 point margin of victory is the largest for a Republican in an open-seat Missouri gubernatorial election since Reconstruction.

== Republican primary ==
=== Candidates ===
==== Nominee ====
- Mike Kehoe, Lieutenant Governor of Missouri (2018–2025)

==== Eliminated in primary ====
- Jay Ashcroft, Missouri Secretary of State (2017–2025) and son of former governor John Ashcroft
- Bill Eigel, state senator from the 23rd district (2017-2025)
- Darren Grant
- Jeremy Gundel, write-in candidate for lieutenant governor in 2020
- Darrell McClanahan, stay-at-home parent, honorary KKK member, and candidate for U.S. Senate in 2022
- Robert Olson, candidate for U.S. Senate in 2022
- Amber Thomsen
- Chris Wright, businessman and former police officer

=== Endorsements ===
Jay Ashcroft

Executive Branch officials

- Donald Trump, president of the United States (co-endorsement with Eigel and Kehoe)

Statewide officials

- Mike Huckabee, former governor of Arkansas

Organizations

- Missouri Right to Life
Bill Eigel

Executive Branch officials

- Donald Trump, president of the United States (co-endorsement with Ashcroft and Kehoe)

U.S. representatives

- Matt Gaetz, U.S. representatives from Florida's 1st congressional district
Mike Kehoe

Executive Branch officials

- Donald Trump, president of the United States (co-endorsement with Ashcroft and Eigel)

Statewide officials

- Mike Parson, incumbent governor of Missouri

Labor unions

- Fire Fighter Association of Missouri
- Missouri Fraternal Order of Police

Organizations

- American Council of Engineering Companies of Missouri
- Associated General Contractors of Missouri
- Missouri Automobile Dealers Association
- Missouri Cattlemen Association
- Missouri Chamber of Commerce
- Missouri Corn Growers Association
- Missouri Farm Bureau
- Missouri Forest Products Association
- Missouri Hospital Association
- Missouri Soybean Association

=== Polling ===
| Poll source | Date(s) administered | Sample size (Note: Key: A – all adults RV – registered voters LV – likely voters V – unclear) | Margin of error | Jay Ashcroft | Bill Eigel | Mike Kehoe | Other | Undecided |
|---|---|---|---|---|---|---|---|---|
| Battleground Connect (R) (Note: Poll commissioned by the Missouri Scout) | July 30–31, 2024 | 896 (LV) | ± 3.1% | 26% | 17% | 26% | 16% (Note: Darrell McClanahan III with 7%; Amber Thomsen with 4%; Jeremy Gundel with 2%; Robert Olson, Chris Wright, and Darren Grant with 1%) | 15% |
| Remington Research Group (R) | July 22–24, 2024 | 864 (LV) | ± 3.3% | 29% | 18% | 29% | 9% | 15% |
| co/efficient (R) | July 21–22, 2024 | 981 (LV) | ± 3.92% | 18% | 18% | 22% | 9% (Note: "Someone else" with 9%) | 33% |
| ARW Strategies (R) | June 27–30, 2024 | 600 (LV) | ± 4.0% | 19% | 19% | 24% | – | 38% |
| Remington Research Group (R) | June 19–20, 2024 | 701 (LV) | ± 3.6% | 31% | 9% | 29% | – | 31% |
| Emerson College | June 17–19, 2024 | 1,000 (RV) | ± 3.0% | 23% | 6% | 20% | 5% (Note: Robert Olson with 2%; Darrell McClanahan, Amber Thomsen and Chris Wright with 1%; Darren Grant and Jeremy Gundel with 0%) | 46% |
| American Viewpoint (R) (Note: Poll commissioned by the American Dream PAC, which supports Kehoe) | June 2–4, 2024 | 800 (LV) | ± 3.5% | 27% | 16% | 27% | – | 30% |
| Peak Insights (R) | May 15–18, 2024 | 400 (LV) | ± 5.0% | 22% | 14% | 20% | – | 42% |
| American Viewpoint (R) | May 13–15, 2024 | 600 (LV) | – | 33% | 12% | 23% | – | 32% |
| Tyson Group (R) (Note: Poll sponsored by Building America's Future) | April 23–26, 2024 | 504 (LV) | ± 4.3% | 36% | 3% | 11% | 9% (Note: Amber Thomsen with 3%; Darren Grant and Robert Olsen with 2%; Jeremy Grundel and Chris Wright with 1%) | 40% |
| YouGov/Saint Louis University | February 14–26, 2024 | 414 (LV) | ± 5.5% | 28% | 8% | 10% | 4% (Note: Chris Wright with 3%; "Other" with 1%) | 49% |
| Remington Research Group (R) | February 14–15, 2024 | 706 (LV) | ± 3.6% | 35% | 5% | 22% | – | 38% |
| ARW Strategies (R) | February 5–7, 2024 | 611 (V) | ± 4.0% | 36% | 13% | 13% | – | 38% |
| Remington Research Group (R) | January 18–19, 2024 | 806 (LV) | ± 3.3% | 34% | 4% | 20% | – | 42% |
| Show Me Victories (D) | October 26–31, 2023 | 407 (LV) | ± 4.9% | 18% | 6% | 19% | – | 49% |
| Remington Research Group (R) | September 27–28, 2023 | 714 (LV) | ± 3.4% | 32% | 5% | 15% | – | 48% |
| Remington Research Group (R) | July 5–7, 2023 | 706 (LV) | ± 3.4% | 34% | 4% | 14% | – | 38% |
| Remington Research Group (R) | April 11–12, 2023 | 778 (LV) | ± 3.4% | 29% | 4% | 13% | – | 54% |
| Remington Research Group (R) | February 8–9, 2023 | 820 (LV) | ± 3.2% | 28% | 4% | 9% | – | 59% |
| Remington Research Group (R) | November 15–16, 2022 | 940 (LV) | ± 3.0% | 44% | 4% | 10% | – | 42% |
| Public Opinion Strategies (R) (Note: Poll sponsored by Committee for Liberty PAC, which supports Ashcroft) | March 8–10, 2022 | 500 (LV) | ± 4.4% | 54% | – | 19% | 8% | 19% |

=== Debates ===
| Dates | Location | Ashcroft | Eigel | Kehoe | Link |
|---|---|---|---|---|---|
| July 25, 2024 | St. Louis | Participant | Participant | Absent | YouTube |

=== Results ===
Results by county: Kehoe: >60%; 50–60%; 40–50%; 30–40%; Eigel: >50%; 40–50%; 30–40%; Ashcroft: 30–40%

Kehoe secured a modest victory, carrying 88 counties, as well as the city of St. Louis. He performed the best in Shelby County, while Eigel, the runner-up, earned his best result in Grundy County. Finally, Ashcroft narrowly surpassed Kehoe in Greene County.

Republican primary results
| Party | Candidate | Votes | % |
|---|---|---|---|
| Republican | Mike Kehoe | 274,840 | 39.4 |
| Republican | Bill Eigel | 227,012 | 32.6 |
| Republican | Jay Ashcroft | 162,086 | 23.2 |
| Republican | Amber Thomsen | 10,627 | 1.5 |
| Republican | Chris Wright | 9,358 | 1.3 |
| Republican | Darrell McClanahan | 5,637 | 0.8 |
| Republican | Robert Olson | 2,975 | 0.4 |
| Republican | Jeremy Gundel | 2,946 | 0.4 |
| Republican | Darren Grant | 1,866 | 0.3 |
| Total votes | | 697,347 | 100.0 |

== Democratic primary ==
=== Candidates ===
==== Nominee ====
- Crystal Quade, Minority Leader of the Missouri House of Representatives (2019–2025) from the 132nd district (2017–2025)

==== Eliminated in primary ====
- Sheryl Gladney, customer service agent
- Mike Hamra, restaurant conglomerate owner
- Hollis Laster
- Eric Morrison, pastor and candidate for governor in 2016 and 2020

==== Disqualified ====
- Sarah Unsicker, state representative from the 83rd district

=== Endorsements ===
Mike Hamra

Newspapers

- St. Louis Post-Dispatch
Crystal Quade

Statewide officials

- Bob Holden, former governor of Missouri (2001–2005)
- Jason Kander, former Missouri secretary of state (2013–2017)

State legislators

- 40 state legislators

Organizations

- Planned Parenthood Great Plains Votes
- National Women's Political Caucus
- Sierra Club of Missouri

Labor unions

- IBEW Missouri State Conference
- Missouri AFL-CIO
- SEIU Missouri/Kansas State Council

=== Polling ===
| Poll source | Date(s) administered | Sample size | Margin of error | Sheryl Gladney | Mike Hamra | Crystal Quade | Other | Undecided |
|---|---|---|---|---|---|---|---|---|
| Remington Research Group (R) | July 10–11, 2024 | 600 (LV) | ± 3.8% | 4% | 23% | 21% | 9% (Note: Eric Morrison with 6%; Hollis Laster with 3%) | 43% |
| YouGov/Saint Louis University | February 14–26, 2024 | 396 (LV) | ± 5.6% | 4% | 5% | 21% | 4% | 66% |
| Show Me Victories (D) | October 26–31, 2023 | 407 (RV) | ± 4.9% | – | 2% | 39% | – | 58% |
| Remington Research Group (R) | July 12–13, 2023 | 661 (LV) | ± 3.9% | – | 7% | 29% | – | 64% |

=== Results ===
Results by county: Quade: 60–70%; 50–60%; 40–50%; 30–40%; Hamra: 50–60%; 40–50%; 30–40%; 20–30%; Tie: 20–30%; 30–40%

Quade led the race, winning slightly more than half of the votes, as well as 90 county equivalents out of 115. (Note: Missouri is made up of 114 counties and the independent city of St. Louis) She performed the best in Greene County, where the city of Springfield is located. Conversely, Hamra recorded his best result in Harrison County, with some more than 50% of the vote. Morrison failed to win a single county, but still managed to tie Pemiscot County, earning as many votes there as Hamra did.

Democratic primary results
| Party | Candidate | Votes | % |
|---|---|---|---|
| Democratic | Crystal Quade | 189,822 | 50.2 |
| Democratic | Mike Hamra | 119,702 | 31.7 |
| Democratic | Eric Morrison | 36,985 | 9.8 |
| Democratic | Sheryl Gladney | 25,287 | 6.7 |
| Democratic | Hollis Laster | 5,973 | 1.6 |
| Total votes | | 377,769 | 100.0 |

== Third-party and independent candidates ==
=== Declared ===
- Paul Lehman (Green), farmer and nominee for secretary of state in 2020
- Bill Slantz (Libertarian), former chair of the Missouri Libertarian Party, perennial candidate, and nominee for governor in 2020

== General election ==
=== Predictions ===
| Source | Ranking | As of |
|---|---|---|
| The Cook Political Report | Solid R | June 13, 2024 |
| Inside Elections | Solid R | July 14, 2023 |
| Sabato's Crystal Ball | Safe R | June 4, 2024 |
| RCP | Likely R | July 13, 2024 |
| Elections Daily | Safe R | July 12, 2023 |
| CNalysis | Solid R | August 17, 2024 |

=== Post-primary endorsements ===
Crystal Quade (D)

Newspapers

- The Kansas City Star

=== Polling ===
| Poll source | Date(s) administered | Sample size | Margin of error | Mike Kehoe (R) | Crystal Quade (D) | Other | Undecided |
|---|---|---|---|---|---|---|---|
| Research Co. | November 2–3, 2024 | 450 (LV) | ± 4.6% | 52% | 38% | 3% | 7% |
| Remington Research Group (R) | October 28–29, 2024 | 721 (LV) | – | 51% | 40% | 1% (Note: Slantz (L) with 1%) | 8% |
| ActiVote | October 11–27, 2024 | 400 (LV) | ± 4.9% | 58% | 42% | – | – |
| Remington Research Group (R) | October 2–3, 2024 | 753 (LV) | ± 3.2% | 51% | 41% | 1% (Note: Slantz (L) with 1%) | 7% |
| ActiVote | September 3 – October 1, 2024 | 400 (LV) | ± 4.9% | 60% | 40% | – | – |
| Emerson College (Note: Poll sponsored by The Hill) | September 12–13, 2024 | 850 (LV) | ± 3.3% | 52% | 36% | 1% (Note: "Someone else" with 1%) | 11% |
| Remington Research Group (R) | September 4–5, 2024 | 940 (LV) | – | 52% | 34% | – | 14% |
| YouGov/Saint Louis University | August 8–16, 2024 | 900 (LV) | ± 3.8% | 51% | 41% | 3% (Note: "Other" with 3%) | 6% |
| Show Me Victories (D) | October 26–31, 2023 | 407 (RV) | ± 4.9% | 38% | 33% | – | 29% |

Hypothetical polling

Jay Ashcroft vs. Crystal Quade

| Poll source | Date(s) administered | Sample size | Margin of error | Jay Ashcroft (R) | Crystal Quade (D) | Other | Undecided |
|---|---|---|---|---|---|---|---|
| Remington Research Group (R) | March 6–8, 2024 | 713 (LV) | ± 3.9% | 53% | 36% | – | 11% |
| Show Me Victories (D) | October 26–31, 2023 | 407 (RV) | ± 4.9% | 39% | 34% | – | 27% |

Bill Eigel vs. Crystal Quade

| Poll source | Date(s) administered | Sample size | Margin of error | Bill Eigel (R) | Crystal Quade (D) | Other | Undecided |
|---|---|---|---|---|---|---|---|
| Show Me Victories (D) | October 26–31, 2023 | 407 (RV) | ± 4.9% | 33% | 34% | – | 33% |

Mike Kehoe vs. Mike Hamra

| Poll source | Date(s) administered | Sample size | Margin of error | Mike Kehoe (R) | Mike Hamra (D) | Other | Undecided |
|---|---|---|---|---|---|---|---|
| Show Me Victories (D) | October 26–31, 2023 | 407 (RV) | ± 4.9% | 37% | 27% | – | 36% |

Jay Ashcroft vs. Mike Hamra

| Poll source | Date(s) administered | Sample size | Margin of error | Jay Ashcroft (R) | Mike Hamra (D) | Other | Undecided |
|---|---|---|---|---|---|---|---|
| Show Me Victories (D) | October 26–31, 2023 | 407 (RV) | ± 4.9% | 39% | 29% | – | 32% |

Bill Eigel vs. Mike Hamra

| Poll source | Date(s) administered | Sample size | Margin of error | Bill Eigel (R) | Mike Hamra (D) | Other | Undecided |
|---|---|---|---|---|---|---|---|
| Show Me Victories (D) | October 26–31, 2023 | 407 (RV) | ± 4.9% | 33% | 30% | – | 37% |

=== Debate ===
2024 Missouri gubernatorial election debate
| No. | Date | Host | Moderator | Link | Republican | Democratic | Libertarian | Green |
| Key: P Participant A Absent N Not invited I Invited W Withdrawn | | | | | | | | |
| Key: P Participant A Absent N Not invited I Invited W Withdrawn | | | | | Kehoe | Quade | Slantz | Lehmann |
|---|---|---|---|---|---|---|---|---|
| 1 | Sep. 20, 2024 | Missouri Press Association | David Lieb | YouTube | P | P | P | P |

=== Results ===
2024 Missouri gubernatorial election
| Party | Candidate | Votes | % | ±% |
|---|---|---|---|---|
| Republican | Mike Kehoe | 1,750,802 | 59.14% | ▲2.03% |
| Democratic | Crystal Quade | 1,146,173 | 38.72% | ▼1.97% |
| Libertarian | Bill Slantz | 40,908 | 1.38% | ▼0.25% |
| Green | Paul Lehmann | 22,359 | 0.76% | ▲0.19% |
| Write-in | | 24 | 0.00% | Steady |
| Total votes | | 2,960,266 | 100.00% | N/A |
| Republican hold | | | | |

==== By county ====
| County | Mike Kehoe Republican | | Crystal Quade Democratic | | Various candidates Other parties | | Margin | | Total |
| County | # | % | # | % | # | % | # | % | Total |
|---|---|---|---|---|---|---|---|---|---|
| Adair | 6,967 | 68.90% | 2,918 | 28.86% | 227 | 2.24% | 4,049 | 40.04% | 10,112 |
| Andrew | 7,311 | 75.54% | 2,138 | 22.09% | 229 | 2.37% | 5,173 | 53.45% | 9,678 |
| Atchison | 2,125 | 81.05% | 427 | 16.29% | 70 | 2.67% | 1,698 | 64.76% | 2,622 |
| Audrain | 7,622 | 73.41% | 2,484 | 23.92% | 277 | 2.67% | 5,138 | 49.48% | 10,383 |
| Barry | 12,721 | 79.79% | 2,920 | 18.31% | 303 | 1.90% | 9,801 | 61.47% | 15,944 |
| Barton | 5,055 | 85.87% | 726 | 12.33% | 106 | 1.80% | 4,329 | 73.53% | 5,887 |
| Bates | 6,402 | 78.50% | 1,604 | 19.67% | 149 | 1.83% | 4,798 | 58.84% | 8,155 |
| Benton | 8,151 | 76.64% | 2,229 | 20.96% | 256 | 2.41% | 5,922 | 55.68% | 10,636 |
| Bollinger | 5,247 | 86.57% | 692 | 11.42% | 122 | 2.01% | 4,555 | 75.15% | 6,061 |
| Boone | 41,770 | 46.92% | 45,101 | 50.66% | 2,160 | 2.43% | −3,331 | −3.74% | 89,031 |
| Buchanan | 22,432 | 63.81% | 11,819 | 33.62% | 903 | 2.57% | 10,613 | 30.19% | 35,154 |
| Butler | 14,510 | 82.17% | 2,866 | 16.23% | 282 | 1.60% | 11,644 | 65.94% | 17,658 |
| Caldwell | 3,601 | 77.49% | 940 | 20.23% | 106 | 2.28% | 2,661 | 57.26% | 4,647 |
| Callaway | 15,250 | 71.61% | 5,413 | 25.42% | 633 | 2.97% | 9,837 | 46.19% | 21,296 |
| Camden | 19,104 | 75.95% | 5,519 | 21.94% | 532 | 2.11% | 13,585 | 54.01% | 25,155 |
| Cape Girardeau | 29,523 | 74.25% | 9,405 | 23.65% | 834 | 2.10% | 20,118 | 50.60% | 39,762 |
| Carroll | 3,623 | 81.27% | 754 | 16.91% | 81 | 1.82% | 2,869 | 64.36% | 4,458 |
| Carter | 2,467 | 87.54% | 322 | 11.43% | 29 | 1.03% | 2,145 | 76.12% | 2,818 |
| Cass | 38,034 | 65.06% | 19,112 | 32.69% | 1,318 | 2.25% | 18,922 | 32.37% | 58,464 |
| Cedar | 5,774 | 81.68% | 1,142 | 16.16% | 153 | 2.16% | 4,632 | 65.53% | 7,069 |
| Chariton | 3,131 | 77.58% | 832 | 20.61% | 73 | 1.81% | 2,299 | 56.96% | 4,036 |
| Christian | 37,568 | 74.71% | 11,822 | 23.51% | 897 | 1.78% | 25,746 | 51.20% | 50,287 |
| Clark | 2,616 | 80.10% | 556 | 17.02% | 94 | 2.88% | 2,060 | 63.07% | 3,266 |
| Clay | 67,765 | 52.60% | 58,365 | 45.31% | 2,693 | 2.09% | 9,400 | 7.30% | 128,823 |
| Clinton | 7,921 | 71.67% | 2,874 | 26.00% | 257 | 2.33% | 5,047 | 45.67% | 11,052 |
| Cole | 28,418 | 71.03% | 10,671 | 26.67% | 917 | 2.29% | 17,747 | 44.36% | 40,006 |
| Cooper | 6,378 | 72.62% | 2,166 | 24.66% | 239 | 2.72% | 4,212 | 47.96% | 8,783 |
| Crawford | 8,531 | 79.84% | 1,945 | 18.20% | 209 | 1.96% | 6,586 | 61.64% | 10,685 |
| Dade | 3,360 | 81.26% | 699 | 16.90% | 76 | 1.84% | 2,661 | 64.35% | 4,135 |
| Dallas | 6,665 | 79.79% | 1,508 | 18.05% | 180 | 2.15% | 5,157 | 61.74% | 8,353 |
| Daviess | 3,074 | 78.96% | 716 | 18.39% | 103 | 2.65% | 2,358 | 60.57% | 3,893 |
| DeKalb | 3,744 | 78.84% | 877 | 18.47% | 128 | 2.70% | 2,867 | 60.37% | 4,749 |
| Dent | 5,851 | 83.38% | 1,016 | 14.48% | 150 | 2.14% | 4,835 | 68.90% | 7,017 |
| Douglas | 5,998 | 83.55% | 1,041 | 14.50% | 140 | 1.95% | 4,957 | 69.05% | 7,179 |
| Dunklin | 8,040 | 81.40% | 1,652 | 16.73% | 185 | 1.87% | 6,388 | 64.68% | 9,877 |
| Franklin | 39,500 | 72.37% | 13,800 | 25.28% | 1,279 | 2.34% | 25,700 | 47.09% | 54,579 |
| Gasconade | 6,354 | 80.38% | 1,413 | 17.87% | 138 | 1.75% | 4,941 | 62.50% | 7,905 |
| Gentry | 2,639 | 81.45% | 553 | 17.07% | 48 | 1.48% | 2,086 | 64.38% | 3,240 |
| Greene | 84,418 | 58.96% | 55,938 | 39.07% | 2,833 | 1.98% | 28,480 | 19.89% | 143,189 |
| Grundy | 3,533 | 81.14% | 748 | 17.18% | 73 | 1.68% | 2,785 | 63.96% | 4,354 |
| Harrison | 3,243 | 85.19% | 530 | 13.92% | 34 | 0.89% | 2,713 | 71.26% | 3,807 |
| Henry | 7,957 | 74.17% | 2,527 | 23.56% | 244 | 2.27% | 5,430 | 50.62% | 10,728 |
| Hickory | 3,915 | 77.33% | 1,041 | 20.56% | 107 | 2.11% | 2,874 | 56.76% | 5,063 |
| Holt | 1,921 | 83.16% | 342 | 14.81% | 47 | 2.03% | 1,579 | 68.35% | 2,310 |
| Howard | 3,481 | 71.16% | 1,276 | 26.08% | 135 | 2.76% | 2,205 | 45.07% | 4,892 |
| Howell | 15,231 | 81.42% | 3,118 | 16.67% | 358 | 1.91% | 12,113 | 64.75% | 18,707 |
| Iron | 3,399 | 77.30% | 851 | 19.35% | 147 | 3.34% | 2,548 | 57.95% | 4,397 |
| Jackson | 123,793 | 39.46% | 182,448 | 58.15% | 7,509 | 2.39% | −58,655 | −18.69% | 313,750 |
| Jasper | 39,119 | 73.55% | 12,785 | 24.04% | 1,282 | 2.41% | 26,334 | 49.51% | 53,186 |
| Jefferson | 78,385 | 66.98% | 35,753 | 30.55% | 2,896 | 2.47% | 42,632 | 36.43% | 117,034 |
| Johnson | 15,991 | 68.60% | 6,751 | 28.96% | 569 | 2.44% | 9,240 | 39.64% | 23,311 |
| Knox | 1,462 | 84.07% | 245 | 14.09% | 32 | 1.84% | 1,217 | 69.98% | 1,739 |
| Laclede | 13,861 | 81.59% | 2,805 | 16.51% | 323 | 1.90% | 11,056 | 65.08% | 16,989 |
| Lafayette | 12,571 | 73.38% | 4,285 | 25.01% | 275 | 1.61% | 8,286 | 48.37% | 17,131 |
| Lawrence | 14,345 | 79.21% | 3,399 | 18.77% | 365 | 2.02% | 10,946 | 60.45% | 18,109 |
| Lewis | 3,573 | 80.97% | 756 | 17.13% | 84 | 1.90% | 2,817 | 63.83% | 4,413 |
| Lincoln | 24,149 | 76.36% | 6,759 | 21.37% | 719 | 2.27% | 17,390 | 54.98% | 31,627 |
| Linn | 4,285 | 76.26% | 1,208 | 21.50% | 126 | 2.24% | 3,077 | 54.76% | 5,619 |
| Livingston | 5,295 | 78.76% | 1,316 | 19.57% | 112 | 1.67% | 3,979 | 59.18% | 6,723 |
| Macon | 6,304 | 81.35% | 1,328 | 17.14% | 117 | 1.51% | 4,976 | 64.21% | 7,749 |
| Madison | 4,598 | 81.22% | 940 | 16.60% | 123 | 2.17% | 3,658 | 64.62% | 5,661 |
| Maries | 4,010 | 84.12% | 683 | 14.33% | 74 | 1.55% | 3,327 | 69.79% | 4,767 |
| Marion | 9,887 | 76.43% | 2,786 | 21.54% | 263 | 2.03% | 7,101 | 54.89% | 12,936 |
| McDonald | 7,668 | 83.25% | 1,328 | 14.42% | 215 | 2.33% | 6,340 | 68.83% | 9,211 |
| Mercer | 1,498 | 85.16% | 226 | 12.85% | 35 | 1.99% | 1,272 | 72.31% | 1,759 |
| Miller | 10,630 | 82.84% | 1,894 | 14.76% | 308 | 2.40% | 8,736 | 68.08% | 12,832 |
| Mississippi | 3,381 | 77.56% | 862 | 19.78% | 116 | 2.66% | 2,519 | 57.79% | 4,359 |
| Moniteau | 5,879 | 81.27% | 1,164 | 16.09% | 191 | 2.64% | 4,715 | 65.18% | 7,234 |
| Monroe | 3,475 | 80.66% | 756 | 17.55% | 77 | 1.79% | 2,719 | 63.12% | 4,308 |
| Montgomery | 4,702 | 79.41% | 1,098 | 18.54% | 121 | 2.04% | 3,604 | 60.87% | 5,921 |
| Morgan | 7,588 | 79.04% | 1,799 | 18.74% | 213 | 2.22% | 5,789 | 60.30% | 9,600 |
| New Madrid | 5,231 | 78.32% | 1,306 | 19.55% | 142 | 2.13% | 3,925 | 58.77% | 6,679 |
| Newton | 22,795 | 79.07% | 5,464 | 18.95% | 571 | 1.98% | 17,331 | 60.11% | 28,830 |
| Nodaway | 6,869 | 71.49% | 2,573 | 26.78% | 167 | 1.74% | 4,296 | 44.71% | 9,609 |
| Oregon | 3,715 | 82.19% | 715 | 15.82% | 90 | 1.99% | 3,000 | 66.37% | 4,520 |
| Osage | 6,777 | 87.74% | 817 | 10.58% | 130 | 1.68% | 5,960 | 77.16% | 7,724 |
| Ozark | 3,886 | 82.77% | 731 | 15.57% | 78 | 1.66% | 3,155 | 67.20% | 4,695 |
| Pemiscot | 3,800 | 74.71% | 1,199 | 23.57% | 87 | 1.71% | 2,601 | 51.14% | 5,086 |
| Perry | 7,847 | 82.46% | 1,501 | 15.77% | 168 | 1.77% | 6,346 | 66.69% | 9,516 |
| Pettis | 13,873 | 74.16% | 4,436 | 23.71% | 397 | 2.12% | 9,437 | 50.45% | 18,706 |
| Phelps | 13,690 | 71.60% | 4,952 | 25.90% | 477 | 2.49% | 8,738 | 45.70% | 19,119 |
| Pike | 6,083 | 78.63% | 1,548 | 20.01% | 105 | 1.36% | 4,535 | 58.62% | 7,736 |
| Platte | 30,102 | 52.31% | 26,328 | 45.75% | 1,114 | 1.94% | 3,774 | 6.56% | 57,544 |
| Polk | 12,487 | 79.38% | 2,940 | 18.69% | 304 | 1.93% | 9,547 | 60.69% | 15,731 |
| Pulaski | 11,197 | 73.17% | 3,680 | 24.05% | 426 | 2.78% | 7,517 | 49.12% | 15,303 |
| Putnam | 1,988 | 85.18% | 296 | 12.68% | 50 | 2.14% | 1,692 | 72.49% | 2,334 |
| Ralls | 4,560 | 79.85% | 1,046 | 18.32% | 105 | 1.84% | 3,514 | 61.53% | 5,711 |
| Randolph | 8,177 | 74.92% | 2,509 | 22.99% | 229 | 2.10% | 5,668 | 51.93% | 10,915 |
| Ray | 8,256 | 72.05% | 2,942 | 25.67% | 261 | 2.28% | 5,314 | 46.37% | 11,459 |
| Reynolds | 2,424 | 82.09% | 467 | 15.81% | 62 | 2.10% | 1,957 | 66.27% | 2,953 |
| Ripley | 4,872 | 85.61% | 712 | 12.51% | 107 | 1.88% | 4,160 | 73.10% | 5,691 |
| Saline | 6,433 | 69.67% | 2,591 | 28.06% | 210 | 2.27% | 3,842 | 41.61% | 9,234 |
| Schuyler | 1,552 | 82.51% | 284 | 15.10% | 45 | 2.39% | 1,268 | 67.41% | 1,881 |
| Scotland | 1,553 | 83.36% | 283 | 15.19% | 27 | 1.45% | 1,270 | 68.17% | 1,863 |
| Scott | 13,801 | 80.20% | 3,109 | 18.07% | 298 | 1.73% | 10,692 | 62.13% | 17,208 |
| Shannon | 3,182 | 81.46% | 643 | 16.46% | 81 | 2.07% | 2,539 | 65.00% | 3,906 |
| Shelby | 2,656 | 82.64% | 504 | 15.68% | 54 | 1.68% | 2,152 | 66.96% | 3,214 |
| St. Charles | 132,563 | 59.51% | 85,628 | 38.44% | 4,561 | 2.05% | 46,935 | 21.07% | 222,752 |
| St. Clair | 3,887 | 78.01% | 1,002 | 20.11% | 94 | 1.89% | 2,885 | 57.90% | 4,983 |
| St. Francois | 20,827 | 74.54% | 6,524 | 23.35% | 591 | 2.12% | 14,303 | 51.19% | 27,942 |
| St. Louis City | 21,393 | 18.56% | 91,034 | 78.99% | 2,814 | 2.44% | −69,641 | −60.43% | 115,241 |
| St. Louis County | 201,181 | 40.25% | 288,946 | 57.81% | 9,694 | 1.94% | −87,765 | −17.56% | 499,821 |
| Ste. Genevieve | 6,887 | 72.43% | 2,428 | 25.54% | 193 | 2.03% | 4,459 | 46.90% | 9,508 |
| Stoddard | 11,683 | 87.00% | 1,554 | 11.57% | 192 | 1.43% | 10,129 | 75.43% | 13,429 |
| Stone | 14,911 | 78.98% | 3,647 | 19.32% | 322 | 1.71% | 11,264 | 59.66% | 18,880 |
| Sullivan | 2,020 | 83.54% | 362 | 14.97% | 36 | 1.49% | 1,658 | 68.57% | 2,418 |
| Taney | 20,622 | 78.09% | 5,189 | 19.65% | 597 | 2.26% | 15,433 | 58.44% | 26,408 |
| Texas | 9,491 | 83.20% | 1,686 | 14.78% | 231 | 2.02% | 7,805 | 68.42% | 11,408 |
| Vernon | 7,050 | 79.77% | 1,603 | 18.14% | 185 | 2.09% | 5,447 | 61.63% | 8,838 |
| Warren | 14,719 | 74.39% | 4,644 | 23.47% | 423 | 2.14% | 10,075 | 50.92% | 19,786 |
| Washington | 7,999 | 79.89% | 1,771 | 17.69% | 243 | 2.43% | 6,228 | 62.20% | 10,013 |
| Wayne | 4,906 | 85.54% | 729 | 12.71% | 100 | 1.74% | 4,177 | 72.83% | 5,735 |
| Webster | 15,493 | 78.82% | 3,798 | 19.32% | 365 | 1.86% | 11,695 | 59.50% | 19,656 |
| Worth | 878 | 81.37% | 184 | 17.05% | 17 | 1.58% | 694 | 64.32% | 1,079 |
| Wright | 7,697 | 86.17% | 1,086 | 12.16% | 149 | 1.67% | 6,611 | 74.01% | 8,932 |
| Totals | 1,750,802 | 59.14% | 1,146,173 | 38.72% | 63,291 | 2.14% | 604,629 | 20.42% | 2,960,266 |

==== By congressional district ====
Kehoe won six of eight congressional districts.

| District | Kehoe | Quade | Representative |
|---|---|---|---|
| 1st | 22% | 75% | Cori Bush (118th Congress) |
| 1st | 22% | 75% | Wesley Bell (119th Congress) |
| 2nd | 56% | 42% | Ann Wagner |
| 3rd | 64% | 33% | Blaine Luetkemeyer (118th Congress) |
| 3rd | 64% | 33% | Bob Onder (119th Congress) |
| 4th | 70% | 28% | Mark Alford |
| 5th | 38% | 60% | Emanuel Cleaver |
| 6th | 69% | 29% | Sam Graves |
| 7th | 70% | 28% | Eric Burlison |
| 8th | 76% | 22% | Jason Smith |

== Notes ==
Partisan clients
