= Mike Kehoe =

Governor of Missouri since 2025

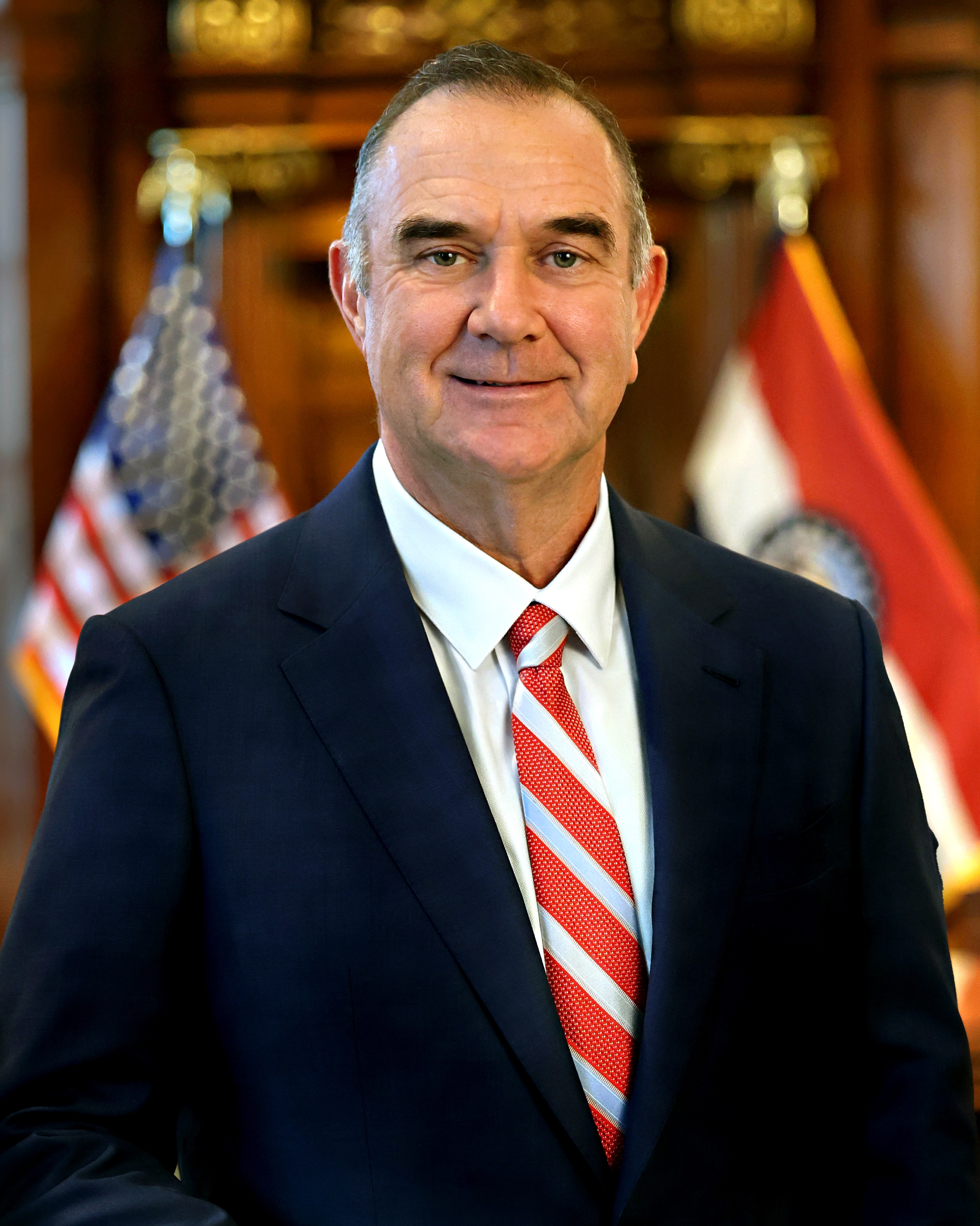
- Official portrait, 2025

58th Governor of Missouri
- Incumbent
- Assumed office January 13, 2025
- Lieutenant: David Wasinger
- Preceded by: Mike Parson

48th Lieutenant Governor of Missouri
- In office June 18, 2018 – January 13, 2025
- Governor: Mike Parson
- Preceded by: Mike Parson
- Succeeded by: David Wasinger

Majority Leader of the Missouri Senate
- In office September 15, 2015 – June 18, 2018
- Preceded by: Ron Richard
- Succeeded by: Caleb Rowden

Member of the Missouri Senate from the 6th district
- In office January 5, 2011 – June 18, 2018
- Preceded by: Carl M. Vogel
- Succeeded by: Mike Bernskoetter

Personal details
- Born: Michael Leo Kehoe; January 17, 1962 (age 64) St. Louis, Missouri, U.S.
- Party: Republican
- Spouse: Claudia Kehoe (m. 1989)
- Children: 4
- Website: Office website Campaign website
- Kehoe's voice Kehoe on fraud enforcement actions in Missouri. Recorded September 14, 2026

Michael Leo Kehoe (/kiːhoʊ/ KEE-hoh; born January 17, 1962) is an American politician serving as the 58th governor of Missouri since 2025. A member of the Republican Party, he served as the 48th lieutenant governor of Missouri from 2018 to 2025. Kehoe previously served in the Missouri Senate, representing the state's 6th senatorial district, and was majority leader from 2015 to 2018. On June 18, 2018, Governor Mike Parson appointed Kehoe as Missouri's lieutenant governor. Parson and Kehoe were elected to a full term in 2020.

Kehoe won the nomination for governor against State Senator Bill Eigel and Secretary of State Jay Ashcroft. On November 5, 2024, he defeated Democratic nominee Crystal Quade in the general election. He was inaugurated as the 58th governor of Missouri in January 2025.

== Early life ==
Kehoe was born and raised in the St. Louis area by his single mother, Lorraine Kehoe. He is the youngest of six children. His father left the family when he was one year old. After his father's departure, Lorraine worked multiple jobs simultaneously to support the family. Kehoe attended Catholic schools in the area, including Chaminade College Preparatory School.

At age 25, Kehoe began working for Osage Industries, a company involved with auto parts and manufacturing ambulances. After selling Osage Industries in 1992, he purchased an auto dealership in Jefferson City, Missouri, but sold it shortly after entering politics.

== Missouri Senate ==
In 2005, Governor Matt Blunt appointed Kehoe to the Missouri Highways and Transportation Commission. In 2010, without having held elected office before, Kehoe ran for the 6th District State Senate seat to succeed Carl Vogel. In a close Republican primary, he defeated three other candidates to advance to the general election, where he was unopposed.

During the 96th General Assembly, Kehoe served on the following committees:

- Vice-Chairman, Transportation Committee
- Member, Education Committee
- Member, Commerce Committee
- Member, Consumer Protection Committee
- Member, Energy & the Environment Committee

== Lieutenant Governor of Missouri ==
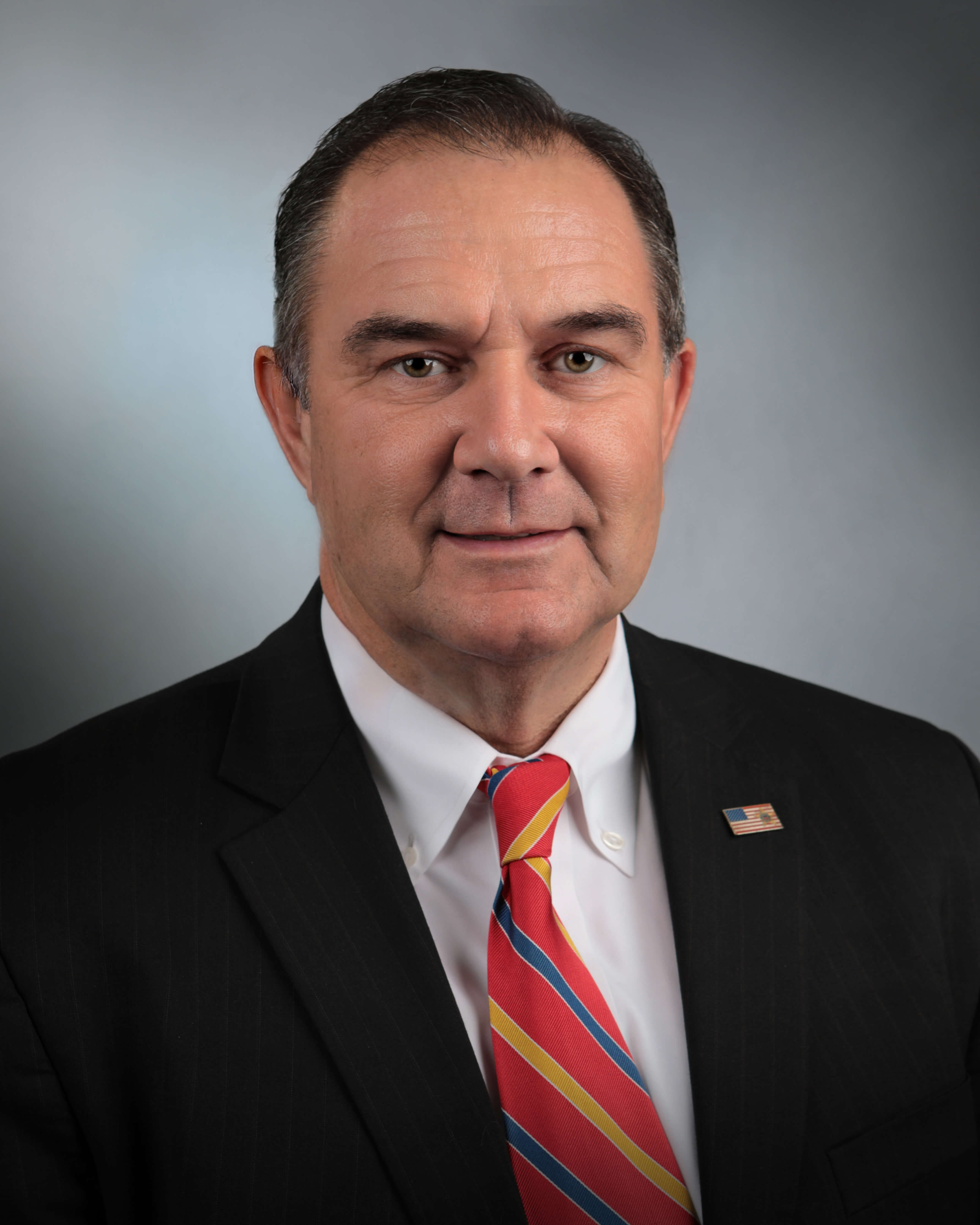
Mike Kehoe as Lieutenant governor

On June 18, 2018, Governor Mike Parson appointed Kehoe as lieutenant governor. The appointment came with legal uncertainty, as a state law (not the Constitution of Missouri) states that the governor can fill all vacancies "other than in the offices of lieutenant governor, state senator or representative, sheriff, or recorder of deeds in the city of St. Louis". The Constitution of Missouri states "The governor shall fill all vacancies in public offices unless otherwise provided by law, and his appointees shall serve until their successors are duly elected or appointed and qualified." Parson said he believed that the Constitution gave him authority to appoint Kehoe lieutenant governor.

The Democrats lost their lawsuit in the Cole County Circuit Court due to lack of standing and the vagueness of state law, which says the governor may not appoint the lieutenant governor but provides no process to fill the position. That lawsuit was on appeal in the Missouri Supreme Court, Appeal No. SC97284, with oral argument held on November 7, 2018. On April 16, 2019, the Missouri Supreme Court upheld Kehoe's appointment by a 5–2 vote. The decision, written by Chief Justice Zel Fischer, said, "Governor Parson was within his constitutional authority when he appointed Kehoe to the office of Lieutenant Governor".

Kehoe was elected lieutenant governor in his own right in 2020.

== Governor of Missouri ==
=== Campaign ===
In March 2021, Kehoe announced his intention to run for governor in 2024. As of July 2024, he had raised almost $13 million, receiving significant donations from businesses that bid for state contracts and Rex Sinquefield. Opponents criticized Kehoe for renting a charter bus for the campaign from lobbyist Jewell Patek, whose client Smithfield Foods is owned by Chinese agricultural company WH Group.

After Kehoe won the Republican primary, his campaign received donations from Torch Electronics, which has been in a prolonged legal battle with the state of Missouri over its unregulated slot machines, and Good Day Farms, a cannabis company. Both companies are clients of lobbyist Steven Tilley.

=== Tenure ===
==== Appointments ====
In April 2025, Kehoe withdrew his nomination of Tom Prater to the Missouri Board of Education after pressure from right-wing groups and Senator Mike Moon, who raised concerns about Prater's support for public schools and teacher unions and his involvement in a bipartisan civic group in Springfield, Missouri. Prater had already served on the board in an interim role, appointed by Mike Parson, and Kehoe's spokesperson told press that he was confident in Prater's qualifications for the role.

==== Ballot initiatives ====
In July 2025, Kehoe signed a law repealing a 2025 voter-approved ballot measure that would have increased the state's minimum wage and guaranteed paid sick leave for employees. In the August-September 2025 special session, Kehoe told legislators to pass a proposal to add barriers to initiative petitions for constitutional amendments. Kehoe slated 2026 Missouri Amendment 4 for the August 2026 ballot.

==== Education ====
In 2025, Kehoe prioritized increased funding for the MOScholars program, a tax-credit program that facilitates scholarships for private and parochial schools. The program, established in 2021, raised less than $25 million in donations the previous year. Kehoe presented a budget proposal that allocated $50 million for the program while underfunding the state education department. The state senate initially overruled the proposal, and the final draft included funding for both. Democratic representatives questioned both the legality and sustainability of general revenue funds for private school scholarships, and say this is a move toward privatizing education.

==== Housing ====
In July 2025, Kehoe signed a law allowing landlords to discriminate against tenants using housing vouchers, Social Security Disability Insurance, child support, and tips to pay rent. The law overturned Kansas City's source of income discrimination ban.

==== Redistricting ====
In August 2025, Kehoe called for a special session prioritizing redistricting in Missouri, in line with President Trump's demands for more Republican seats in the 2026 House of Representatives elections.

==== Taxes ====
Kehoe has advocated for measures to remove capital gains tax and income tax from Missouri revenue. He slated 2026 Missouri Amendment 5, which eliminates income tax and expands sales tax, on the August 2026 ballot.

== Personal life ==
Kehoe and his wife, Claudia, married in 1989 and have four children. He is the second Roman Catholic (after Thomas Eagleton) to have served as lieutenant governor of Missouri.

== Electoral history ==
=== State senator ===
Missouri 6th District State Senator Republican Primary 2010
Party	Candidate	Votes	%	±%
Republican	Mike Kehoe	12,250	39.7%	
Republican	Kenny Jones	10,201	33.0%	
Republican	Bill Deeken	5,133	16.6%	
Republican	Harry Otto	3,282	10.6%	

Missouri 6th District State Senator General Election 2010
Party	Candidate	Votes	%	±%
Republican	Mike Kehoe	52,402	100.0%	

Missouri 6th District State Senator Republican Primary 2014
Party	Candidate	Votes	%	±%
Republican	Mike Kehoe	25,142	100.0%	

Missouri 6th District State Senator General Election 2014
Party	Candidate	Votes	%	±%
Republican	Mike Kehoe	37,561	79.1%	
Democratic	Mollie Kristen Freebairn	9,937	20.9%	

=== Lieutenant governor ===
Missouri Lieutenant Governor Primary Election, August 4, 2020
Party	Candidate	Votes	%	±%
Republican	Mike Kehoe	362,442	59.41	
Republican	Mike Carter	158,914	26.05	
Republican	Aaron Wisdom	52,810	8.66	
Republican	Arnie C. Dienoff	35,929	5.89	

Missouri Lieutenant Governor General Election, November 3, 2020
Party	Candidate	Votes	%	±%
Republican	Mike Kehoe	1,720,202	57.11	
Democratic	Alissia Canady	1,150,231	38.81	
Libertarian	Bill Slantz	53,789	1.82	
Green	Kelley Dragoo	28,183	0.95	
Write-in		26	0.00	

=== Governor ===
2024 Missouri Republican gubernatorial primary election
Party	Candidate	Votes	%
Republican	Mike Kehoe	275,139	39.4
Republican	Bill Eigel	227,257	32.5
Republican	Jay Ashcroft	162,314	23.2
Republican	Amber Thomsen	10,653	1.5
Republican	Chris Wright	9,376	1.3
Republican	Darrell McClanahan	5,656	0.8
Republican	Robert Olson	2,985	0.4
Republican	Jeremy Gundel	2,951	0.4
Republican	Darren Grant	1,871	0.3
Total votes		698,202	100.0

2024 Missouri gubernatorial election
Party	Candidate	Votes	%	±%
Republican	Mike Kehoe	1,750,802	59.14%	▲2.03%
Democratic	Crystal Quade	1,146,173	38.72%	▼1.97%
Libertarian	Bill Slantz	40,908	1.38%	▼0.25%
Green	Paul Lehmann	22,359	0.76%	▲0.19%
Write-in		24	0.00%	Steady
Total votes		2,960,266	100.00%	N/A
Republican hold				

Missouri Senate
Preceded by Ron Richard	Majority Leader of the Missouri Senate; 2015–2018	Succeeded by Caleb Rowden
Political offices
Preceded by Mike Parson	Lieutenant Governor of Missouri; 2018–2025	Succeeded by David Wasinger
Preceded by Mike Parson	Governor of Missouri; 2025–present	Incumbent
Party political offices
Preceded by Mike Parson	Republican nominee for Lieutenant Governor of Missouri; 2020	Succeeded by David Wasinger
Preceded by Mike Parson	Republican nominee for Governor of Missouri; 2024	Most recent
U.S. order of precedence (ceremonial)
Preceded by JD Vance as Vice President	Order of precedence of the United States; Within Missouri	Succeeded by Mayor of city in which event is held
Preceded by JD Vance as Vice President	Order of precedence of the United States; Within Missouri	Succeeded by Otherwise Mike Johnson as Speaker of the United States House of Representatives
Preceded by Janet Mills as Governor of Maine	Order of precedence of the United States; Outside Missouri	Succeeded by Sarah Huckabee Sanders as Governor of Arkansas
