= Bob Dixon (Missouri politician) =

American Republican politician

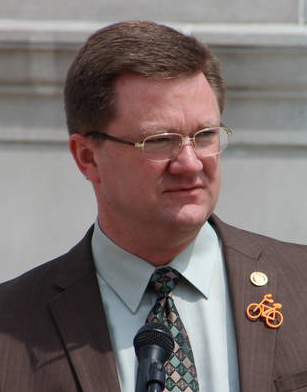

Presiding Commissioner of Greene County
- Incumbent
- Assumed office January 3, 2019
- Preceded by: Bob Cirtin

Member of the Missouri Senate from the 30th district
- In office January 5, 2011 – December 31, 2018
- Preceded by: Norma Champion
- Succeeded by: Lincoln Hough

Member of the Missouri House of Representatives from the 140th district
- In office January 8, 2003 – January 5, 2011
- Preceded by: Charlie Ballard
- Succeeded by: Lincoln Hough

Personal details
- Born: May 27, 1969 (age 57)
- Party: Republican
- Spouse: Amanda Dixon
- Education: Drury University (BS, MEd)

Bob Dixon (born May 27, 1969) is an American Republican politician currently serving as Presiding Commissioner of Greene County, Missouri. He formerly served in the Missouri House of Representatives and Missouri State Senate.

A resident of Springfield, Missouri, Dixon was first elected to the House in 2002 and served four terms. Between 2004 and 2008 he served as Majority Caucus Chairman and chaired the House Transportation Committee.

== Academic background ==
Dixon has a Master of Education degree in Human Services and a Bachelor of Science degree in Business Administration, both from Drury University. Dixon graduated high school from the Christian Schools of Springfield. He is a member of the Alpha Xi Chapter of Alpha Sigma Lambda National Honor Society.

== Personal life ==
Dixon lived as a homosexual for five years as a teenager, attributing his sexual orientation to abuse he endured as a child. In his early 20s, he renounced homosexuality and declared himself heterosexual. He is currently married and he and his wife, Amanda, have three daughters: Grace, Rose, and Olivia. They live in Springfield, Missouri where they are regular members of a local church.

Dixon is a licensed realtor, and he also teaches online classes at Drury University.

== Organization memberships ==
Dixon is member to the Rogersville, Springfield, and Strafford chambers of commerce, as well as the Missouri Farm Bureau, the James River Basin Partnership, the North Springfield Betterment Association, the Kiwanis Club of Springfield North, and the American Legislative Exchange Council (ALEC).

Dixon serves on the board of trustees of the History Museum for Springfield-Greene County, the board of Directors of the Girl Scouts of Dogwood Trails Council, Inc. and the Board of Associates of New Covenant Academy. Dixon and his wife also serve on the Association of Evangel University Family and Friends Executive Council. (edited)

== Political career ==
Dixon is a conservative and is part of the Republican Party. He most recently won the election for the Greene County Presiding Commissioner in 2018.

== Committee and task force service ==
Dixon is serving or has served on the following House committees:

- National Conference of State Legislatures
- Standing Committee on Economic Development
- Trade and Cultural Affairs
- Criminal Justice Task Force
- Internet Cyber Crime Task force

== Electoral history ==
Dixon briefly entered the 2016 gubernatorial election, announcing his bid in July 2015 and then dropping out of the race four months later.

Date	Position	Status	Opponent	Result	Vote share	Top-opponent vote share
2002	State Representative	Open-seat	Christiaan Horton (D)	Elected	64.00%	36.00%
2004	State Representative	Incumbent	Ran unopposed	Re-elected	100.00%	0%
2006	State Representative	Incumbent	Tonya Cunningham (D), Bill Boone (L)	Re-elected	63.25%	33.94% (Cunningham)
2008	State Representative	Incumbent	Ran unopposed	Re-elected	100.00%	0%
2010	State Senator	Open-seat	Michael Hoeman (D)	Elected	64.85%	35.15%
2014	State Senator	Incumbent	Ran unopposed	Re-elected	100.00%	0%
2018	Greene County Presiding Commissioner	Open-seat	Sara Lampe (D)	Elected	58.93%	41.07%
