= 2020 Missouri lieutenant gubernatorial election =

- November 3, 2020
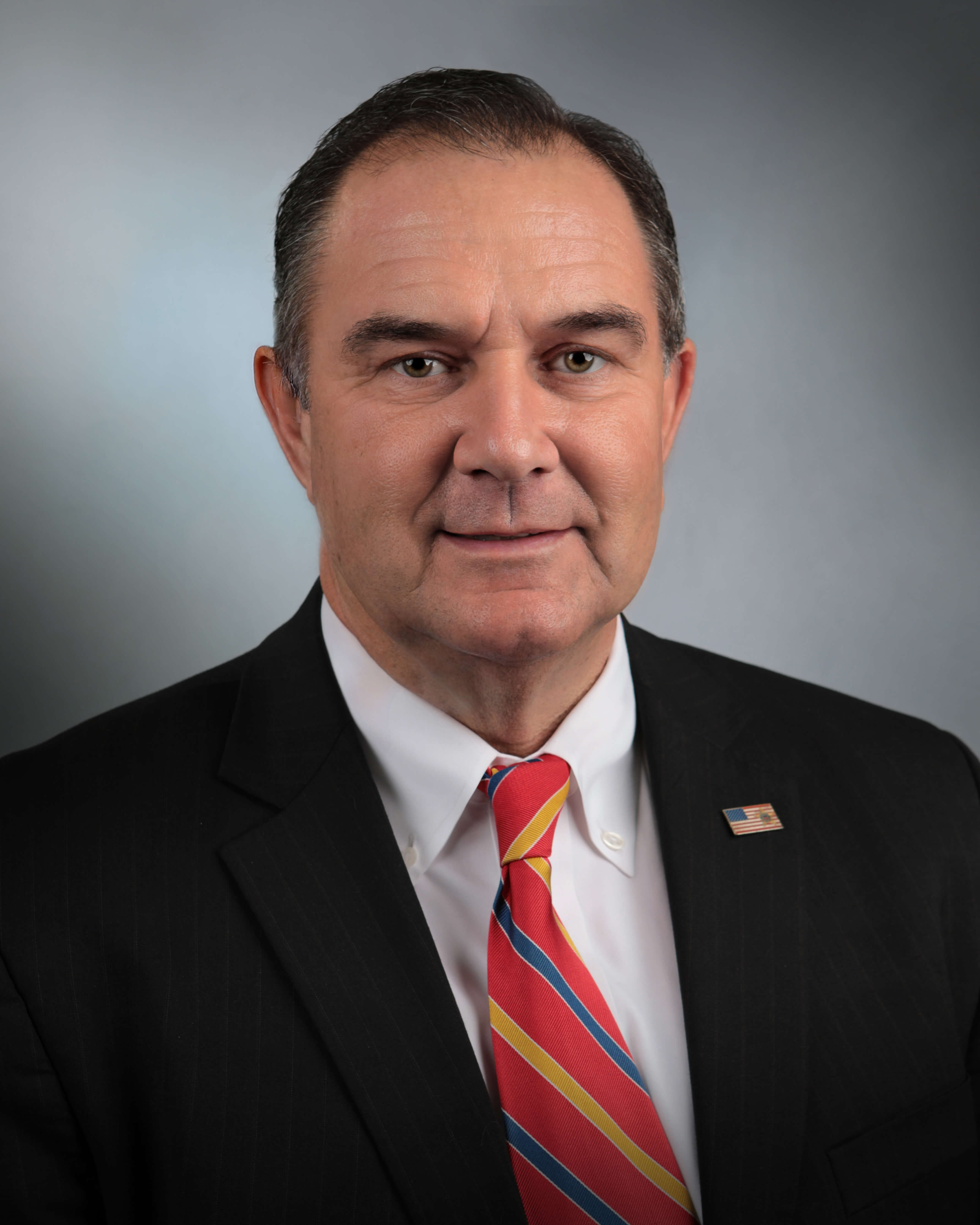

Nominee	Mike Kehoe	Alissia Canady
Party	Republican	Democratic
Popular vote	1,730,805	1,150,104
Percentage	58.41%	38.81%
- Kehoe: 40–50% 50–60% 60–70% 70–80% 80–90% >90% Canady: 40–50% 50–60% 60–70% 70–80% 80–90% >90% Tie: 40–50% 50% No data
Lieutenant Governor before election
Mike Kehoe
Republican
Elected Lieutenant Governor
Mike Kehoe
Republican

The 2020 Missouri lieutenant gubernatorial election was a general election occurring on November 3, 2020, in which the incumbent Republican, Mike Kehoe, defeated his challenger, Democrat Alissia Canady. Kehoe was originally appointed to the position in 2018, making the election his first time elected as Missouri's lieutenant governor, despite the fact that he was already in office at the time of the election.

== Republican primary ==
=== Candidates ===
==== Declared ====
- Mike Carter, St. Charles County municipal judge
- Arnie Dienoff, legal consultant
- Mike Kehoe, incumbent lieutenant governor of Missouri
- Aaron Wisdom

=== Results ===
Republican primary results
Party	Candidate	Votes	%
Republican	Mike Kehoe (incumbent)	362,442	59.41%
Republican	Mike Carter	158,914	26.05%
Republican	Aaron Wisdom	52,810	8.66%
Republican	Arnie Dienoff	35,929	5.89%
Total votes		610,095	100.0%

== Democratic primary ==
=== Candidates ===
==== Declared ====
- Alissia Canady, former Kansas City councilwoman and former Jackson County assistant prosecutor
- Gregory Upchurch, small business owner

=== Results ===
Democratic primary results
Party	Candidate	Votes	%
Democratic	Alissia Canady	371,802	73.54%
Democratic	Gregory Upchurch	133,751	26.46%
Total votes		505,553	100.0%

== Third parties ==
=== Libertarian Party ===
==== Candidates ====
===== Declared =====
- Bill Slantz, businessman

==== Results ====
Libertarian primary results
Party	Candidate	Votes	%
Libertarian	Bill Slantz	4,103	100.0%
Total votes		4,103	100.0%

=== Green Party ===
==== Candidates ====
===== Declared =====
- Kelley Dragoo

==== Results ====
Green primary results
Party	Candidate	Votes	%
Green	Kelley Dragoo	860	100.0%
Total votes		860	100.0%

== General election ==
=== Polling ===
Poll source	Date(s) administered	Sample size (Note: Key: A – all adults RV – registered voters LV – likely voters V – unclear)	Margin of error	Mike Kehoe (R)	Alissia Canady (D)	Undecided
Remington Research Group/Missouri Scout	August 12–13, 2020	1112 (LV)	± 3.0%	48%	39%	13%

=== Results ===
2020 Missouri lieutenant gubernatorial election
Party	Candidate	Votes	%	±%
Republican	Mike Kehoe (incumbent)	1,731,263	58.41%	+5.61%
Democratic	Alissia Canady	1,150,231	38.81%	−3.48%
Libertarian	Bill Slantz	53,789	1.82%	−0.68%
Green	Kelley Dragoo	28,183	0.95%	−1.46%
Write-in	Jeremy Gundel	26	0.00%	N/A
Total votes		2,963,492	100.0%	
Republican hold				

==== By congressional district ====
Kehoe won six of eight congressional districts.

District	Kehoe	Canady	Representative
1st	20%	78%	Lacy Clay (116th Congress)
1st	20%	78%	Cori Bush (117th Congress)
2nd	54%	44%	Ann Wagner
3rd	69%	29%	Blaine Luetkemeyer
4th	68%	29%	Vicky Hartzler
5th	40%	57%	Emanuel Cleaver
6th	65%	33%	Sam Graves
7th	71%	26%	Billy Long
8th	77%	21%	Jason Smith

== See also ==
- 2020 Missouri gubernatorial election
