= Lincoln Hough =

American politician

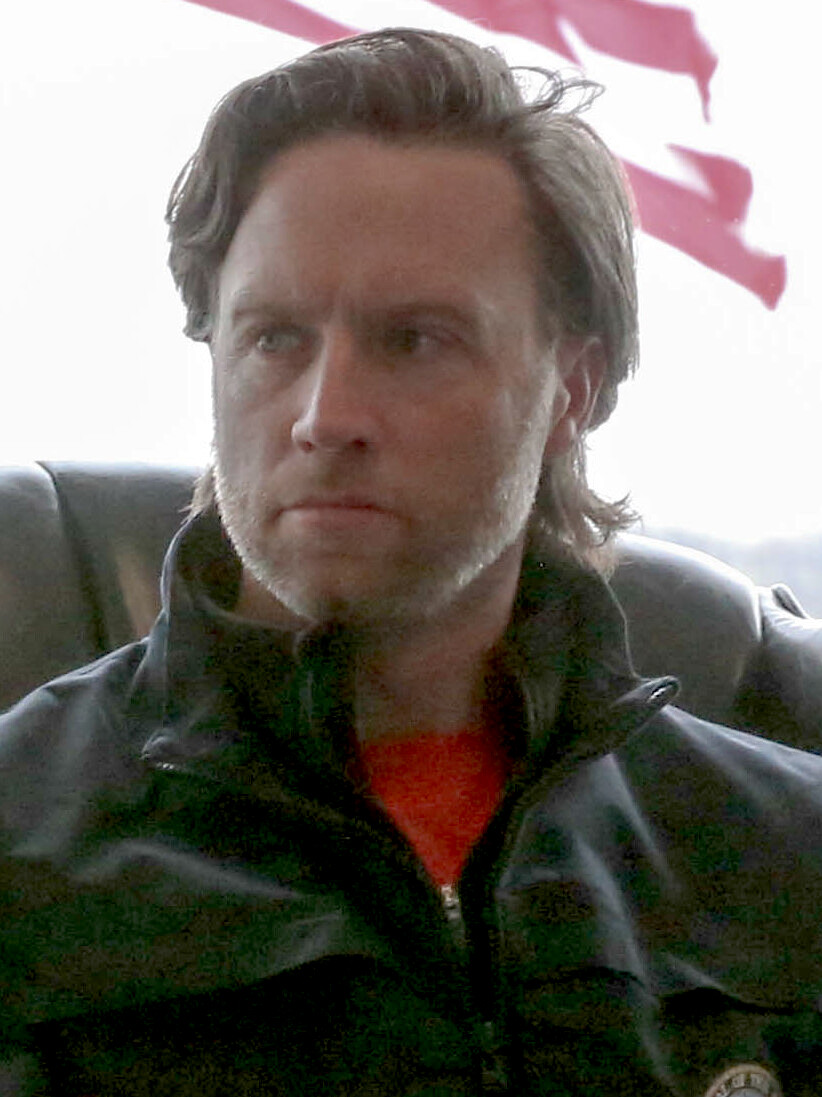

Member of the Missouri Senate from the 30th district
- Incumbent
- Assumed office January 9, 2019
- Preceded by: Bob Dixon

Member of the Missouri House of Representatives from the 135th district
- In office January 5, 2011 – January 4, 2017
- Preceded by: Bob Dixon
- Succeeded by: Steve Helms

Personal details
- Born: June 17, 1982 (age 44) Springfield, Missouri, U.S.
- Party: Republican
- Spouse: Sarah (2009–2020)
- Children: 2
- Education: Missouri State University (BA)

Lincoln Hough (/ˈlɪŋkən hʌf/; born June 17, 1982) is an American politician. He was first elected to the Missouri House of Representatives in 2010, where he served three terms. He served as Greene County Commissioner from 2016 to 2018. In November 2018, he was elected to represent the 30th District, including the city of Springfield, in the Missouri Senate.

== Early life and education ==
Hough is a first generation rancher. In 7th grade, he began raising cattle on his family's 40 acres after buying three heifers with a loan from his parents. He went on to work for a neighbor's dairy farm and learned skills to expand his own operations.

Hough graduated from Missouri State University with a Bachelor’s Degree in Political Science. He has volunteered for the Greene County and Missouri Cattlemen's Association and currently serves on the Greene County Farm Bureau Board of Directors.

== Political career ==
In the Missouri Senate, Hough sponsored the 2022 tax cut and pushed to expand infrastructure spending in Parson's plan to expand I-64. He has opposed hardline conservative members, the "Freedom Caucus," in senate proceedings. In 2021, Hough voted to fund voter-approved Medicaid expansion. As appropriations committee chair, Hough set reimbursements for Planned Parenthood to $0 in the 2024 state budget, a move the state supreme court ruled unconstitutional.

Hough was a candidate in the 2024 Missouri lieutenant gubernatorial election. His campaign received a total of $120,000 in a single day from PACs managed by former Missouri politician Steven Tilley, and he received endorsement from Kit Bond. He lost in the Republican primary.

== Personal life ==
Hough has two sons.

== Electoral history ==
=== State representative ===
Missouri House of Representatives Primary Election, August 3, 2010, District 140
Party	Candidate	Votes	%	±%
Republican	Lincoln Hough	2,734	50.74%	
Republican	Bob Cirtin	2,654	49.26%	
Total votes		5,388	100	

Missouri House of Representatives Election, November 2, 2010, District 140
Party	Candidate	Votes	%	±%
Republican	Lincoln Hough	9,030	70.68%	−29.32
Democratic	Dan Boyts	3,313	25.93%	+25.93
Libertarian	Teddy Fleck	433	3.39%	+3.39
Total votes		12,776	100	

Missouri House of Representatives Election, November 6, 2012, District 135
Party	Candidate	Votes	%	±%
Republican	Lincoln Hough	8,932	54.99%	−15.69
Democratic	Casey Clark	7,310	45.01%	+19.08
Total votes		16,242	100	

Missouri House of Representatives Election, November 4, 2014, District 135
Party	Candidate	Votes	%	±%
Republican	Lincoln Hough	4,698	57.92%	+2.93
Democratic	Angie Filbeck	3,413	42.08%	−2.93
Total votes		8,111	100	

=== Greene County Commission ===
Greene County Commission District 2, November 8, 2016
Party	Candidate	Votes	%	±%
Republican	Lincoln Hough	47,657	77.67%	
Libertarian	Cecil Ince	13,261	21.61%	
Write-In		443	0.72%	
Total votes		61,361	100	

=== State Senate ===
Missouri Senate Election, November 6, 2018, District 30
Party	Candidate	Votes	%	±%
Republican	Lincoln Hough	34,987	53.27%	−46.73
Democratic	Charlie Norr	30,690	46.73%	+46.73
Total votes		65,677	100.00%	

Missouri Senate Primary Election, August 2, 2022, District 30
Party	Candidate	Votes	%	±%
Republican	Lincoln Hough	8,771	56.62%	
Republican	Angela Romine	6,721	43.38%	
Total votes		15,492	100.00%	

Missouri Senate Election, November 8, 2022, District 30
Party	Candidate	Votes	%	±%
Republican	Lincoln Hough	30,483	57.57%	+4.30
Democratic	Raymond Lampert	22,464	42.43%	−4.30
Total votes		52,947	100.00%	
