= Roseann Bentley =

American politician (1936–2025)

Member of the Missouri Senate from the 30th district
- In office January 4, 1995 – January 8, 2003
- Preceded by: Dennis W. Smith
- Succeeded by: Norma Champion

Personal details
- Born: April 22, 1936 Springfield, Missouri, U.S.
- Died: July 14, 2025 (aged 89)
- Party: Republican

Roseann Bentley (April 22, 1936 – July 14, 2025) was an American politician who served in the Missouri Senate from the 30th district from 1995 to 2003. She was elected to the Greene County Commission in 2004, where she served for 12 years.

Bentley died at age 89, on July 14, 2025.
