= Jake Wood (veteran) =

American businessman and author

Jacob Wood
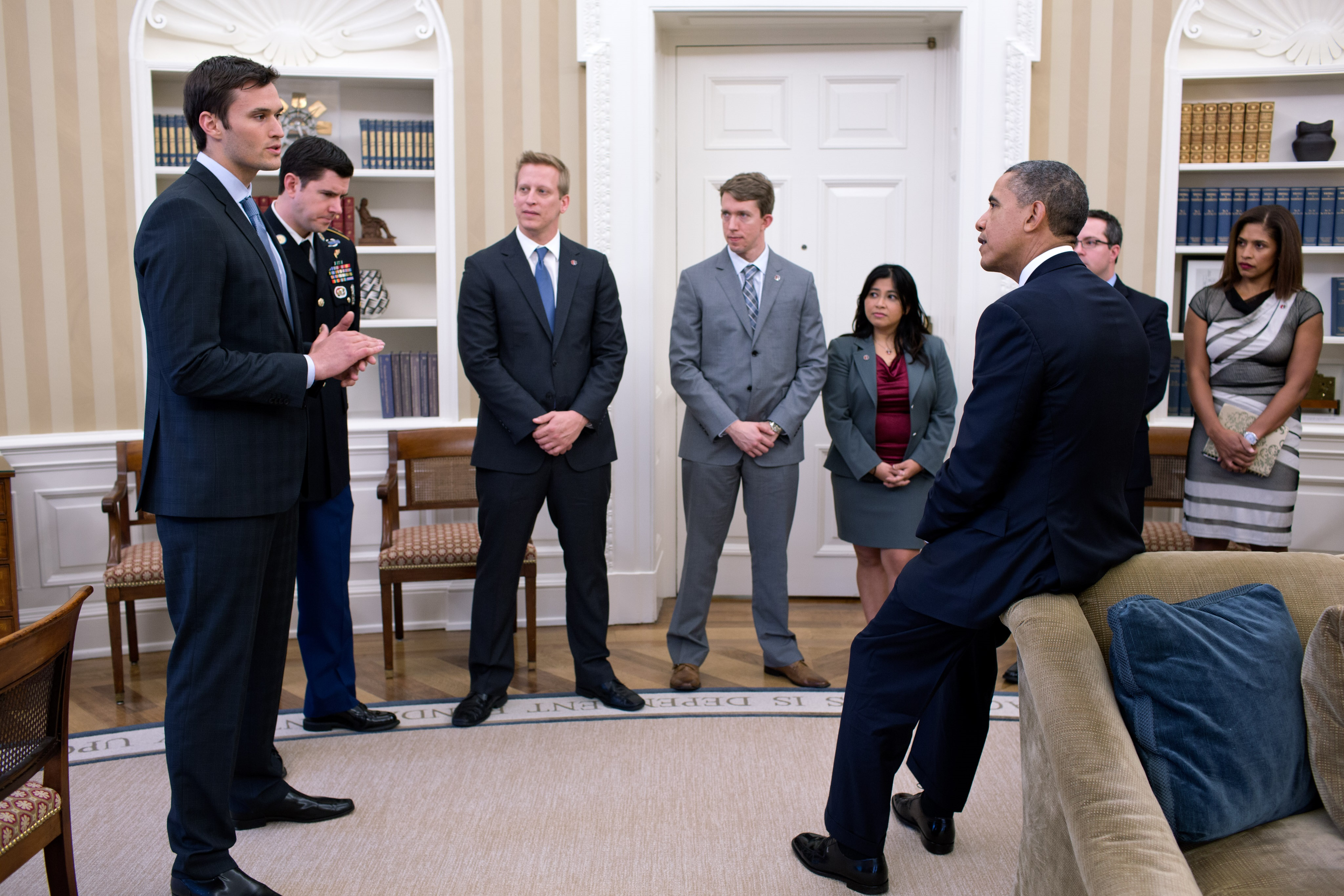
- Wood (left) and members of Team Rubicon meet President Barack Obama in the Oval Office in 2013.
- Education: University of Wisconsin
- Occupation: Social entrepreneur
- Known for: Co-founding Team Rubicon
- Works: Take Command: Lessons in Leadership: How to Be a First Responder in Business; Once a Warrior: How One Veteran Found a New Mission Closer to Home
- Awards: Pat Tillman Award for Courage ESPY; Big Ten Dungy-Thompson Humanitarian Award

Jake Wood is an American military veteran and social entrepreneur. He is the co-founder of Team Rubicon and is the recipient of the 2018 ESPY Pat Tillman Award for Service. He is the author of the books, Take Command: Lessons in Leadership: How to Be a First Responder in Business and Once A Warrior: How One Veteran Found A New Mission Closer To Home. He is also the founder and CEO of Groundswell, a corporate philanthropy platform.

== Early life ==
Wood was born in Bettendorf, Iowa, and played football for Pleasant Valley High School. He then played as an offensive linemen for the Wisconsin Badgers, though had his career hampered by shoulder injuries. In 2004, he graduated with a double major in real estate/urban land economics and political science from the University of Wisconsin.

He is a fan of the Green Bay Packers.

== Military career ==
Following graduation, Wood joined the Marines, and was sent overseas during the Iraq War in 2007 after his promotion to a lance corporal, and helped lead a squad of twelve infantrymen in al Anbar Province. During his tour he wrote about his experiences in a blog, which brought him to the attention of local news. Wood was deployed as a sniper to Afghanistan in 2008, and was promoted to the rank of sergeant before his honorable discharge in 2009. During his career he was awarded Navy-Marine Commendation Medal with valor distinguishing device for actions taken in combat. He then began advocacy work for military veterans.

== Business career ==
In 2010, Wood co-founded Team Rubicon with William McNulty and two Milwaukee firefighters. They traveled to Haiti following the 2010 earthquake to help in the rescue and recovery efforts. Between 2010 and 2018, the organization has been part of the response team for about 300 natural disasters. For his work with the organization, he received the Pat Tillman Award for Courage at the ESPYs in 2018. That year he was also awarded the Dungy-Thompson Humanitarian Award from the Big Ten Conference. In 2015, he received the 20th Annual Heinz Award in the Human Condition with William McNulty.

In 2021, Wood co-founded Groundswell, a corporate philanthropy platform that turns donor-advised funds (DAFs) into an employee benefit and raised $15 million in venture funding.

== Gaza Humanitarian Foundation ==
Wood was the executive director of the Gaza Humanitarian Foundation (GHF), founded in 2025, until he resigned on May 25, 2025, following questions raised about its independence and its connections to Israel. He noted that the organization could not fulfil its mission in a way that adhered to “humanitarian principles”.

== Books ==
In 2014 Wood authored the book Take Command: Lessons in Leadership: How to Be a First Responder in Business, which outlines decision-making as being composed of four steps: prepare, analyze, decide, and act. Publishers Weekly reviewed the book stating that, “All lessons are illustrated with high-testosterone stories from the front lines of war and disaster zones, and each chapter ends with top-level advice (“mission briefs”),” writing further that the work added, “a new twist on accepted leadership wisdom.”

He, along with former governor of Missouri Eric Greitens, is also the subject of the book Charlie Mike by Joe Klein.

In 2020, he published the memoir Once a Warrior, which outlines what American veterans are capable of and how he developed Team Rubicon.
