= Team Rubicon =

Disaster response organization

- Team Rubicon
- Abbreviation: TR
- Formation: January 12, 2010; 16 years ago
- Founder: William McNulty; Jacob "Jake" Wood
- Founded at: El Segundo, California U.S.
- Type: Non-governmental organization
- Tax ID no.: 27-1720480
- Legal status: Charity
- Headquarters: Los Angeles, California U.S.
- Location: Worldwide
- Region served: Worldwide
- Services: Disaster relief Veteran integration
- CEO: Art delaCruz
- Employees: 172
- Volunteers: 180,000+
- Website: TeamRubiconUSA.org

Team Rubicon is an international, non-governmental organization that specializes in disaster response. They are made up of military veterans and first responders that assist communities that have been affected by disasters. They have approximately 180,000 North American volunteers and assist across the world.

== History ==
Team Rubicon was formed in January 2010 following the Haiti earthquake, when William McNulty and Jacob "Jake" Wood led a medical team into Port-au-Prince three days after the disaster. The first Team Rubicon team consisted of eight members. They gathered funds and medical supplies from friends and family, flew into the Dominican Republic, rented a truck, and headed west to Haiti. The team treated thousands of patients, traveling to camps deemed "too dangerous" by other aid organizations. They ventured outside the traditional scale of disaster response, focusing on those who would be overlooked and left untreated.

This trip was the beginning of Team Rubicon. Team Rubicon sought to solve two problems, the first one being inadequate disaster response, which is often slow to respond, has inadequate infrastructure, and is not using the best technological solutions or well-trained members. The second problem was inadequate veteran reintegration into civilian life.

In 2011 TED Talk, Jake wood team Rubicon co-founder argued that millitary veterans' training, skills, and experience make them well suited to disaster response. Giving them a purpose and potentially decreasing the high suicide rate among veterans' and their reintegration into civilian life.

The death of fellow Team Rubicon member Clay Hunt from suicide redoubled Team Rubicon's organisational mission toward veteran reintegration. The team's role in domestic disasters is both to provide humanitarian assistance and to provide veterans an opportunity to continue to serve.

The name "Rubicon" is from the phrase "crossing the Rubicon," an idiom meaning passing a point of no return. The red and gray logo is made up of a sideways cross, a traditional symbol of first aid, but on its side as a departure from the traditional, with a river running through the logo, as a symbol of the gap between disasters and disaster relief.

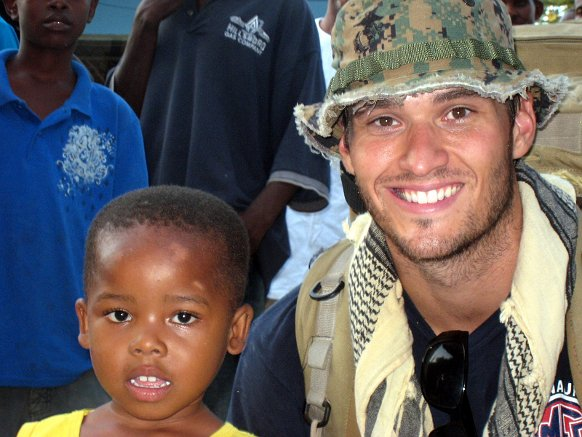
Jake Wood in Haiti in 2010 on first Team Rubicon operation

Wood and his work with Team Rubicon were profiled alongside fellow vet Eric Greitens and The Mission Continues founder as the subject of Time columnist Joe Klein's 2015 book, Charlie Mike.

J.J. Watt, a defensive end for the Houston Texans, raised $37 million towards the Hurricane Harvey relief efforts, and so consulted SBP, a disaster relief organization based in New Orleans, and Team Rubicon for how to best spend the funds.

== Scope of work ==
Since the Haiti earthquake, Team Rubicon has deployed on over 500 operations including international operations in Pakistan (2010 Pakistan floods), Chile (2010 Chile tsunami), Burma (2010 Thai-Burma border conflict), Sudan, Ecuador, Nepal, Greece, and Turkey and Hurricane Dorian in the Bahamas.

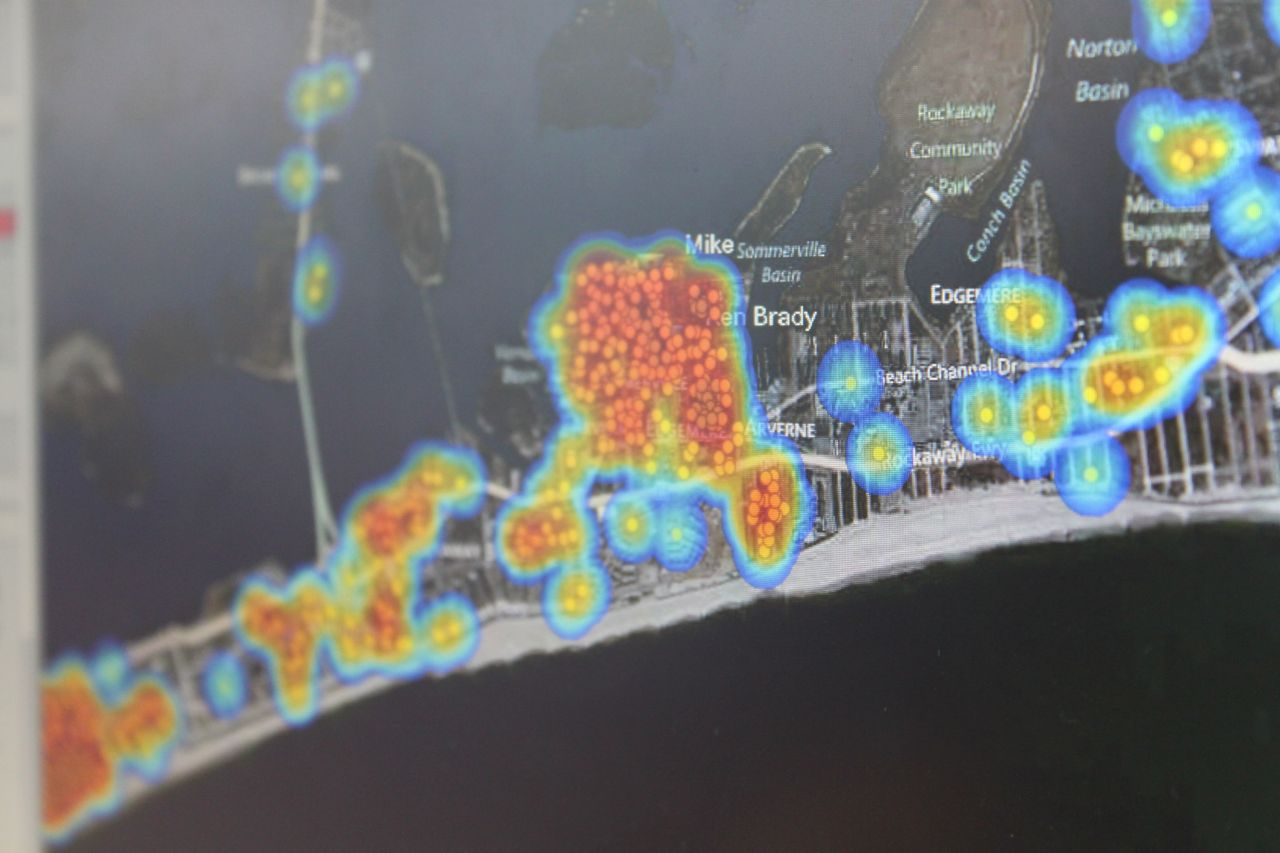
Palantir mapping screenshots during Hurricane Sandy operation on the Rockaways

Domestically, Team Rubicon has responded to large-scale disasters such as Hurricane Matthew, Hurricane Irene, Tropical Storm Debby, Hurricane Isaac, Hurricane Sandy, the tornado destruction of Moore, Oklahoma, Hurricane Maria, Hurricane Florence, and Hurricane Michael. In 2019, Team Rubicon's Operation Heartlander responded to Winter Storm Ulmer, which caused widespread damage across the American Midwest and provided assistance in eastern Nebraska, western Iowa, and on the Pine Ridge reservation in South Dakota.

Many of Team Rubicon's hundreds of responses are to more localized disasters such as catastrophic snowstorms, smaller tornadoes, and flooding.

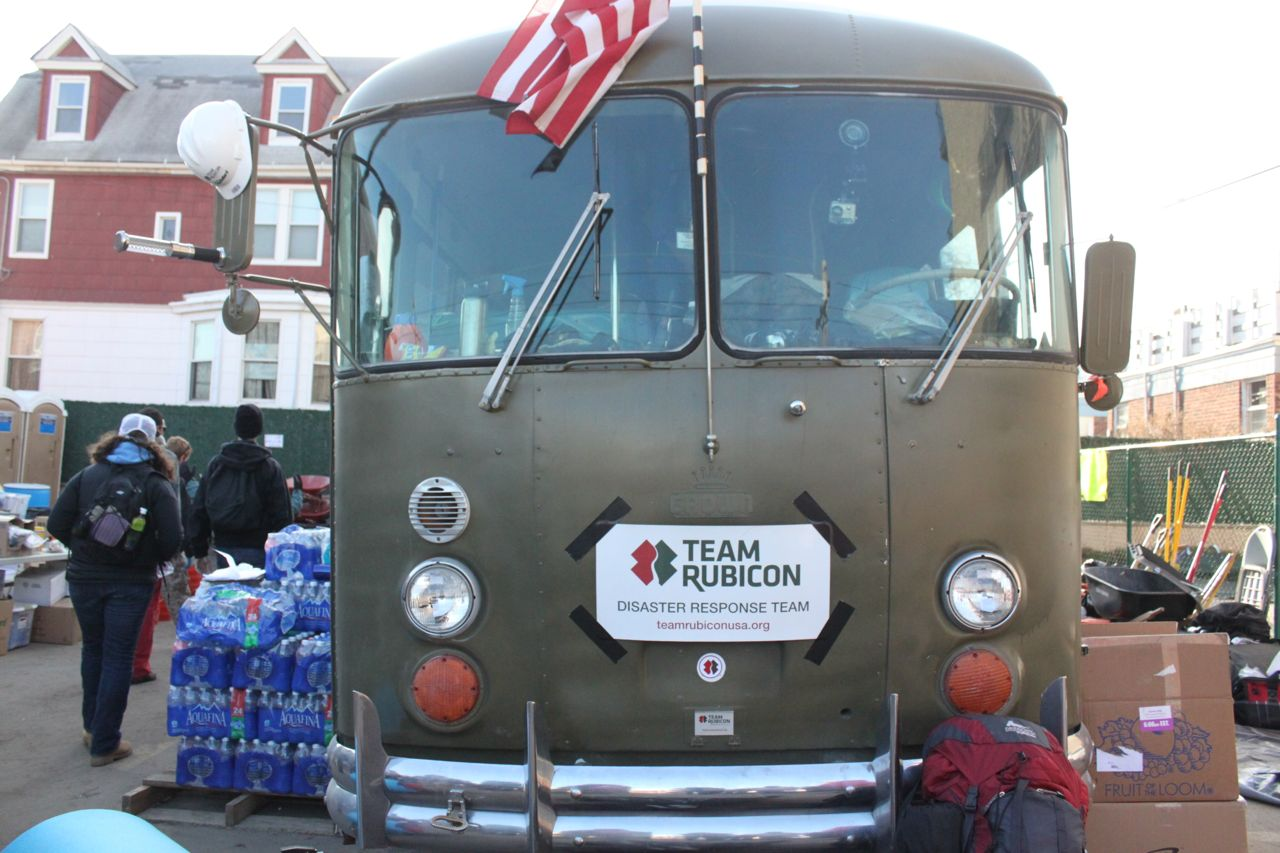
Palantir HQ on the green school bus during Hurricane Sandy operation on the Rockaways

With the onset of the COVID-19 epidemic, Team Rubicon USA expanded its operational focus to include feeding programs in conjunction with Food Lifeline and Feeding America and Meals on Wheels and to take individual initiative, called "Neighbors Helping Neighbors", to safely assist their fellow community members.

Team Rubicon also conducts wildfire mitigation operations that serve as training opportunities and a way to help protect vulnerable communities by removing potential fuels.

In 2018 Team Rubicon became the first non-governmental organization in North America to receive WHO Emergency Medical Team Type 1 Mobile certification.

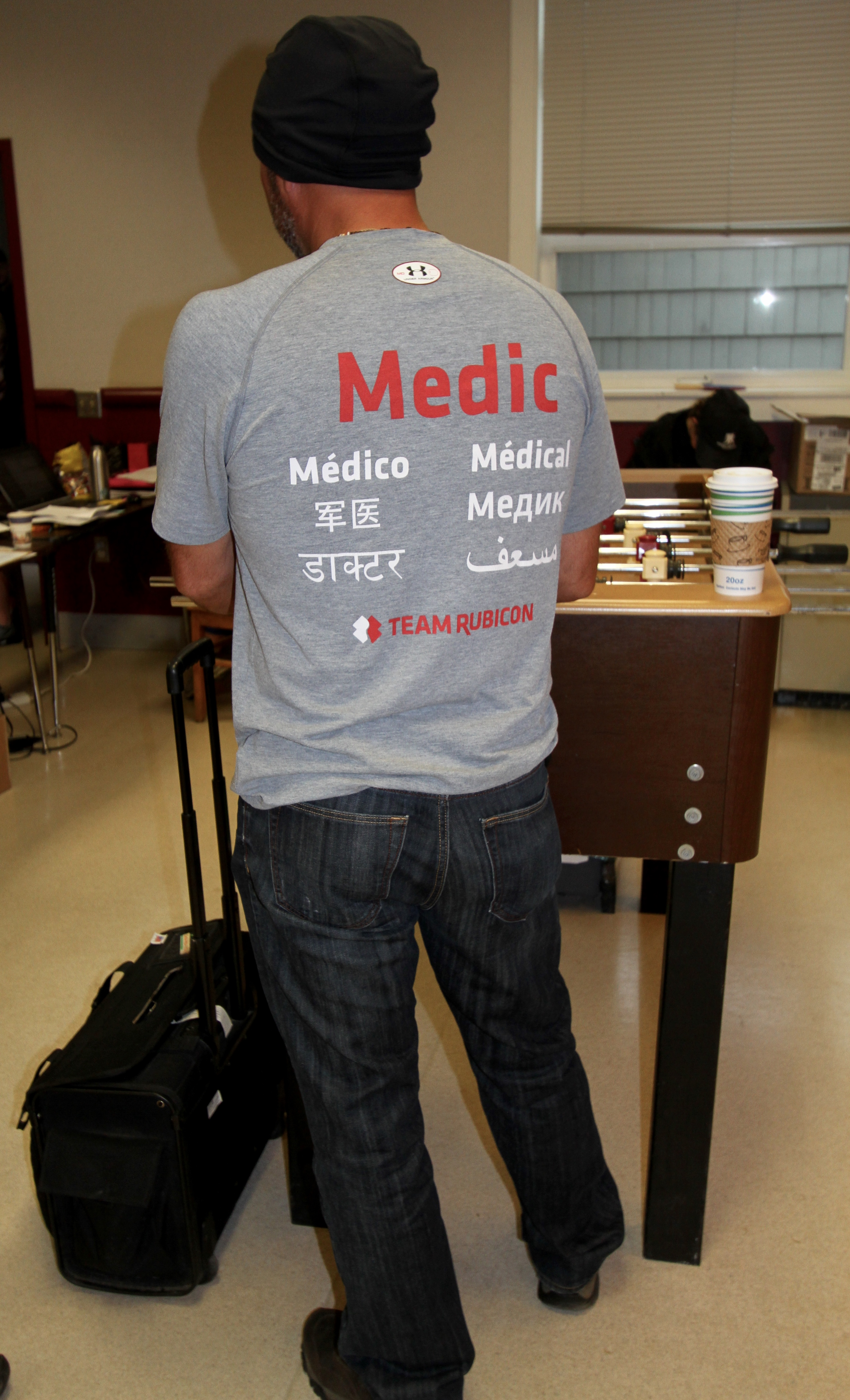
Team Rubicon Medic

In 2021 and thereafter, Team Rubicon supported Afghan refugees who came to the U.S. following the 2021 Kabul airlift.

== Leadership ==
In 2013, General (Ret.) David Petraeus joined Team Rubicon's Board of Advisors. Petraeus promoted the work of veteran reintegration, citing its importance to soldiers returning from war.

Three years later, in 2016, civil rights expert Ehsan Zaffar joined the Board of Advisors.

Additional high-profile advisors are General Stanley McChrystal, USA (Ret.) and former New York Stock Exchange CEO Duncan Niederauer, who serves on the board of directors. General James T. Conway, USMC (Ret.) and Lt Gen Russel L. Honoré, USA (Ret.) as well as private sector business people Andy Bessette from Travelers Insurance, Jeff Dailey, CEO of Farmers Group, Gregg Lemkau from Goldman Sachs, John Pitts from Kirkland & Ellis, Richard Serino, former Deputy Administrator of FEMA, and Jeff Smith from FedEx serve as advisors to Team Rubicon. Many are former military or have logistical expertise that helps guide Team Rubicon.

Additional high-profile supporters are former Presidents George W. Bush and Bill Clinton. The George W. Bush Center included Team Rubicon as one of the case studies in its research on veteran-serving nonprofits (VSNP).

In July 2021, Team Rubicon co-founder and then-current CEO Jake Wood stepped into an Executive Chairman role. Jake left the CEO position and then-current COO Art delaCruz stepped into the CEO position. "Team Rubicon Cofounder and CEO Jake Wood Steps into Executive Chairman Role and President and COO Art delaCruz Elevated to Chief Executive Officer" (Press release).

Several international chapters of Team Rubicon were detached or reorganized as independent organizations with the same mission, in some cases following the 2020 trademark dispute (see below). Team Rubicon UK ended its licence agreement with Team Rubicon, Inc. in June 2020 and rebranded as RE:ACT Disaster Response, and Team Rubicon Australia rebranded as Disaster Relief Australia in May 2020. Team Rubicon's Norway chapter became "Response Norway". Disaster Relief Australia ceased operations in 2026 after its creditors voted to wind up the organization following the withdrawal of government funding.

== Partnerships ==
Team Rubicon is or has partnered with many US corporations to support its mission including (list is not complete):

- Got Your 6
- Palantir Technologies, in 2013, under Bill Clinton
- Home Depot
- Tough Mudder
- Jack Links
- Pepsi and Mountain Dew
- Carhartt
- Merrell
- The Guardian Life Insurance Company

== Clay Hunt Fellow's Program ==
The Clay Hunt Fellow's Program is a leadership development fellowship created by Team Rubicon. It is named after Clay Hunt, one of the original members of Team Rubicon who suffered from PTSD and depression and died by suicide in 2011. It was founded in 2013 as a 12-month program, but has since been changed to a 6-month program. On February 12, 2015, a veteran suicide prevention bill, the Clay Hunt Suicide Prevention for American Veterans Act or the Clay Hunt SAV "Suicide Prevention for American Veterans" Act, named in his honor, became law.

== Television show ==
In 2023, a Team Rubicon show aired on The Roku Channel, hosted by Kevin O'Connor in 2023.

== Dispute with Team Rubicon Global ==
Team Rubicon's international expansion was handled through a separate entity, Team Rubicon Global (TRG), formed in 2014 to license the Team Rubicon name and model to affiliates in countries including Canada, the United Kingdom, Australia, and Norway. The structure, and whether overseas affiliates should operate under American leadership, was a recurring source of tension within the organization.

In August 2019, allegations of sexual harassment were raised against the chief executives of the UK and Australia affiliates following Team Rubicon's annual leadership conference in Estes Park, Colorado. A volunteer with the Canadian affiliate stated that the two men had directed inappropriate sexual conduct and remarks at her during the event. Both men denied wrongdoing or disputed that the conduct amounted to harassment; internal reviews conducted by trustees in the UK and Australia did not conclude that sexual harassment had occurred, though the UK review found that a staff member had been verbally abusive while under the influence of alcohol.

After investigating the complaint, Team Rubicon (the US organization) asked TRG to take corrective action, including dismissing the two executives, and, after concluding TRG had not complied, terminated the trademark licensing agreement permitting TRG and its affiliates to use the Team Rubicon name and logo. TRG sued in the U.S. District Court for the Southern District of New York in March 2020, arguing that the affiliates were legally independent organizations and that it lacked the authority to fire the executives under the relevant countries' employment laws. Team Rubicon counter claimed for trademark infringement and breach of contract.

In May 2020, Judge Laura Taylor Swain granted Team Rubicon's request for a preliminary injunction barring TRG from using the trademarks and denied TRG's competing motion, finding that Team Rubicon was likely to succeed on the merits and that TRG had materially breached the licensing agreement. The U.S. Court of Appeals for the Second Circuit subsequently upheld the injunction.

== Awards and honors ==
- 2011: GQ Foundation, Winner, Better Men Better World, Jake Wood
- 2012: CNN Hero, Jake Wood
- 2012: Classy Awards, National Small Charity of the Year
- 2012: Grinnell Prize
- 2012: Chase American Giving Awards, "Heroes and Leaders" National Award
- 2015: Presidential Leadership Scholar, William McNulty
- 2018: Pat Tillman Award for Courage at the ESPYs, Jake Wood
- 2018: Dungy-Thompson Humanitarian Award from the Big Ten Conference, Jake Wood

== See also ==
- Veterans of Foreign Wars
- The American Legion
- The Mission Continues
