= T. J. McKenna =

American politician

TJ McKenna

Member of the Missouri House of Representatives from the 114th district
- In office 2013–2015
- Preceded by: Jay Barnes (redistricting)
- Succeeded by: Becky Ruth

Personal details
- Born: July 2, 1985 (age 41) St. Louis, Missouri
- Party: Democratic
- Education: University of Missouri

TJ McKenna is a former Democratic member of the Missouri House of Representatives, serving from 2013 to 2015. He represented part of Jefferson County, including the cities of Festus and Crystal City. In 2013, McKenna voted for a bill that attempted to nullify federal gun control laws.
