= Sheena Chestnut Greitens =

American political scientist

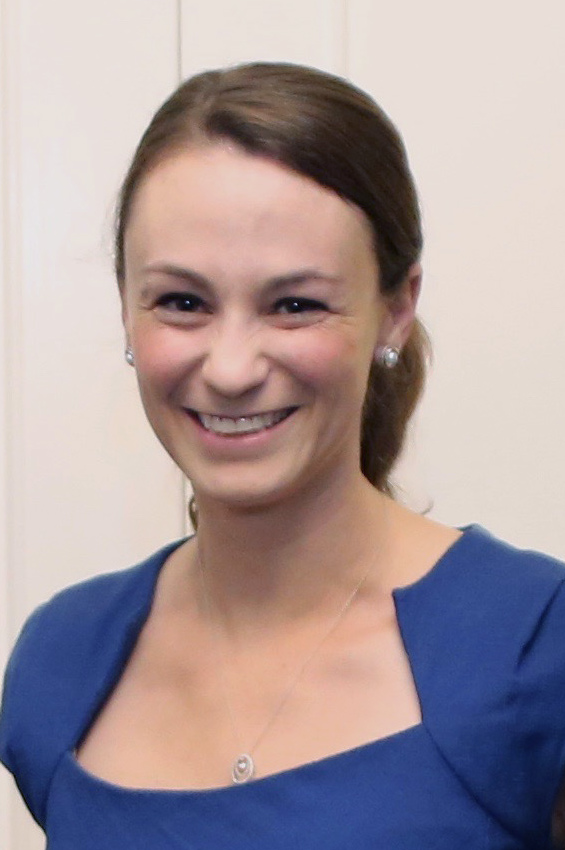

First Lady of Missouri
- In role January 9, 2017 – June 1, 2018
- Governor: Eric Greitens
- Preceded by: Georganne Wheeler
- Succeeded by: Teresa Parson

Personal details
- Born: Sheena Elise Chestnut; November 23, 1982 (age 43)
- Spouse: Eric Greitens (m. 2011; div. 2020)
- Children: 2
- Education: Stanford University (BA); St Antony's College, Oxford (MPhil); Harvard University (PhD)

Academic work
- Discipline: Political science
- Sub-discipline: National security studies Asian studies
- Institutions: University of Texas, Austin

Sheena Elise Chestnut Greitens (born November 23, 1982) is an American political scientist. She is an associate professor at the Lyndon B. Johnson School of Public Affairs at the University of Texas at Austin. She was First Lady of Missouri from 2017 to 2018.

== Education ==
Greitens was raised in Spokane, Washington. Her father is a doctor who specializes in the treatment of sleep disorders and her mother is an oncologist. She earned a Bachelor of Arts degree from Stanford University, a Master of Philosophy from St Antony's College, Oxford, as a Marshall Scholar, and a Ph.D. from Harvard University.

== Career ==
Greitens' research focuses primarily on East Asia, U.S. national security, authoritarian politics and foreign policy. She was a Jeane Kirkpatrick Visiting Fellow at the American Enterprise Institute and was a Nonresident Senior Fellow at the Brookings Institution's Center for East Asia Policy Studies from 2016 to 2021. She was previously Assistant Professor of Political Science at University of Missouri from 2015-2020 and co-director of the Institute of Korean Studies, 2017-2020.

Greitens has written about foreign relations and national security for RealClearPolitics, Foreign Policy, War on the Rocks, Foreign Affairs, The National Interest, The Washington Post, The New York Times, and others.

She is a participant of the Task Force on U.S.-China Policy convened by the Asia Society's Center on US-China Relations. In August 2024, Greitens was announced as the Texas National Security Review's editor-in-chief.

== Publications ==
=== Articles ===
- Playing Both Sides of the U.S.-Chinese Rivalry, Foreign Affairs, March 15, 2024 (co-authored with Isaac Kardon)
- How North Korean defectors shape the policies of countries where they settle, NK News, February 13, 2024
- Xi’s Security Obsession, Foreign Affairs, July 28, 2023
- Xi Jinping’s Quest for Order, Foreign Affairs, October 3, 2022
- China’s Troubling Vision for the Future of Public Health, Foreign Affairs, July 10, 2020 (co-authored with Julian Gewirtz)

== Personal life ==
From 2011 to 2020, she was married to former Missouri Governor Eric Greitens. They have two children, of whom she has primary custody.
