= Becky Ruth =

American politician (born 1964)

Member of the Missouri House of Representatives from the 114th district
- In office January 7, 2015 – November 30, 2021
- Preceded by: T. J. McKenna
- Succeeded by: Ken Waller

Personal details
- Born: September 27, 1964 (age 61) Festus, Missouri, U.S.
- Party: Republican

Becky Ruth (born September 27, 1964) is an American politician who served in the Missouri House of Representatives from the 114th district from 2015 to 2021.
