= The Mission Continues =

American nonprofit organization

- Founded: August 2007; 18 years ago
- Type: Veteran Service Organization, Nonprofit
- Headquarters: St. Louis, MO, United States
- Location: St. Louis, Missouri
- Region served: United States and Puerto Rico
- Method: Professional Development, Leadership Development
- President: Mary Beth Bruggeman
- Chief Strategy Officer: Susan Thaxton
- Chief Marketing and Development Officer: James Gillen
- Chief People Officer: La Costa Moore
- Board of directors: Len Kortakaas
- Website: www.missioncontinues.org

The Mission Continues is an American 501(c)(3) national nonprofit organization that aims to empower military veterans to apply their skills and leadership abilities to benefit under-resourced communities. Established with the recognition that veterans possess a unique drive and dedication to serve, the organization seeks to harness these qualities to foster community development and support. By providing veterans with the tools and opportunities to continue their service beyond the military, the organization addresses the dual challenges of veteran reintegration and community underdevelopment. They connect veterans with under-resourced communities, helping veteran volunteers collaborate with nonprofit partners.

== Programs and Initiatives ==
• Service Platoon Program

Led by volunteers who are veterans, they coordinate projects tailored to local needs. As of March 2023, service platoons are active in 40 cities. The service platoon program is in partnership with Navy Federal Credit Union.

• Annual Mass Deployment Since 2016, veterans from across the country alongside local partners volunteer in a single city for a week.

• Women Veterans Leadership Program In April 2016, The Mission Continues launched the first Women Veterans Leadership Summit and due to its success, it was pivoted towards a full-fledged program.

• Fellowship Program

Post 9/11 veterans work with a non-profit or volunteer organization for 20 hours a week for 6 months to gain experience which will assist them with finding full time employment, continued volunteer services or high education.

== Awards ==
The organization was named one of the 50 Best Nonprofits to Work For in 2012, 2013 and 2014.

== History ==
Formerly Center for Citizen Leadership, the organization was founded in 2007 by Republican politician Eric Greitens. Mary Beth Bruggeman is the current President.

On 9 July 2025, the Travis Manion Foundation (TMF) announced the acquisition of the Mission Continues.

== Political controversy ==
Eric Greitens stepped down as CEO in July 2014 to pursue political aspirations in Missouri; Greitens was accused of improperly taking The Mission Continues list of donors and his campaign was fined in 2015. On April 20, 2018, Greitens was charged with felony computer data tampering, related to the same incident. The charges were later dropped.

== See also ==
- Team Rubicon
