= Jay Barnes =

American politician

Member of the Missouri House of Representatives from the 60th district
- In office January 9, 2013 – January 9, 2019
- Preceded by: Jamilah Nasheed
- Succeeded by: Dave Griffith

Member of the Missouri House of Representatives from the 114th district
- In office January 5, 2011 – January 9, 2013
- Preceded by: Bill Deeken
- Succeeded by: T. J. McKenna

Personal details
- Born: December 27, 1979 (age 46) Jefferson City, Missouri
- Party: Republican

Jason Barnes (born December 27, 1979) is an American politician who served in the Missouri House of Representatives from 2011 to 2019.
