= Eric Greitens =

American politician and former Navy SEAL (born 1974)

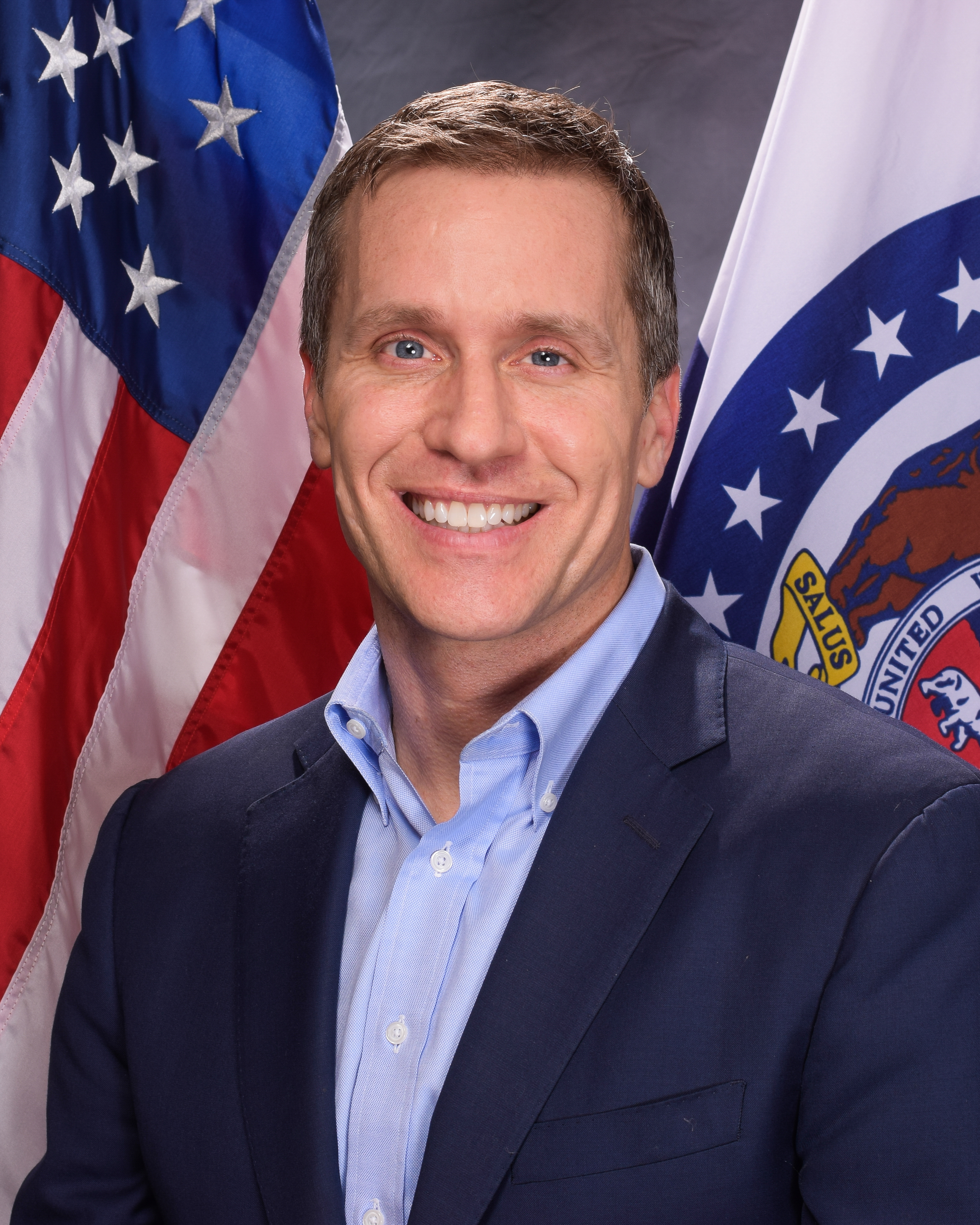
- Official portrait, 2017

56th Governor of Missouri
- In office January 9, 2017 – June 1, 2018
- Lieutenant: Mike Parson
- Preceded by: Jay Nixon
- Succeeded by: Mike Parson

Personal details
- Born: Eric Robert Greitens; April 10, 1974 (age 52) St. Louis, Missouri, U.S.
- Party: Democratic (before 2015); Republican (2015–present)
- Spouses: Rebecca Wright (m. 2000; div. 2003); Sheena Chestnut (m. 2011; div. 2020)
- Children: 2
- Education: Duke University (BA); Lady Margaret Hall, Oxford (MPhil, DPhil)
- Civilian awards: President's Volunteer Service Award (2008)

Military service
- Branch/service: United States Navy
- Years of service: 2001–2021
- Rank: Lieutenant Commander
- Unit: U.S. Navy SEALs; U.S. Navy Reserve
- Battles/wars: Iraq War; War in Afghanistan
- Military awards: Bronze Star Medal; Purple Heart; Joint Service Commendation Medal; Navy and Marine Corps Commendation Medal

Eric Robert Greitens (/ˈɡraɪtənz/ GRY-tənz; born April 10, 1974) is an American politician, humanitarian, and former United States Navy SEAL. A member of the Republican Party, he served as the 56th governor of Missouri from January 2017 until his resignation in June 2018. His resignation followed multiple investigations involving allegations related to an extramarital relationship, in which he was accused of blackmail and sexual assault, and improper campaign‑finance practices, although all the associated criminal charges were later dropped.

Born and raised in St. Louis, Greitens graduated from Duke University in 1996 and received a doctorate in 2000 from Lady Margaret Hall, Oxford, as a Rhodes scholar. For his humanitarian work, he was awarded the Gleitsman Citizen Activist Award from Harvard Kennedy School and the President's Volunteer Service Award. During his four tours of duty as a U.S. Navy SEAL officer, he rose to the rank of lieutenant commander. He commanded a unit targeting al-Qaeda, and was awarded a Bronze Star and a Purple Heart. Later, after being a White House fellow, Greitens founded a nonprofit organization, The Mission Continues, to benefit veterans. In 2013, Time included him in its list of the 100 most influential people in the world. He also taught public service at the Truman School of Public Affairs and was an adjunct professor of business ethics in the MBA program at the Olin School of Business at Washington University in St. Louis.

Greitens ran for governor of Missouri as a Republican in 2016. In the predominately Republican state, Greitens prevailed over three opponents in the Republican primary. He defeated Democratic Missouri Attorney General Chris Koster in the general election. He was Missouri's first Jewish governor. One of Greitens's signature acts in office was signing Missouri's right-to-work law, which was later repealed by statewide referendum.

In February 2018, Greitens was charged with felony invasion of privacy related to an extramarital relationship. Prosecutors alleged that he had taken an unauthorized photograph of the woman involved. The woman also made allegations that he had sexually assaulted her, which Greitens denied. A bipartisan Special Investigative Committee of the Missouri House of Representatives reviewed the matter and released a report in April 2018.

In April 2018, Greitens was separately indicted on a felony count of computer tampering. The charge concerned the alleged use of a donor list from The Mission Continues, the nonprofit organization he co-founded, for political fundraising without their permission. All criminal charges in both cases were dropped in May 2018.

Greitens resigned from the governorship on June 1, 2018, shortly after the Missouri General Assembly convened a special session to consider possible impeachment proceedings.

In 2022, Greitens attempted a return to public office, running for the U.S. Senate seat being vacated by retiring incumbent Roy Blunt in the 2022 election. He lost the Republican primary to Missouri Attorney General Eric Schmitt, who won the general election.

== Early life and education ==
Greitens was born on April 10, 1974, in St. Louis, Missouri, to Becky and Rob Greitens. Greitens's mother was a special education teacher and his father was an accountant for the Missouri Department of Agriculture. His mother is Jewish and his father is Catholic; Greitens was raised Jewish. He grew up in a Democratic family. Greitens graduated from Parkway North High School in 1992.

After high school, Greitens majored in ethics, philosophy, and public policy at Duke University. He graduated in 1996 with an A.B. summa cum laude.

Greitens won a Harry S. Truman Scholarship and was selected as a Rhodes scholar, which allowed him to pursue graduate studies at Oxford University. He studied how international humanitarian organizations assist children in war zones. He was a member of Lady Margaret Hall and received a M.Phil. in development studies in 1998 and a D.Phil. in politics, for research on humanitarian organization efforts on behalf of children in war-torn countries, in 2000.

During his 2016 campaign for governor, Greitens said, "I have worked in Cambodia with kids who lost limbs to land mines and are survivors of polio. I've worked in Bolivia with children of the street. I've worked in one of Mother Teresa's homes for the destitute and dying." For six weeks as a college student, Greitens worked at two refugee camps, the Puntizela camp outside Pula, Croatia, and the Gasinci camp outside Osijek, Croatia. Both are described in his book. Refugee camps in Croatia were temporary homes for Bosnians crossing the border. Greitens also traveled to Rwanda and Zaire as a volunteer U.N. photographer.

== U.S. Navy SEAL (2001–2021) ==
Greitens matriculated at the United States Navy's Officer Candidate School in Pensacola, Florida, in January 2001, graduating in May of that year as an ensign in the United States Navy Reserve. He began Basic Underwater Demolitions/SEAL (BUD/S) training in Coronado, California, graduating with Class 237 in February 2002.

Greitens rose to be a lieutenant commander in the United States Navy Reserve. During his active duty career, he was deployed four times, to Iraq, Afghanistan, the Horn of Africa, and Southeast Asia. He was the commander of a joint special operations task unit, a Mark V Special Operations Craft detachment, and an al-Qaeda targeting cell.

In 2005, Greitens left full-time active duty to take a one-year White House fellowship. Appointed by President George W. Bush, Greitens developed a program to get architecture and engineering students involved in rebuilding efforts in the South after Hurricane Katrina. He remained a Navy reservist and led a program that recruited advisers for special military operations around the world. As a White House fellow, he also worked in the Department of Housing and Urban Development (HUD).

After his fellowship, he volunteered for a six-month tour in Iraq that began in October 2006. On March 28, 2007, two suicide bombers detonated trucks carrying chlorine gas at the Fallujah government complex where Greitens and other military personnel were sleeping. The attack was the seventh chlorine bombing in the Al Anbar province of Iraq by Al-Qaeda. Greitens was among about 15 who were wounded, and he received a Purple Heart. He was also awarded the Bronze Star and Combat Action Ribbon.

During a deployment in Thailand, Greitens learned of drug use by Navy personnel and initiated an investigation that led to their removal. In the Philippines, his crew effectively shut down a transit site for a terrorist organization, according to an evaluation report.

In January 2019, Greitens (in the Individual Ready Reserve) sought to be reinstated to the Navy's Selected Reserve. Navy officials, including Vice Admiral Robert P. Burke (then the Chief of Naval Personnel) and Brendan McLane (then the head of the Navy Recruiting Command) did not want to give Greitens a "major misconduct waiver" that would allow him to return, due to the allegations of sexual assault against him. The SEALs told Navy leadership that "he would not meet criteria for re-entry to the SEAL community given his age and unfavorable promotion likelihood." But under pressure from Vice President Mike Pence, the Navy allowed Greitens to return, granting him a "red carpet" medical clearance.

Upon his return, however, the Special Warfare Command denied Greitens reentry into the SEALs. He was instead classified as a general unrestricted line officer, a category for reservists tasked with office duties. After spending two years as an active member of the Navy Reserve, Greitens resigned his commission in the Navy Reserve on May 1, 2021, two months after he launched his U.S. Senate campaign.

== Affiliation switch to the Republican Party ==
Greitens grew up as a Democrat. In 2015, he wrote a Fox News op-ed announcing that he had become a Republican. He said he had been raised in the tradition of Harry S. Truman and had been recruited as a Democratic candidate for Congress, but was pushed rightward after seeing the Department of Veterans Affairs fail to help many of his brothers in arms. He recalled being angered at how the Democrats' only solution was to "spend more money" on the VA. "The problem is that most Democrats seem to think more money and bigger government are the solutions to virtually every single problem", he wrote. He said he believed Democrats no longer had the right ideas to stand up for the middle class.

== 2016 Missouri gubernatorial election ==
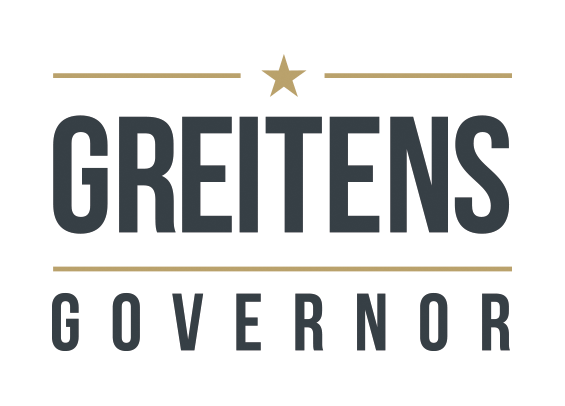
Gubernatorial election campaign logo

On September 26, 2015, Greitens announced his candidacy for governor of Missouri as a Republican. Shortly after a June 30, 2016, quarterly deadline for filing campaign contributions, he received the largest ever single contribution in a Missouri campaign, $1.975 million. The timing meant that he did not have to reveal it until October, months after the primary. The source was a previously unknown Superpac, "SEALS for Truth". SEALS for Truth had received the money from the American Policy Coalition (APC), another Superpac, on the same day APC received the entire amount. Greitens had assured voters he intended to increase transparency while reducing corruption in state politics as a campaign focus. APC, about which there was almost no information online, was headed by Ohio lawyer David Langdon, who had incorporated it in Kentucky in 2015. Between the 2010 election cycle and early 2015, at least 11 groups connected to Langdon spent at least $22 million on ballot initiatives against abortion and same-sex marriage, and on federal and state elections around the country, as tabulated by the Center for Public Integrity. On March 12, 2017, the St. Louis Post-Dispatch and The Kansas City Star editorial boards published a joint editorial criticizing Greitens for "secret fundraising and secret spending", and for tactics such as ordering that "[s]ecurity staffers block reporters from getting close to him". In 2018, Missouri Attorney General Josh Hawley, a Republican running for the U.S. Senate, announced the opening of an investigation of Greitens's 2016 campaign financing.

Greitens won the August 2 Republican primary with 236,250 votes (34.6%) to businessman John Brunner's 169,425 (24.8%), Lieutenant Governor Peter Kinder's 141,498 (20.7%), and former Speaker Catherine Hanaway's 136,350 (19.9%). Democrat-turned-Republican Greitens faced Republican-turned-Democrat Chris Koster in the general election on November 8, 2016, and won with 51.3% of the vote to Koster's 45.4%.

On April 28, 2017, the Missouri Ethics Commission fined Greitens's campaign $1,000 for violating state campaign ethics rules regarding campaign disclosure. Greitens did not contest the fine.

2016 Missouri gubernatorial election
Primary election
| Party | Candidate | Votes | % |
|---|---|---|---|
| Republican | Eric Greitens | 236,481 | 34.56 |
| Republican | John Brunner | 169,620 | 24.79 |
| Republican | Peter Kinder | 141,629 | 20.70 |
| Republican | Catherine Hanaway | 136,521 | 19.95 |
| Total votes | | 684,251 | 100.00 |
General election
| Republican | Eric Greitens | 1,424,730 | 51.3 |
| Democratic | Chris Koster | 1,261,110 | 45.4 |
| Total votes | | 2,685,840 | 100.00 |
| Republican gain from Democratic | | | |

== Governor of Missouri (2017–2018) ==
Greitens identifies himself as a conservative outsider, and is a member of the Republican Party. He called himself a "Make America Great Again" candidate, and often voiced opposition to leading Republicans such as Mitch McConnell for being insufficiently conservative. He has opposed federal matching grants for state projects, saying they "unbalance" state budgets, and voiced support for block grants instead.

=== Cabinet ===
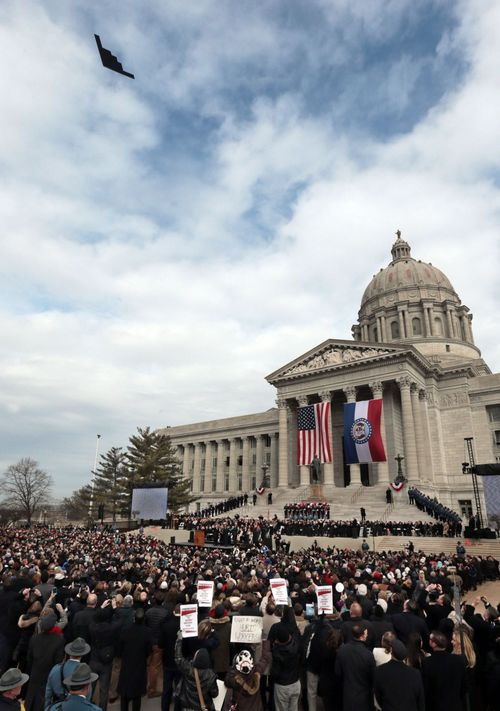
A B-2 stealth bomber flies over the Inauguration of Governor Eric Greitens on January 9, 2017, in Jefferson City, Missouri.

Greitens took office as governor on January 9, 2017. His initial Cabinet was:

| Cabinet Position | Name | Appointment Date |
|---|---|---|
| Administrator of the Office of Administration | Sarah Steelman | January 6, 2017 |
| Director of the Department of Agriculture | Chris Chinn | December 27, 2017 |
| Director of the Department of Corrections | Anne Precythe | December 21, 2016 |
| Director of the Department of Natural Resources | Carol Comer | January 18, 2017 |
| Director of the Department of Public Safety | Charles Juden | January 2, 2017 |
| Director of the Department of Revenue | Joel Walters | February 14, 2017 |
| Director of the Missouri Department of Insurance, Financial Institutions, and Professional Registration | Chlora Lindely-Myers | February 14, 2017 |
| Director of the Department of Health and Senior Services | Randall W. Williams | February 9, 2017 |
| Director of the Department of Economic Development | Rob Dixon | June 2, 2017 |
| Director of the Department of Social Services | Steve Corsi | May 19, 2017 |
| Director of the Department of Labor and Industrial Relations | Anna Hui | March 30, 2017 |

=== Tenure ===
==== Infrastructure ====
Greitens supported public infrastructure investment as a tool for economic development and to reduce unemployment. As governor, he introduced a $25 million "Jobs and Infrastructure Fund" to state-sponsor construction of communications, utilities, transportation and other infrastructure at the request of private companies looking to expand into Missouri. He initially opposed public funding or tax credits for construction of the Centene Stadium in St. Louis on land owned by the Missouri Department of Transportation, but later said he was "willing to work with" investors.

Greitens opposed the 2021 Infrastructure Investment and Jobs Act, calling it "irresponsible socialist legislation". He voiced support for continuing construction of the Keystone Pipeline.

==== Economic, labor, and regulatory issues ====
In February 2017, Greitens signed a bill making Missouri the 28th right-to-work state. In response, unions that opposed the law filed a referendum to overturn it, and on August 7, 2018, Missouri voters voted to overturn it.

The Greitens administration sided with agriculture industry in opposing the Obama administration's proposed "Waters of the United States" (WOTUS) rule.

Greitens supported the Missouri Steel Mill Bill, legislation that allowed utility regulators to approve lower electricity rates for industrial companies using large amounts of energy. The legislation was drafted in response to the March 2016 Noranda smelter closure. During the final weeks of the regular 2017 legislative session, the Missouri House of Representatives passed an amendment by State Representative Don Rone Jr. designed to help bring industrial jobs to the state. The bill met with opposition in the Senate led by Senator Doug Libla and failed. Greitens called a special legislative session in May 2017, bringing the Missouri General Assembly back to the Capitol to pass the legislation one week after its regular session adjourned. After calling the session, he held rallies urging lawmakers to approve the bill. Ultimately, the General Assembly passed the legislation and Greitens signed it into law on June 16, 2017. After the special session, Magnitude 7 Metals LLC announced that the firm would restart two of the plant's three production lines. After the announcement, Greitens accepted an invitation to meet with President Donald Trump at the White House to discuss jobs.

In 2018, Greitens proposed a package of $800 million in state tax cuts. He specifically proposed a 10% reduction in the top individual state income tax rate (reducing it from 5.9% to 5.3%) and a reduction in the state corporate income tax rate by almost one-third, from 6.25% to 4.25%, which would give Missouri the nation's second-lowest corporate rate. Greitens also proposed the creation of a non-refundable state tax credit for low-income workers, and applying the Missouri sales tax to online purchases for the first time.

==== Abortion ====
Greitens identifies himself as "pro-life". After the session on the Steel Mill Bill, he called a second special session to pass anti-abortion legislation. He went on a statewide tour with former Governor of Arkansas Mike Huckabee in support of the legislation. The bill required that doctors explain the risks of abortion to a patient 72 hours before performing an abortion, called for annual inspections of abortion clinics, added new whistle-blower protections for clinic employees, and heightened requirements for pathologists who provide services to abortion facilities. Greitens also specifically targeted a St. Louis law that banned employers and landlords from discriminating against women who have had an abortion. Alison Dreith, the executive director of NARAL Pro Choice Missouri, said the session was "political theater"; Greitens signed the wide-ranging anti-abortion measure into law in June 2017, at a private ceremony with legislators who sponsored the bill and anti-abortion lobbyists. The law was unsuccessfully challenged in the courts. Greitens also opposes embryonic stem cell research. In 2022, he called the overturning of Roe v. Wade a "huge victory."

Greitens was condemned by both Planned Parenthood and NARAL Pro-Choice America. Missouri Right to Life, one of the largest anti-abortion organizations in the state, endorsed Greitens's 2022 U.S. Senate campaign, but did not endorse his 2016 gubernatorial campaign after finding he had accepted a $125,000 donation from embryonic stem cell researcher Julian Robertson.

Greitens was featured in the 2018 Netflix documentary film Reversing Roe.

==== Healthcare ====
Greitens staunchly opposed proposals to accept the Medicaid expansion in Missouri under the Affordable Care Act (ACA). The proposals would have expanded health insurance coverage eligibility to about 300,000 Missourians. Greitens also called for the ACA to be repealed and replaced.

Greitens called the opioid epidemic a "modern plague". In 2018, he issued an executive order to create a prescription drug monitoring program, directing the Department of Health and Senior Services to build a database to help identify suspicious patterns of prescriptions of controlled substances, including opioids. Greitens was widely praised for calling attention to the epidemic, but received some criticism from state legislators who considered the order an abuse of executive power. Three months after the order was issued, no prescription monitoring program was functionally operating, leaving Missouri de facto the only state without one. The program was later recodified by the Missouri Senate and signed into law by Governor Mike Parson in 2021.

Greitens administration officials sent notices to 8,000 doctors who were not following best practices for prescribing opioids within the state's Medicaid program, instructing them to change their prescribing patterns and consider referring people on long-term opioids to addiction programs. The Kansas City Star reported that Greitens also started filling vacancies on the medical licensing board with physicians who were "willing to get tough on colleagues who contribute to the opioid crisis."

Greitens voiced his support for use of medical cannabis in some circumstances.

==== Crime and policing ====
In 2017, Greitens named Drew Juden director of the Missouri Department of Public Safety (which oversees the Missouri State Highway Patrol, Missouri National Guard, Missouri Gaming Commission, and other bodies). Greitens's successor, Mike Parson, ousted Juden in August 2018. In November 2018, Parson and his DPS Director, Sandy Karsten, asked State Auditor Nicole Galloway to conduct an audit into the department covering Juden's time as director; the request noted that an internal review had "raised concerns about questionable use of taxpayer dollars." The audit report, released in 2019, determined that the office under Juden had "abused" the state contracting process by using a legislative grant for local equipment to steer funds to the Missouri Police Chiefs Charitable Foundation, a group with which Juden was affiliated, and that the financial maneuver cost the state "approximately $16,000 in interest." The auditor's office also criticized Juden's use of annual leave (finding that Juden did not claim annual leave when he when on vacation, and was thus overpaid by some amount for "unused" leave) and a state vehicle (finding that his usage was 44% higher than previous or subsequent DPS directors'). Juden denied any wrongdoing, framing the findings as a political attack, and Greitens defended Juden's conduct.

Greitens signed a "Blue Alert" law modeled after the Amber alert system for missing children. He pursued the idea to allow public broadcasts of information that could assist in the apprehension of individuals who commit violence against police officers. The measure was part of a package of crime-related changes to state law the Missouri House and Senate approved in May 2017. It also enhanced penalties for assaults on law enforcement officers and created the state crime of illegal reentry for persons deported from the United States for committing a crime who return and commit a felony.

In 2017, Greitens granted a stay of execution to Marcellus Williams, who had been set to be executed that day. DNA tests, using technology unavailable at the time of the killing, on the knife used in the killing matched an unknown male, not Williams. Greitens appointed a board of five retired judges to investigate the case and make a recommendation.

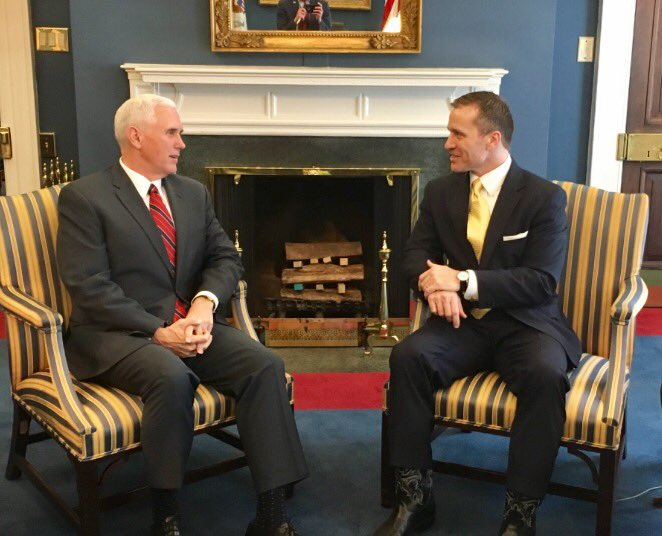
Greitens meeting with Vice President Mike Pence, January 2017

In 2017, St. Louis police officer Jason Stockley was acquitted of first-degree murder for shooting Anthony Lamar Smith in 2011. Protests erupted in St. Louis. Before the verdict, Greitens—who was openly critical of his predecessor Jay Nixon's response to the Ferguson unrest—preemptively activated the Missouri National Guard and scheduled 12-hour shifts for the St. Louis municipal police, in anticipation of civil unrest. He said he would preserve the right to peacefully protest but would oversee the prosecution of persons engaging in looting, violence, or other criminal activity.

In December 2017, Greitens commuted the life prison sentence of Judy Henderson, who had been jailed for 35 years after being convicted of the July 1981 robbery-murder of jeweler Harry Klein. Greitens went to Chillicothe Correctional Center to meet with Henderson, then 68, and sign the commutation papers. Authorities believe her boyfriend, Greg Cruzen, shot Klein and paid four witnesses to lie about Henderson's role; the same defense attorney represented Henderson and Cruzen at trial. On his last day in office, Greitens granted Henderson a pardon.

==== Low-income housing tax credits ====
In 2017 the Missouri Housing Development Commission voted 8 to 2 to zero out the state's low-income housing tax credit for 2018. Greitens phoned into the meeting and voted to zero out the tax credits while Lieutenant Governor Mike Parson voted to keep them. Greitens wrote, "special interests abused low income housing tax breaks to make themselves rich."

After Greitens's appointments to the commission and the 2017 vote, Missouri did not issue $140 million in state low-income housing tax credits. The low-income housing tax credit program was cut from over $1.3 billion over the previous decade to zero. Greitens accused the low-income housing industry of conspiring to upend his political career though legal troubles and the threat of impeachment.

==== Missouri National Guard ====
In 2017, Trump appointed Greitens to the Council of Governors, an advisory group of governors dealing with issues such as national defense, the national guard and defense support to local authorities.

In 2017, Greitens announced the Missouri Army National Guard would add nearly 800 soldiers by 2019.

In February 2018, Greitens announced that members of the Missouri National Guard would train with the Israeli Home Front Command. Missouri is one of four states—along with Colorado, Illinois and Massachusetts—to train with the command, a branch of the Israel Defense Forces that focuses on civilian protection during a war or crisis.

In April 2018, Greitens signed into law legislation allowing those in the Missouri National Guard and the armed forces reserves to deduct their military income from their state taxes.

==== Other aspects ====
Greitens's first two executive orders banned employees in the executive branch from accepting gifts from lobbyists and froze all new regulations through February 2017. In November 2018, a statewide referendum put heavy restrictions on lobbyist gifts, virtually banning them.

In February 2017, 170 gravestones at the Chesed Shel Emeth Jewish Cemetery in University City, Missouri, were toppled and overturned. Greitens and Vice President Mike Pence participated in the cleanup effort.

Greitens appointed Jackson County Circuit Judge W. Brent Powell to the Missouri Supreme Court in April 2017.

As governor, Greitens signed tort reform measures.

In June 2017, Greitens signed Missouri's first Foster Care Bill of Rights, which outlined specific measures designed to improve the safety and quality of life of children in Missouri's foster care system. As first lady, Sheena Greitens focused on efforts to improve the lives of foster children and foster parents. The Greitens administration waived the $15 fee for foster children to obtain copies of their birth certificates; made appointments to child protection boards, many of which had previously been unable to function due to lack of a quorum; and joined the National Electronic Interstate Compact Enterprise, an interstate compact to facilitate adoption and fostering across state lines.

As he took office, Greitens signed an executive order banning state employees in his administration from accepting or soliciting gifts from lobbyists. The order also banned employees in the governor's office from lobbying the executive branch while Greitens was in office. The order was later loosened by Governor Mike Parson, who allowed gifts to members of the executive branch. As lieutenant governor, Parson received meals and gifts from lobbyists worth $2,752 in his first six months in office, the St. Louis Post-Dispatch reported.

In 2017, Greitens criticized fellow Republicans Denny Hoskins and Paul Wieland on social media. Hoskins and Wieland were the two Republican senators who voted to allow raises in legislative pay to take effect. (Six other senators cast no vote on the matter.) Greitens had personally pressured lawmakers to vote down the raise. Hoskins and Wieland described their meetings with Greitens as tense, with Wieland in particular characterizing the meetings as intimidation and saying that he felt insulted.

Greitens approved a plan to cut more than two dozen state boards and commissions, in line with a 2017 Boards and Commissions Task Force report that outlined ways to eliminate 439 gubernatorial appointments and to eliminate or merge numerous state boards and commissions. He ordered the sale of 30 cars from the state's Office of Administration General Services fleet and the sale of one of two state-owned passenger planes. Greitens released $4 million in biodiesel facility subsidies, which was originally withheld because of concerns about a prospective state budget shortfall.

Greitens ended a longstanding state policy against using tax dollars to aid religious groups. His decision came a week before the U.S. Supreme Court heard arguments in the case of Trinity Lutheran Church of Columbia v. Comer. The lawsuit challenged a 2012 decision by the Missouri Department of Natural Resources to deny the Columbia church a grant to replace the gravel on its playground with softer, safer material. Greitens instructed the Department of Natural Resources to allow religious organizations to apply for and be eligible to receive those grants.

In the final days of his administration, Greitens signed 77 pieces of legislation into law. Among these was a bill that cut the corporate tax rate and changed how utility companies receive rate adjustments. He also signed a law making revenge porn illegal in Missouri. He banned lab-grown meat products or meat substitutes from being labeled as "meat", provided a 5% rate reduction for utility companies, and allowed monopoly utility companies to increase fees for water services if they don't make the expected amount from utility rates. Greitens also signed bills to:

- allow telephone companies to choose a different way to be taxed;
- pare a program intended to entice developers to restore dilapidated buildings;
- raise the minimum age to be tried as an adult from 17 to 18;
- give state regulatory control over disposal of industrial waste;
- reclassify state workers as at-will employees;
- allow businesses to grow and harvest hemp;
- decrease the corporate tax rate from 6.25% to 4%.

Greitens also issued four commutations and five pardons on his final day in office.

=== Resignation ===
Eric Greitens resigned as governor of Missouri on June 1, 2018, during a period of multiple ongoing investigations. Earlier that year, he had been charged with felony invasion of privacy related to an extramarital relationship, and later with felony computer tampering involving the alleged use of a donor list from The Mission Continues for political fundraising. A bipartisan committee of the Missouri House of Representatives also conducted an inquiry and released a report on the allegations. In May 2018, prosecutors dropped all criminal charges, citing evidentiary issues and other concerns.

Shortly afterward, the Missouri General Assembly convened a special session to consider whether to initiate impeachment proceedings. Greitens announced his resignation before the session concluded, stating that stepping down was in the best interest of the state. His resignation ended his term approximately seventeen months after taking office.

== 2022 U.S. Senate campaign ==
In 2020, Greitens announced his candidacy for the Republican nomination in the 2022 United States Senate election in Missouri to succeed the retiring Roy Blunt. Greitens was endorsed by former New York City mayor Rudy Giuliani, former U.S. Secretary of the Interior Ryan Zinke, and Fox News personality Kimberly Guilfoyle, the latter joining his campaign as a national chair.

Many Republican officials, strategists, and donors maneuvered to stymie Greitens's attempted comeback, believing that the scandal surrounding his resignation as governor, his extramarital affair, and the sexual assault accusation against him would make him a weak general election candidate and lead to the loss of the Senate seat to a Democrat. Notable Republican opponents of Greitens's candidacy included Karl Rove, Johnny DeStefano, and Senator Rick Scott, the chairman of the National Republican Senatorial Committee. After Greitens's wife filed an affidavit against him in March 2022 accusing him of physical abuse, Senator Josh Hawley (who endorsed another candidate, Vicky Hartzler, the previous month) called upon Greitens to drop out.

Republican megadonor Richard Uihlein funded a pro-Greitens super PAC ("Team PAC"), contributing $2.5 million to it. Other Republican megadonors, including Rex Sinquefield and August Busch, aligned against Greitens. A Republican-funded anti-Greitens super PAC ("Show Me Values PAC") was created in June 2022 and ran $6.2 million in ads through late July 2022.

Like other Republican Senate candidates in 2022, Greitens promoted the "Great Replacement" conspiracy theory, a far-right notion that gained currency within the Republican Party; he also accused Joe Biden of adopting policies that "are an assault on the entire idea of America." In June 2022, Greitens released a campaign advertisement showing him bursting into a house, wielding a shotgun, and flanked by men dressed in full military gear carrying assault rifles. In the ad, Greitens declared: "Join the MAGA crew. Get a RINO hunting permit. There's no bagging limit, no tagging limit, and it doesn't expire until we save our country." ("RINO" stands for "Republican in name only"). The ad was widely criticized, removed from Facebook, and given a warning label on Twitter. Some Republicans, such as Missouri Senate Majority Leader Caleb Rowden and U.S. Representatives Barbara Comstock and Adam Kinzinger, condemned the ad. Greitens's campaign denied that the ad condones violence.

As a candidate, Greitens sought the endorsement of Donald Trump. Trump initially made no endorsement, instead praising Billy Long. Republican officials, including Scott, waged a campaign to persuade Trump not to endorse Greitens. On the eve of the primary election, Trump issued a statement endorsing "ERIC" in the primary, leaving it unclear whether he was endorsing Eric Greitens and Eric Schmitt, both of whom laid claim to the endorsement. In the primary election, Greitens was defeated, coming in third place; Schmitt won with 45.7% of the vote; Hartzler received 22.1%, Greitens 18.9%, and Long 5%. Greitens carried a few Bootheel counties but no other region.

== Controversies ==
Across his career, Greitens has faced several legal and ethical allegations; however, most of the related criminal charges were later dismissed, withdrawn, or did not result in convictions.

=== Compensation ===
As CEO of The Mission Continues, Greitens received $700,000 in compensation from the nonprofit. He worked without pay in 2007 and 2008; was paid $150,000 from mid-2010 through 2011 after receiving a grant from the Draper Richards Kaplan Foundation; and was paid $200,000 in each of the years 2011, 2012, and 2013. He stepped down as CEO in 2014 and left the board of the organization in 2015. Greitens's compensation as head of the nonprofit became an issue in his subsequent political campaigns. Experts on nonprofit compensation said that his salary as head of the nonprofit was higher than similarly situated activities, although not extravagant in light of the organization's mission, as well as Greitens's education and career background.

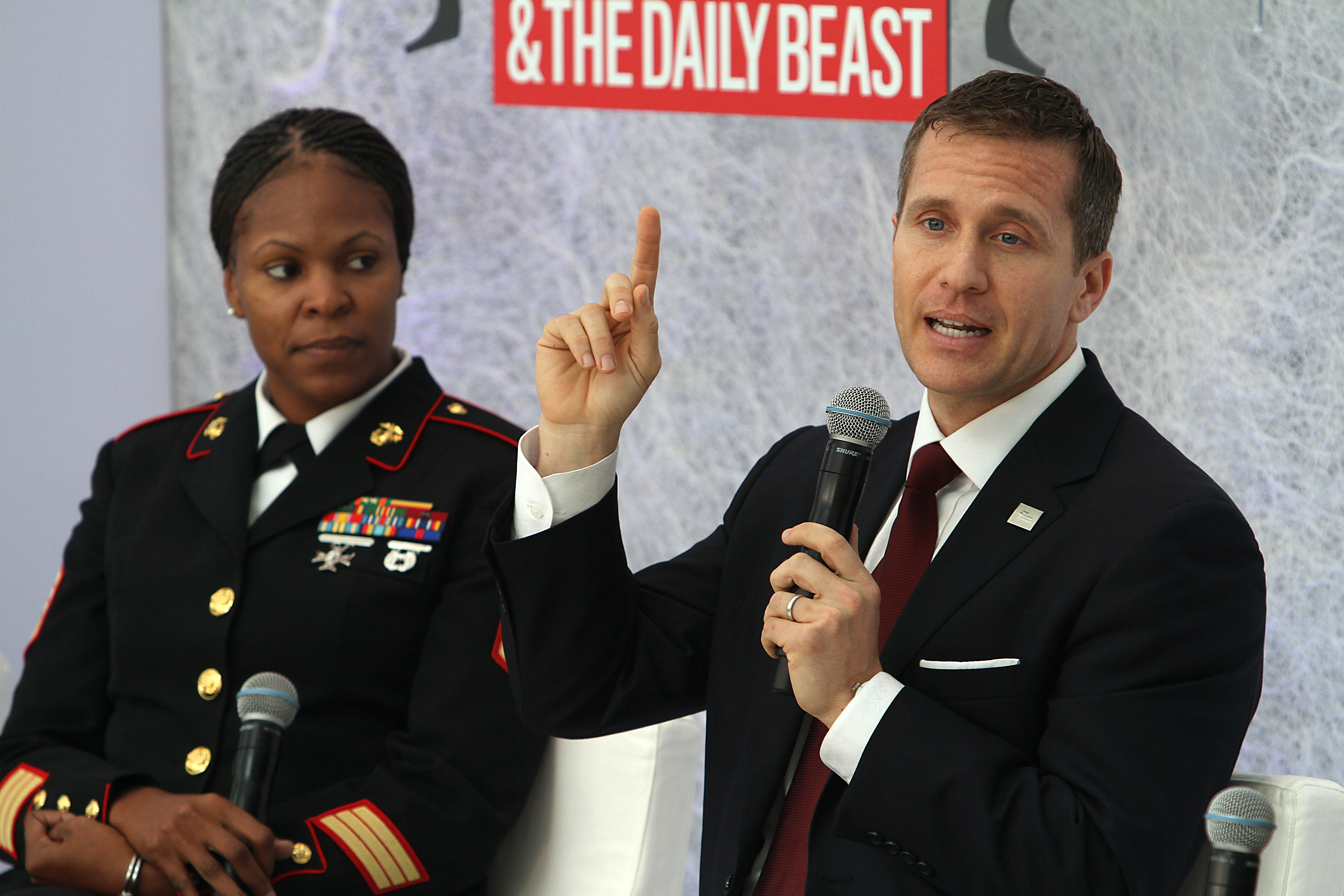
Greitens and a U.S. Marine with The Mission Continues in 2012

The Associated Press reported in March 2018 that Greitens had used the charity's email account to arrange political meetings about his gubernatorial campaign, which is prohibited by federal tax law. He was also accused of using the charity's list of donors to raise money for his campaign, a violation of campaign finance law. On December 28, 2018, The Kansas City Star reported that the Missouri attorney general, Josh Hawley, had dropped the investigation against the nonprofit.

=== Affair and invasion of privacy charge ===
On January 10, 2018, ahead of an investigative report released by St. Louis CBS affiliate KMOV the same evening, Greitens publicly disclosed that he had engaged in an extramarital affair with his hairstylist, identified only as "K. S.", in 2015. He and his wife issued a joint statement in which he acknowledged the affair, called it "a deeply personal mistake", and said that "we dealt with this together honestly and privately."

KMOV played a recording made by K. S.'s then-husband in which she said that Greitens had invited her to his home. While there, K. S. consented to having her hands taped to exercise rings above her head while she was undressed. Greitens then blindfolded her. In the recording, K. S. added that while she was blindfolded, Greitens took nude pictures of her without her consent and threatened to share them if she ever went public with their affair. K. S. alleged that Greitens told her: "You're not going to mention my name. Don't even mention my name to anybody at all, because if you do, I'm going to take these pictures, and I'm going to put them everywhere I can. They are going to be everywhere, and then everyone will know what a little whore you are." K. S. tried to leave, but reported to a Special Investigative Committee on Oversight of the Missouri House of Representatives that Greitens pulled her into a "bear hug" "so that she was now lying on the basement floor, crying." K. S. further testified that Greitens then coerced her into performing oral sex on him, after which he permitted her to leave. K. S. also testified to the committee that in a later encounter, Greitens slapped her; she added that in their final encounter, Greitens "smacked [her] and grabbed [her] and shoved [her] down on the ground."

Greitens denied the blackmail accusation. After initially not commenting on the question, his attorney appeared to deny that any pictures were taken; in an email, he wrote, "No violence. No picture taken. No threat of blackmail." Greitens also denied taking the alleged photos.

After Attorney General Josh Hawley's office said in a statement that it did not have jurisdiction to look into the matter, the circuit attorney for the City of St. Louis opened an investigation into the blackmail allegations.

==== Indictment ====
On February 22, 2018, a St. Louis grand jury indicted Greitens on felony invasion of privacy charges. He was released on his own recognizance and waived his first appearance. The judge denied a defense motion to have a bench trial rather than a jury trial and a defense motion to dismiss the indictment.

In pre-trial depositions, William Tisaby, a former FBI agent who assisted St. Louis Circuit Attorney Kim Gardner with the Greitens investigations, affirmed to defense attorneys that he had taken notes during his interview of K. S. After attorneys pressed him to turn over the notes, he changed his testimony and asserted that he had not taken notes during the interview. Video footage, initially withheld from defense attorneys but later tendered, showed Tisaby taking notes during his interview with K. S. while in Gardner's presence.

==== Dismissal of criminal charges ====
Prosecutors withdrew the felony invasion of privacy charge on May 14, 2018, after investigators failed to find the alleged photo that formed the basis of the charge.

The circuit attorney referred the case to a special prosecutor, Jean Peters Baker of Kansas City. Baker declined to refile charges, citing the statutes of limitations and insufficient evidence. The Kansas City Star confirmed that at the conclusion of Gardner's and Baker's investigations, evidence of an alleged photo was never produced.

==== Special Investigative Committee report ====
Several Republican members of the Missouri House of Representatives called on Greitens to resign after K. S.'s allegations were made public. Missouri Attorney General Hawley called the situation "very grave". Illinois governor Bruce Rauner, a Greitens campaign contributor and ally, called on him to resign.

On April 11, 2018, a Special Investigative Committee (SIC) of the Missouri House of Representatives released an initial 24-page report detailing the allegations from K. S. The report concluded that K. S. was credible. It detailed the alleged precautions Greitens took to hide the affair, including making K. S. change clothes and leave all of her belongings in his kitchen. The report also noted Greitens's alleged use of a nude photo to blackmail K. S. and Greitens's alleged physical and verbal abuse. In a four-page report issued on April 30, 2018, the SIC chair, Republican Representative Jay Barnes, stated that Greitens's claims that K. S.'s testimony was inconsistent were groundless.

==== Impeachment session and resignation ====
On May 3, the Missouri House and Senate collected enough signatures from members to call a special session to consider impeachment. House Speaker Todd Richardson, a Republican, said 29 senators and 138 House members, more than the three-fourths required in each chamber, supported convening a 30-day special session. It began on May 18, the last day of the regular session.

On May 29, 2018, Greitens announced that he would resign effective June 1, 2018. The St. Louis prosecutor's office had made a deal with him that if he resigned, it would withdraw the felony charges for using the veterans' charity email list in his campaign.

At 508 days, Greitens's gubernatorial tenure is the 10th-shortest in Missouri history. Among elected governors, his tenure is the shortest of any Missouri governor since 1861, and the fourth-shortest overall (behind only Frederick Bates, Claiborne Fox Jackson, and Trusten Polk).

Upon Greitens's resignation, Lieutenant Governor Mike Parson succeeded him as governor. He made some changes to the cabinet, announcing director changes for five agencies.

==== Investigation of St. Louis Circuit Attorney ====
After the dismissal of all charges against Greitens, his defense attorneys filed a police report with the St. Louis Metropolitan Police Department alleging criminal misconduct by William Tisaby, a former FBI agent hired by Gardner's office to investigate Greitens. In June 2018, St. Louis Circuit Judge Michael Mullen appointed Gerard Carmody as special prosecutor to investigate alleged misconduct by Tisaby. In June 2019, Tisaby was indicted on six counts of felony perjury and one count of felony tampering with evidence; prosecutors alleged that he concealed documents from defense attorneys and lied under oath during the deposition about materials that could materially affect the outcome of the Greitens case. In 2022, Greitens's ex-wife said in a sworn affidavit that he had admitted to taking the pictures. In March 2022, Tisaby pleaded guilty to misdemeanor evidence tampering and was sentenced to one year's unsupervised probation. He admitted to failing to give Greitens's lawyers documents, including his notes from an interview with the women involved in the case. Tisaby reportedly pleaded guilty due to his health and his attorney's uncertainty about whether he could endure a full jury trial.

In July 2019, the grand jury that indicted Tisaby disbanded without any other indictments. Carmody indicated that the investigation continued into Gardner's actions.

Gardner was never charged with any crime in connection with the Greitens investigation. But during an April 2022 proceeding before the Missouri Office of Disciplinary Counsel (which regulates the conduct of lawyers in Missouri), she admitted to misconduct, attributing it to inadvertent errors as part of a fast-moving investigation. A disciplinary hearing panel recommended that she receive a reprimand, and she agreed to the recommendation.

==== Aftermath ====
On December 31, 2018, the Special Investigative Committee on Oversight that was investigating Greitens released its final report. The St. Louis Post-Dispatch reported, "Documents and testimony showed that Greitens ran an off-the-books gubernatorial campaign in 2014 and 2015, and lied about his campaign's acceptance of a charity donor list from the Mission Continues, a veterans charity Greitens founded in 2007."

Greitens and his supporters have denied any criminal wrongdoing and have repeatedly called the allegations a "political witch hunt".

Before his resignation, many Republican figures mentioned Greitens as a leading contender for President of the United States. On June 2, 2019, the St. Louis Post-Dispatch reported that Greitens had returned to the U.S. Navy as a Naval Reserve Officer.

=== Use of Confide app ===
In December 2017, Democrats accused Greitens and senior members of his staff of subverting Missouri's open records laws after the Kansas City Star reported that they used Confide, a messaging app that erases texts after they have been read, on their personal phones. Attorney General Hawley's office said it would investigate potential violations of the state Sunshine Law. In March 2018, Hawley cleared Greitens, finding no evidence of wrongdoing. Democrats criticized Hawley for failing to seek to interview Greitens or attempt to retrieve messages sent on the app.

In late December 2018, two attorneys sued, claiming that use of such "self-immolating" apps by elected officials and government employees violates Missouri's public records laws. Representative Gina Mitten filed House Bill 1817 in the 2018 legislative session; the bill would ban use of apps like Confide in conducting public business. In 2019, Cole County Circuit Judge Jon Beetem sided with Greitens, dismissing the claims that Greitens's office had subverted or violated any laws. Beetem also ruled that as a private citizen, St. Louis attorney Ben Sansone lacked standing to sue Greitens over alleged Sunshine Law violations.

=== Use of nonprofit's email list for political campaign ===
In October 2016, the Associated Press first reported that Greitens's campaign had obtained a list of donors to The Mission Continues, the 501(c)(3) nonprofit that Greitens had founded, and that the political campaign had raised almost $2 million from donors who previously contributed money to the nonprofit. Missouri Attorney General Josh Hawley said in April 2018 that an investigation by his office found evidence that Greitens's use of the donor list broke the campaign finance law, but that the decision whether to file charges against Greitens lay with Gardner. Two days later, the St. Louis Circuit Attorney's Office indicted Greitens on a felony charge for tampering with a computer in taking email and donor lists from The Mission Continues for fundraising purposes. Greitens initially denied using the list, but in April 2017 he acknowledged its use. He said the list was provided by his then-campaign manager, but the former manager denied that. In May 2018, one day after Greitens announced his resignation as governor, the St. Louis Circuit Attorney's Office announced a deal to dismiss the computer-tampering charge against Greitens; Gardner said: "I remain confident we have the evidence required to pursue charges against Mr. Greitens, but sometimes pursuing charges is not the right thing to do for our city or our state." In May 2018, Cole County Prosecutor Mark Richardson announced he would not file any additional charges against Greitens, as suggested by Hawley, related to how his gubernatorial campaign reported the receipt of a charity donor list used for political fundraising.

=== Campaign finance violations ===
In 2020, the Missouri Ethics Commission found probable cause that Greitens's campaign had violated campaign finance law by coordinating with, and failing to report legal in-kind contributions from, outside "dark money" groups during his 2016 gubernatorial campaign. The two outside groups were LG PAC and A New Missouri; the former ran campaign ads that praised Greitens and attacking his opponents, while the latter paid for an opinion poll. The Commission ordered Greitens's campaign to pay a penalty of approximately $178,000, but the campaign had to pay only $38,000 within 45 days, with the remaining amount suspended unless Greitens broke any campaign finance laws in the next two years. The Commission stated that there was no evidence that Greitens "individually" knew of the reporting violations, but noted that "candidates are ultimately responsible for all reporting requirements." The commission stated that it did not investigate allegations that Greitens had operated an illicit "off-the-books campaign" in 2014 and 2015 because the two-year statute of limitations on that alleged offense had lapsed. Greitens's campaign agreed to the penalty settlement and denied doing anything wrong.

=== Allegations of domestic abuse ===
On April 11, 2020, Eric and Sheena Greitens announced they were ending their marriage. In court filings for their 2022 child custody case, Sheena Greitens accused him, in a sworn affidavit, of physical abuse "such as cuffing our then-3-year-old son across the face at the dinner table" and said that, because of the abuse, "steps were taken to limit his access to firearms." She said she has "photographic evidence" of the abuse injuries. Greitens's attorney said the alleged injuries came from their son just "roughhousing with his brother."

Greitens denied allegations of abuse, saying they are politically motivated and that leading Republicans helped his ex-wife write the affidavit. In August 2022, a Missouri judge found "no pattern of domestic violence" by Greitens and ruled in favor of moving the case to Texas.

== Personal life ==
=== Marriages and divorces ===
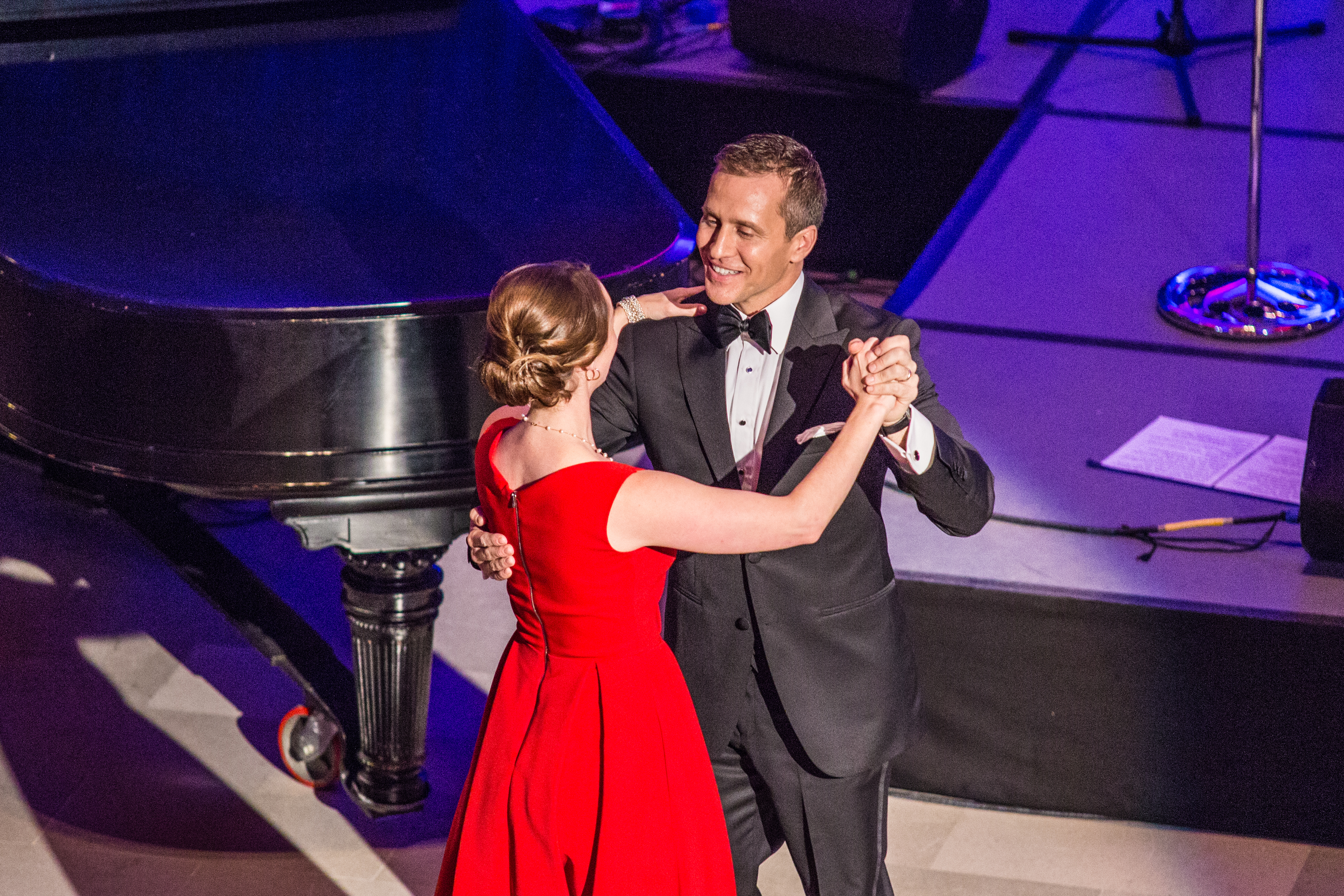
Eric and Sheena Greitens dancing at the inaugural ball

Greitens's marriage to his first wife, Rebecca Wright, ended in divorce in 2003.

Greitens was married to Sheena Elise Chestnut from 2011 to 2020. They have two sons.

=== Religious views ===
Greitens is Jewish and attends the Reform B'nai El synagogue.

=== Hobbies and interests ===
As a candidate and as governor, Greitens often publicly touted his fitness and publicized physical feats. He was a boxer in college with a black belt in taekwondo.

=== Charity and volunteering ===
In his early 20s, Greteins worked as a humanitarian volunteer and documentary photographer in Rwanda, Cambodia, Zaire, and Bolivia, as well as a Bosnian refugee camp in Croatia. His photography work was later published in his book Strength and Compassion and showcased at the International Photography Hall of Fame.

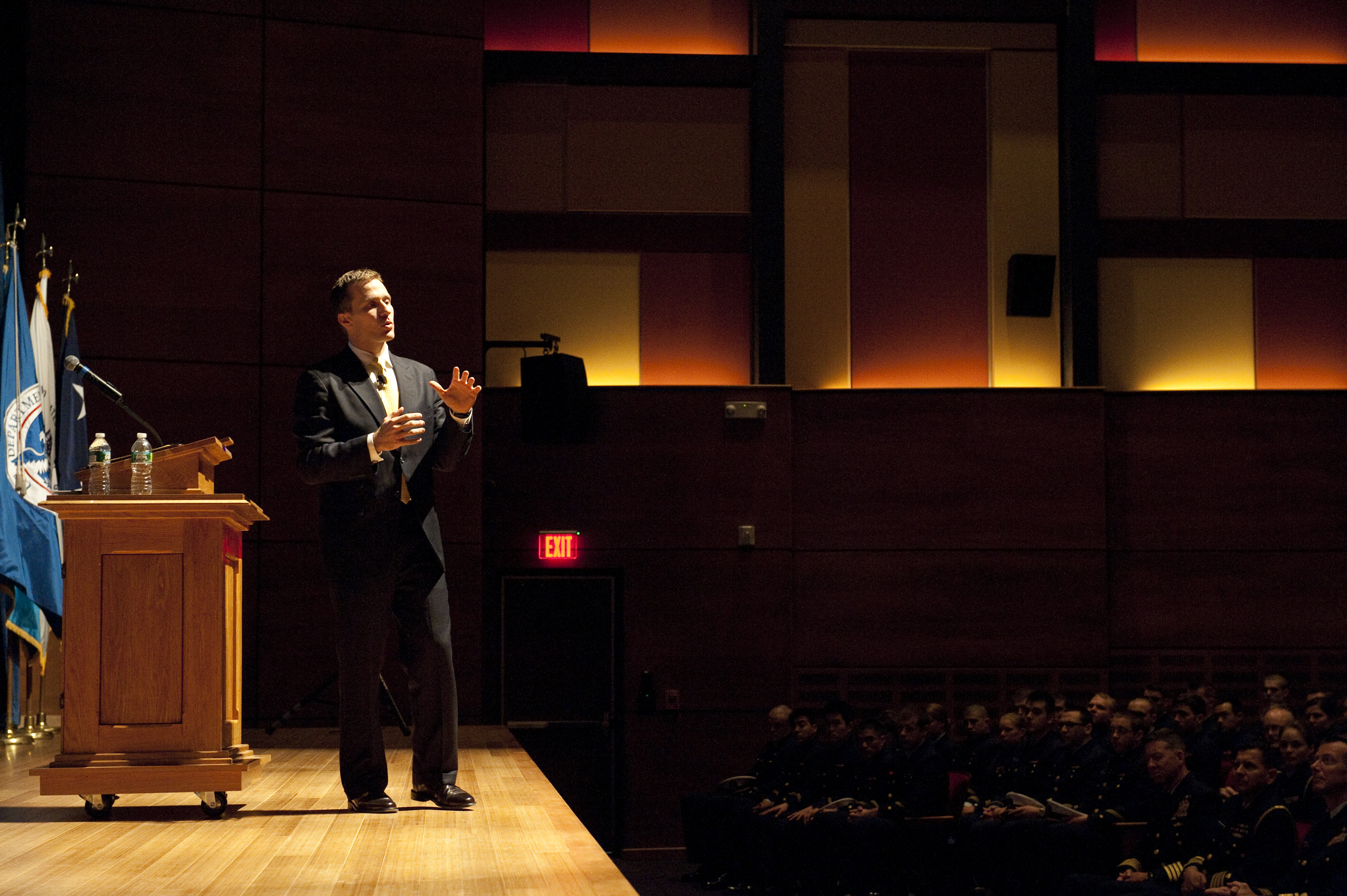
Greitens speaking in 2011

After returning from Iraq, Greitens founded The Mission Continues, a nonprofit organization that places veterans with volunteer organizations to encourage public service, build community connections, and improve career skills.

== Honors and awards ==
- In 2008, President George W. Bush awarded Greitens the President's Volunteer Service Award for his work at The Mission Continues.
- For his humanitarian work he was awarded the Gleitsman Citizen Activist Award, which included a $120,000 prize, by Harvard Kennedy School in 2014.
- Greitens was also named the 2010 Reader of the Year by Outside magazine.
- His memoir, Strength and Compassion won Grand Prize Winner for the New York Book Festival.
- In 2012, Greitens was awarded an honorary Doctor of Humane Letters (DHL) from Tufts University. That same year he received the Bronfman Prize.
- Time named Greitens to its 2013 list of the 100 Most Influential People in the World. In 2014 Fortune featured him as one of the World's 50 Greatest Leaders.

== In popular culture ==
In 2013, Greitens made a cameo appearance, along with other post–9/11 military veterans, in the science fiction film Star Trek Into Darkness. He is featured in Joe Klein's book Charlie Mike: A True Story of Heroes Who Brought Their Mission Home.

== Works ==
Greitens drew from his military experience for his career as a speaker at corporate events. In addition, he wrote three books:

- Strength & Compassion: Photographs and Essays (2008): a collection of photographs and essays with a foreword by Rwandan humanitarian Paul Rusesabagina and an introduction by Bobby Muller, cofounder of the International Campaign to Ban Landmines. Photographs by Greitens were displayed at an exhibition at the International Photography Hall of Fame and Museum in Saint Louis in December 2014. Strength and Compassion won the grand prize at the 2009 New York Book Festival.
- The Heart and the Fist: The Education of a Humanitarian, the Making of a Navy SEAL (Houghton Mifflin Harcourt, 2011): a memoir focusing on Greitens's humanitarian work and military experiences. The book ranked 10th on The New York Times bestseller list for hardcover nonfiction in May 2011. The next year, Houghton Mifflin Harcourt also released a young adult edition, The Warrior's Heart.
- Resilience: Hard-Won Wisdom for Living a Better Life (Houghton Mifflin Harcourt, 2015): The book is structured as a series of 23 letters Greitens wrote to a fellow Navy SEAL struggling with PTSD.

In a June 2018 letter, Representative Jay Barnes, the Republican chair of the special state House committee that investigated allegations of misconduct against Greitens, said that the committee had evidence suggesting that Greitens "may have engaged in criminal fraud" related to a grant he received to write and promote the book. Barnes also said, "Though not criminal, other documents in the Committee's possession raise suspicions of literary fraud regarding Resilience." According to the St. Louis Post-Dispatch, an early manuscript of the book was arranged as a collection of "thoughts", rather than a compilation of letters to a veteran. Danny Laub, a former political aide to Greitens, testified that in 2015, he was paid from grant funds from the John Templeton Foundation, administered by Washington University in St. Louis, to promote the work while simultaneously setting up Greitens's gubernatorial campaign. A university investigation concluded, "Based on the materials available to us and within the scope of our review, we found nothing improper about the administration or use of the grant funds." But Barnes said that his committee had access to additional evidence the university lacked, and released a memorandum in 2018 "asserting that Greitens had misrepresented how much he worked on the book, used grant funds for political purposes and failed to fully disclose his income sources on conflict-of-interest forms filed with the university."

Greitens was a popular speaker before he began his political career. His second and third books displayed the SEALs insignia on their covers, and he charged as much as $75,000 for a speech in Asia. In 2016 an anonymous group charged in a YouTube video that he had exaggerated his record in books and television appearances and was unduly benefiting from his time in the SEALs. Greitens responded by releasing his military records and publishing a video he uploaded to his channel with testimonials from SEALs and Marines with whom he had served.

== Bibliography ==
- Greitens, Eric R. (1996). On Courage (BA). Duke University.
- Greitens, Eric R. (1998). Intervening on Behalf of Children in War: Challenges for Humanitarian Assistance (M.Phil). University of Oxford.
- Greitens, Eric R. (2000). Children First: Ideas and the Dynamics of Aid in Western Voluntary Assistance Programs for War-Affected Children Abroad (D.Phil). University of Oxford.
- Greitens, Eric (2008). Strength & Compassion: Photographs and Essays. Leading Authorities Press. ISBN 978-0971007802.
- Greitens, Eric (2011). The Heart and the Fist: The Education of a Humanitarian, the Making of a Navy SEAL. New York: Houghton Mifflin Harcourt. ISBN 978-0547424859.
- Greitens, Eric (2012). The Warrior's Heart: Becoming a Man of Compassion and Courage. HMH Books for Young Readers. ISBN 978-0547868523.
- Greitens, Eric (2015). Resilience: Hard-Won Wisdom for Living a Better Life. Houghton Mifflin Harcourt. ISBN 978-0544323988.

== See also ==
- List of United States Navy SEALs

Party political offices
| Preceded by Dave Spence | Republican nominee for Governor of Missouri; 2016 | Succeeded by Mike Parson |
Political offices
| Preceded by Jay Nixon | Governor of Missouri; 2017–2018 | Succeeded by Mike Parson |
U.S. order of precedence (ceremonial)
| Preceded by Jay Nixon as Former Governor | Order of precedence of the United States | Succeeded by Mike Parson as Former Governor |
